= The Grandstand =

Outcrop in Death Valley National Park, USA

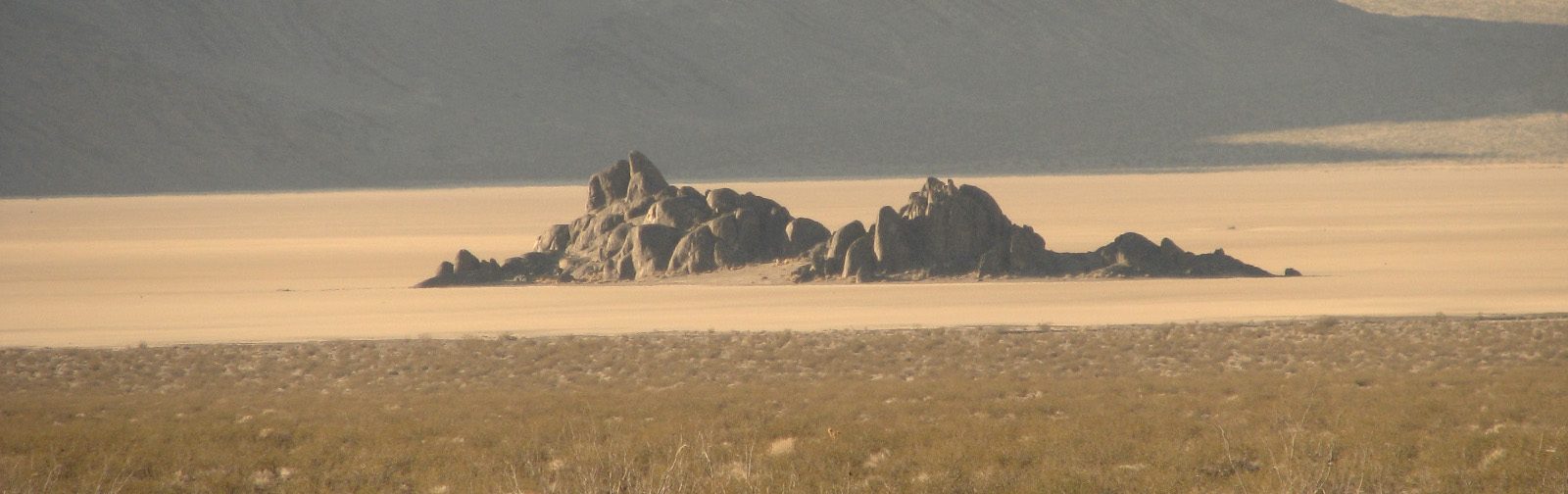
- The Grandstand as seen from the western entry road to the Racetrack Playa - below Teakettle Junction

Highest point
- Elevation: 73 ft (22 m)
- Coordinates: 36.6931°N 117.5668°W

Geography
- Location: Racetrack Valley, Death Valley National Park, Inyo County, California, United States
- Parent range: Cottonwood Mountains

The Grandstand is a natural rock monolith located near the northerly end of Racetrack Playa, north of Death Valley in the Cottonwood Mountains of Death Valley National Park, in Inyo County, California.

== Description ==
The Grandstand consists of two distinct mounds of very dark gray rock with a shallow saddle between them, surrounded on all sides by the nearly featureless, light tan-colored clay sediment of Racetrack Playa. The contrast of the dark rock against the light playa makes The Grandstand appear nearly black in bright sunlight. Due to this contrast, The Grandstand is easily discernible, and unmistakable, from great distances. It can be easily seen from aircraft flying within 100 miles (160 km), even at a 40,000-foot (12 km) altitude.

== Geography ==
The Grandstand is located in the northwest corner of Racetrack Playa and is the only feature, other than small scattered rocks and a dolomite outcrop on the northernmost shore, that interrupt the playa. The southernmost of the two rock mounds that compose The Grandstand is the tallest, by a few feet. It rises approximately 20-metre (66 ft) above the very flat surface of the playa, whose north end is only 1.5-inch (3.8 cm) higher than the southern end. Racetrack Playa is at an elevation of 3,714 feet (1,132 m) above sea level, and is 2.8-mile (4.5 km) long (north-south), and 1.3-mile (2.1 km) wide (east-west).

== Geology ==
The Grandstand is composed of Quartz-Monzonite, also called Adamellite. It is an intrusive igneous rock that cooled slowly deep underground. Quartz monzonite consists of quartz and the two types of feldspar, but has less quartz than the 20% in granite. Such composites having less than 20% quartz composition are referred to as granitoids. It was exposed on the surface during the Pleistocene epoch, as were Ubehebe Peak and the Panamint Range Mountains to the west, and the Cottonwood Mountains to the east, but solidified in the latter part of the Mesozoic Era.

On the south side of The Grandstand, obvious signs of wave-cut erosion are visible, creating a noticeable overhang of 30 feet above the Racetrack Playa's elevation. The formation indicates the Racetrack Playa region experienced much more precipitation in past geologic eras.

While The Grandstand may seem imposing to someone standing nearby, as it rises abruptly out of the flat surface of playa, this outcropping is dwarfed by the height of the surrounding mountains. It is the light colored clay sediment forming the playa surface surrounding the dark grey Grandstand that creates its prominence.

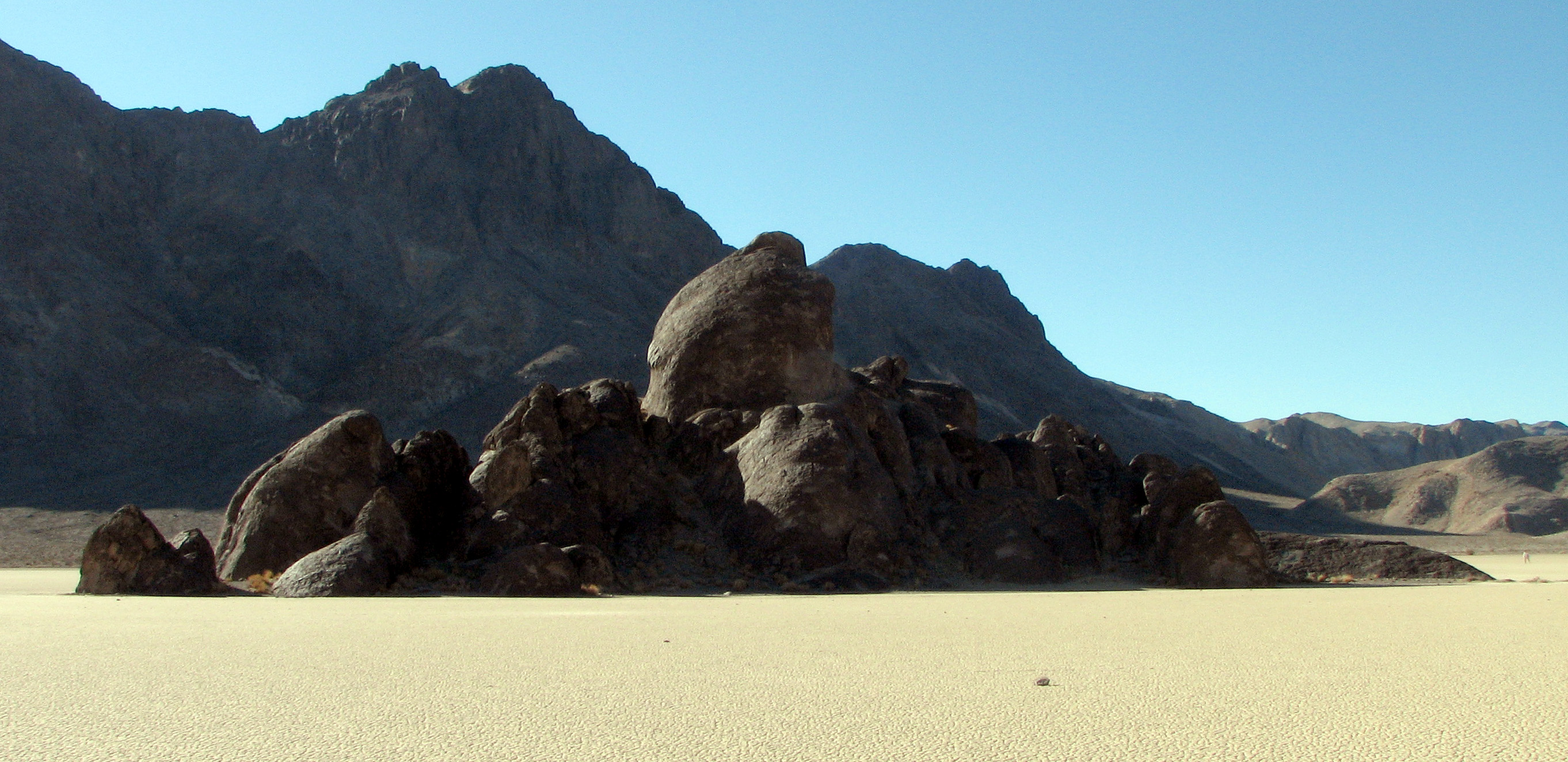
The Grandstand and Ubehebe Peak, with the Panamint Range Mountains.

== Natural history ==
As with the rest of Death Valley National Park, The Racetrack and The Grandstand receive very scant rainfall, rarely more than 2 inches in most years. Due to its elevation of 3,000-foot (910 m), the climate at The Grandstand averages slightly cooler than that of the floor of Death Valley; however, daytime high temperatures are commonly above 100 °F in mid-summer. Winds can be extreme also, due to the north-south orientation of The Racetrack, as the "moving rocks" at the south end of the playa demonstrate.

Great blue herons have been sighted atop the highest part of The Grandstand, en route during their annual migration.

== Visiting ==
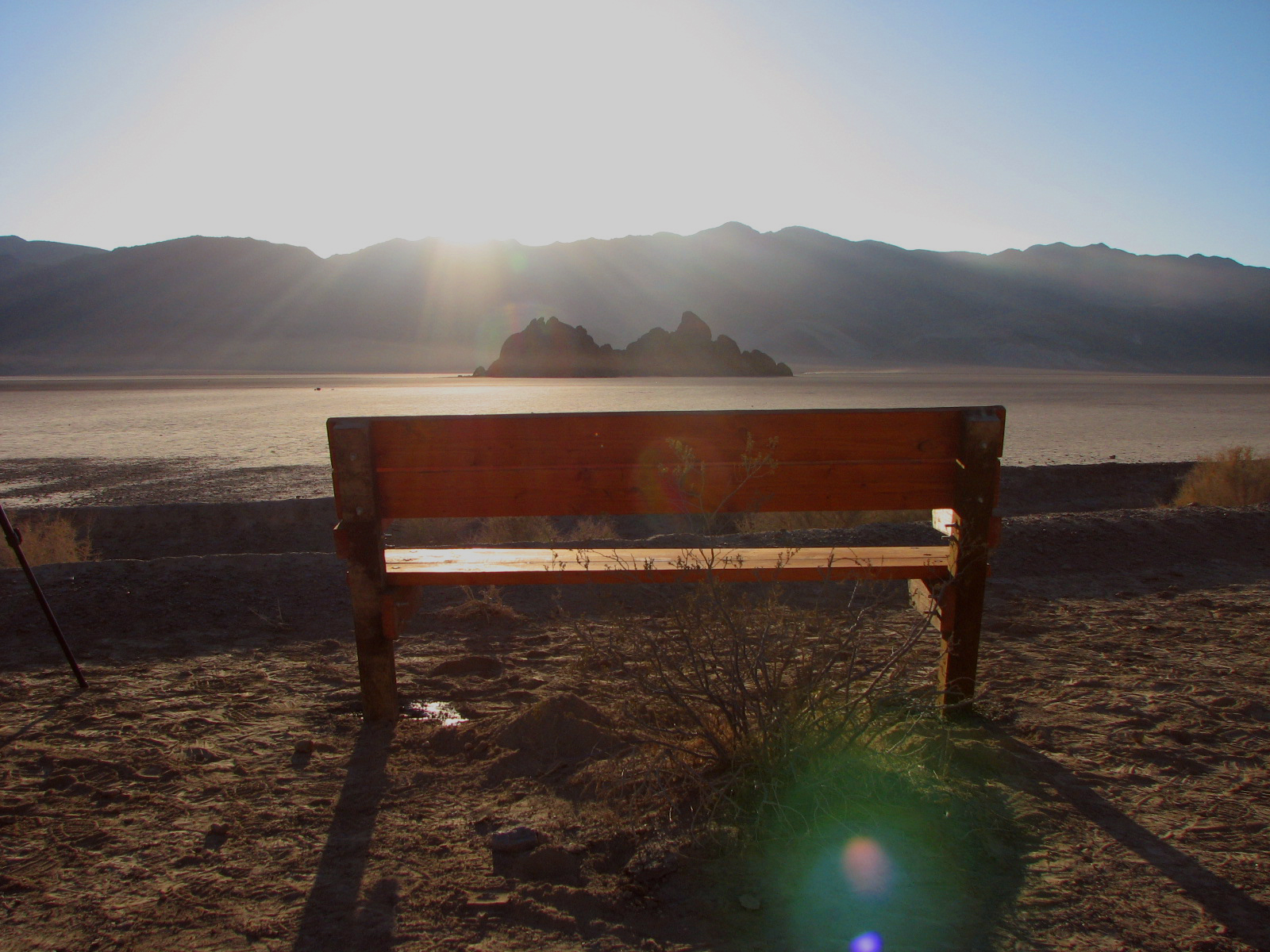
Late winter sunrise over "The Grandstand" from the 'Mano Seca Bench'

There are three roads providing vehicular access to The Grandstand. The primary route is Racetrack Road, a 27-mile (43 km) gravel road starting from the end of pavement at Ubehebe Crater, north of Scotty's Castle. This road is graded and maintained by the National Park Service and is passable by most autos, SUVs, and light trucks with at least 7 inches of ground clearance. Due to the very rough volcanic nature of the gravel road bed, all-terrain tires in good condition are highly recommended (Racetrack Road is notorious for damaging light-duty passenger car tires). The Grandstand can also be accessed from Saline Valley to the west, via Lippincott Road or Hunter Mountain Road. These roads are much rougher than Racetrack Road, and Lippincott Road in particular should only be attempted by drivers with off-road experience, in high-clearance, short-wheelbase, 4WD vehicles.

At The Grandstand, the National Park Service provides parking and descriptive signage, and docents provided a bench there to view the Grandstand, Racetrack Playa, and to the east the Cottonwood Mountains. South of The Grandstand, at the south end of The Racetrack, there is another parking area from which visitors may hike 3/4 mile east across the playa to view the "moving rocks". Racetrack Road ends two miles south of this parking area at Homestake Campground and the eastern end of Lippincott Road. Homestake is a "dry" campground, meaning there is no water, and no garbage pickup, but there is a portable toilet.

The lakebed surface is usually dry and can be freely walked upon; however, the National Park Service requests that visitors not walk on the surface when it is moist enough to leave distinctive footprints. Wheeled vehicles, including bicycles, are strictly prohibited on the playa at all times.

No camping is allowed on or adjacent to the playa; however, "primitive camping" is permitted to the north and south of the area. Signage along Racetrack Road indicates the limits of "no-camping" zones. Ubehebe Crater is another distinctive geologic feature and visual landmark in this northern section of the park. Saline Valley is located to the west, and the Eureka Valley Sand Dunes to the north. The south end of Eureka Valley Road is nearby, located 2.5 miles east of Ubehebe Crater, so visitors planning to tour both The Racetrack and Eureka Valley may wish to plan accordingly.

== See also ==
- Geology of the Death Valley area
- Places of interest in the Death Valley area
- Category: Death Valley
- Category: Geography of Inyo County, California
- Category: Rock formations in California
- Category: Flora of the California desert regions
