= Ubehebe Craters =

Volcanic field in Death Valley of California

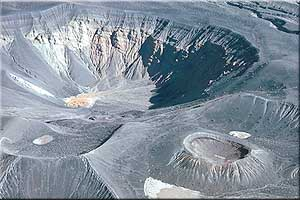
- View onto Ubehebe Crater and Little Hebe Crater

Highest point
- Elevation: 2,467 ft (752 m)
- Coordinates: 37°00′36″N 117°27′03″W

Naming
- Etymology: Etymology

Geography
- Location within California
- Parent range: Death Valley, Basin and Range Province

Geology
- Rock age: Holocene
- Mountain type: Volcanic field
- Last eruption: 150 BCE?

Climbing
- Access: Death Valley National Park

The Ubehebe Craters are a volcanic field in the northern Death Valley of California, consisting of 14–16 craters in a 3-square-kilometre (1.2 sq mi) area. The largest of the craters is the 800 metres (2,600 ft) wide and 235 metres (771 ft) deep Ubehebe Crater. Many of the craters, though, are partially buried and thus hardly recognizable. Other volcanic features there include a remnant of a scoria cone and a tuff cone.

The Ubehebe Craters are associated with a fault system that runs across them. The region has been affected by volcanism for the last 10 million years. The volcanic field is in the Death Valley National Park and is accessible to tourists. The fault system is within the tectonically active Basin and Range Province physiographic region.

Various estimates have been put forward for the age of the craters. Recent research has shown that the Ubehebe Craters all formed in a single phreatomagmatic eruption episode about 2,100 years ago, making it one of the most recent volcanic events in southern California. The risk of renewed volcanic activity is low.

== Name and research history ==
"Ubehebe" is pronounced as YOU-bee-HEE-bee and its etymology is unclear; it may mean "woman's breast" (hïbí-bici) in Owens Valley Paiute but is often mistakenly translated as "big basket". The name has been mistakenly attributed to the native Shoshone tribes, which actually call it "Tempintta Wosah", which translates as "basket in the rock" or "coyote's basket", referencing the form of the crater. The volcanoes were first identified in reconnaissance studies in 1932.

== Geomorphology and geography ==
The Ubehebe Craters lie in the northern Death Valley on the slopes of Tin Mountain in the Panamint Range/Cottonwood Mountains about 100 kilometres (62 mi) from Furnace Creek and 230 kilometres (140 mi) from Las Vegas. The area is characterized by hills known as the Ubehebe Hills. About 2 kilometres (1.2 mi) from the main crater a wash flows northward.

The volcano lies at an elevation of 752 metres (2,467 ft) and consists of two maars, Ubehebe Crater and Little Hebe Crater south of Ubehebe Crater, as well as 14–16 craters in an area of 3 square kilometres (1.2 sq mi) with an average diameter of 100–200 metres (330–660 ft). The craters are in four clusters. Many of the craters are highly eroded and covered with the products of later eruptions; some are further buried in alluvium and thus not easily recognizable.

Ubehebe Crater (which lends the field its name) is a maar with a width of 800 metres (2,600 ft) and a depth of 235 metres (771 ft) and a tuff ring around it. The largest of the Ubehebe Craters, it has excavated deep into the underlying basement. The inner slopes have noticeably different appearances across a fault that crosses the crater and display both slump deposits, gullies resulting from erosion and large debris lobes, the largest of which is 200 metres (660 ft) long and 100 metres (330 ft) wide. At the floor of the crater lies a playa lake, which sometimes flooded. The rim of the crater is covered with black volcanic ash, and it is surrounded by volcanic deposits that reach a thickness of 50 metres (160 ft) before thinning with distance. Scorpionweeds and sundrops are occasionally observed growing on the margin of Ubehebe Crater.

Little Hebe Crater is a tuff cone whose crater is 100 metres (330 ft) wide and 20 metres (66 ft) deep. It is surrounded by pyroclastic surge deposits that show striking white and black bands. Little Hebe seems to have formed within an elongated depression known as the "Amphitheater". The remnants of a scoria cone are between this depression and Ubehebe Crater. The other craters form a group west of Ubehebe Crater, and another isolated crater is southwest of the group. Only Ubehebe Crater appears to reach the nonvolcanic basement; the other craters are embedded in ejecta.

Pyroclastic deposits reach distances of up to 4 kilometres (2.5 mi) from Ubehebe Crater and cover an area of about 15 square kilometres (5.8 sq mi) with a layer less than 50 metres (160 ft) thick; they are classified as base surges, which are turbulent flows formed when magma and water interact with water in an explosive manner. The deposits are graded and show wave-like structures that form conspicuous ripples and wavefields where exposed by stream erosion or road cuts. Blocks with sizes of up to 15 centimetres (5.9 in) are embedded in the deposits, which are covered by volcanic ash, lapilli, and lava bombs.

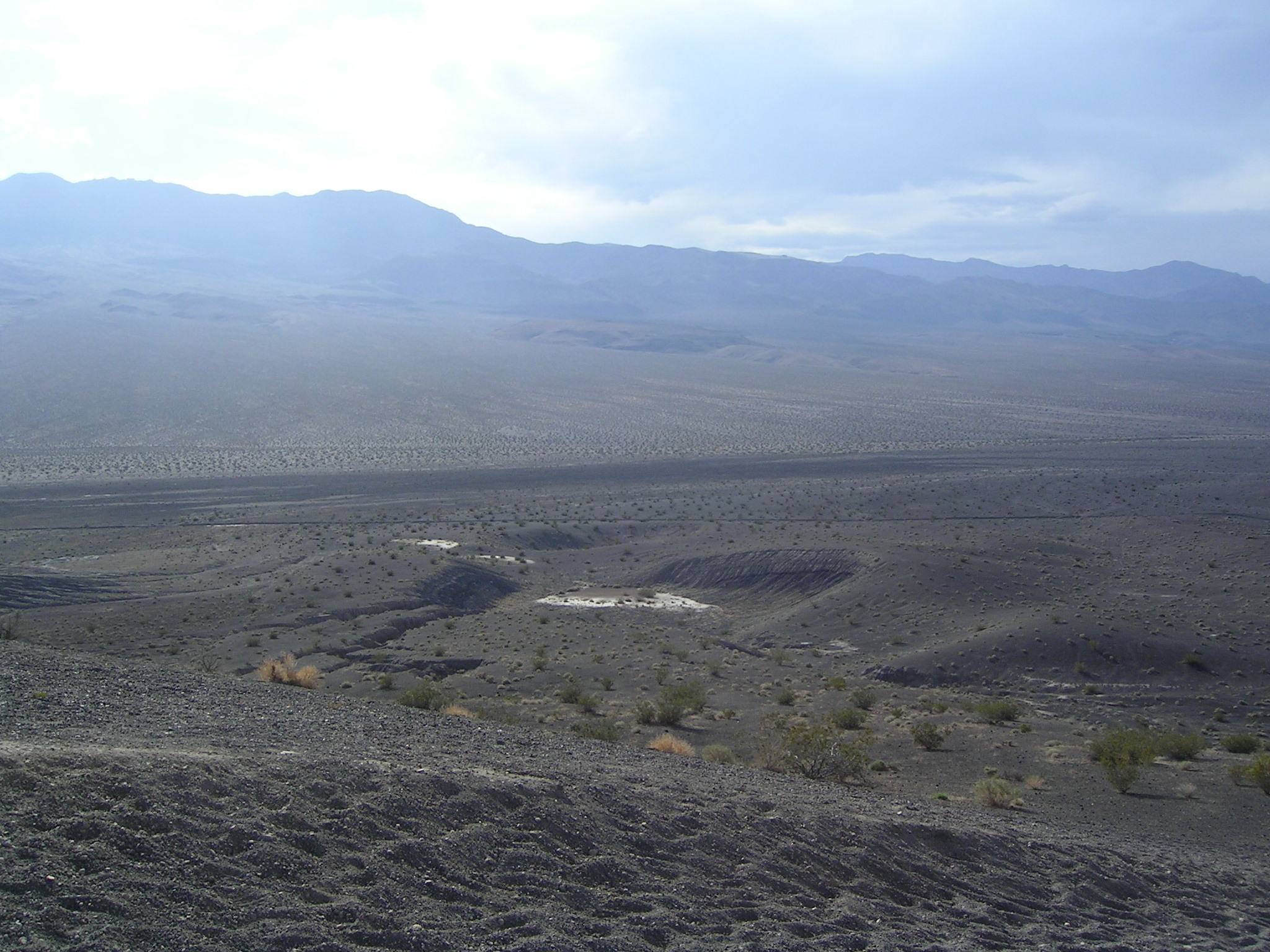
Ubehebe Craters

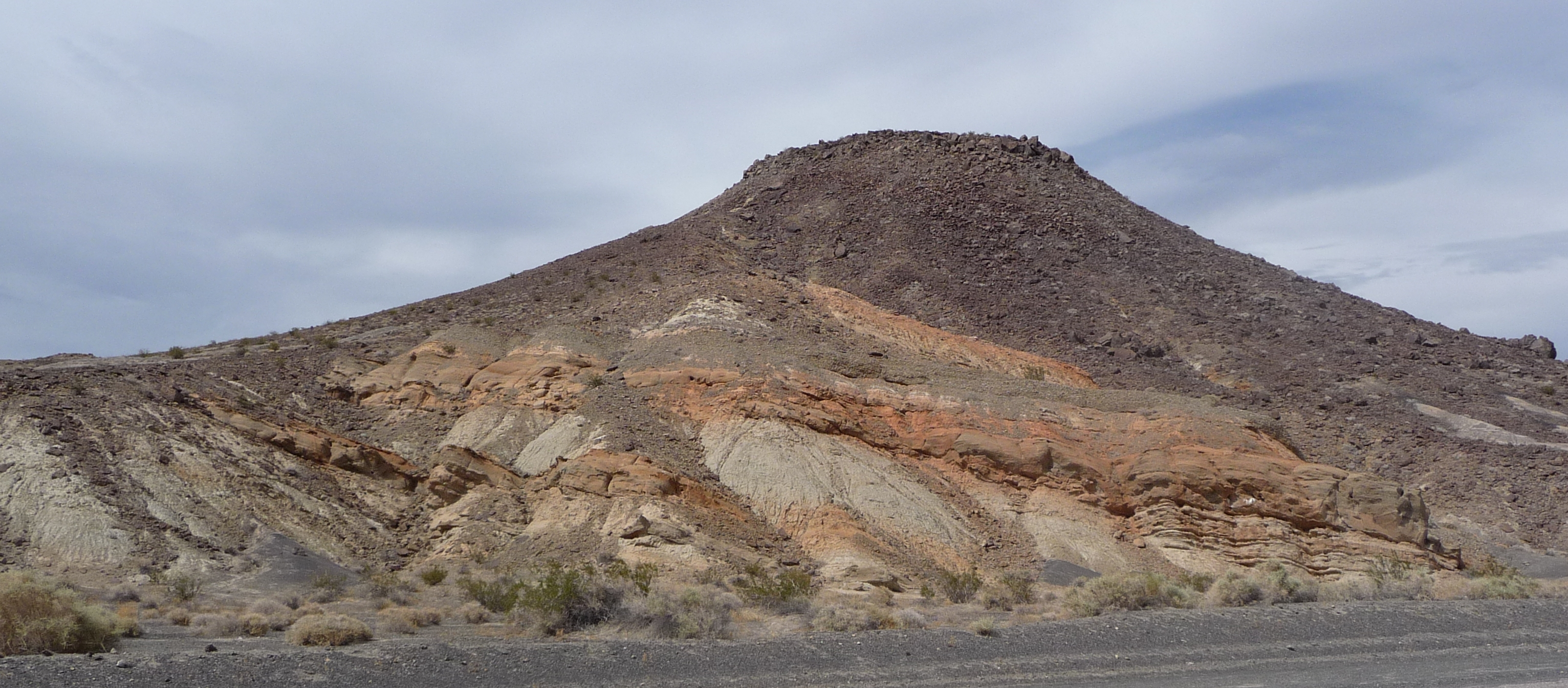
Volcanic outcrops in the Ubehebe Craters

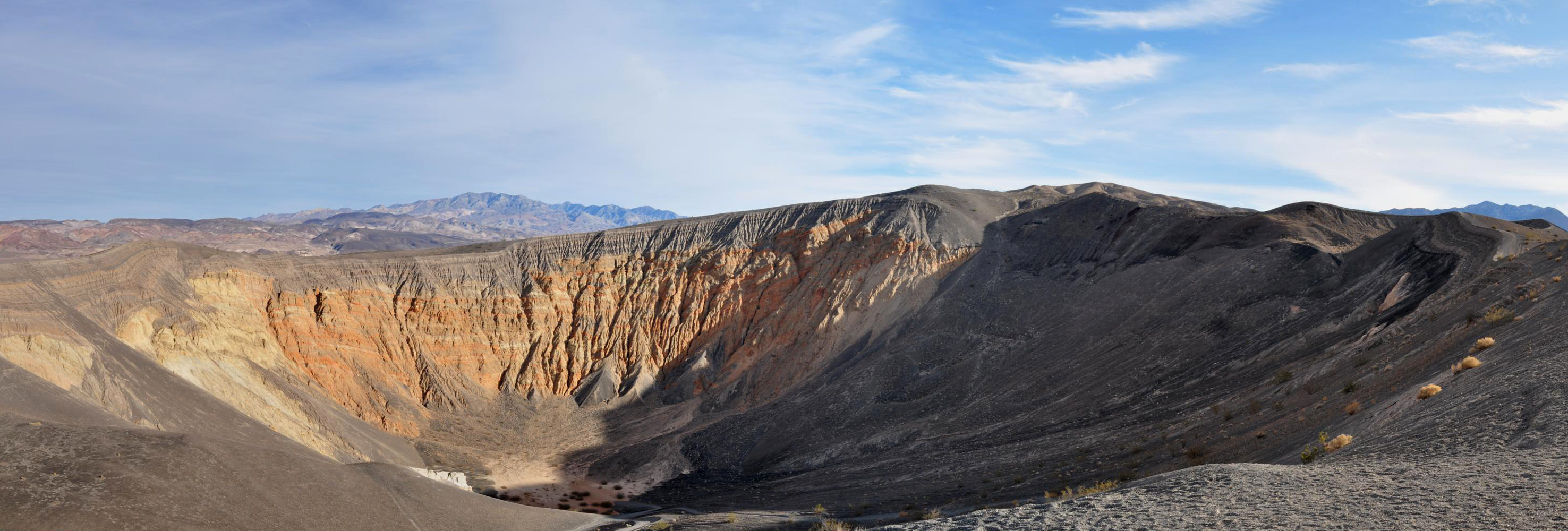
Ubehebe Crater

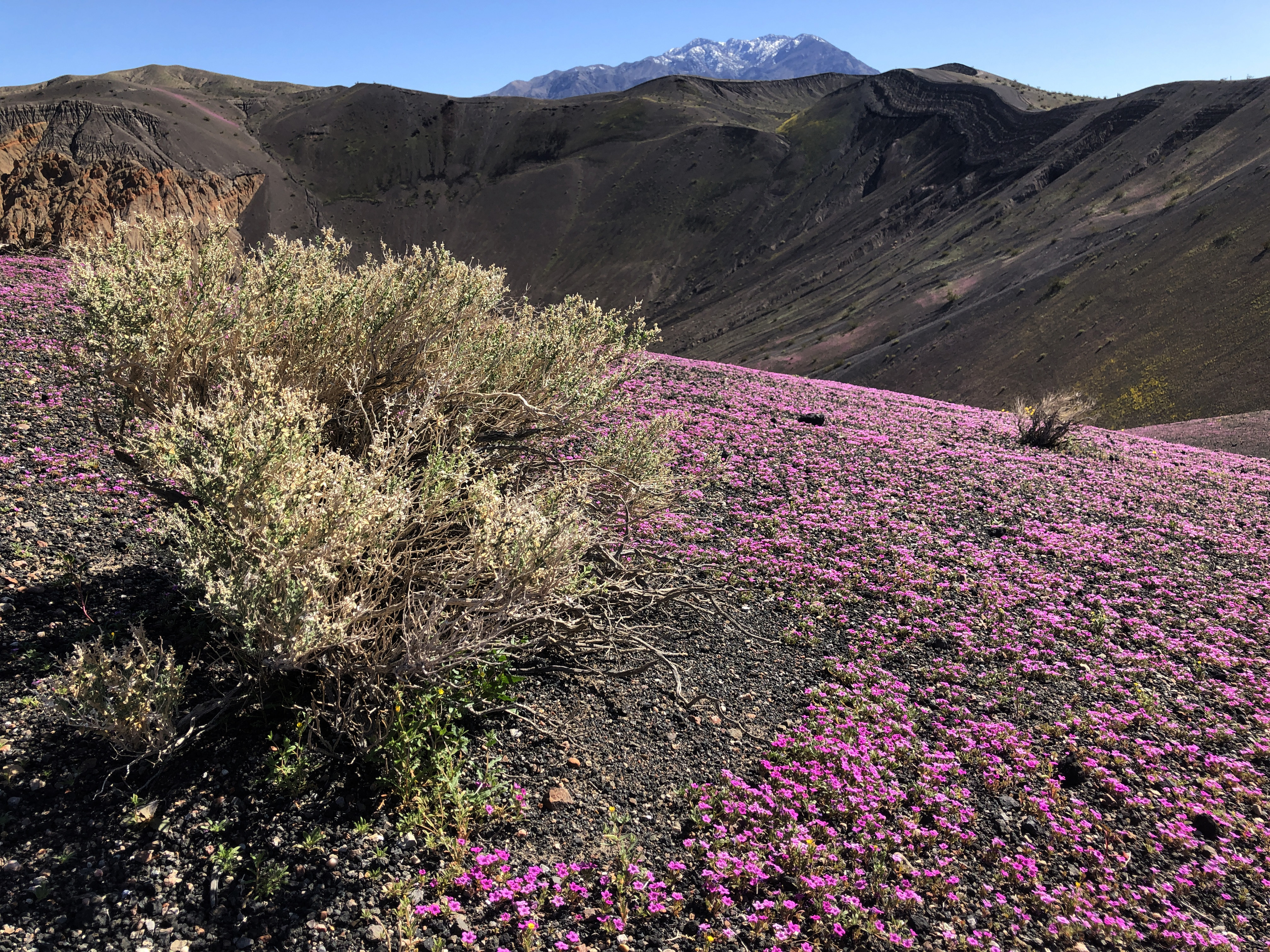
Ubehebe Crater during an April bloom

== Geology ==
Death Valley is part of the Basin and Range Province, which is characterized by parallel mountain ranges and valleys. Since about 10 million years ago, the region around Death Valley has been subject to volcanic activity that has given rise to Ubehebe Craters, Yucca Mountain and a 400,000 years old cinder cone in southern Death Valley. This volcanic activity is of transitional alkaline character and has decreased in volume over time. Ubehebe Craters is fairly isolated from the other volcanic fields in the region.

The Ubehebe Craters formed within sedimentary rocks, which crop out in the craters. Conglomerates and sandstones form a 0.5-kilometre-thick (1,600 ft) sequence under Ubehebe Crater; they are part of the so-called Navadu Formation. Beyond this mostly Miocene formation are Paleozoic carbonates. The Cottonwood Mountains consist of Paleozoic, Mesozoic, and in part Tertiary sedimentary rocks; most of the terrain west and north of the Ubehebe Craters is covered by modern alluvium.

The Ubehebe Craters are atop a fault that forms the edge of the Tin Mountain range; adjacent to the craters the fault has formed scarps. This fault is also known as the Tin Mountain fault, which cuts through Ubehebe Crater and branches out in a diffuse set of faults. This fault intersects the nearby Northern Death Valley fault close to the Ubehebe Craters; the latter fault may have ruptured at the same time or soon after an eruption in the volcanic field.

=== Composition ===
The Ubehebe Craters have erupted alkali basalt and sideromelane. Phenocrysts include augite, clinopyroxene, kaersutite, olivine, and plagioclase. The chemistry of the volcanic rocks is very homogeneous between various vents and isotope ratios indicate that the magmas are derived from Precambrian mantle material that underlies the Mojave lithosphere. Also, country rocks like gneiss, quartz, and syenite were expelled by the eruptions in the form of blocks that are dispersed around the craters, and some deposits exposed in the walls of Ubehebe Crater are discoloured.

== Climate ==
Summer temperatures at the Ubehebe Craters can be quite high while winter temperatures often fall below freezing. During the Little Ice Age, temperatures were low enough to allow the development of snow patches in the Ubehebe Craters, which then left nivation landforms.

Present-day precipitation in Death Valley is about 56 millimetres per year (2.2 in/year) with large year-to-year variability but was higher during past pluvial periods such as between 17,500 and 15,000 years ago. Today, precipitation usually occurs in the form of sudden rainfall that can trigger substantial erosion and sometimes generates ephemeral lakes in the craters.

The volcanic eruptions at Ubehebe Craters involved significant amounts of water, perhaps implying that they took place under wetter than present climates, but later it was found that the Ubehebe Craters formed during the relatively dry Medieval Warm Period and that the phreatomagmatic activity can explained by the presence of only small amounts of groundwater.

== Eruption history ==
The Ubehebe Craters are considered to be of Holocene age. They formed in a single episode about 2,100 years ago around 150 BCE. The timing of eruptive activity was determined with the help of archeomagnetic dating, beryllium-10 radiometric dating, and tephrochronology. This makes Ubehebe Craters the most recent basaltic eruption in the continental United States and, together with the Salton Buttes, one of the youngest in southern California. Earlier age estimates of the Ubehebe Craters ranged from several hundred to several million years, with later estimates assuming the occurrence of several episodes within 4,000 years until 800 years ago.

Eruptions commenced with the formation of the scoria cone. Later activity became hydrovolcanic once the magma started interacting with water, resulting in steam explosions which formed the two clusters of craters starting with the "Amphitheater", continuing with the western craters and ending with Ubehebe Crater. The explosion energy of the explosion that formed Ubehebe Crater has been estimated to be at least 1 petajoule (280,000,000 kWh). Fragmented lava and rocks were blown high into the air during the explosions, and covered an area of 39 square kilometres (15 mi^{2}) when they fell down again. Base surges were erupted from the craters and expanded away from them, channelled by pre-existing topography. In the case of Little Hebe Crater, it is likely that a plug obstructed the crater early in the eruption sequence and was violently ejected, leaving a deposit of vesicular basalt around the crater. The whole episode lasted a few days or weeks, a few months at most. Ashfall from the eruption impacted nearby Shoshone communities; the eruption probably would have been a spectacular sight but there is no evidence of it in the oral tradition of local people.

After the eruptions, erosion carved gullies into the pyroclastic deposits, largely following the paths of the pre-eruption drainages and forming exposures of the volcanic deposits. Ephemeral crater lakes formed in some craters, leaving clay deposits. In the present day, the main Ubehebe Crater at times contains water. There is no evidence of geothermal activity and here does not appear to be a magma reservoir underneath the volcano. However, sulfur degassing was recorded after the 2019 Ridgecrest earthquakes.

== Human use ==
A paved road passes north and west of Ubehebe Crater and a parking lot is on its rim, which is surrounded by a trail. Another path descends to the bottom of the crater.

Tourists have been visiting the Ubehebe Craters for a long time. The volcanoes are in the northern part of Death Valley National Park and the desert scenery of the craters have been described as picturesque. Hazards stem mainly from the often exhausting paths and the loose, unstable ground when descending into the Ubehebe Crater.

=== Hazards and monitoring ===
The discovery of recent Holocene activity, which was initially assumed to have been protracted over time, has led to the California Volcano Observatory commencing volcano monitoring at the Ubehebe Craters, including the installation of one seismometer. The volcano is classified as a "Moderate Threat" volcano in the USGS volcanic threat assessment. An incomplete circular 10-kilometre-wide (6.2 mi) volcano hazard zone has been defined for the Ubehebe Craters, which reaches Scotty's Castle, within which pyroclastic surges and steam blasts could be expected in case of renewed eruptions.

Future eruptions of the Ubehebe Craters may impact the almost a million annual Death Valley National Park visitors and the about 100 people who live in the region; however, the apparently monogenetic nature of the Ubehebe Craters implies that the risk for renewed eruptions is low.

== See also ==
- Geology of the Death Valley area
- Racetrack Playa
