= Teakettle Junction, California =

Coordinates: 36°45′37″N 117°32′33″W

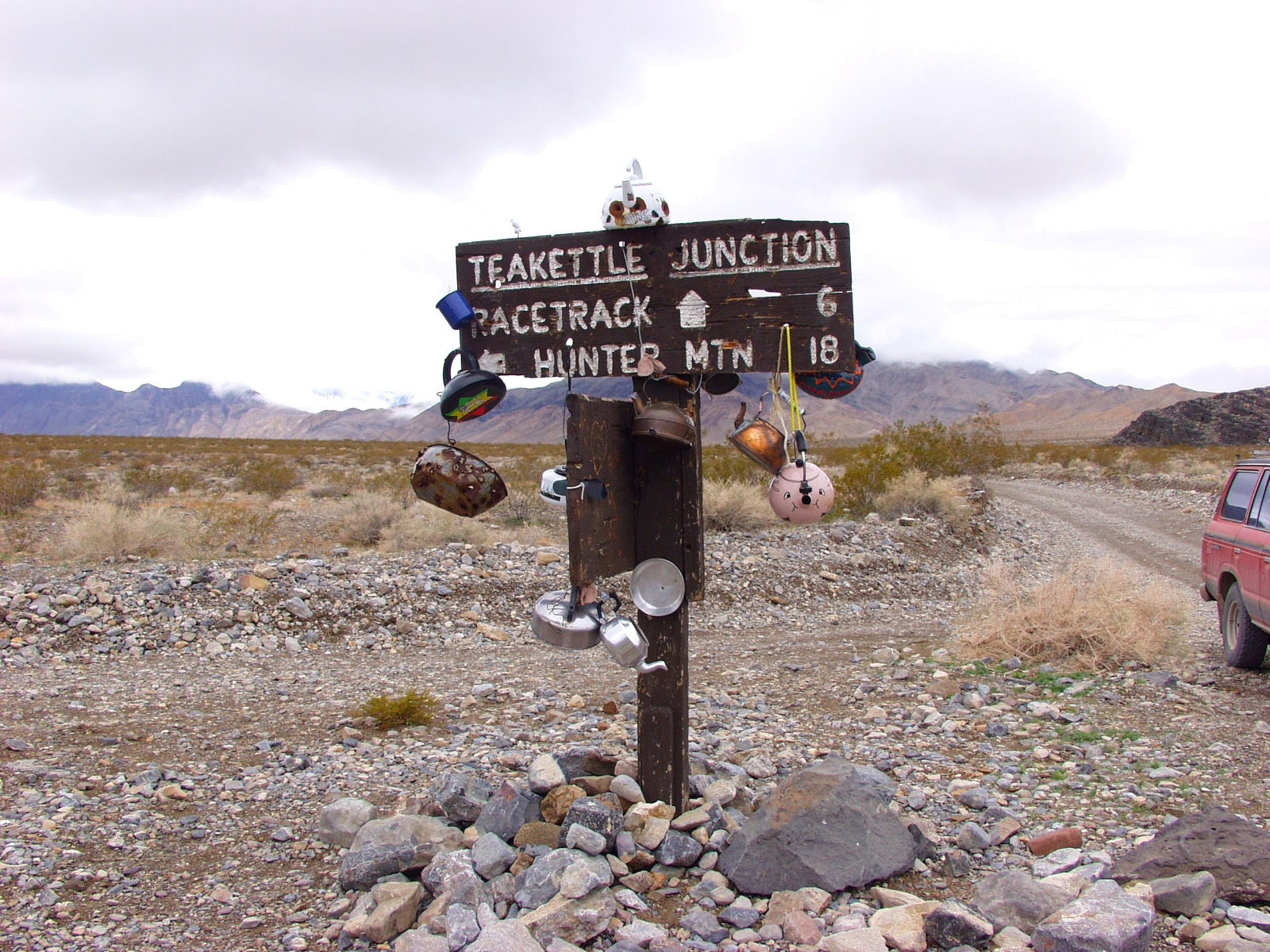
Teakettle Junction in 2008

Teakettle Junction is a road junction in Inyo County, California. It lies at an elevation of 4,150 feet (1,260 m) in Death Valley near the Racetrack Playa and Ubehebe Crater.

At the junction where the unimproved road from Ubehebe Crater meets roads to the Racetrack Playa and Hunter Mountain, there is a sign reading "Teakettle Junction." While the origin of the name is unknown, it has become a tradition for visitors to attach teakettles to the sign with messages written on them. National Park Service rangers will sometimes remove a number of teakettles when there are too many.

The rock at the junction includes the bedrock sandstone of the Eureka Quartzite strata.

== See also ==
- Places of interest in the Death Valley area
