= Grandstand (disambiguation) =

A grandstand is a large and normally permanent structure for seating spectators.

Grandstand may also refer to:

== Television and radio ==
- Grandstand (TV programme), a 1958–2007 British television sports programme
- GrandStand (NFL on NBC pregame show), 1975–1976
- ABC Radio Grandstand, an Australian radio sports show

== Other uses ==
- Grandstand (US Open), a tennis court at the USTA Billie Jean King National Tennis Center, New York City, U.S.
- Grandstand (game manufacturer), a UK/New Zealand console and game manufacturer
- The Grandstand, a natural rock monolith in Death Valley National Park, California, U.S.
- Political grandstanding, also known as Political posturing, the use of speech or actions to gain political support through emotional or affective appeals.
