= Ubehebe Peak =

Double summit mountain

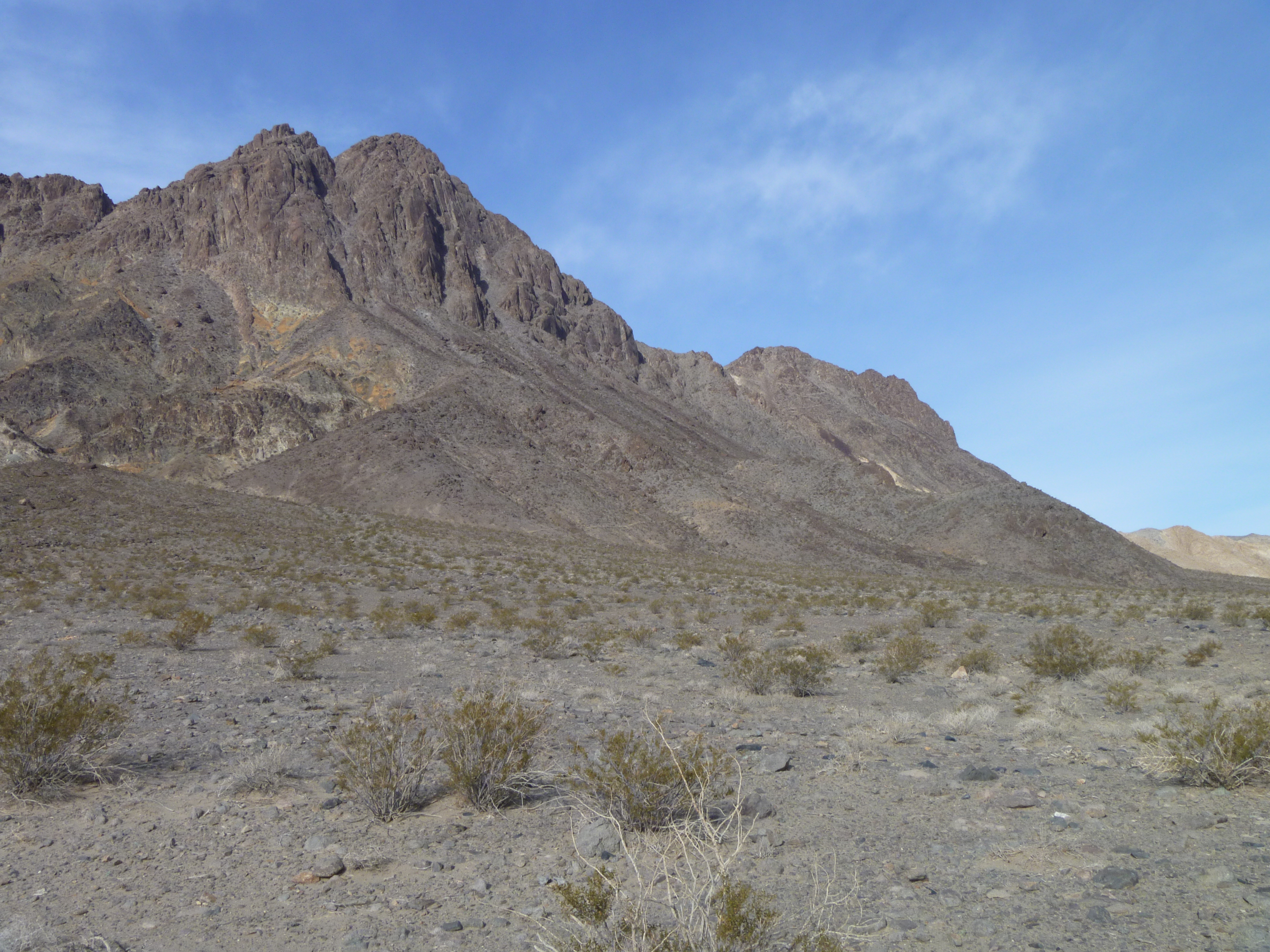
- Ubehebe Peak as seen from the old miner's trail

Highest point
- Elevation: 5,678 ft (1,731 m)
- Coordinates: 36.6910°N 117.5856°W

Geography
- Location within California Location within the United States
- Location: Death Valley National Park, CA
- Parent range: Last Chance Range

Ubehebe Peak is a double summit mountain located within Death Valley National Park, in Inyo County, California. Ubehebe Peak rises over the west side of the Racetrack Playa, and lies at the south end of the Last Chance Range.

Ubehebe Peak can be accessed through the unpaved Racetrack Valley Road. Experienced hikers can ascend the mountain by the old miner's trail, which leads to the saddle between the two peaks.

== Etymology ==
The name "Ubehebe" (pronounced YOO-bee-HEE-bee), which is shared by the nearby Ubehebe Crater, was likely given by the Paiute Tribe that resides in the Inyo County region. Although there is a popular misconception that the name "Ubehebe" means "big basket," the word likely originated from the Paiute term "hïbi-bici," which translates to "woman's breasts."

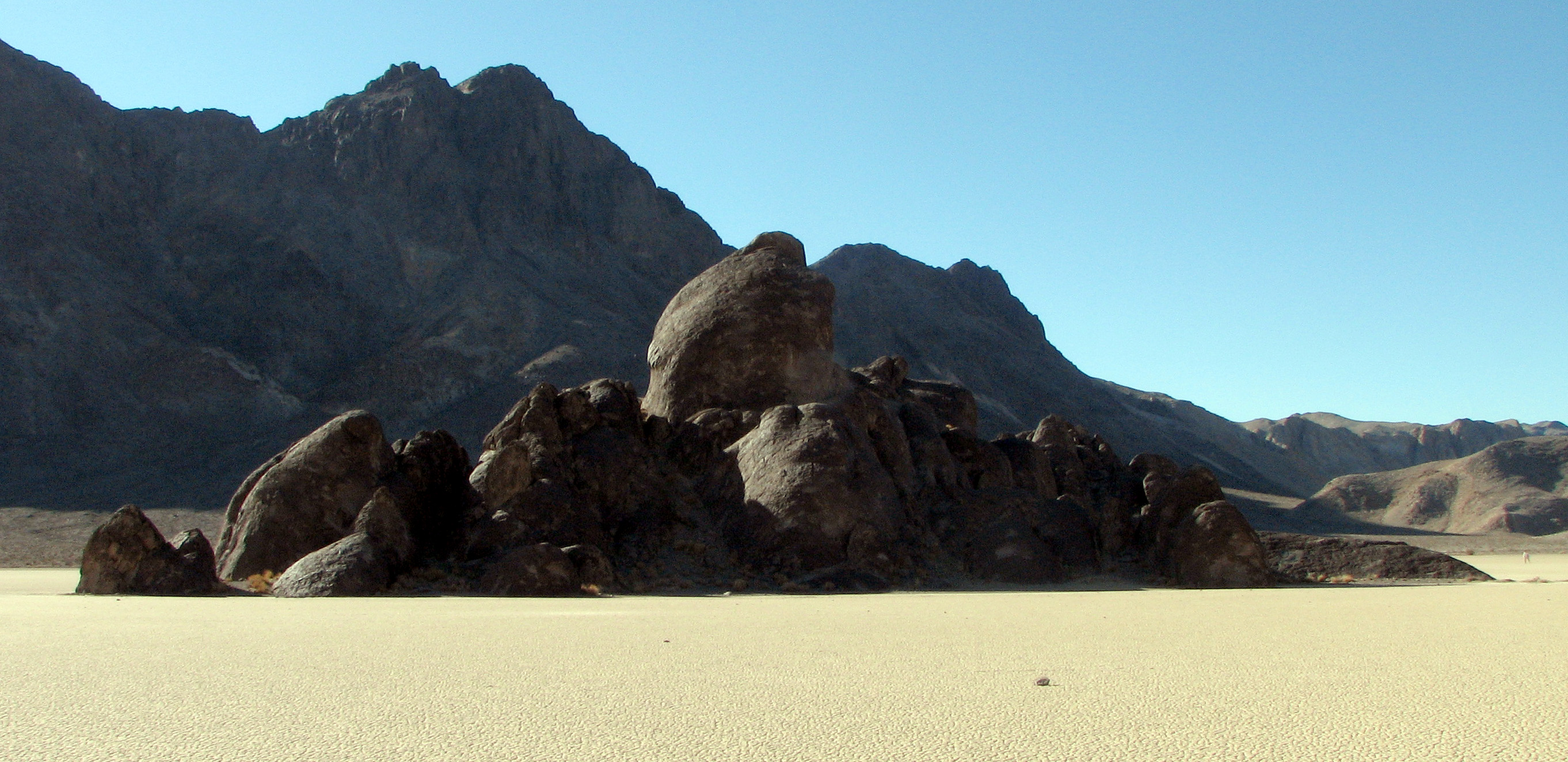
Ubehebe Peak seen from behind The Grandstand, a feature of the Racetrack Playa

== Geography ==
Ubehebe Peak has an elevation of 5,678 ft. The mountain resides between Saline Valley, which lies to the west, and the Cottonwood Mountains range, to the east. Ubehebe Peak is the southernmost major summit of the Last Chance Range.

== Geology ==
The foundation of Ubehebe Peak is primarily formed of quartz monzonite, as well as syenite. The most common rocks in the area are metadolomite and metalimestone. Copper oxide and iron oxide have also been found within the contact-metamorphic rock of the region. Although the region was surveyed and briefly developed for the production of copper, economic production was considered unfeasible due to the low quantity and grade of the minerals. However, the area held a productive lead mining site in the early 20th century.
