= Dry lake =

Area that contained a standing surface water body

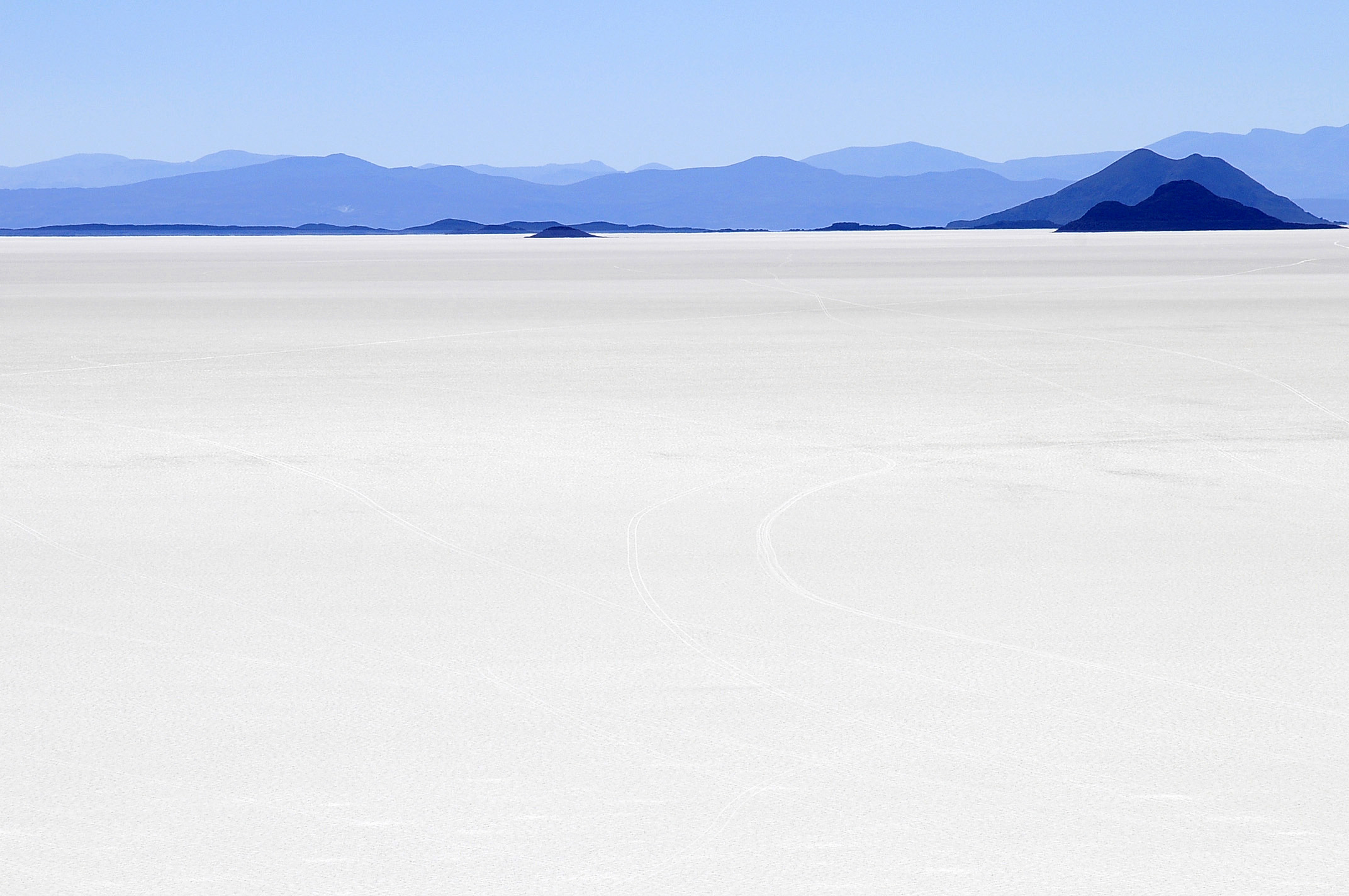
The Salar de Uyuni, in Bolivia, the world's largest salt flat

A dry lake bed, also called a playa (/ˈplaɪ.ə/), is a basin or depression that formerly contained a standing surface water body, which disappears when evaporation processes exceed recharge. If the floor of a dry lake is covered by deposits of alkaline compounds, it is called an alkali flat. If covered with salt, it is called a salt flat.

== Terminology ==
If its basin is primarily salt, then a dry lake bed is called a salt pan, pan, or salt flat (the latter being a remnant of a salt lake). Hardpan is the dry terminus of an internally drained basin in a dry climate, a designation typically used in the Great Basin of the western United States.

The Chott el Djerid in Tunisia

Another term for dry lake bed is playa. The Spanish word playa (pronounced [ˈplaʝa]) literally means "beach". Dry lakes are known by this name in some parts of Mexico and the western United States. This term is used e.g. on the Llano Estacado and other parts of the Southern High Plains and is commonly used to address paleolake sediments in the Sahara like Lake Ptolemy.

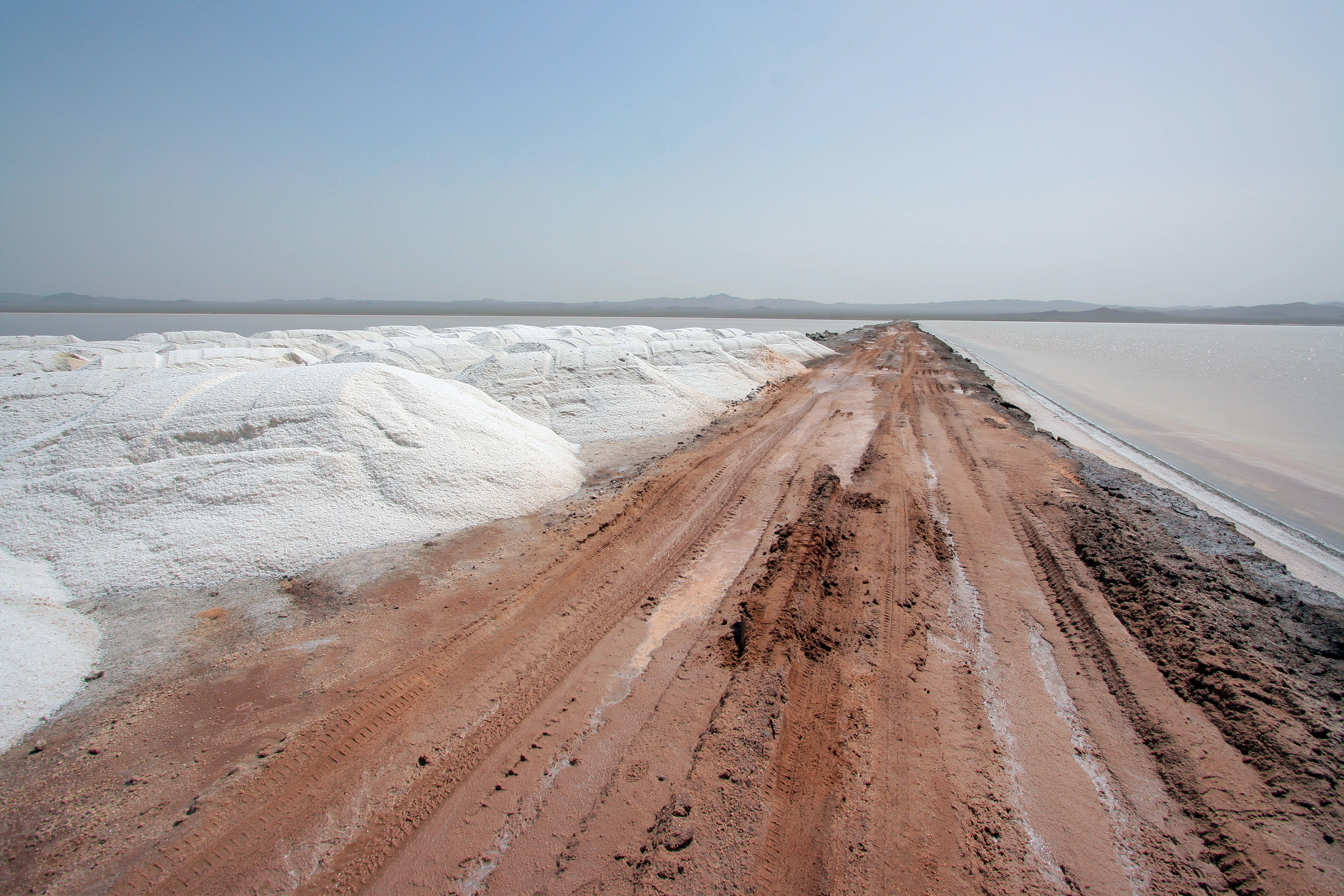
Namak Lake, Iran

In South America, the usual term for a dry lake bed is salar or salina, Spanish for salt pan.

Pan is the term used in most of South Africa. These may include the small round highveld pans, typical of the Chrissiesmeer area, to the extensive pans of the Northern Cape province.

Terms used in Australia include salt pans (where evaporite minerals are present) and clay pans.

In Arabic, a salt flat is called a sabkha (also spelled sabkhah, subkha or sebkha) or shott (chott). In Central Asia, a similar "cracked mud" salt flat is known as a takyr. In Iran salt flats are called kavir.

== Formation ==
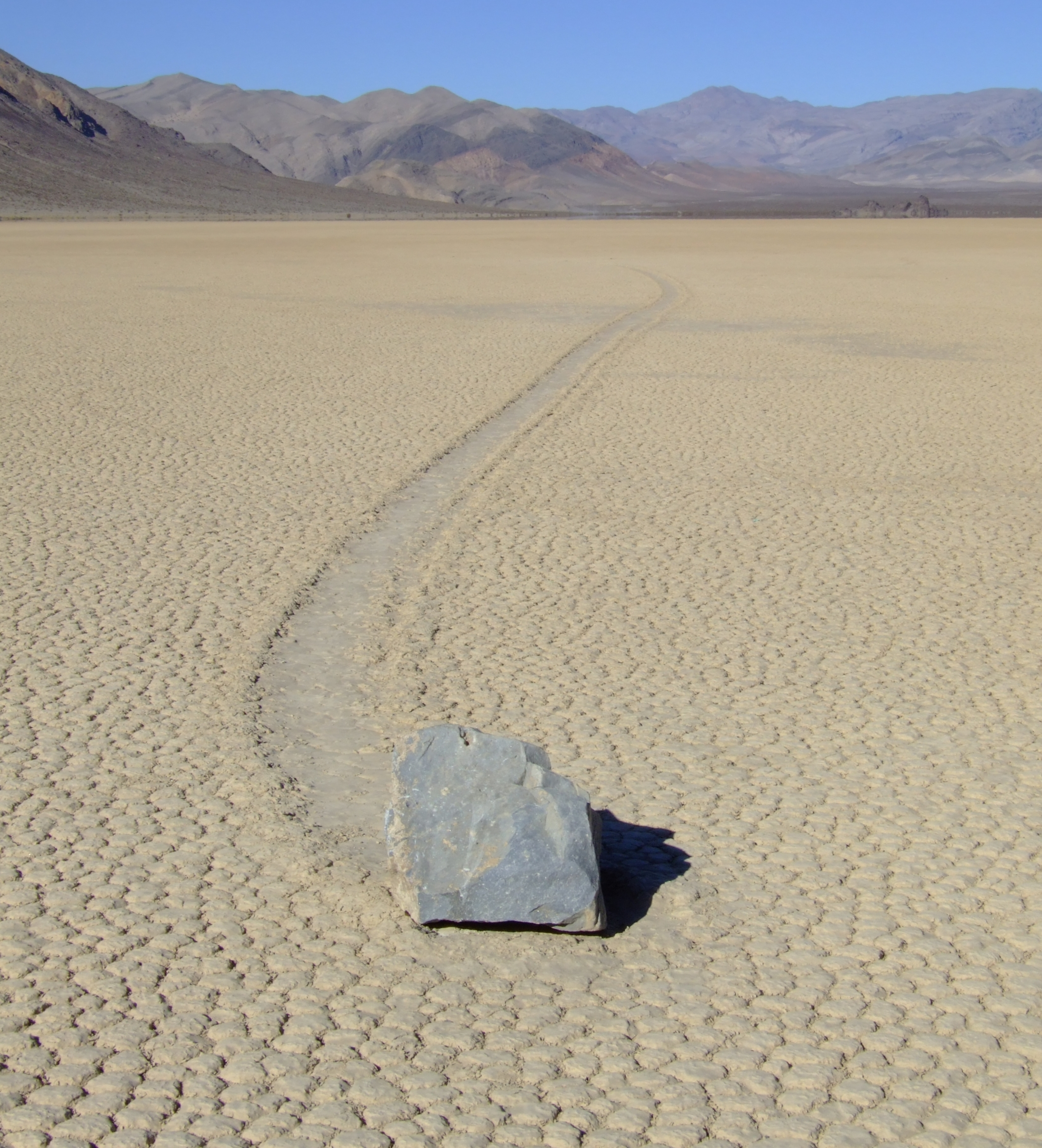
Sailing stone in Racetrack Playa

A dry lake is formed when water from rain or other sources, like intersection with a water table, flows into a dry depression in the landscape, creating a pond or lake. If the total annual evaporation rate exceeds the total annual inflow, the depression will eventually become dry again, forming a dry lake. Salts originally dissolved in the water precipitate out and are left behind, gradually building up over time. A dry lake appears as a flat bed of clay, generally encrusted with precipitated salts. These evaporite minerals are a concentration of weathering products such as sodium carbonate, borax, and other salts. In deserts, a dry lake may be found in an area ringed by bajadas.

Dry lakes are typically formed in semi-arid to arid regions of the world. The largest concentration of dry lakes (nearly 22,000) is in the southern High Plains of Texas and eastern New Mexico. Most dry lakes are small. However, Salar de Uyuni in Bolivia, near Potosí, the largest salt flat in the world, comprises 4,085 square miles (10,582 square km).

Many dry lakes contain shallow water during the rainy season, especially during wet years. If the layer of water is thin and is moved around the dry lake bed by wind, an exceedingly hard and smooth surface may develop. Thicker layers of water may result in a "cracked-mud" surface and teepee structure desiccation features. If there is very little water, dunes can form.

The Racetrack Playa, located in Death Valley, California, features a geological phenomenon known as "sailing stones" that leave "racetrack" imprints as they slowly move across the surface without human or animal intervention. These rocks have been recently filmed in motion by the Scripps Institution of Oceanography at the University of California, San Diego and are due to a perfect coincidence of events. First, the playa has to fill with water, which must be deep enough to form floating ice during winter, but still shallow enough that the rocks are exposed. When the temperature drops at night, this pond freezes into thin sheets of "windowpane" ice, which then must be thick enough to maintain strength, but thin enough to move freely. Finally, when the sun comes out, the ice melts and cracks into floating panels; these are blown across the playa by light winds, propelling the rocks in front of them. The stones only move once every two or three years and most tracks last for three or four years.

== Ecology ==
While a dry lake bed is itself typically devoid of vegetation, they are commonly ringed by shadscale, saltbrush and other salt-tolerant plants that provide critical winter fodder for livestock and other herbivores.

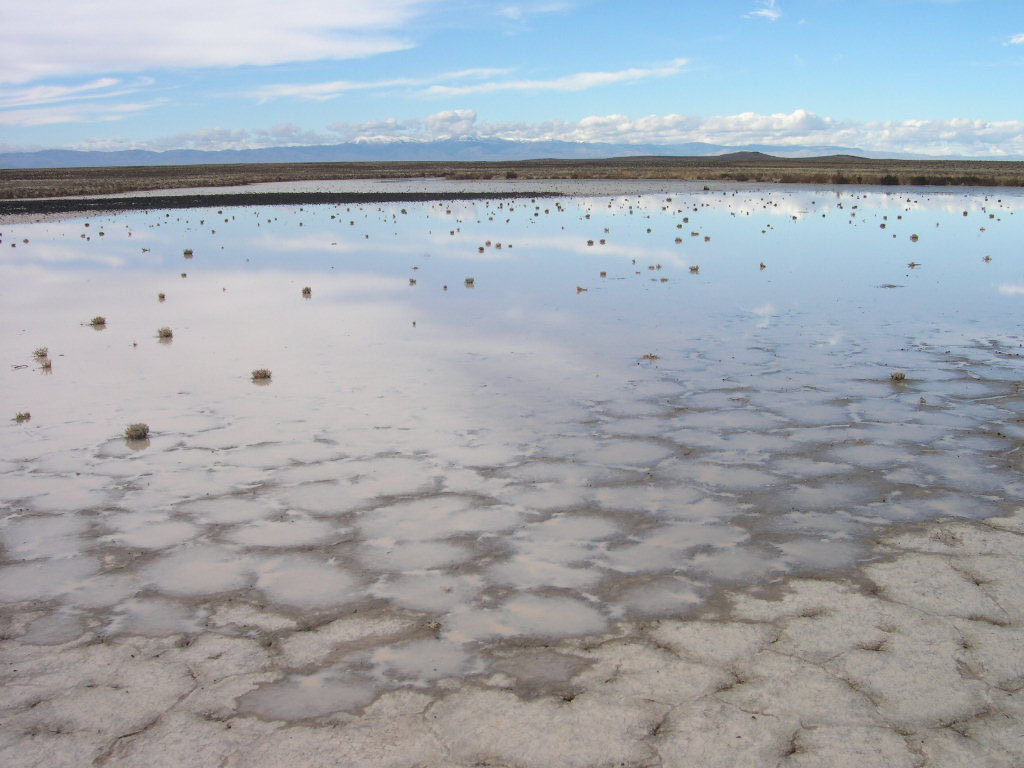
Playa in southwest Idaho, home to a number of rare species that occur nowhere else including Lepidium davisii (Davis' peppergrass) and Branchinecta raptor - a recently discovered giant fairy shrimp.

In southwest Idaho and parts of Nevada and Utah there are a number of rare species that occur nowhere else but in the inhospitable environment of seasonally flooded playas. A new species of giant fairy shrimp was found in 2006. Although a large predatory species, it evaded detection because of the murkiness of the playa's water caused by winds and a fine clay load. This shrimp species is able to regenerate using tiny undetectable cysts that can remain in a dry lake bed for years until conditions are optimum for hatching.

Lepidium davisii is another rare species, a perennial plant whose habitat is restricted to playas in southern Idaho and northern Nevada.

Far from major rivers or lakes, playas are often the only water available to wildlife in the desert. Antelope and other wildlife gather there after rainstorms to drink.

Threats to dry lakes include pollution from concentrated animal feeding operations such as cattle feedlots and dairies. Results are erosion; fertilizer, pesticide and sediment runoff from farms; and overgrazing. A non-native shrub that has been used for rangeland restoration in the west, Kochia prostrata, also poses a significant threat to playas and their associated rare species, as it is capable of crowding out native vegetation and draining a playa's standing water because of its root growth.

== Human use ==
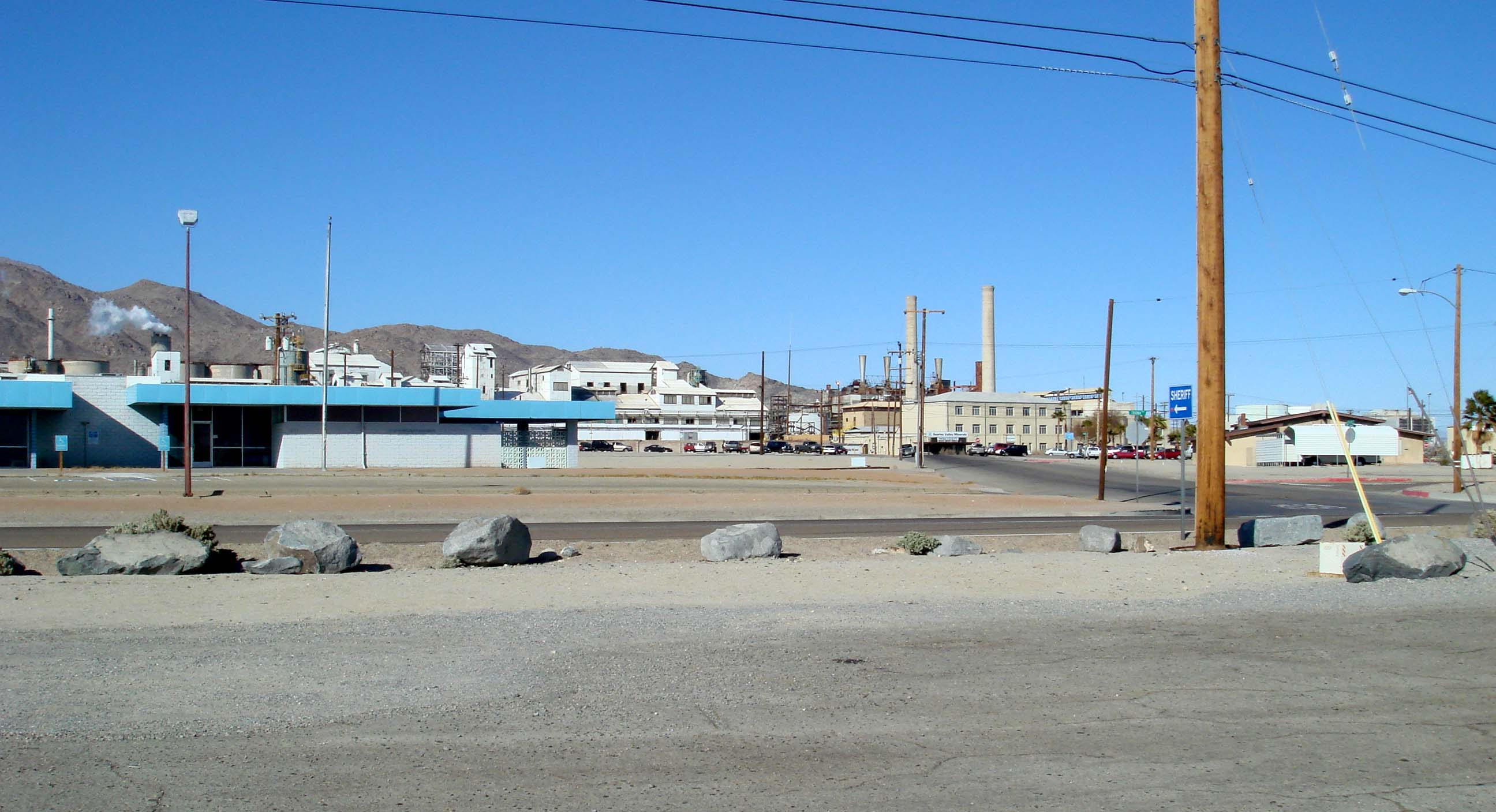
The Mosaic Company chemical plant processes brines from Searles Dry Lake to make such products as trona

The extremely flat, smooth, and hard surfaces of dry lake beds make them ideal for fast motor vehicles and motorcycles. Large-sized dry lakes are excellent spots for pursuing land speed records, as the smoothness of the surface allows low-clearance vehicles to travel very fast without any risk of disruption by surface irregularities, and the path traveled has no obstacles to avoid. The dry lake beds at Bonneville Salt Flats in Utah and Black Rock Desert in Nevada have both been used for setting land speed records. Lake Eyre and Lake Gairdner in South Australia have also been used for various land speed record attempts. Dry lake beds that rarely fill with water are sometimes used as locations for air bases for similar reasons. Examples include Groom Lake at Area 51 in Nevada and Edwards Air Force Base (known initially as Muroc Dry Lake) in California.

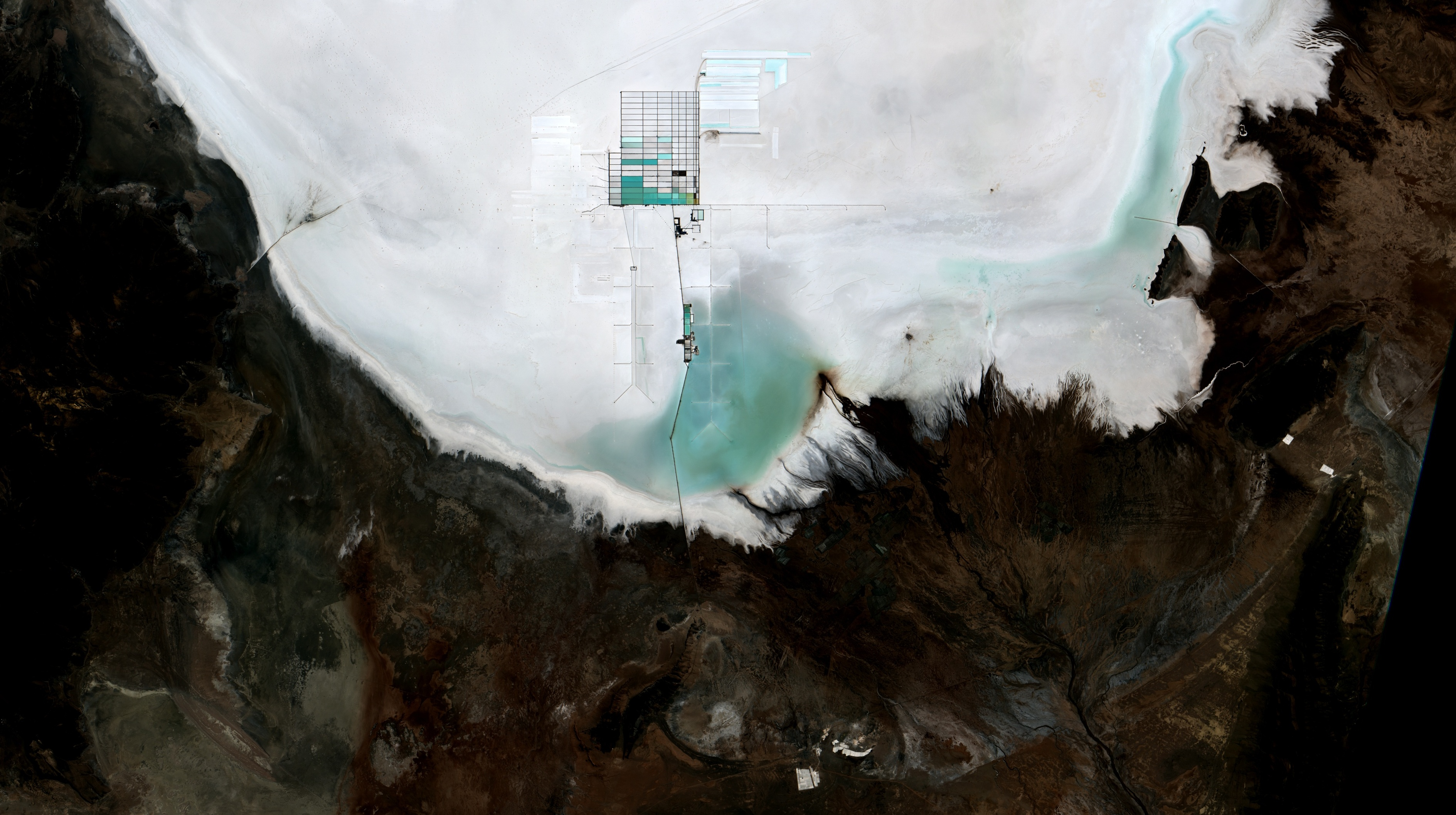
Satellite view of a lithium brine extraction field in the Salar de Uyuni, Bolivia

Brines from the subsurface of dry lakes are often exploited for valuable minerals in solution. See, for example, Searles Dry Lake and Lithium resources.

Under United States law, a "playa lake" may be considered isolated wetlands and may be eligible to enroll in the new wetlands component of the Conservation Reserve Program, enacted in the 2002 farm bill (P.L. 107–171, Sec. 2101).

The Burning Man yearly event takes place in a playa in the Black Rock Desert in western Nevada every year.

Fangfang Yao et al (2023), at the University of Virginia reported that more than half of the world's large lakes are drying up. They assessed almost 2,000 large lakes using satellite measurements combined with climate and hydrological models. They found that unsustainable human use, changes in rainfall and run-off, sedimentation, and rising temperatures have driven lake levels down globally, with 53% of lakes showing a decline from 1992 to 2020.

== Gallery ==
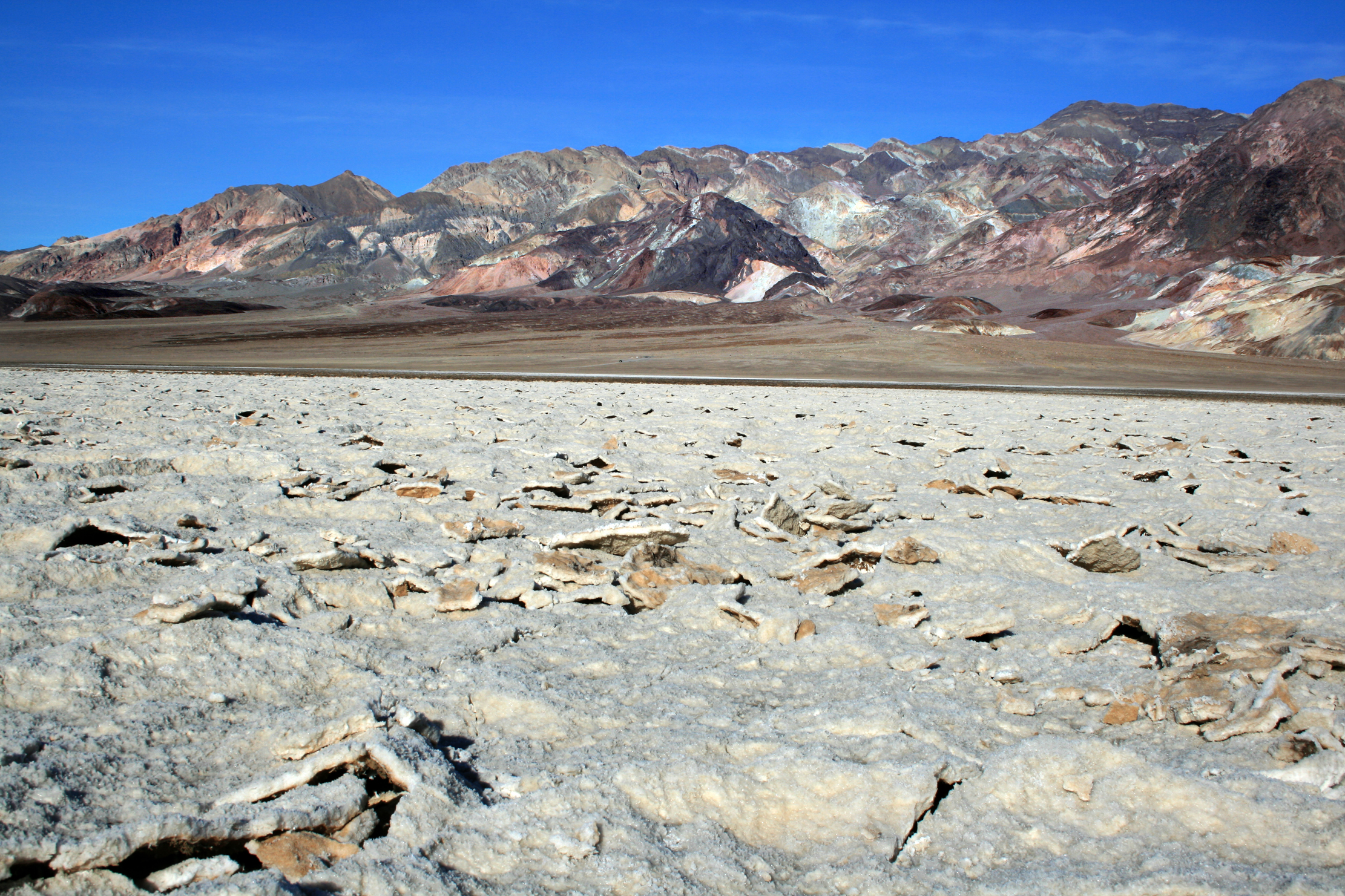
Devil's Golf Course in Death Valley National Park, western United States

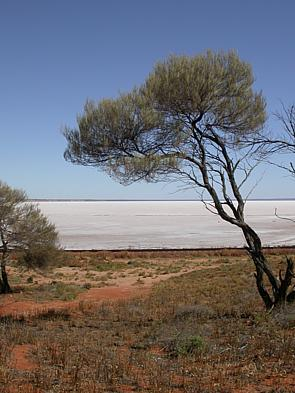
The dry lake and shore of Lake Hart, an endorheic desert lake in South Australia.

A closeup photograph of salt growths on the crust of a dry lake.

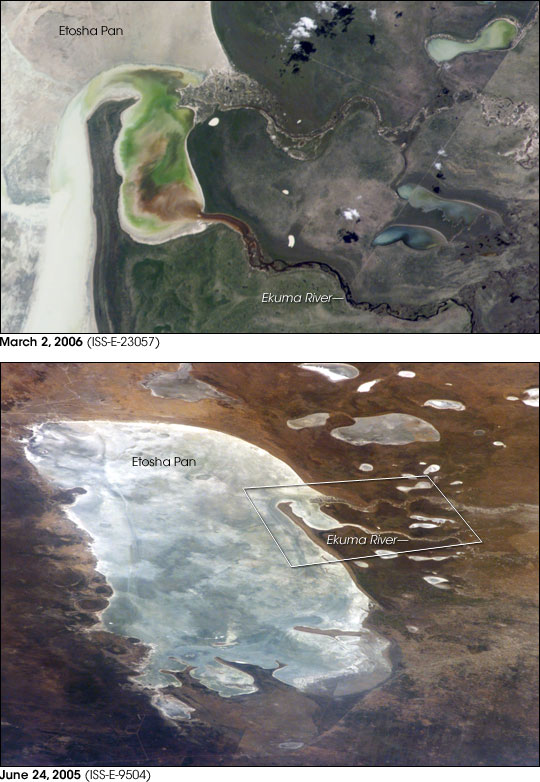
Etosha pan in northern Namibia

== See also ==
- List of drying lakes
- Lake
- Cienega – Wetland system unique to the American Southwest
- Salt storm
- Soil salinity – Salt content in the soil

== Bibliography ==
- Briere, Peter R. (May 2002). "Playa, playa lake, sabkha: Proposed definitions for old terms". Journal of Arid Environments. 45 (1). Elsevier: 1–7. doi:10.1006/jare.2000.0633.
- John H. Wellington, Southern Africa: a geographical study, Chapter 16 LAKES AND PANS
