= Salt storm =

A salt storm is a low-lying cloud of airborne salt that hovers over large areas, the result of wind sweeping over salt flats. Salt storms usually occur in places with large aboveground deposits of salt, such as those surrounding the Great Salt Lake in Utah and the Aral Sea. Salt storms are also a frequent phenomenon in the Salar de Uyuni region in Bolivia.

== Effects ==
Salt storms near the Aral Sea pose a serious health hazard to surrounding areas. Run-off from nearby farms has resulted in the pollution of the Aral Sea with toxins like pesticides and fertilizers. As the sea evaporates, the toxic pollutants in the water crystallize along with other minerals to form salt flats. When the toxins and minerals from the salt flats are blown into the air by these storms and inhaled, the toxins and minerals may cause throat and lung cancer, infant mortality, decreased life expectancy and birth defects.

Salt storms can also block visibility and cause chemical damage to surrounding structures.

== See also ==
- Aral Sea
- Salt flat
