= Racetrack Playa =

Dry lake bed in Death Valley National Park, California, United States

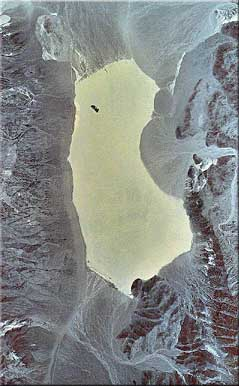

- Location within California
- Location: Death Valley National Park; Inyo County, California
- Coordinates: 36.6813°N 117.5627°W
- Lake type: Endorheic basin
- Primary outflows: Terminal (evaporation)
- Basin countries: United States
- Max. length: 4.5 km (2.8 mi)
- Max. width: 2 km (1.2 mi)
- Surface area: 7 km^{2} (2.7 sq mi)
- Shore length^{1}: 12 km (7.5 mi)
- Surface elevation: 1,132 m (3,714 ft)
- References: U.S. Geological Survey Geographic Names Information System: The Racetrack
- ^{1} Shore length is not a well-defined measure.

The Racetrack Playa, or The Racetrack, is a dry lake feature with sailing stones that inscribe linear "racetrack" imprints. It is located above the northwestern side of Death Valley, in Death Valley National Park, Inyo County, California, U.S.

== Geography ==
The Racetrack Playa is approximately 3 miles long and 1.2 miles wide and is located at a height of 3708 feet in a north–south valley east of the Panamint Range within Death Valley National Park. It receives only 3 inches of annual precipitation and is bounded on all sides by north–south ranges rising 1500 to 2000 feet. The overall drainage area is around 70 square miles, with most of it flowing onto the playa from eastern mountain rivers.

The surface of the playa, which is mainly dried clay, provides a hard, smooth, and level pavement. The distribution of stones varies, with some regions a few hundred feet from the shore having 5-10 tiny stones per square yard. There is evidence of downgrade transit in a few places.

Rocks weighing up to 320 kg travel across Racetrack Playa in northern Death Valley National Park, California, leaving tracks. This phenomenon, which has been documented since 1948, is not unique and has been observed in various playas in southern California, the Tunisian Sahara, and South Africa.

Traditionally, these rocks were considered to be pushed by wind over a wet and slippery playa surface. Recent observations from 2014 called this assumption into question. Norris et al. observed pebbles being transported as thin sheets of ice melted in 4–5 m/s winds. The ice panels moved several rocks at speeds of up to 80 mm/s.

While these discoveries give information on the physics, several aspects of the tracks remain a mystery. Kletetschka et al. proposed that when an ice sheet arises, rocks with better thermal conductivity than water or ice could become frozen to the rock's base. This permits the ice sheet to be moved together with the rock and silt by the wind.

A thorough system was put up for the investigation of Racetrack Playa's rock movement, including a weather station near the playa, time-lapse cameras centered on the southeast corner, and 15 GPS-equipped boulders on the surface. The researchers went to the location for maintenance and data retrieval 5-8 times per year. From November to March each year, the time-lapse camera recorded hourly conditions.

Interwoof GPS loggers were installed in limestone blocks northeast of natural stones and captured GPS and temperature data every 60 minutes. They began recording constantly at one-second intervals after being triggered.

The Racetrack Playa is 3,714 feet (1,132 m) above sea level, and 2.8 mi (4.5 km) long (north-south) by 1.3 mi (2.1 km) wide (east-west). The playa is exceptionally flat and level with the northern end being only 1.5 inches (3.8 cm) higher than the southern. This occurrence is due to major influx of fine-grained sediment that accumulates at the north end. The highest point surrounding the Racetrack is the 5,678-foot (1,731 m) high Ubehebe Peak, rising 1,964 feet (599 m) above the lakebed 0.85 miles (1.37 km) to the west.

The playa is in the small Racetrack Valley endorheic basin between the Cottonwood Mountains on the east and Nelson Range to the west. During periods of heavy rain, water washes down from the surrounding mountains draining into the playa, forming a shallow, short-lived endorheic lake. Under the hot desert sun, the thin veneer of water quickly evaporates leaving behind a surface layer of soft slick mud. As the mud dries, it shrinks and cracks into a mosaic pattern of interlocking polygons.

The shape of the shallow hydrocarbon lake Ontario Lacus on Saturn's moon Titan has been compared to that of Racetrack Playa.

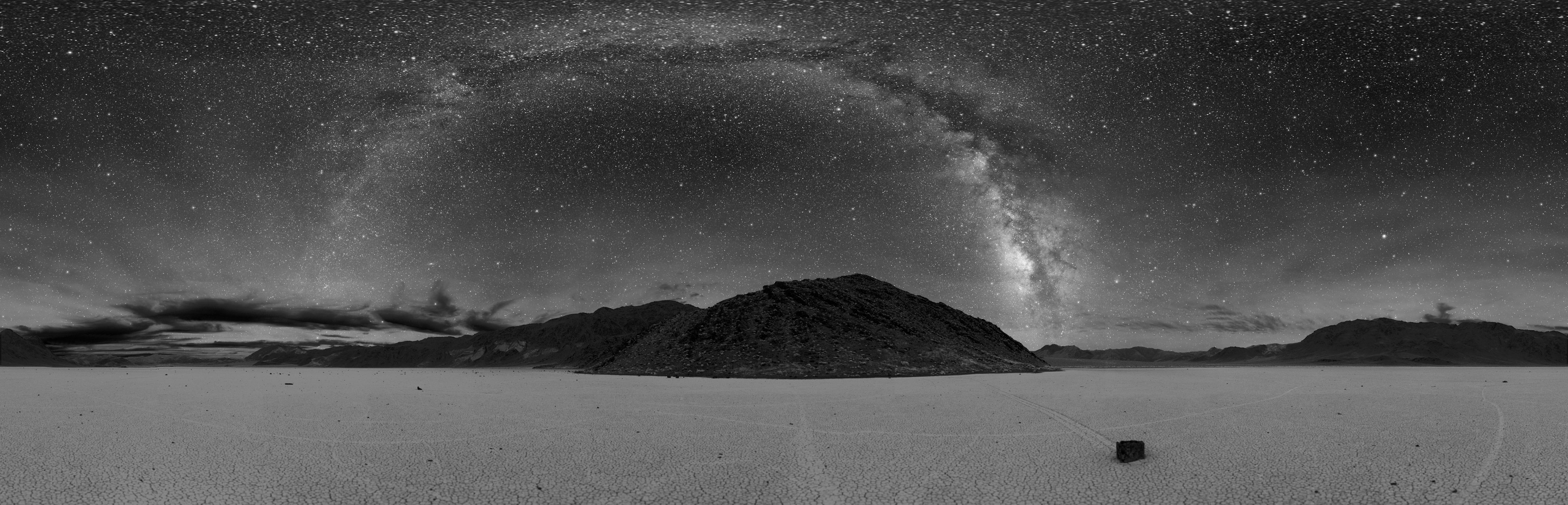
360° night-time panorama of the Racetrack Playa. The Milky Way is the visible arc in the center above a sailing stone and tracks from others.

== Features ==
Racetrack is dry for almost the entire year and has no vegetation. When dry, its surface is covered with small but firm hexagonal mud crack polygons that are typically 3 to 4 inches (7.6 to 10.2 centimetres) in diameter and about an inch (2.5 cm) thick. The polygons form in sets of three mud cracks at 120° to each other. A few days after a precipitation event, small mud curls, otherwise known as "corn flakes," form on the playa surface. Absence of these indicates that wind or another object has scraped away the tiny mud curls.

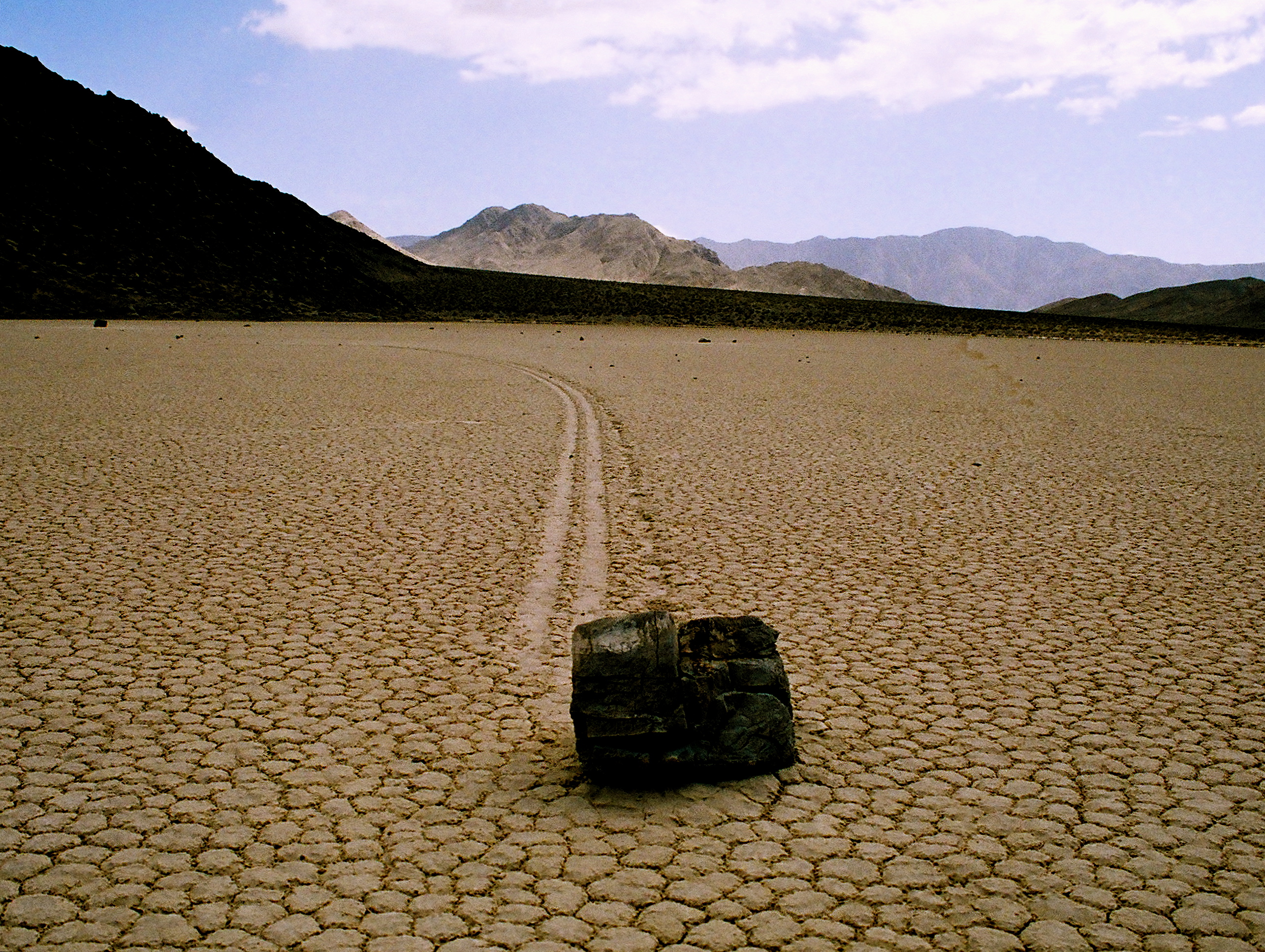
Sailing stone in Racetrack Playa

During the bimodal rainy season (summer and especially winter) a shallow cover of water deposits a thin layer of fine mud on and between the polygons of Racetrack. Heavier winter precipitation temporarily erases them until spring when the dry conditions cause new mud cracks to form in the place of the old cracks. Sandblasting wind continually helps to round the edges of exposed polygons. Annual precipitation is 3 to 4 inches (76 to 102 millimetres) and ice cover can be 1 to 2.5 inches (2.5 to 6.4 centimetres) thick. Typically only part of the playa will flood in any given year.

The Racetrack was vandalised in late 2016.

A portion of the playa's shoreline indicates ice activity, notably on the east side of the southernmost arm. A pavement of angular rock fragments and periodic alignments of bigger stones reveal little ice ramparts. Stone traces and ridges near the shore suggest ice thrusting and shearing.

Despite its thin grain, the pavement has closely matched parts that provide a mosaic-like effect. The pavement is lined with faint stone footprints, mostly to the northeast. Although modest, ice ramparts rise a few inches above the chip pavement. Ice along the beach seemed to be thrusting and shearing, with stones periodically scouring windows in the pavement.

Racetrack Playa's traits, including its low precipitation, large clay surface, and indications of ice action along the shore, add to its natural landscape.

=== Mapping ===
Detailed plots were made by nailing numbered tabs of tracing fabric to the clay along specific paths. Baselines, aligned by alidade beside paths, marked stations at 25 or 50-foot intervals. Distances were measured to the closest 0.005 feet using a 100-foot tape. Trigonometric computations were used to precisely connect the basis lines.

Rock mobility was associated with clear days following sub-freezing nights, which were caused by light breezes and the morning sun breaking up floating ice. Rocks were moved by ice disintegration, with over 60 moving in a single occurrence. Ice frequently fractured near rocks, causing wakes downstream. Some rocks went ahead of others, covering varied lengths. Ice fractures altered neighboring rocks, even those that were close together. The presence of a playa pool with precise depth parameters was a critical requirement for rock motion.

Other elements included floating ice, appropriate temperatures, sunlight, and mild winds, which were most common around midday when the ice melted. Because of their origin beneath the ice, the formation of rock trails was difficult to detect. The rocks moved slowly, lasting up to 16 minutes at speeds ranging from 2 to 5 meters per minute. During the coldest weeks, weather station data revealed freezing temperatures and winds of up to 3–5 m/s. Episodic rock motion, which can last for years or decades, has been related to occasional rain or snow episodes that build winter ponds.

=== Sailing stones ===
The sailing stones are a geological phenomenon found in the Racetrack. Slabs of dolomite and syenite ranging from a few hundred grams (few ounces) to hundreds of kilograms (pounds) inscribe visible tracks as they slide across the playa surface, without human or animal intervention. Instead, rocks move when ice sheets just a few millimeters thick start to melt during periods of light wind. These thin floating ice panels create an ice shove that moves the rocks at up to five meters (16') per minute.

An observation from the early 1970s calls the current thinking into question. During April or May 1972 or 1973, rocks up to 0.25 m in length were spotted moving purely owing to high winds on the wet playa surface. This calls into question the notion that strong winds and a water-slickened playa surface were both required for boulder movement on Racetrack Playa.

While recent observations have indicated movement by wind alone and by wind operating on small sheets of ice, many features of the phenomena, particularly those involving bigger ice sheets, still require additional investigation.

The 2017 documentary Principles of Curiosity explores as its central theme the story of the mystery of the sailing stones' movement and the resolution using the scientific method and critical thinking.

=== Islands ===
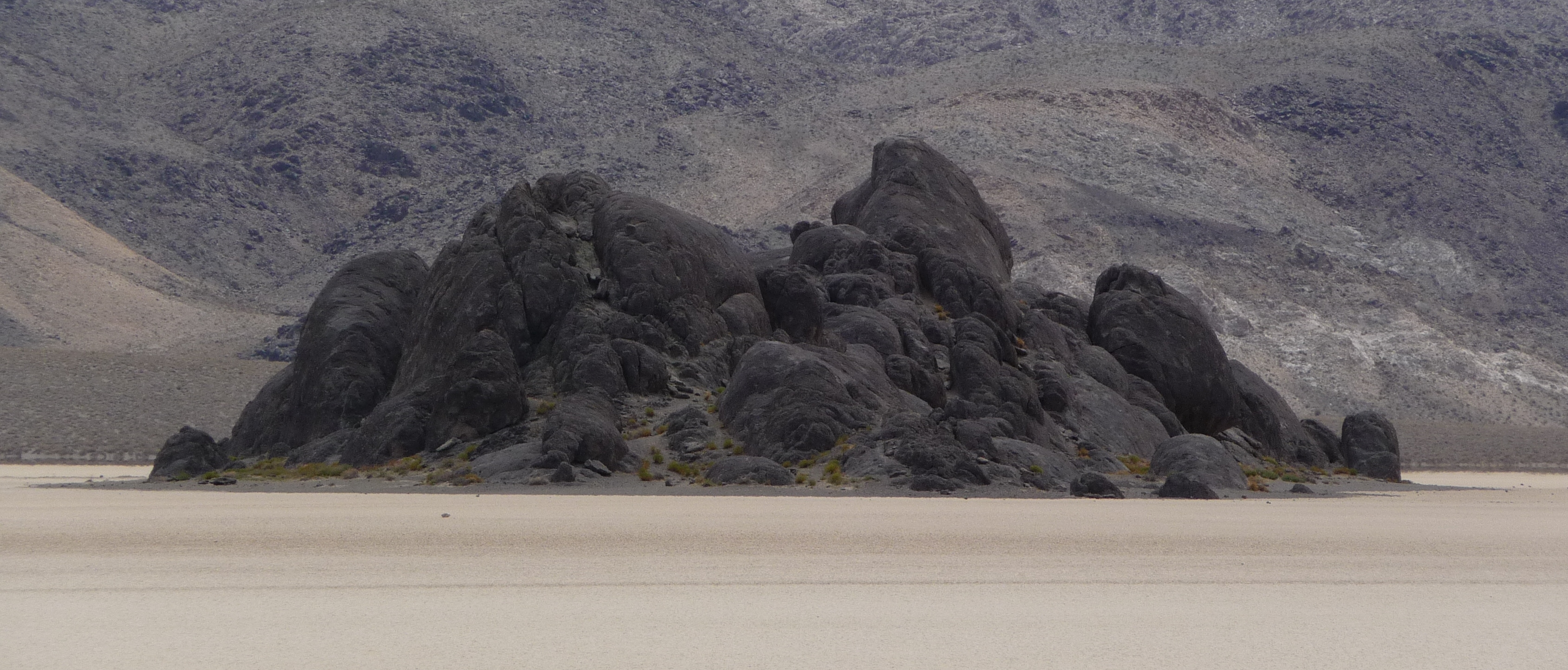
The Grandstand in the northwest area of the playa

Two islands of bedrock outcrops rise dramatically above the playa's surface at its northern end. The larger landmark is The Grandstand, a 73-foot-high (22 m) high dark quartz monzonite outcrop, rising in dramatic contrast from the bright white surface of the Racetrack. The second "island" feature is a smaller carbonate outcrop.

=== Springs ===
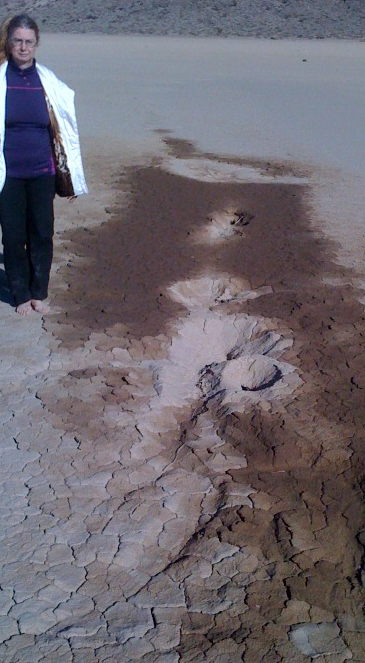
Depressions in the Racetrack playa are intermittent springs that are active at time of precipitation. Detailed view illustrate conical holes where the water comes out on the surface when this area receive excess of precipitation.

There are three areas of aligned depressions (intermittent springs) in the playa.

Spinal Springs is in the central part of the Racetrack playa. It is 550 metres (600 yards) long and starts, at its northern end, with conical depressions only a few centimeters (inches) deep. Traced southward the depressions increase to ~5 metres (16 ft) in width with scattered creosote shrubs. They then narrow and become shallower again, and finally disappear. Further north and south along this linear formation, there were several other depressions that may be a continuation of the Spinal Springs alignment.

Edge Springs is an alignment of the depressions along the southeastern edge of the Racetrack playa. The alignment parallels the toes of alluvial fans along the base of the steep mountain range.

Gindarja Springs is an alignment of depressions that consists of three large indentations aligned in a northwesterly direction within the Racetrack playa. Two are completely within the playa and the third is on the edge. All three are associated with significant vegetation.

== Visiting ==
Access is via Racetrack Road, reached at the Grapevine Junction near Scotty's Castle. The 28 mile rough gravel road heading south-west from Ubehebe Crater is passable with non-4WD vehicles but requires high ground clearance. It rounds the western side of the playa to a parking area with descriptive signs by the National Park Service. A bench here, placed by the Mano Seca Group, has scenic views of The Racetrack, The Grandstand, and mountain scenery. Another access to Racetrack Playa is Lippincott pass road that enters the Racetrack valley from the south west, climbing up from Saline Valley. Lippincott Pass and the roads in Saline Valley are extremely rough and negotiable for high clearance 4WD vehicles with all-terrain tires only. there is no mobile phone service in the Racetrack area.

Camping, while not allowed on the playa, is available in "primitive campsite" areas to the north and south. Visiting remote areas of Death Valley National Park bears considerable risk. Summer temperatures can surpass 120 °F (49 °C) in certain spots, large areas are without cellphone reception, roads are treacherous and the closest gas station is in Stovepipe Wells or in Furnace Creek (both are more than 60 miles away from Racetrack Playa).

== See also ==
- Geology of the Death Valley area
- Places of interest in the Death Valley area
