= Ubehebe Crater =

Volcanic crater in Death Valley National Park, California, US

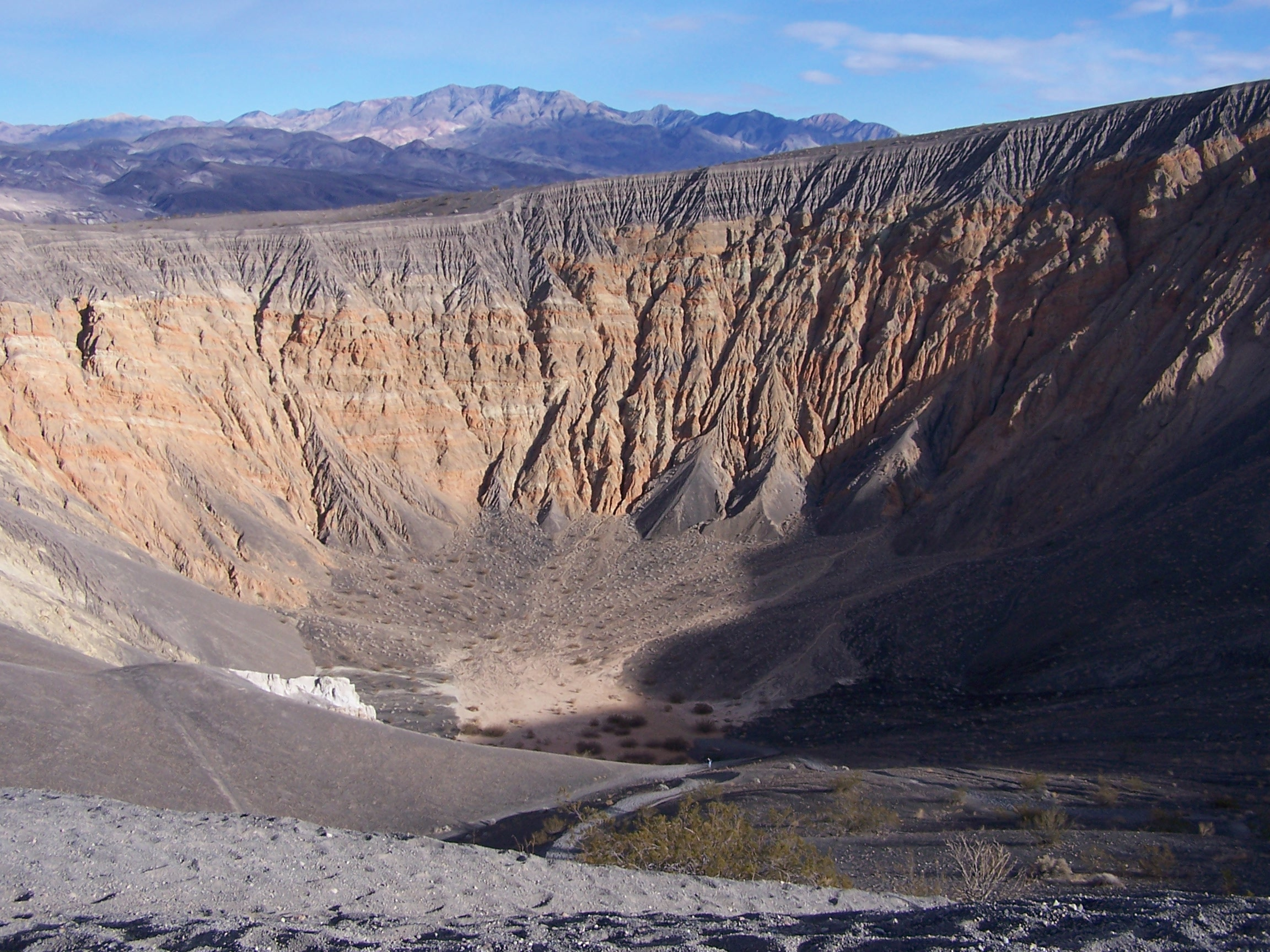
- Ubehebe Crater, 2007

- Location within California
- Location: Death Valley National Park, Inyo County, California, United States; 37°0′35″N 117°27′1″W

Impact crater structure
- Diameter: 0.5 miles (0.80 km)
- Depth: 500 to 777 feet (152 to 237 m)
- Age: 2,000-7,000 years
- Exposed: Yes
- Pronunciation: [YOO-bee-HEE-bee]

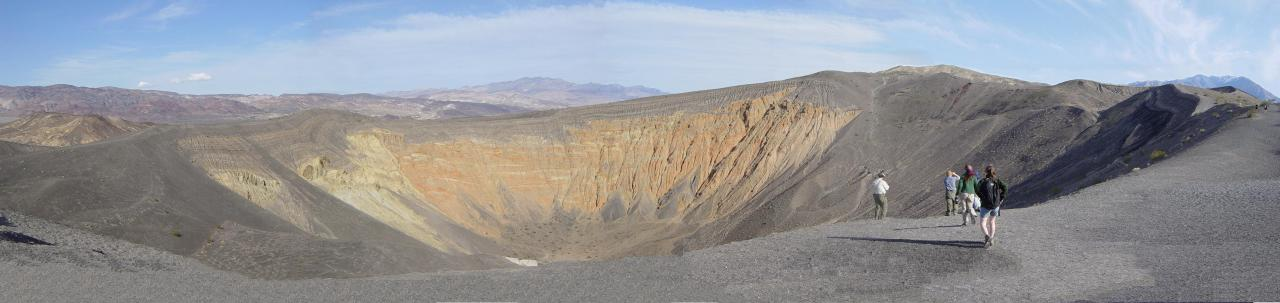
Ubehebe Crater - panoramic view

Ubehebe Crater (/jubiˈhiːbi/ yoo-bee-HEE-bee) is a large volcanic crater of the Ubehebe Craters volcanic field in the northern half of Death Valley, in Death Valley National Park, California, United States.

== Geography ==
Ubehebe Crater is located at the north tip of the Cottonwood Mountains. The crater is half a mile (one kilometer) wide and 500 to 777 feet (152 to 237 m) deep. The age of the crater is estimated from 2,000 to 7,000 years old.

In 2012, new evidence suggested that the crater may be as young as 800 years old, although this estimation was a lower bound, and it is still possible the crater is much older than that.

== Geology ==
The crater was formed when magma migrated close to the surface and the heat of the magma caused groundwater to flash into steam, throwing large quantities of pulverized old rock and new magma across the stony alluvial fan draped across the valley floor. The magma rose through a fault that lies along the western base of Tin Mountain. Movement on this fault was responsible for uplift of the entire Cottonwood Mountains range.

=== Eruptions ===
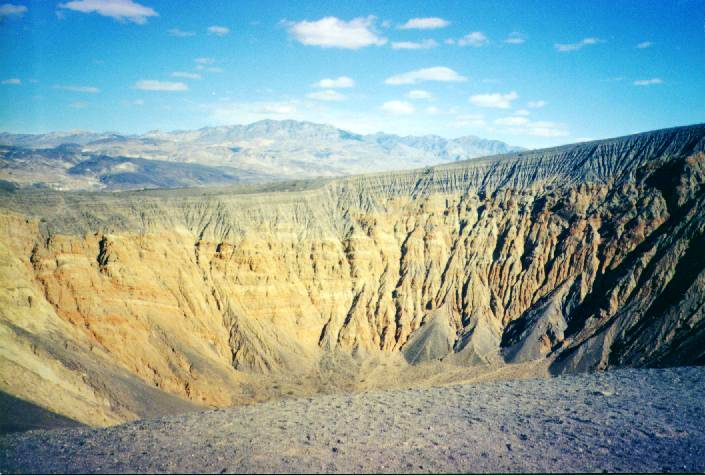
Ubehebe Crater in Springtime

Geologists call the resulting large steam explosions hydrovolcanic or phreatic eruption and the pits created are known as maars. Ubehebe was the last and largest in a series of similar eruptions in the immediate area (its eruption exceeded the tensile strength of the bedrock by 10 times). Earlier eruptions created a group of much shallower maars to the south and another to the west. Little Hebe is a spatter cone that grew in the middle of one of the largest maars in the south group. The only significant deposit of lava in the volcanic field is contained in Little Hebe.

All of the maar-forming eruptions sent out fallout debris that mantled a broad area around the volcanic field (dozens of steam explosions issued from Ubehebe alone). The resulting light to dark gray cinder deposits consist of finely fragmented volcanic rock mixed with pulverized bedrock and are thickest immediately next to Ubehebe (80 feet; 24 m). Rills and gullies that were 15-to-20-foot (4.6 to 6.1 m) deep dissected the area prior to the eruptions and were buried by the fallout. Erosion has since re-excavated these features, exposing layers of cinder that still overlay adjacent ridges.

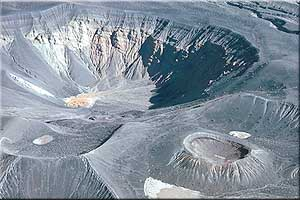
Ubehebe field from air (Peter Sanchez, NPS)

A type of pyroclastic flow called a base surge was sent out of Ubehebe by one of the explosions. It started after a large column of debris was thrown skyward then began to collapse. A doughnut-shaped cloud of hot ash and gas (the base surge) traveled at an estimated velocity of 100 to 200 mph (160 to 320 km/h) from the base of the column while staying close to the ground, plastering the Ubehebe-facing side of all objects in the area.

=== Sediments ===
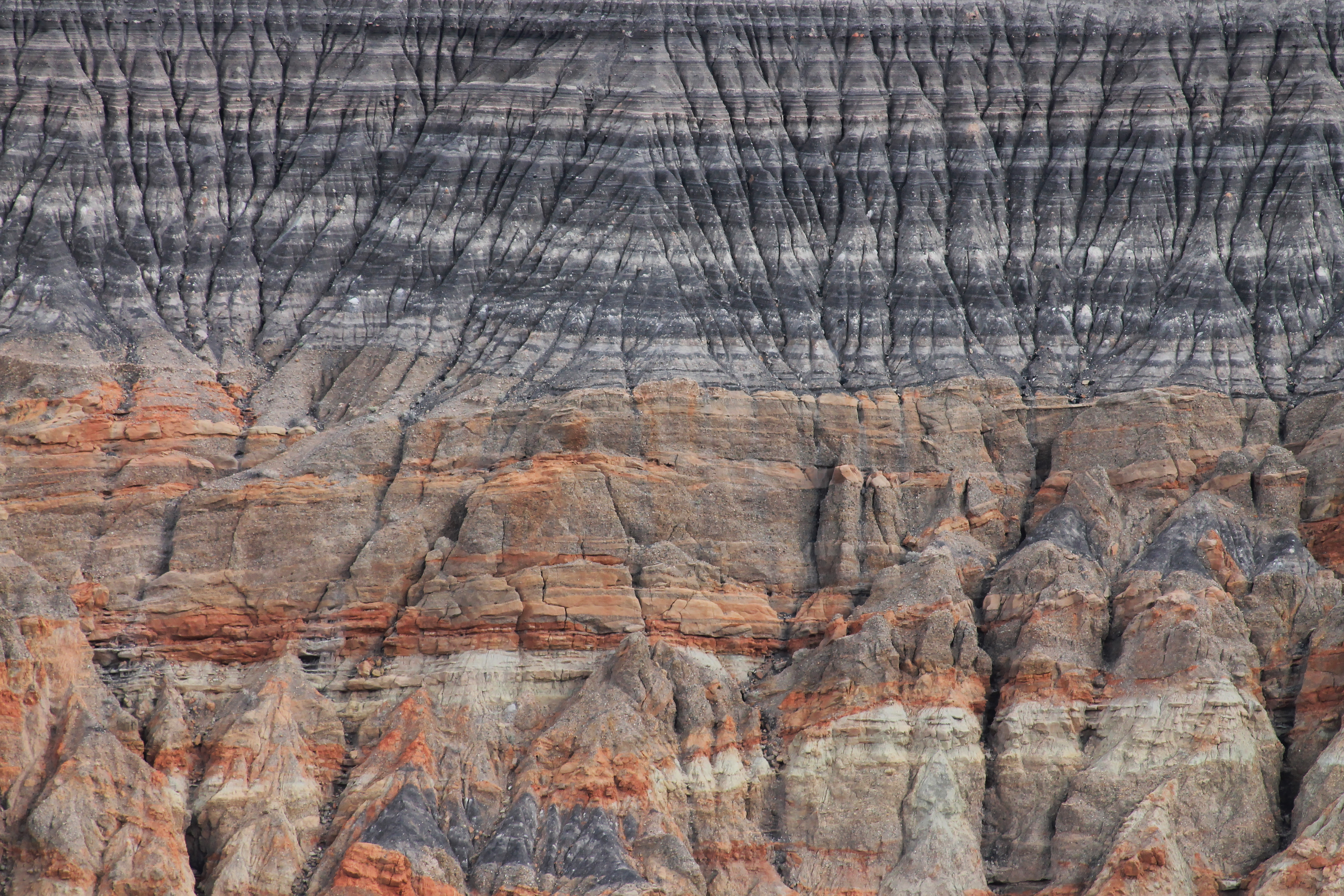
Sediment stripes on the walls of the Ubehebe crater

Reddish-orange Miocene conglomerate makes up the exposed bedrock in Ubehebe's walls. These sediments were deposited by streams and contain limestone, mudstone, quartzite and volcanic cobbles that are up to 8 inches (20 cm) in diameter. These seabed sediments are of different colors, yellowish on the left and orange on the right. The reason for the difference is that a fault separates the two sedimentary units. Over time at least 400 feet (120 m) of vertical displacement along this fault has resulted in the abutment of these two different sedimentary units. Fallout debris dip 30 feet (9.1 m) over the fault scarp on the pre-eruption surface but have not been offset by it.

Within Ubehebe small alluvial fans have been built on the crater wall along with talus slumps from debris flows. White silt covers the crater bottom of Ubehebe and some surrounding craters.

== Visiting ==
There are three major trails at the crater. One trail goes from the parking area to the bottom of Ubehebe, a second circumnavigates the crater rim, while a third trail leads off to Little Hebe.

Winds at the rim of Ubehebe are very strong and often gust above 50 mph (80 km/h). There is no restroom at the site.

== See also ==
- Geology of the Death Valley area
- Racetrack Playa
