= List of mountain ranges of California =

Coordinates: 36.5786°N 118.2920°W

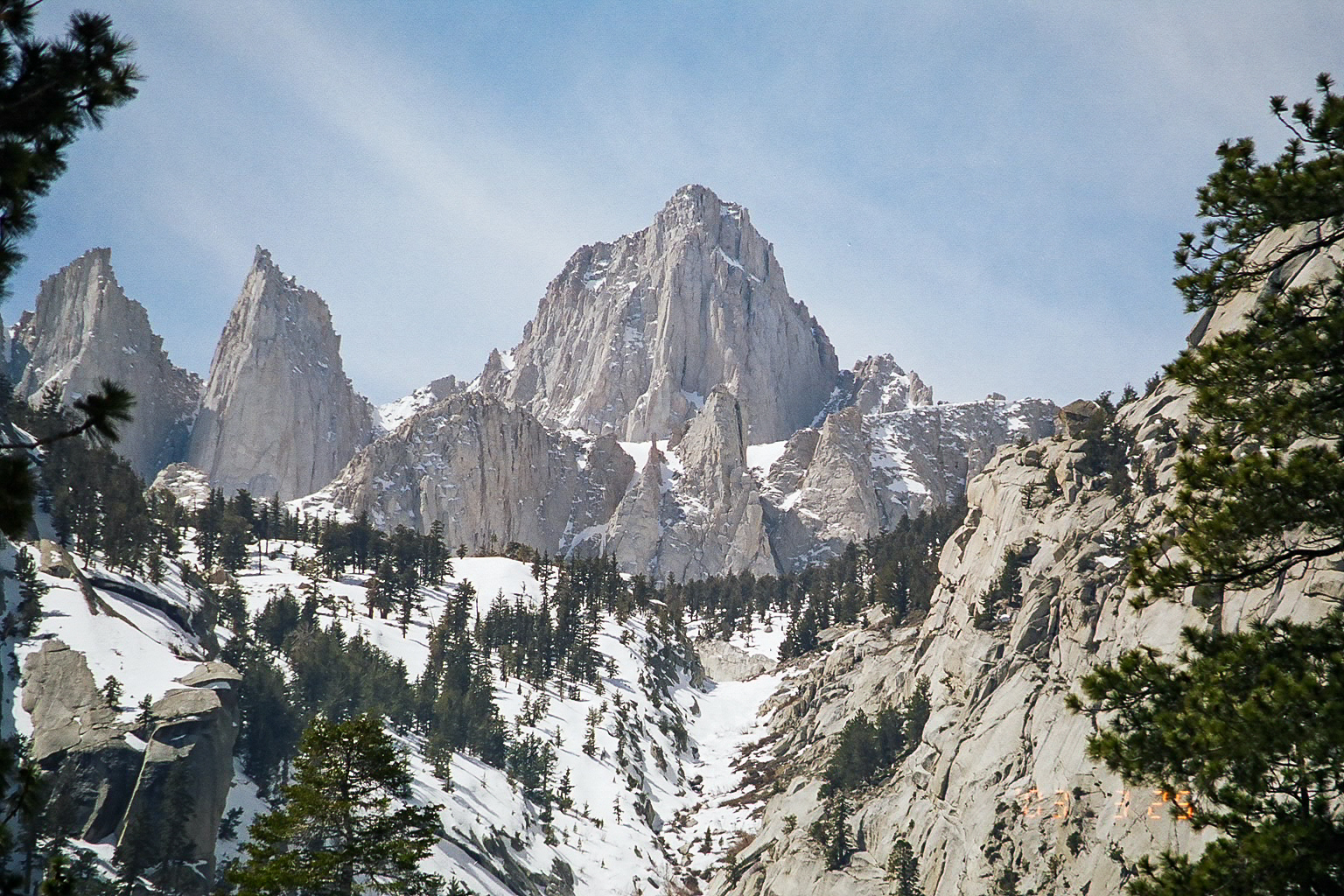
Mount Whitney is the highest mountain peak in the Sierra Nevada, the State of California, and the contiguous United States.

The following list comprises the mountain ranges of U.S. State of California designated by the United States Board on Geographic Names and cataloged in the Geographic Names Information System.

== Mountain ranges ==
- Adobe Hills
- Alabama Hills
- Alexander Hills
- Alvord Mountain
- Amargosa Range
- Amedee Mountains
- Antelope Hills
- Argus Range
- Arica Mountains
- Avawatz Mountains
- Bacon Hills
- Bald Hills (Humboldt County)
- Bald Hills (Lassen County)
- Bald Mountain Range
- Baldwin Hills
- The Balls
- Berkeley Hills
- Bernasconi Hills
- Big Blue Hills
- Big Maria Mountains
- Big Valley Mountains
- Bighorn Mountains
- Bird Hills
- Bissell Hills
- Black Hills (Contra Costa County)
- Black Hills (Imperial County)
- Black Hills (Kern County)
- Black Hills (Riverside County)
- Black Hills (San Bernardino County)
- Black Mountains
- Bodie Hills
- Bodie Mountains
- Box Springs Mountains
- Brawley Peaks
- Briones Hills
- Bristol Mountains
- Buena Vista Hills (Kern County)
- Buena Vista Hills (San Diego County)
- Bullion Mountains
- Burnt Hills
- Cady Mountains
- Calico Mountains
- Calico Peaks
- Caliente Range
- Call Mountains
- Calumet Mountains
- Campbell Hills
- Capay Hills
- Cargo Muchacho Mountains
- Carson Range
- Cascade Range
- Casmalia Hills
- Castle Mountains
- Cathedral Range
- Chalk Buttes
- Chalk Hills
- Chalk Mountains
- Chemehuevi Mountains
- Chino Hills
- Chocolate Mountains
- Cholame Hills
- Chowchilla Mountains
- Chuckwalla Mountains
- Ciervo Hills
- Clark Mountain Range
- Clark Range
- Clear Lake Hills
- Clipper Mountains
- Coast Ranges
- Colton Hills
- Confidence Hills
- Coppersmith Hills
- Coso Range
- Cottonwood Mountains (Inyo County)
- Cottonwood Mountains (Lassen County)
- Cottonwood Mountains (Riverside County)
- Coxcomb Mountains
- Coyote Hills (Alameda County)
- Coyote Hills (Plumas County)
- Coyote Mountains
- Crafton Hills
- Crystal Hills
- Crystal Range
- Cuyamaca Mountains
- Darwin Hills
- Deadman Hills
- Dead Mountains
- Devils Hole Hills
- Diablo Range
- Diamond Mountains
- Domenigoni Mountains
- Dominguez Hills
- Dougherty Hills
- Dublin Hills
- Dumont Hills
- Dunnigan Hills
- Eagle Hills
- Eagle Mountains
- East Coyote Hills
- Elk Hills
- Elk Range
- Elkhorn Hills
- El Paso Mountains
- English Hills
- Fenner Hills
- Fish Creek Mountains
- Fletcher Hills
- Flynn Hills
- Fort Sage Mountains
- Four Brothers
- Fry Mountains
- Funeral Mountains
- Gabilan Range
- Granite Mountains (eastern San Bernardino County, California)
- Granite Mountains (northern San Bernardino County, California)
- Granite Mountains (western San Bernardino County, California)
- Granite Mountains (Riverside County, California)
- Grapevine Hills
- Grapevine Mountains
- Gravel Hills
- Gravel Range
- Greenhorn Mountains
- Greenwater Range
- Griswold Hills
- Guijarral Hills
- Hemme Hills
- Hexie Mountains
- Hoodoo Hills
- Horned Toad Hills
- Horse Hills
- Horse Range
- Ibex Hills
- Indio Hills
- In-Ko-Pah Mountains
- Inyo Mountains
- Irish Hills
- Iron Mountains
- Ivanpah Mountains
- Jacalitos Hills
- Jacumba Mountains
- Jamul Mountains
- Jurupa Mountains
- Kalmia Hills
- Kelsey Range
- Kelso Mountains
- Kettleman Hills
- Kilbeck Hills
- Kilgore Hills
- King Range
- Kingston Range
- Kit Fox Hills
- Klamath Mountains
- Kramer Hills
- Kreyenhagen Hills
- La Loma Hills
- La Panza Range
- Laguna Mountains
- Lakeview Mountains
- Larkspur Hills
- Las Aguilas Mountains
- Las Alturas
- Las Colinas
- Las Lomas
- Last Chance Range
- Lava Bed Mountains
- Lava Mountains
- Little Chuckwalla Mountains
- Little Maria Mountains
- Little Mule Mountains
- Little Piute Mountains
- Little San Bernardino Mountains
- Little Signal Hills
- Lompoc Hills
- Long Buttes
- Los Buellis Hills
- Los Jinetes
- Los Viejos
- Lost Hills
- Marble Mountains (San Bernardino County)
- Marble Mountains (Siskiyou County)
- Mayacamas Mountains
- McCoy Mountains
- Mecca Hills
- Merriam Mountains
- Mescal Range
- Mesquite Hills
- Mesquite Mountains
- Mid Hills
- Middle Hills
- Mineral Range
- Mitchel Range
- Montezuma Hills
- Mopah Range
- Mount Buchon
- Mud Hills
- Mule Mountains
- Nelson Range
- New Range
- New York Mountains
- Newberry Mountains
- North Pinyon Mountains
- Oat Hills (Colusa County)
- Oat Hills (Mariposa County)
- Oat Hills (San Diego County)
- Oat Hills (Yuba County)
- Ogilby Hills
- Old Dad Mountains
- Old Woman Mountains
- Ord Mountains (northeast of Apple Valley)
- Ord Mountains (south of Apple Valley, California)
- Orocopia Mountains
- Owlshead Mountains
- Palen Mountains
- Palo Verde Mountains
- Palos Verdes Hills
- Panamint Range
- Panhandle Hills
- Panoche Hills
- Panorama Hills
- Paradise Range
- Partlett Mountains
- Pedley Hills
- Peralta Hills
- Pine Hills
- Pinto Mountains
- Pinyon Mountains
- Piute Mountains
- Piute Range
- Pleito Hills
- Point of Rocks (Kern County)
- Point of Rocks (San Bernardino County)
- Potrero Hills (Richmond)
- Poverty Hills
- Providence Mountains
- Puente Hills
- Pyramid Hills
- Quail Mountains
- Rand Mountains
- Rawson Mountains
- Red Hills (San Luis Obispo County)
- Red Hills (Tuolumne County)
- Resting Spring Range
- Ritter Range
- Riverside Mountains
- Rodman Mountains
- Rosamond Hills
- Rosecrans Hills
- Sacramento Mountains
- Saddle Peak Hills
- Sagehen Hills
- Saline Range
- Salmon Mountains
- Salt Spring Hills
- San Bernardino Mountains
- San Emigdio Mountains
- San Felipe Hills (Santa Clara County)
- San Felipe Hills (San Diego County)
- San Gabriel Mountains
- San Jacinto Mountains
- San Joaquin Hills
- San Jose Hills
- San Leandro Hills
- San Marcos Mountains
- San Rafael Hills
- San Rafael Mountains
- San Ysidro Mountains
- Sand Hills
- Santa Ana Mountains
- Santa Cruz Mountains
- Santa Lucia Range
- Santa Margarita Mountains
- Santa Monica Mountains
- Santa Rosa Hills (Inyo County)
- Santa Rosa Hills (Riverside County)
- Santa Rosa Mountains
- Santa Susana Mountains
- Santa Teresa Hills
- Santa Ynez Mountains
- Sawtooth Mountains
- Sawtooth Range (San Bernardino County)
- Sawtooth Range (San Diego County)
- Scodie Mountains
- Scott Bar Mountains
- Scott Mountains
- Shadow Mountains
- Shale Hills
- Shandin Hills
- Sheep Hills
- Sheep Hole Mountains
- Shelton Buttes
- Sherburne Hills
- Ship Mountains
- Sierra Azul
- Sierra de Salinas
- Sierra Madre Mountains
- Sierra Nevada
- Sierra Pelona Mountains
- Silurian Hills
- Simi Hills
- Siskiyou Mountains
- Skedaddle Mountains
- Slate Range
- Soda Mountains
- Solomon Hills
- Sonoma Mountains
- South Hills
- Spangler Hills
- Sperry Hills
- Stepladder Mountains
- Summit Range
- Superstition Hills
- Sweetwater Mountains
- Sweitzer Hills
- Sylvania Mountains
- Talc City Hills
- Tecopa Hills
- Tehachapi Mountains
- Tejon Hills
- Telephone Hills
- Temblor Range
- Tent Hills
- The Badlands
- The Girdle
- The Palisades
- Three Sisters (Siskiyou County)
- Three Sisters (Riverside County)
- Three Sisters (Los Angeles County)
- Tierra Blanca Mountains
- Topatopa Mountains
- Trainer Hills
- Trinity Alps
- Trinity Mountains
- Tucalota Hills
- Tumey Hills
- Turtle Mountains
- Twin Peaks
- Vaca Mountains
- Valjean Hills
- Vallecito Mountains
- Venice Hills
- Verdi Range
- Verdugo Mountains
- Volcan Mountains
- Volcanic Hills
- Vontrigger Hills
- Warner Mountains
- Waterman Hills
- West Coyote Hills
- West Riverside Mountains
- Whipple Mountains
- White Hills (Inyo County)
- White Hills (Santa Barbara County)
- White Mountains
- Whitehorse Mountains
- Widow Valley Mountains
- Woods Mountains
- Yountville Hills
- Yuha Buttes

== See also ==
- List of mountain peaks of North America
  - List of mountain peaks of Greenland
  - List of mountain peaks of Canada
  - List of mountain peaks of the Rocky Mountains
  - List of mountain peaks of the United States
    - List of mountain peaks of Alaska
    - List of mountain peaks of California
      - List of the major 4000-meter summits of California
      - List of the major 3000-meter summits of California
      - List of California fourteeners
      - List of mountain ranges of California
    - List of mountain peaks of Colorado
    - List of mountain peaks of Hawaiʻi
  - List of mountain peaks of México
  - List of mountain peaks of Central America
  - List of mountain peaks of the Caribbean
- California
  - Geography of California
    - Category:Mountains of California
      - commons:Category:Mountains of California
- Physical geography
  - Topography
    - Topographic elevation
    - Topographic prominence
    - Topographic isolation
