= Three Sisters =

Three Sisters may refer to:

== Geography ==
=== Australia ===
- Three Sisters (Australia), a rock formation near Katoomba, New South Wales
- The Three Sisters (Queensland), three islands
- Three Sisters Island (Tasmania), three small islands

=== Canada ===
- The Three Sisters (Alberta), three peaks in the Canadian Rockies near Canmore, Alberta
- The Three Sisters (Lake Huron), three islands in Lake Huron
- The Three Sisters (Temagami), three lakes in Temagami, Ontario
- Three Sisters (Elk Valley), three peaks in the Canadian Rockies just north of the town of Fernie, British Columbia
- Three Sisters Range, three peaks in the Stikine Country, British Columbia
- Three Sisters Lakes Provincial Park, a park near Hixon, British Columbia
- Three Sisters, a rock formation along the shore of Cape Chignecto Provincial Park

=== Ireland ===
- The Three Sisters (Ireland), three rivers
- An Triúr Deirféar (Irish for The Three Sisters), three peaks on the Dingle Peninsula

=== United Kingdom ===
- Three Sisters (Glen Coe), three ridges
- Three Sisters Circuit, a motor racing circuit near Wigan
- Three Sisters Recreation Area, Wigan

=== United States ===
- Three Sisters, spires in Monument Valley, Arizona
- Three Sisters, mineral springs at Lake Ouachita State Park, Arkansas
- Three Sisters (Los Angeles County), a mountain range in California
- Three Sisters (Riverside County), a mountain range in California
- Three Sisters (Siskiyou County), a mountain range in California
- Three Sisters (District of Columbia), three islands
- Three Sisters Springs (Florida)
- Three Sisters (Georgia), three peaks
- Three Sisters (Oregon), three volcanoes
- Three Sisters Wilderness, Oregon
- Three Sisters (Pittsburgh), three bridges in Pennsylvania
- Three Sisters (District of Columbia), three islands in the Potomac River
- Three Sisters Islands (New York)

=== Elsewhere ===
- Olu Malau Islands or Three Sisters Islands, Solomon Islands
- Three Sisters (Northern Cape), South Africa, a rock formation consisting of three conical peaks

== Stage, film and television ==
- Three Sisters (play), a play by Anton Chekhov
  - The Three Sisters (1966 film), an American film
  - Three Sisters (1970 film), a British film directed by Laurence Olivier
  - The Three Sisters (1970 film), a British television adaptation
  - Three Sisters (1988 film), aka Love and Fear, directed by Margarethe von Trotta
  - Three Sisters (1994 film), a Russian film adaptation
  - Three Sisters (opera), a 1998 opera by Péter Eötvös
- The Three Sisters (fairy tale), an Italian fairy tale
- The Three Sisters (1930 film), an American film directed by Paul Sloane
- Three Sisters (musical), a 1934 musical by Jerome Kern and Oscar Hammerstein II
- Three Sisters (1934 film), a Chinese film of the 1930s
- Three Sisters (2012 film), a Chinese documentary film
- Three Sisters (2020 film) a South Korean film
- The Three Sisters (2024 film), a short film by Konstantin Bronsit
- Three Sisters (American TV series), a 2001–2002 American TV series starring Dyan Cannon, Katherine LaNasa, and David Alan Basche
- Three Sisters (South Korean TV series), a 2010 South Korean television drama
- "The Three Sisters" (Knots Landing), a 1982 television episode

== Other uses ==
- Three Sisters (album), a 2004 album by Alice Donut
- Three Sisters (agriculture), a Native American agricultural technique for planting maize (corn), beans, and squash close together for shared benefits
- Three Sisters (sternwheeler), a steamboat
- Three Sisters tomato, a variety of tomato
- Three Sisters Bridge, a cancelled bridge over the Potomac River in Washington, D.C.
- Three Sisters Tavern, a restaurant in Portland, Oregon
- Three Sisters of Nauset, a trio of lighthouses in Nauset, Massachusetts
- Three sisters, a name for a combination of rogue waves, particularly on Lake Superior
- "The Three Sisters", a colloquial phrase for the Dutch Reformed Church in South Africa (NGK), Dutch Reformed Church in South Africa (NHK), and Reformed Churches in South Africa
- Orion's Belt, also known as the Three Sisters, a part of the constellation Orion

== See also ==
- Drei Schwestern
- Tri Sestry
- Tři sestry (Czech band)
- The Triplets bridges
