= Oat Hills =

Oat Hills may refer to one of the following places in the US state of California:

- Oat Hills (Colusa County)
- Oat Hills (Mariposa County)
- Oat Hills (San Diego County)
- Oat Hills (Yuba County)
