= San Felipe Hills =

San Felipe Hills may refer to:

- San Felipe Hills (Santa Clara County), California, USA
- San Felipe Hills (San Diego County), California, USA

== See also ==
- List of mountain ranges of California
