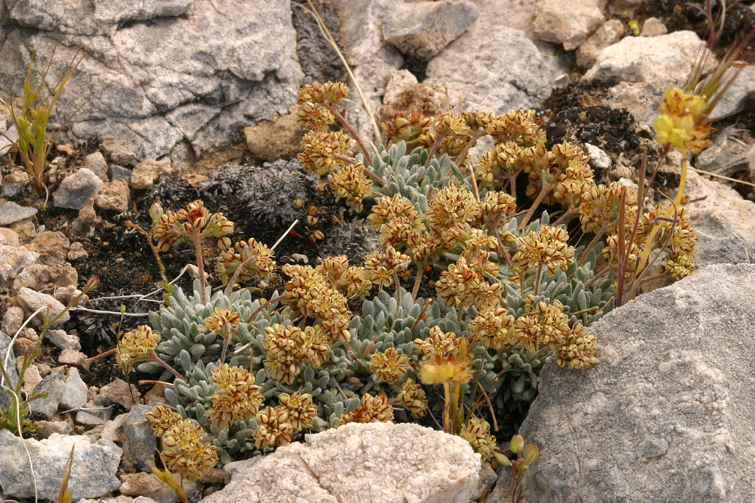

Scientific classification
- Kingdom: Plantae
- Clade: Tracheophytes
- Clade: Angiosperms
- Clade: Eudicots
- Order: Caryophyllales
- Family: Polygonaceae
- Genus: Eriogonum
- Species: E. gilmanii

Binomial name
- Eriogonum gilmanii S.Stokes

= Eriogonum gilmanii =

Species of wild buckwheat

Eriogonum gilmanii is a species of wild buckwheat known by the common name Gilman's buckwheat. This plant is endemic to Inyo County, California, where it is known only from the desert mountain slopes of the Cottonwood, Last Chance, and Panamint Ranges. This is a flat mat-forming, woody perennial herb which grows in patches under 20 centimeters wide on rocky soils. Its tiny fleshy leaves, each under half a centimeter wide, are covered in a dense hairy white wool. The plant blooms in showy erect heads of small, inflated flowers, each a few millimeters wide and yellowish or orange with red stripes.
