= Panorama (disambiguation) =

A panorama is a visual image display format in art or photography.

Panorama or panoramic may also refer to:

== Arts and entertainment ==
- Moving panorama, a theatrical device using a long panoramic painting wound on a scroll
- Panorama (art)
- Panoramic painting, a type of large artwork
- Panoramic photography

=== Publications ===
- Panorama (Albania), an Albanian newspaper
- Panorama (Gibraltar), a Gibraltar newspaper
- Panorama (per masthead, officially Diario Panorama), a Venezuelan newspaper
- Panorama (magazine), an Italian magazine
- Panorama, the first (1925) magazine in the List of works by Kwee Tek Hoay#Magazines
- Panorama (Russian satirical website), a Russian news satire.

=== Film and television ===
- Panorama (British TV programme), a current affairs programme on BBC television
- Panorama (German news series), consisting of four programs aired in 1944
- Panorama (German TV program), aired since 1961
- Panorama (Polish TV program), a Polish news program on TVP2
- RelieF, formerly Panorama, a Canadian TV series
- Panorama, a section of the Berlin International Film Festival dedicated to queer cinema

=== Music ===
- Panorama (music competition), an annual steelband competition held in Trinidad and Tobago
- National Panorama Competition (UK), an annual steelband competition held in the United Kingdom

==== Albums ====
- Panorama (6cyclemind album), 2005
- Panorama (Braintax album), 2006
- Panorama (The Cars album) or the title song (see below), 1980
- Panorama (Hayley Kiyoko album), or the title track, 2022
- Panorama (La Dispute album), 2019
- Panorama: Live at the Village Vanguard, by Jim Hall, 1997
- Panoramic (album), by 32 Leaves, 2007
- Panorama, by Åsmund Åmli Band, 2008
- Panorama, by Cosmic Rough Riders, 2000
- Panorama, by Kim Ho-joong, 2022
- Panorama, by Møme, 2016
- Panorama, by Silkie, 2021

==== Songs ====
- "Panorama" (The Cars song), 1980
- "Panorama" (Nana Mizuki song), 2004
- "Panorama" (Iz*One song), 2020
- "Panorama" (Taeyeon song), 2025
- "Panorama", by Phoebe Bridgers from Lost Weekend, 2026

== Computing ==
- Panorama (database engine)
- Panorama (typesetting software), a text composition engine
- Panorama Tools, open source panorama creation and viewing software

== Organizations ==
- Panorama Airways, an airline based in Uzbekistan
- Panorama Antennas, a British antenna manufacturer
- Panorama Records, possibly an early name for Profile Records
- Panorama Software, a Canadian business-intelligence software company
- Panorama Studios, an Indian film production and distribution company

== Places ==
=== United States ===
- Panorama City, Los Angeles, California
- Panorama Park, Iowa
- Panorama Village, Texas
- Panorama (Montross, Virginia)

=== Canada ===
- Panorama Mountain Resort, near Invermere, British Columbia
- Panorama Lounge, former name of The One Eighty, in Toronto

=== Elsewhere ===
- Panorama, original non-Finnish name for Panoraama, a gyro tower amusement park attraction in Helsinki, Finland
- Panorama, Parow a suburb in South Africa
- Panorama, São Paulo, Brazil
- Panorama, South Australia, a suburb of Adelaide
- Panorama, Thessaloniki, Greece

== Other uses ==
- Carnival Panorama, a cruise ship
- Fiat Panorama, a station wagon
- Freedom of panorama (Panoramafreiheit), a provision in the copyright law that allows taking pictures of public places
- Panorama, the placement of a monaural signal on a stereo bus in panning (audio)
- Panorama (Semmering ski course), a women's technical ski course and traditional World Cup venue in Semmering, Austria

== See also ==
- Mount Panorama Circuit, a motor racing circuit in Bathurst, New South Wales, Australia
- Panorama Hills (disambiguation)
- Panoramic (restaurant), a restaurant in Liverpool, England
- Panoramio, a geolocation-oriented photo sharing website
