= Buena Vista Hills =

Buena Vista Hills may refer to:

- Buena Vista Hills (Kern County) in California, USA
- Buena Vista Hills (San Diego County) in California, USA
- Buena Vista Hills (Nevada) in Nevada, USA
