= Crystal Peak =

Crystal Peak may refer to:

Geography

- Crystal Peak (Alaska) in Alaska
- Crystal Peak (Arizona) in Arizona
- Crystal Peak (Inyo County, California) in California
- Crystal Peak (Lassen County, California) in California
- Crystal Peak (Mendocino County, California) in California
- Crystal Peak (Santa Clara County, California) in California
- Crystal Peak (Sierra County, California) in California
- Crystal Peak (Gunnison County, Colorado) (2 peaks by this name) in Colorado
- Crystal Peak (Hinsdale County, Colorado) in Colorado
- Crystal Peak (Summit County, Colorado) in Colorado
- Crystal Peak (Teller County, Colorado) in Colorado
- Crystal Peak (Tenmile Range) in Colorado
- Crystal Peak (Idaho) in Idaho
- Crystal Peak (Montana) in Montana
- Crystal Peak (Pakistan), Karakoram range
- Crystal Peak (Box Elder County, Utah) in Utah
- Crystal Peak (Millard County, Utah) in Utah
- Crystal Peak (Olympic Mountains) in Washington
- Crystal Peak (Washington) in Washington
- Crystal Peak (Wyoming) in Wyoming

Fiction

- Crystal Peak (Terminator), a fallout shelter in the film Terminator 3: Rise of the Machines
- An area in the video game Hollow Knight

== See also ==
- Crystal Palace is sometimes mistakenly called 'Crystal Peak' - see Cheyenne Mountain NORAD base
