= Cottonwood Mountains =

Cottonwood Mountains may refer to:

- Cottonwood Mountains (Arizona), Arizona, USA
- Cottonwood Mountains (Inyo County), California, USA
- Cottonwood Mountains (Lassen County), California, USA
- Cottonwood Mountains (Riverside County), California, USA
