= Sandhills =

Sandhills or Sand Hills may refer to:

- Sandhill
- Sandhill cranes

== Canada ==
- Sand Hills, Ontario, near Houghton Centre, Ontario, on Lake Erie

== United Kingdom ==
- Sandhills, Oxfordshire
- Sandhills, Surrey
- Sandhills, West Midlands
- Sandhills area of Southern Leighton Buzzard, Bedfordshire
- Sandhills, a hamlet on the ouskirts of Cattistock, Dorset
- Sandhills railway station in Liverpool

== United States ==
- Sand Hills (California), Yuba County, California
- Carolina Sandhills, a region in North Carolina, South Carolina, and Georgia
  - Sand Hills cottage architecture
- Sand Hills (Florida), Bay County, Florida
- Sand Hills in Sheridan County, Montana
- Sandhills (Nebraska), a region in north-central Nebraska
  - Sand Hills Golf Club, a country club in Mullen, Nebraska, within that state's Sandhills region
- Sandhills Publishing Company in Lincoln, Nebraska
- Sand Hills (Nevada), Washoe County, Nevada
- Sand Hills, Edison and Woodbridge, New Jersey
- Sand Hills, South Brunswick, New Jersey
- Sand Hills, Oklahoma
- Sand Hills (Oregon), Harney County, Oregon
- Monahans Sandhills State Park, Monahans, Texas
- Sand Hills (Utah), a set of hills in the Little Sahara Recreation Area
- Sand Hill Road, arterial route in Silicon Valley and home to many key venture capital firms
