= Girdle (disambiguation) =

A girdle is a garment that encircles the midsection.

Girdle may also refer to:

- Girdle (undergarment), form-fitting foundation garment often worn to shape or for support
- Girdle of Thomas, a belt dropped by the Virgin Mary to the Apostle Thomas
- Cincture, a liturgical vestment
- Girdle book, small medieval European books able to be hung from the belt
- The Girdle, a mountain range in California
- Girdle Toll, a small village on the outskirts of Irvine, North Ayrshire
- Pelvic girdle, an anatomical term
- Pectoral girdle, an anatomical term
- Girdle pain, pain that encircles the body like a belt
- Girdle (chiton), part of the anatomy of the marine mollusks known as chitons
- Girdle (gastropod), a raised spiral line or band on the shell's surface
- Girdle (gemstone), element of round gemstone cuts
- Girdle moths, moths in the genus Enypia

== See also ==
- Gartel
- Girdling, the removal of a ring of tree bark
- Griddle, a cooking pan or plate, known in Scotland as a girdle
