= Saline Range =

Mountain range in Inyo County, California

- Location within California

Highest point
- Elevation: 1,999 m (6,558 ft)

Geography
- Country: United States
- State: California
- District: Inyo County
- Range coordinates: 37°0′50.756″N 117°47′16.291″W
- Topo map: USGS East of Waucoba Spring

The Saline Range is a mountain range in Inyo County, California, within Death Valley National Park.

== Geography ==
The Saline Range is to the northwest of Death Valley and frames the eastern side of the Saline Valley. The Inyo Mountains form the western side. To the east is the Last Chance Range, and to the south the Nelson Range.

== See also ==
- Mountain ranges of the Mojave Desert
- Protected areas of the Mojave Desert
