= Pleito =

Pleito may refer to:

- Pleyto, California
- Pleito Hills, in California
