= Kitfox =

Kitfox or kit fox may refer to:

- Kit fox, a North American mammal species
- Kitfox Games, a Canadian computer games developer
- Kit Fox Hills, a mountain range in California, United States
- Denney Kitfox, an American kit-built aircraft design
