= Coyoteville, Nevada County, California =

Coyoteville
- Former settlement
- Location in California
- Coordinates: 39°33′05″N 120°41′20″W
- Country: United States
- State: California
- County: Nevada County
- Elevation: 2,160 ft (660 m)

Coyoteville is a former settlement located in Nevada County, California. It is situated at an elevation of 2,160 ft (660 m) above sea level.

== History ==
The town of Coyoteville started on the eastern section of Lost Hill, an area rich with gold in gravel hills. During the California Gold Rush, a tunneling method called "coyoteing" was developed here, giving the town its name.

In later years, Coyoteville became the northwestern portion of Nevada City, California.
