= Nelson Range =

Mountain range in British Columbia, Canada

Coordinates: 49°17′00″N 116°58′00″W

The Nelson Range is a subrange of the Selkirk Mountains in the West Kootenay region of British Columbia, Canada. It is located south of the west arm of Kootenay Lake between the Salmo (W) and Kootenay Rivers (E) and also to the west of the south arm of Kootenay Lake. The range gets its name from the City of Nelson, which is on the south bank of the West Arm of Kootenay Lake and at the foot of the range's northwestern slopes.

The range-designation ends at the Canada–United States border. In the United States, the term Nelson Range refers to a different range in Inyo County, California.
