= Burnt Hill =

Burnt Hill may refer to:

- Burnt Hill, Berkshire, a town in England
- Burnt Hill, New Zealand, a town in the Waimakariri District
- Burnt Hill (Delaware County, New York), a mountain

== See also ==
- Burnt Hills, a mountain range in Santa Clara County, California
- Burnt Hills, New York, a hamlet
