= Forest Home Farms =

- U.S. National Register of Historic Places
- U.S. Historic district
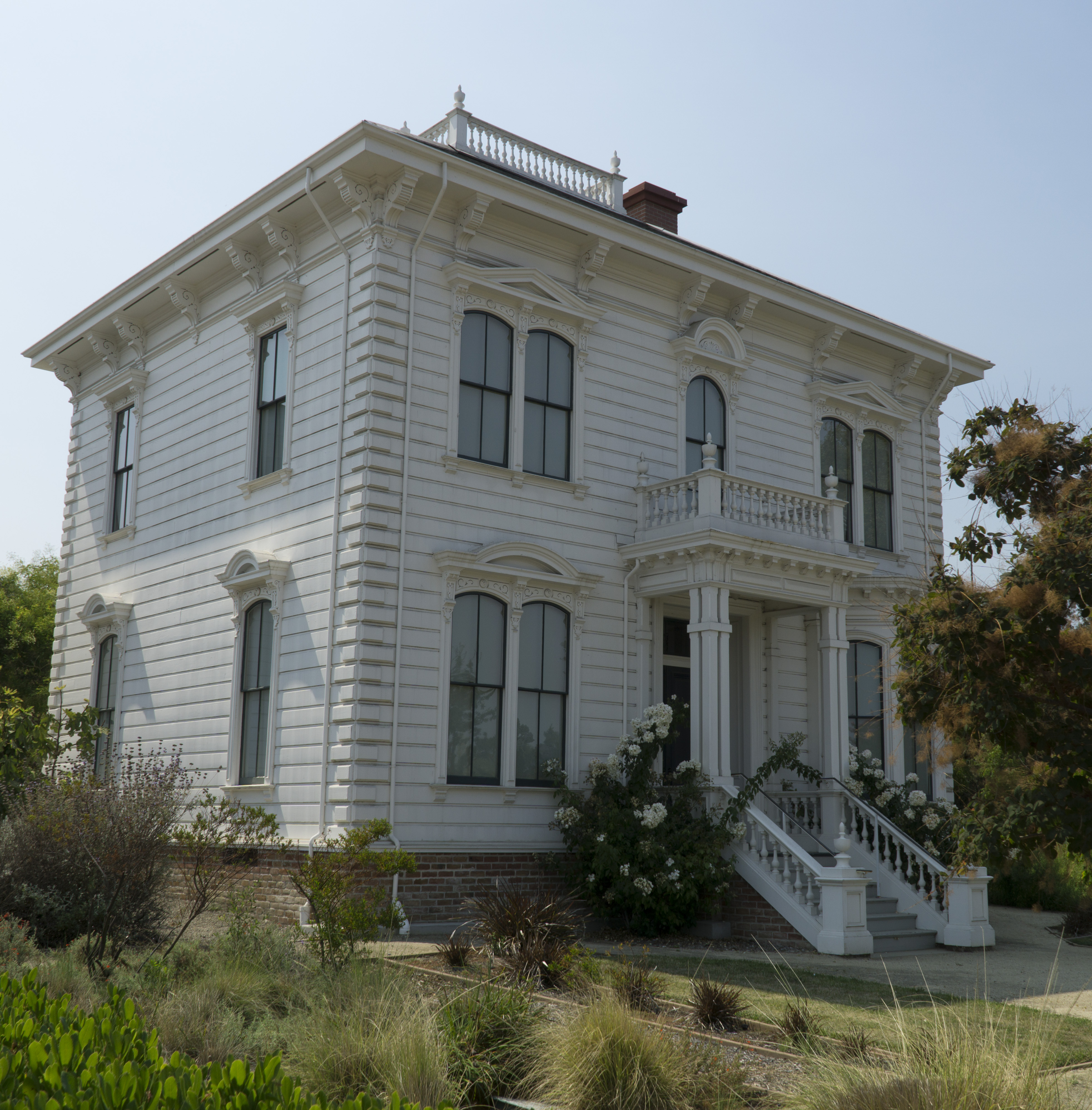
- The David Glass House

- Location within California Location within the United States
- Location: 19953 San Ramon Valley Blvd., San Ramon, California
- Coordinates: 37°44′6″N 121°57′0″W
- Built: 1850
- Architects: Rider & Connor
- Architectural style: Colonial, Italianate
- NRHP reference No.: 02000677
- Added to NRHP: June 28, 2002

The Forest Home Farms is a 16-acre (6.5-hectare) municipal historic park located in San Ramon, California. In 1997, Ruth Quayle Boone bequeathed the land and all buildings on it to the City of San Ramon for use as a park and historical site in memory of her husband, Travis Moore Boone. After Ruth Boone's death in 1998 at the age of 94, the City expanded the memorial to include Ruth, in honor of her generosity to the people of San Ramon and in recognition of the contribution women made to agriculture in the San Ramon Valley.

== History ==
The 16-acre (6.5 ha) farm is located at the base of the Dougherty Hills, and Oak Creek divides it in two almost equal parts. The northern portion of the site contains all of the structures built or used by the Boones, except for the cistern, which sits atop a hill on the southwest corner of the property. The structures include two houses, 14 outbuildings and two pergolas. The houses represent almost a century of residential development in the valley. The Boone House is a 22-room Dutch colonial that was remodeled several times since it was built in 1900. This home now serves as office space, meeting space, and hosts recreation programs as scheduled by staff. The 14 outbuildings, which vary significantly in date of construction and size, include a barn originally built in the period from 1850 to 1860, a 7,000-square-foot (650-square-meter) farm equipment and automobile storage structure and a three-building walnut processing plant that includes a three-story hulling and drying structure.

The southern portion of the property is now home to the David Glass House, a Victorian style structure dating to the late 1860s to early 1870s. This home was relocated from its original site at Lora Nita Farm. The Glass House is a two-story, wood-frame dwelling with a one-story rear wing, which may be older than the main body of the house. The tankhouse, somewhat modified from historic condition, is a two-story, wood-frame structure that is probably slightly later in date than the house. The Glass House exterior will soon be restored to its original condition. Following that part of the project, the landscaping around the home will be reworked to resemble a photo of the home from 1890s. The photo shows a windmill behind the home and the windmill from the Henry Farm will be placed there to best recreate the way the Glass House is depicted in the photo.

== Current events ==
Forest Home Farms Historic Park is open to the public Monday through Friday from 10:00 am to 4:00 pm. A self-guided tour is available via the Otocast app. The park also runs two award-winning educational programs: Farm Life Education and Victorian Life Education. Both programs were developed to meet the standards of the third-grade curriculum, but have been adapted to host grades two through five. Beginning October 2020, the Farm Life Education Program was made available in a virtual format so teachers and students could still enjoy the content in their virtual classrooms during COVID-19 related restrictions. The historic park also hosts a myriad of group tours and free Saturday programs during non-restricted times.

== Future plans ==
The scope of work for this project is quite large and projects are completed on an ongoing basis as they are incorporated into the city's capital improvement plan (CIP). Since opening as a historic park, the David Glass House has been restored and turned into a historic home museum and the original 1850s barn has been refurbished and used as a new interpretive space within the educational program. Ongoing maintenance seeks to preserve the local history, and various projects have been identified to enhance the longevity of the existing structures.

== See also ==
- National Register of Historic Places listings in Contra Costa County, California
