= Last Chance Mountain =

Mountain in Inyo County, California, United States

Coordinates: 37°17′20.43″N 117°42′17.61″W

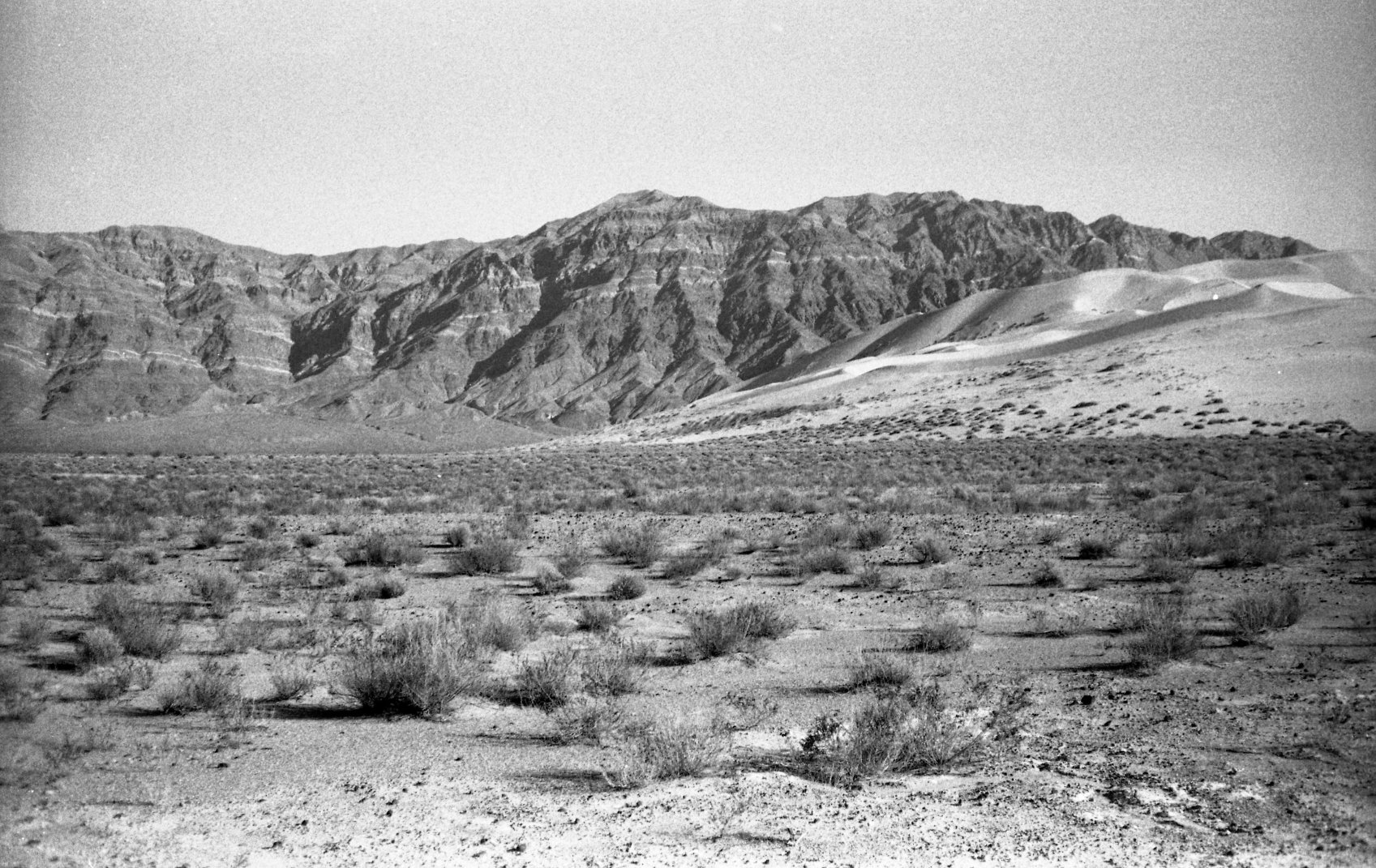
- The Eureka Dunes, where the trail to the mountain starts.

Highest point
- Elevation: 8,440 ft (2,570 m)

Geography
- Location: 37° 17' 20.43" N, 117° 42' 17.61" W
- Parent range: Last Chance Range

Geology
- Mountain type: Cone

Last Chance Mountain is a mountain in the Last Chance Range, California. It is 8,440 feet (2,570 m) tall, and the 12th tallest mountain in the range. It is located entirely within Death Valley National Park.

== Geography ==
The mountain is around 8,440 feet (2,570 m) tall at its tallest peak. It located inside of the Last Chance Range, and is the 12th tallest mountain in the range. The mountain is also located entirely in the Death Valley National Park. The mountain is accessible by a 23.1 mile trail.

The mountain is located near the Hanging Rock Cannon and Big Pine road. It is also the last high peak in the range.

== See also ==
- Last chance range
- List of mountains of the United States
