= Four Brothers =

Four Brothers may refer to:

- Four Brothers (Cascade Range) in Washington state, U.S.
- Four Brothers (mountain range) in Del Norte County, California, U.S.
- "Four Brothers" (jazz standard), composed by Jimmy Giuffre
- Four Brothers (film), a 2005 film directed by John Singleton
- Four Brothers (band), Zimbabwean Jit band
- The Four Brothers Band, a jazz big band organized in 1947 by Woody Herman
- Lung Kong Tin Yee Association, an ethnic Chinese fraternity also known as the Four Brothers
- Quatre frères, a French ship

== See also ==
- The Brothers Four, an American folk singing group
