= Sweitzer =

Sweitzer may refer to:

- Sweitzer (surname)
- 4194 Sweitzer, a main-belt asteroid
- Sweitzer Hills, in northern Yolo County, California
- Sweitzer Lake State Park, a Colorado State Park
