= Antenna Products Corporation =

- Company type: Public
- Industry: Radio equipment
- Founded: 1947; 79 years ago
- Headquarters: Mineral Wells, Texas, United States
- Area served: Worldwide
- Products: Antennas for aviation, military and commercial use
- Number of employees: 51 (2025)
- Subsidiaries: Antenna Products Corp, Phazar Antenna Corp (PAC), and Thirco, Inc
- Website: antennaproducts.com

Antenna Products Corporation (APC) is an American communication equipment manufacturer and distributor that provides products worldwide. Its products include antennas, tower, masts and relevant communication equipment. Its subsidiary, Antenna Products Corp, is a manufacturer with ISO 9001:2008 certification.

== History ==
In 2013, the company merged with QAR Industries, Inc. and Antenna Products Acquisition Corp.

== Structure ==
The company is a holding company with subsidiaries including Antenna Products Corp.(APC), Phazar Antenna Corp (PAC) and Thirco, Inc.. APC is also a communication equipment supplier offering antenna, towers and masts worldwide. PAC operates as a division of APC and Thirco is an equipment leasing company.

== See also ==
- Panorama Antennas
