= Little Piute Mountains =

Mountain range in California, United States

- Location within California

Highest point
- Elevation: 874 m (2,867 ft)

Geography
- Country: United States
- State: California
- District: San Bernardino County
- Range coordinates: 34°38′38.010″N 115°2′58.904″W
- Topo map: USGS Little Piute Mountains

The Little Piute Mountains are a mountain range in San Bernardino County, California. They are northeast of the Old Woman Mountains, northwest of the Stepladder Mountains, and southeast of the Piute Mountains in the Mojave Trails National Monument.
