= White Top Mountain (California) =

Mountain in California, United States

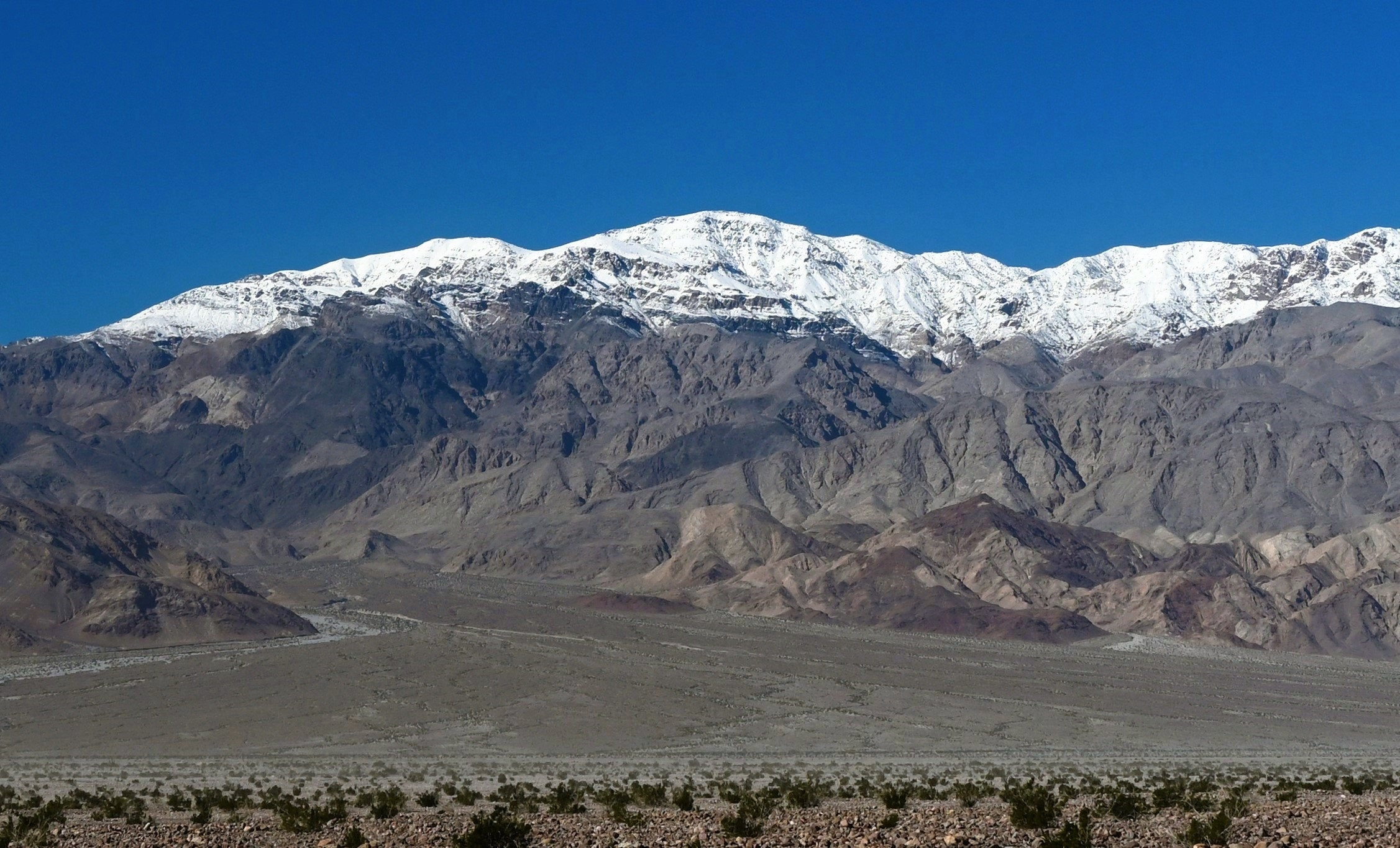
- East aspect

Highest point
- Elevation: 7,607 ft (2,319 m)
- Prominence: 687 ft (209 m)
- Parent peak: Peak 8261
- Isolation: 2.5 mi (4.0 km)
- Coordinates: 36°46′48″N 117°24′46″W

Geography
- Location within California Location within the United States
- Country: United States
- State: California
- County: Inyo
- Protected area: Death Valley National Park
- Parent range: Panamint Range; Cottonwood Mountains
- Topo map: USGS White Top Mountain

Geology
- Rock age: Ordovician
- Mountain type: Fault block
- Rock type: Sedimentary rock

White Top Mountain is a 7,607-foot-elevation (2,319-meter) summit in Inyo County, California, United States.

== Description ==
White Top Mountain is part of the Cottonwood Mountains which are the northern extension of the Panamint Range. It is set within Death Valley National Park and the Mojave Desert. Precipitation runoff from this landform drains to Death Valley via Dry Bone Canyon. Topographic relief is significant as the summit rises 7,100 feet (2,164 meters) above the valley floor in 7.5 miles (12.1 km). The mountain is composed of Ordovician limestone, a marine sedimentary rock. This mountain's toponym has been officially adopted by the United States Board on Geographic Names.

== Climate ==
According to the Köppen climate classification system, White Top Mountain has a cold desert climate, with the lower valleys in a hot desert climate zone. Temperatures average between 0 °F to 30 °F in January, and 50 °F to 100 °F in July. Typical of high deserts, summer temperatures can be exceedingly hot, while winter temperatures can be very cold. Snowfall is common, but the snow melts rapidly in the arid and sunny climate. Rainfall is very low, and the evaporation rate classifies the area as desert.

== See also ==
- Geology of the Death Valley area
- Mountains of Death Valley National Park
