= Crystal Peak (Lassen County, California) =

Mountain in California, United States

Crystal Peak (Lassen)
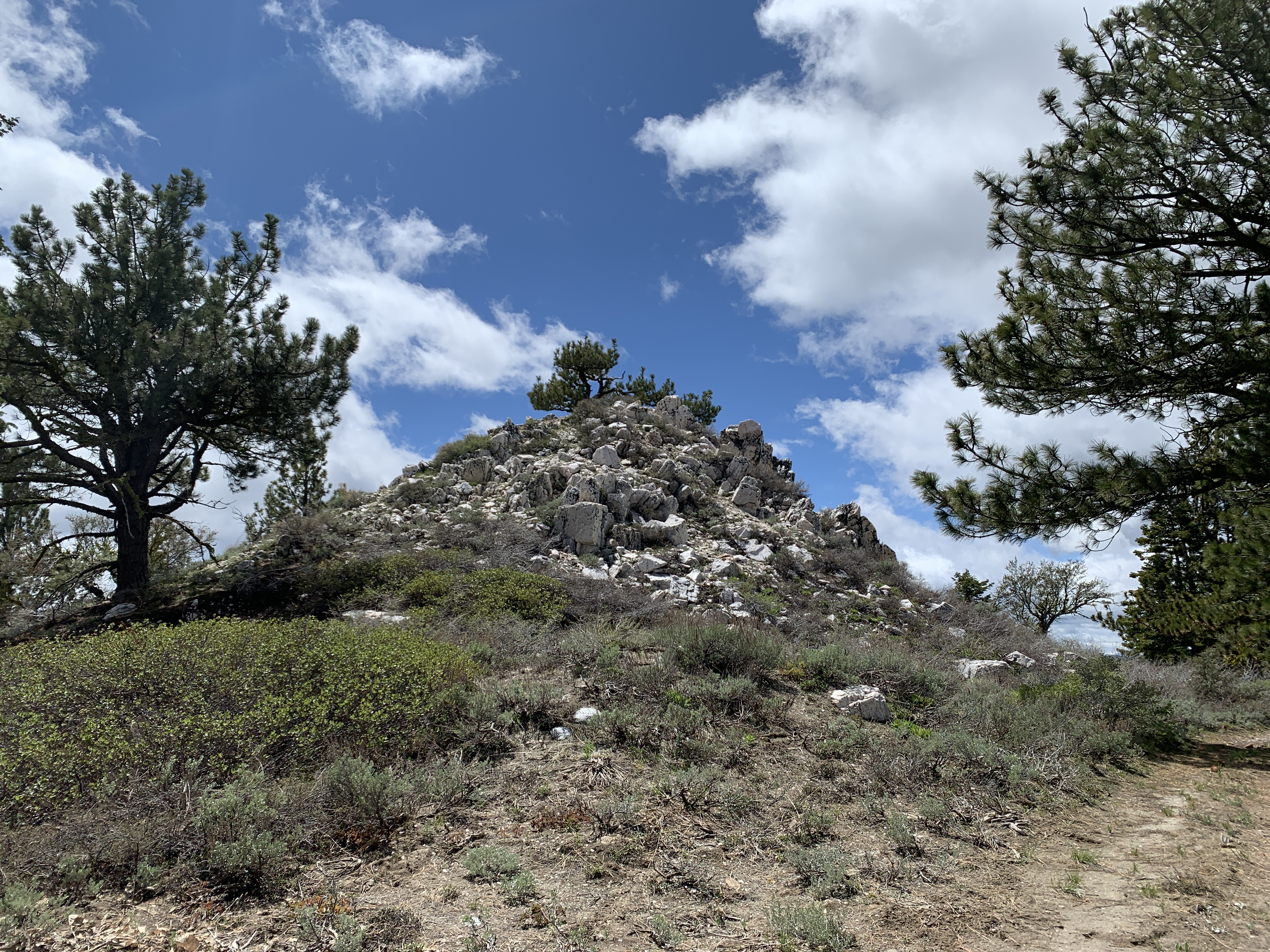

Highest point
- Elevation: 8,107 ft (2,471 m)
- Coordinates: 39°56′31.79″N 120°07′31.15″W

Geography
- Location within California
- Location: Lassen County, California
- Parent range: Diamond Mountains, Lassen County

Crystal Peak is a mountain on the border of Lassen and Plumas Counties, California, in the middle of the northern Sierra Nevada Diamond Mountains, just a short 36 miles (as the crow flies) from its "sister" mountain of the same name in neighboring Sierra County. The mountain gets its name from its unusual summit block, which is apparently made out of solid quartz. The block rises about forty feet above the flat summit.

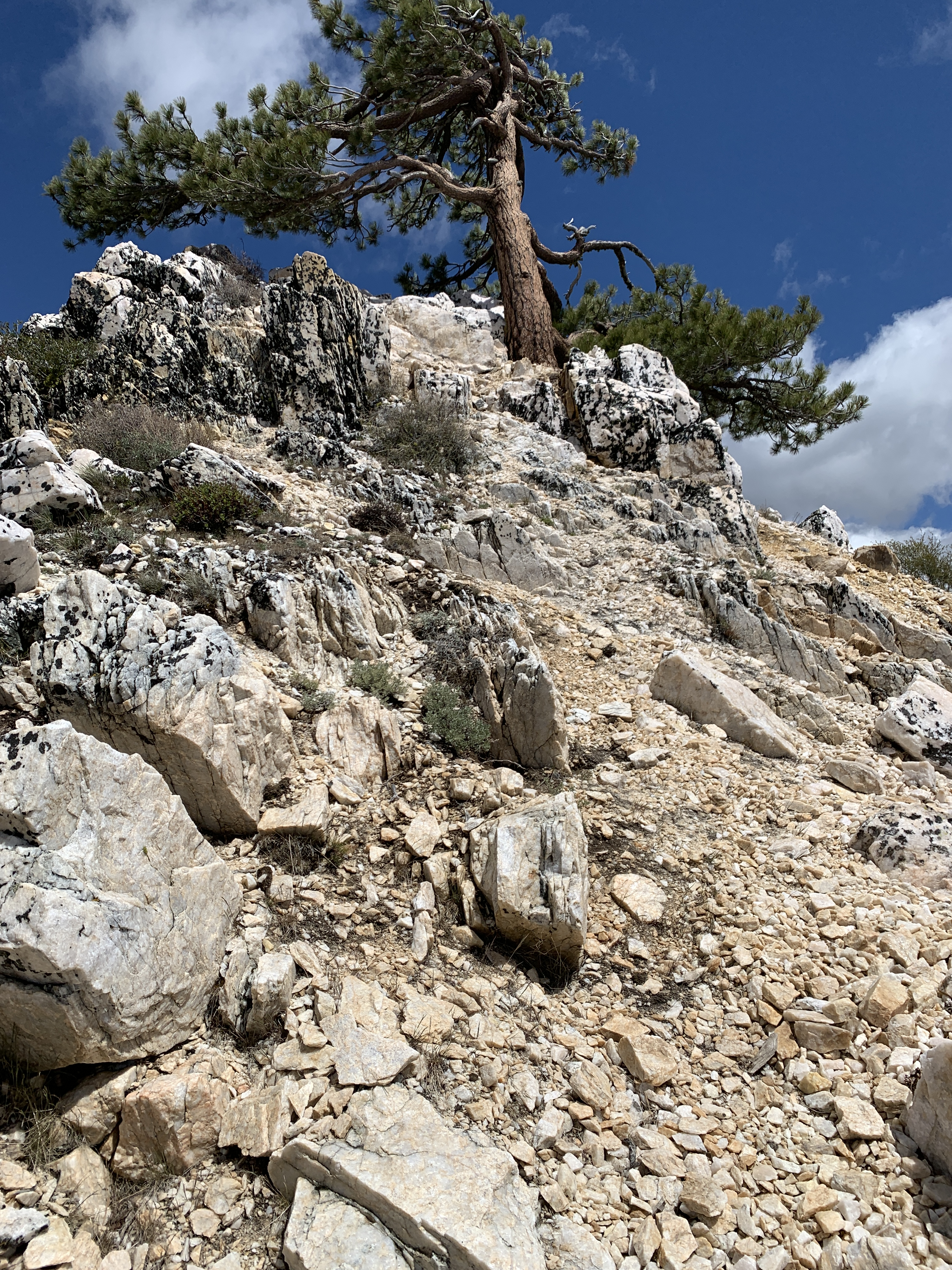
Withered quartz block exposed at the top of Crystal Peak
