= Thomas Bones =

American land developer

Thomas Bones (1842–1929) was a farmer and land developer who owned and developed property in Madison, New York, Hillsboro, Wisconsin, and Rochester, Minnesota, as well as farmland in the Rosecrans area near Inglewood, California.

He was born in Sussex, England, on November 1, 1842, the son of Thomas of Sussex and Mary Buss of Kent. He had ten siblings, including Mary, Thomas, William, Ellen, George and Edward (who later lived in Los Angeles), Arthur and Anna. Two siblings died when young. Thomas was brought by his parents to Madison County, New York.

Bones was married in or near Rochester, Minnesota, to Martha C. Murdock. They had one son, Henry Harvey. In 1874-75, because of the wife's ill health, the family moved to San Mateo County, where he was in the lumber business.

Bones died on April 9, 1929, in the family home at 1319 North Fairfax Avenue in today's West Hollywood neighborhood. Burial was in Angelus-Rosedale Cemetery, Los Angeles.
