= Panorama Hills =

Panorama Hills may refer to:

- Panorama Hills, Calgary, Canada, a suburban residential neighbourhood
- Panorama Hills, Illinois, US, an unincorporated community
- Panorama Hills (California), US, a mountain range
