= Trainer Hills =

- Location within California Location within the United States

Highest point
- Elevation: 44 m (144 ft)

Geography
- Country: United States
- State: California
- District: Yuba County
- Range coordinates: 39°14′35.607″N 121°29′38.876″W
- Topo map: USGS Browns Valley

The Trainer Hills are a low mountain range of the eastern Sacramento Valley, located in Yuba County, California.
