= Peralta Hills =

Ridge of hills in California

- Location within California Location within the United States

Highest point
- Elevation: 351 m (1,152 ft)

Geography
- Country: United States
- State: California
- District: Orange County
- Range coordinates: 33°49′55.058″N 117°46′47.198″W
- Topo map: USGS Orange

The Peralta Hills are a ridge of hills in northeastern Orange County, California.

The ridge technically begins with Burruel Point (685 feet) in the city of Orange, close to where Nohl Ranch Road meets the Costa Mesa Freeway (SR 55), although there are hills to the west of Burruel Point, extending into the vast alluvial plain of the Los Angeles Basin to the community of Olive, California, ending roughly at the intersection of Orange-Olive Road and Lincoln Avenue.

The ridge gains in elevation eastward, with peaks of 500 to 1,000 feet, until it meets the Santa Ana Mountains along the eastern boundaries of the city of Anaheim, roughly at the Eastern Transportation Corridor (SR 241). The hills are divided from the Puente Hills (home to the community of Yorba Linda to the north) by the Santa Ana River.

Robbers Peak (between Serrano Avenue and Weir Canyon) is the most notable peak within the Peralta Hills, and Weir Canyon the most notable canyon.

== See also ==
- Category: Hills of California
- Category: Peninsular Ranges
- Category: Geography of Orange County, California
