= Bissell Hills =

- Location within California

Highest point
- Elevation: 818 m (2,684 ft)

Geography
- Country: United States
- State: California
- District: Kern County
- Range coordinates: 34°55′23.914″N 117°58′45.250″W
- Topo map: USGS Edwards

The Bissell Hills are a mountain range in the Mojave Desert, in southeastern Kern County, California.
