= Three Sisters Circuit =

British motor racing circuit

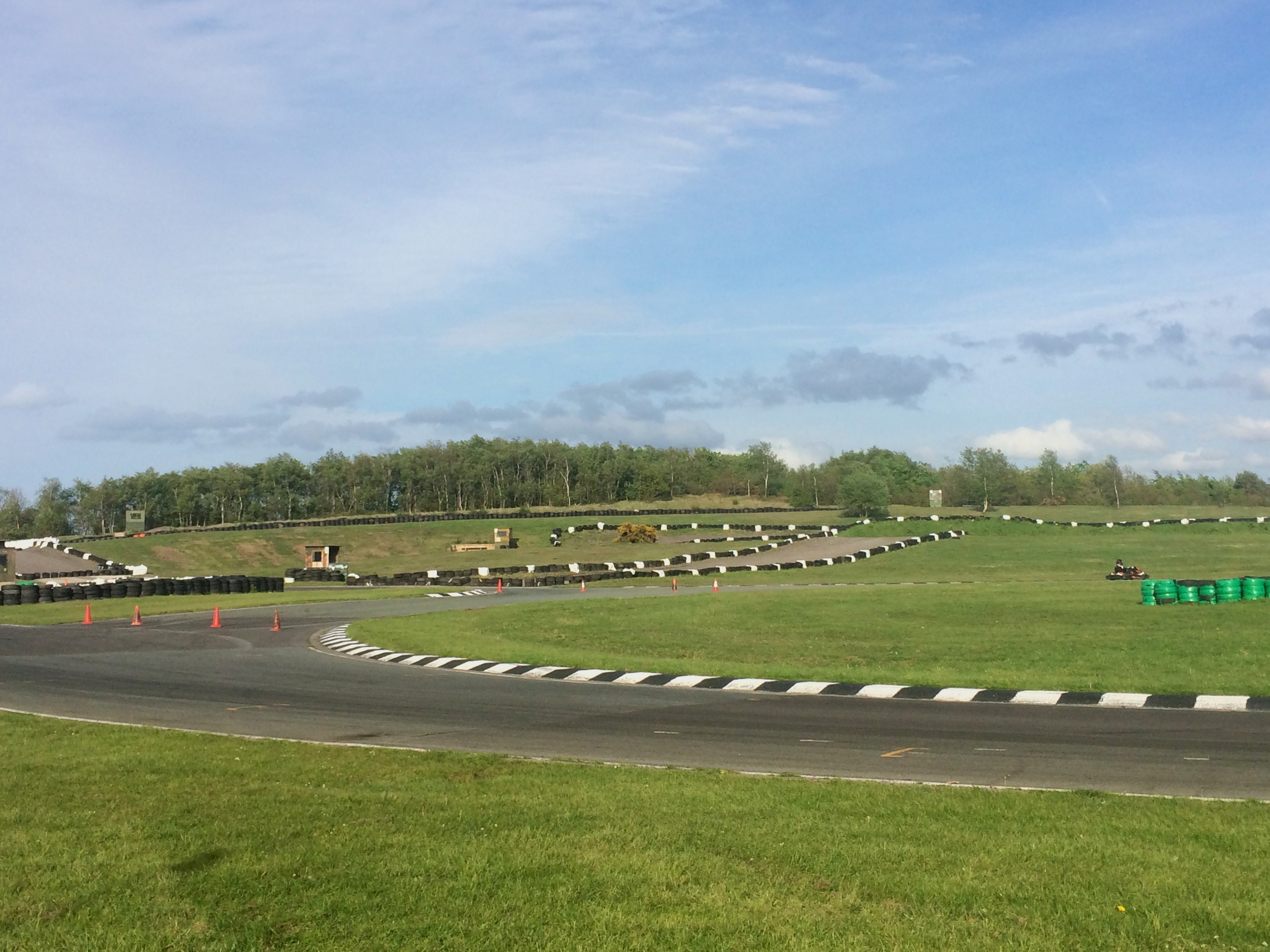
- Location: Ashton in Makerfield, England
- Coordinates: 53°30′22.4″N 2°37′57.7″W
- Opened: November 1978; 48 years ago
- Website: https://threesisterscircuit.co.uk/

Full Circuit
- Length: 1.497 km (0.930 mi)
- Turns: 8

The Three Sisters Circuit is a motor racing circuit in England, at Ashton in Makerfield, near Wigan in Greater Manchester.

== History ==
The site was originally occupied by the Garswood Hall Colliery, which began coal extraction operations in 1867. For nearly a century, the colliery was a major industrial enterprise, operating continuously until its closure in 1958.

The colliery created three massive spoil heaps composed of mining waste, which rose over 150 feet (46 m) tall. Locally dubbed the "Three Sisters," these structures became dominant landmarks in the post-industrial landscape of the Ashton in Makerfield area. Despite being considered environmental blights, the heaps earned the affectionate local moniker the "Three Sisters." In the late 1970s, Lancashire County Council initiated a major land reclamation project to repurpose the area into a nature reserve. Aside from its ecological features the reserve hosts the Three Sisters Circuit.

The circuit was opened in November 1978 and was originally a karting circuit but has since welcomed other forms of motorsport.

An extension was added to the circuit during the 1990s, creating the Full circuit. It also features multiple layouts including the Perimeter and Long circuits.

== Events ==
The circuit is primarily booked for four and two-wheeled club sport racing series. Between 2019 and 2022, the British Scooter Sport Series, among others, held several races at the track. Most recently, the circuit was featured in the Freetech Endurance Series for amateur motorcycle teams. Track days and karting events also take place at the track.

== Fatalities ==
On September 17, 1989, British motorcycle racer Howard Christian Halsall was killed in a crash on the track.

== Notable people ==
Notable people associated with the circuit include Neil Hodgson who won his first race at Three Sisters in 1990. The circuit was included in the 2006 season for McLaren Mercedes’ Champions of the Future with the champions of that season being future Formula One seven-time world champion Lewis Hamilton in the Cadet class, Andrew Delahunty in the Yamaha class and Gary Paffett in the Intercontinental class. Current Formula One drivers Lando Norris and George Russell regularly raced here during their karting years.
