= Mud Hills =

Mountain range of the Mojave Desert

- Location within California

Highest point
- Elevation: 4,222 ft (1,287 m)

Geography
- Country: United States
- State: California
- Region: Mojave Desert
- District: San Bernardino County
- Range coordinates: 35°3′33.917″N 117°0′26.144″W
- Topo map: USGS Mud Hills

The Mud Hills are a low mountain range in the Mojave Desert, in San Bernardino County, southern California.

They are north of Barstow, California, and northwest of the Calico Mountains.

The Mud Hills are located southwest of Lane Mountain, southeast of Black Mountain and Opal Mountain, northeast of Mount General, and east of Water Valley.
