= North Pinyon Mountains =

Mountain range in California, USA

- Location within California

Highest point
- Elevation: 1,079 m (3,540 ft)

Geography
- Country: United States
- State: California
- District: San Diego County
- Range coordinates: 33°5′22.160″N 116°23′8.049″W
- Topo map: USGS Earthquake Valley

The North Pinyon Mountains are a mountain range in San Diego County, California, USA.
