= Kilgore Hills =

- Location within California

Highest point
- Elevation: 1,101 m (3,612 ft)

Geography
- Country: United States
- State: California
- District: Siskiyou County
- Range coordinates: 41°41′27.510″N 122°37′2.092″W
- Topo map: USGS Montague

The Kilgore Hills are a mountain range in Siskiyou County, California.
