= Widow Valley Mountains =

Mountain range in California, United States

- Location within California

Highest point
- Elevation: 1,404 m (4,606 ft)

Geography
- Country: United States
- State: California
- District: Lassen County
- Range coordinates: 41°10′36.595″N 121°13′44.916″W
- Topo map: USGS Lookout

The Widow Valley Mountains are a mountain range in Lassen County, California.
