= Fenner Hills =

- Location within California Location within the United States

Highest point
- Elevation: 3,025 ft (922 m)

Geography
- Country: United States
- State: California
- District: San Bernardino County
- Range coordinates: 34°55′18.986″N 115°10′20.927″W
- Topo map: USGS Fenner Hills

The Fenner Hills are a low mountain range in the eastern Mojave Desert, in eastern San Bernardino County, southern California.

They are located within the southeastern corner of Mojave National Preserve, and are east of the Providence Mountains, near the junction of Goffs and Lanfair Roads.

They run perpendicular to Interstate 40 and historic Route 66 to the south.
