= Los Viejos =

- Location within California

Highest point
- Elevation: 185 m (607 ft)

Geography
- Country: United States
- State: California
- District: Kings County
- Range coordinates: 35°57′1.837″N 119°57′4.480″W
- Topo map: USGS Los Viejos

The Los Viejos are a mountain range in Kings County, California.
