= Black Hills (San Bernardino County) =

- Location within California Location within the United States

Highest point
- Elevation: 1,158 m (3,799 ft)

Geography
- Country: United States
- State: California
- District: San Bernardino County
- Range coordinates: 35°24′00″N 117°18′43″W
- Topo map: USGS Black Hills

The Black Hills are a mountain range in the Mojave Desert, in northwestern San Bernardino County, California.

They are a continuation of the Black Hills (Kern County).
