= Confidence Hills =

Mountain range in California, United States

- Location within California

Highest point
- Elevation: 137 m (449 ft)

Geography
- Country: United States
- State: California
- District: Inyo County
- Range coordinates: 35°51′22.857″N 116°38′23.132″W
- Topo map: USGS Confidence Hills West

The Confidence Hills are a mountain range in the Mojave Desert, in southern Inyo County, California.

They are known as Confidence Hills for their formation of favorable flower structures, which are developed in Pliocene to recent lacustrine and alluvial sentiments. Since Pliocene times, the Death Valley has been rapidly subsiding basin. For this reason, it has been the final resting place for draining waters in the eastern slope of Sierra Nevada, the northern slopes of the Traverse ranges, the Mojave Desert, and the desert in southwestern Nevada. During these Pleistocene times, the Sierra Nevada waters have drained into lake Owens and finally into lake China and lake Searles subsequently and Lake Panamint and eventually lake Manly. In the Mojave River, water drained from the Mojave area into the Death Valley. This drainage started less than one million years ago (Tabush et al., 2020).

The sediments’ plio-pleistocene of the confidence hills is located between two branches of the southern Death Valley fault zone. These sentiments are left stepping faults and lateral right faults. Their strata have a remarkable continuous record dated through tephra chronology and magnetostratigraphic. This covers an interval from at least 2.2 Ma to less than 1.5 Ma. The sediments comprise fine-grained anhydrite and clastic beds deposited in a lacustrine to playa setting, conglomerates, and sandstones deposited in alluvial to the fluvial fan setting and volcanic ashes. The sediments of pliopleistocene sequence form a series of South Eastern and North Western folds. These are part of the larger anticlinorium (Tabush et al., 2020).

== Formation ==
Generally, the formation of the Confidence Hills comprises most of the larger part of the hills to the eastern part of the branch in the southern and western parts of the Death Valley zone. The Confidence Hills are formed through deposition, where units of the deposit include silts, fine sands clay, and conspicuous anhydrides. These are translated as the playa, lacustrine and fluvial sediments. They are used to differentiate members of the formation. The deposits in the confusion canyon comprise fifteen volcanic ashes. The member in the lower part of the confidence hills includes massive and banded anhydrite beds. These beds form ridge tops and are restraint, and this provides local marker horizons. For this reason, this lower member is exposed by the anticlinal structure in the southern part

The middle member of the Confidence Hills comprises fine sands and banded anhydrite. In the Northern part, this central member exhibits less sand and more silt and clay-rich facies but still contain banded anhydrite. The halite crystal casts and desiccation cracks found within the middle layer indicate that it was subaerially exposed at given times. The contact existing contact between the lower member and the middle member is gradational. It is defined by the top of the highest massive bed of anhydrite within the 30metres level in the Murray and Beratan section. In this regard, the middle unit comprises the Huckleberry Ridge ash and more other ashes, both white and grey. The Huckleberry Ridge ash can be distinguished easily by its thickness of about 41 cm. The grey color provides a useful marker bed for canyons in the southern part ( Mikus et al. 2019).

The member in the upper region is differentiated from the lower region because of a simple reason. It does not contain banded anhydrite. It comprises red-brown fine-grained silt and sand and one massive anhydrite bed, which is isolated. This bed provides a useful marker bed in the young strata. The contact between the upper and middle unit is placed at the highest banded anhydrite in the Murray and Beratan section, and the sand near this contact region is green and red in color. These soils are well sorted. In the northern part, these upper regions are thicker and include paleosols and ash layers.

A facies that contains the clasts of the volcano, primarily basalts, are interbedded with the member in the middle region of the Confidence Hills formation. These facies are only exposed in the northwestern region part of the map area and abruptly thins to the southern part. Therefore, it is indurated with fine to the coarse-grained sandy matrix. In this regard, the matrix is dark in color, which is similar to the clasts, and this indicates that it may have been derived from the same basaltic source (Mikus et al. 2019).The conglomerate appears to have been deposited in the southern part, the distal portion of a fan which grades laterally into streams reworked sediments. These facies may correspond stratigraphically to layers with lenses of fine-grained sandy basaltic clasts in the southeastern canyons. It is believed that confidence hills in the northern part at Shoreline could be a source of volcanic clasts( Mikus et al. 2019).

The large asymmetrical anticlinorium runs through the confidence hills, with its axis learning almost parallel to the south region's fault. The beds nearing the top of the anticlinorium are overturned, chevron folds, and isoclinal. They contain sub-horizontal axial planes, which indicate low overburden at the time of folding. There have been reports that salts are involved in the anticlinorium core. Studies have shown that there has been salt bloom after the heavy rains and some karst like topography exposition at the western end of canyons and the southern part of the Death Valley fault trace. The anticlinorium in the Confidence Hills comprises two plunging anticlines (Mikus et al. 2019). . These anticlines converge in the middle of the structure, thus giving an hour shape of the glass to the sedimentary contacts. The anticlines in the southern part plunge to the Northern and northwest parts. Notably, the Confidence Hills have been translated as forming through trans tensional due to the left step in the lateral fault in the right side, but this brings about the element into any tectonic interpretation (Tabush et al., C. 2020).
