= Gravel Range =

Mountain range in California, United States

- Location within California

Highest point
- Elevation: 1,101 m (3,612 ft)

Geography
- Country: United States
- State: California
- District: Tuolumne County
- Range coordinates: 37°51′22.730″N 120°0′16.661″W
- Topo map: USGS Jawbone Ridge

for the mountain range in San Bernardino County, California. The Gravel Range is a mountain range in Tuolumne County, California.
