= Rosecrans Hills =

- Location within California Location within the United States

Highest point
- Elevation: 71 m (233 ft)

Geography
- Country: United States
- State: California
- District: Los Angeles County
- Range coordinates: 33°55′57.053″N 118°18′24.266″W
- Topo map: USGS Inglewood

The Rosecrans Hills are a low range of hills in the Transverse Ranges, in the South Los Angeles region of Los Angeles County, California.

The Rosecrans Hills run north–south in the communities of West Athens and Westmont. They are bisected by the Century Freeway (I−105), and Western Avenue, between Century Boulevard and El Segundo Boulevard.

== Notable people ==
- Thomas Bones (1842–1929), farmer and land developer in this area
