= Hemme Hills =

- Location within California

Highest point
- Elevation: 1,089 ft (332 m)
- Coordinates: 37°49′08″N 121°55′40″W

Geography
- Country: United States
- State: California
- County: Contra Costa County
- Topo map: USGS Diablo

The Hemme Hills are a mountain range in Contra Costa County, California.
