= The Three Sisters (Lake Huron) =

Geography
- Location: Lake Huron, Algoma District, Ontario, Canada
- Coordinates: 46°11′43″N 82°41′39″W
- Nearest city: Elliot Lake

The Three Sisters are a chain of three islands within the Canadian waters of Lake Huron, located 9 km (5.6 mi) east of Algoma Mills, Ontario in Algoma District.
