= Flynn Hills =

Mountain range in California, USA

- Location within California

Highest point
- Elevation: 308 m (1,010 ft)

Geography
- Country: United States
- State: California
- Region: Southwest
- District: Mendocino County
- Range coordinates: 39°10′39.630″N 123°31′47.039″W
- Topo map: USGS Navarro

The Flynn Hills are a mountain range in Mendocino County, California.
