= Yuha Buttes =

Landform in Imperial County, California

- Location within California Location within the United States

Highest point
- Elevation: 93 m (305 ft)

Geography
- Country: United States
- State: California
- District: Imperial County
- Range coordinates: 32°44′14.217″N 115°51′2.027″W
- Topo map: USGS Yuha Basin

The Yuha Buttes are a group of buttes in the Lower Colorado River Valley, in southern Imperial County, California.

The buttes are high points along a pair of en echelon northeast trending ridges in the Yuha Desert 6.5 miles (10.5 km) north of the border about 21 miles (34 km) west of Calexico. The highest point has an elevation of 340 feet (100 m) which is 100 to 250 feet above the surrounding desert. Sunrise Butte (elevation 387 ft.) lies 3.5 miles south and rises above California State Route 98, the Yuha Cutoff.
