= Ogilby Hills =

Landform in Imperial County, California

- Location within California

Highest point
- Elevation: 128 m (420 ft)

Geography
- Country: United States
- State: California
- District: Imperial County
- Range coordinates: 32°48′25.164″N 114°47′54.855″W
- Topo map: USGS Ogilby

The Ogilby Hills are a mountain range in Imperial County, California.

They are in the Lower Colorado River Valley and the Colorado Desert, near the Colorado River in the Cibola National Wildlife Refuge.
