= Larkspur Hills =

Mountain range in northeast California

- Location within California

Highest point
- Elevation: 1,564 m (5,131 ft)

Geography
- Country: United States
- State: California
- District: Modoc County
- Range coordinates: 41°49′27.610″N 120°3′16.808″W
- Topo map: USGS Larkspur Hills

The Larkspur Hills are a mountain range in Modoc County, California.
