= Ship Mountains =

Mountain range in California, United States

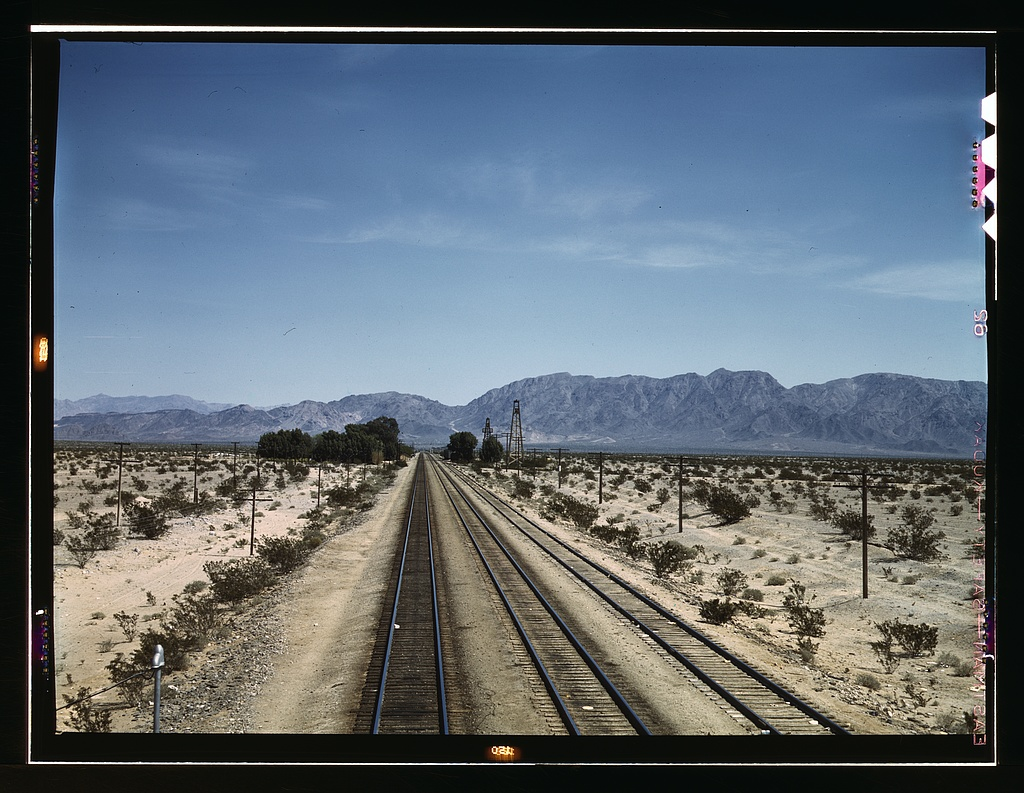

Highest point
- Peak: Cadiz Summit
- Elevation: 817 m (2,680 ft)

Geography
- Location within California
- Country: United States
- State: California
- District: San Bernardino County
- Range coordinates: 34°30′11.998″N 115°23′46.942″W
- Topo map: USGS Cadiz Summit

The Ship Mountains are a mountain range in San Bernardino County, California.
