= Three Sisters Recreation Area =

Nature reserve and park in Greater Manchester, England

Coordinates: 53.50854°N 2.62722°W

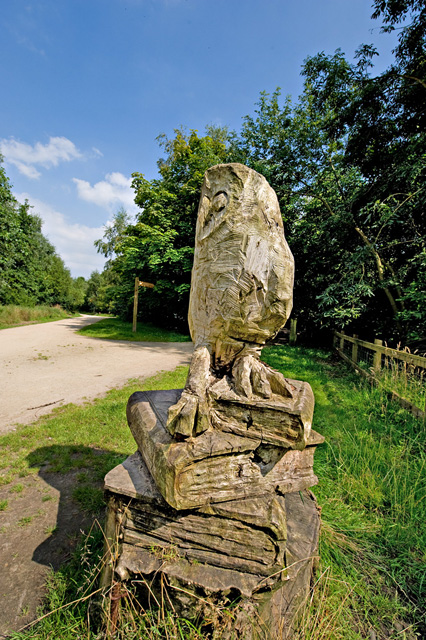
Three Sisters Recreation Area sculpture

Map showing the location of Three Sisters Recreation Area at grid reference SD585015

Three Sisters Recreation Area is located in Bryn, Ashton-in-Makerfield, Greater Manchester, England. In 2011 it was designated a Local Nature Reserve.

The area was reclaimed from three coal mining spoil tips and an old golf course during the 1970s and now comprises a large area of woodlands and ponds. It has become a flagship example of brownfield regeneration in Greater Manchester. The site also contains a popular motorsport race circuit, used mainly by karts. During the 1980s and 1990s Three Sisters also had a popular BMX track, featuring the Wigan Whoops and King Kong obstacles.
