= Little Signal Hills =

- Location within California Location within the United States

Highest point
- Elevation: 413 m (1,355 ft)

Geography
- Country: United States
- State: California
- District: Kern County
- Range coordinates: 35°5′34.886″N 119°26′32.428″W
- Topo map: USGS Maricopa

The Little Signal Hills are a low mountain range in the Transverse Ranges, in southeastern Kern County, California.
