= English Hills =

California mountain range

- Location within California Location within the United States

Highest point
- Elevation: 252 m (827 ft)

Geography
- Country: United States
- State: California
- District: Solano County
- Range coordinates: 38°26′10.671″N 122°1′13.887″W
- Topo map: USGS Mount Vaca

The English Hills are a low mountain range in Solano County, California.

The range runs along the southwestern edge of the Sacramento Valley. Vacaville is at their southern end.
