= Red Hills (San Luis Obispo County) =

- Location within California

Highest point
- Elevation: 744 m (2,441 ft)

Geography
- Country: United States
- State: California
- District: San Luis Obispo County
- Range coordinates: 35°35′43.888″N 120°14′58.539″W
- Topo map: USGS Holland Canyon

The Red Hills are a low mountain range in the interior California Coast Ranges, in eastern San Luis Obispo County, California.
