= New Range =

Mountain range in California, United States

- Location within California

Highest point
- Elevation: 3,012 m (9,882 ft)

Geography
- Country: United States
- State: California
- District: Mono County
- Range coordinates: 38°16′19.703″N 119°23′34.583″W
- Topo map: USGS Fales Hot Springs

The New Range is a mountain range in Mono County, California.
