= Kilbeck Hills =

- Location within California

Highest point
- Elevation: 1,585 ft (483 m)

Geography
- Country: United States
- State: California
- Region: Mojave Desert
- District: San Bernardino County
- Range coordinates: 34°18′45.020″N 115°18′29.935″W
- Topo map: USGS Chubbuck

The Kilbeck Hills are a low mountain range in the eastern Mojave Desert, in San Bernardino County, southern California.

They are located about 26 miles (42 km) west of the Turtle Mountains and of the BLM's Turtle Mountains Wilderness; and 44 miles (71 km) north northeast of the city of Twentynine Palms.
