= Waterman Hills =

- Location within California Location within the United States

Highest point
- Elevation: 3,363 ft (1,025 m)

Geography
- Country: United States
- State: California
- Region: Mojave Desert
- District: San Bernardino County
- Range coordinates: 34°58′13.927″N 117°2′22.148″W
- Topo map: USGS Barstow

The Waterman Hills are a low mountain range in the Mojave Desert, just north of Barstow in San Bernardino County, California and 1 mile northwest of the Mitchel Range.
