= Colton Hills =

Mountain range in California

- Location within California Location within the United States

Highest point
- Elevation: 3,579 ft (1,091 m)

Geography
- Country: United States
- State: California
- Region: Mojave Desert
- District(s): Mojave National Preserve, San Bernardino County
- Range coordinates: 34°57′45.972″N 115°25′57.959″W
- Topo map: USGS Colton Well

The Colton Hills are a low mountain range in the eastern Mojave Desert, protected within Mojave National Preserve, in Southern California.

They are located in northeastern San Bernardino County, just east of the Providence Mountains and southwest of the Woods Mountains.
