= Sherburne Hills =

Mountain range in California

- Location within California

Highest point
- Elevation: 259 m (850 ft)

Geography
- Country: United States
- State: California
- District: Contra Costa County
- Range coordinates: 37°47′50.736″N 121°56′54.852″W
- Topo map: USGS Diablo

The Sherburne Hills are a mountain range in Contra Costa County, California.
