= Merriam Mountains =

Mountain Range in California

- Location within California

Highest point
- Elevation: 423 m (1,388 ft)

Geography
- Country: United States
- State: California
- District: San Diego County
- Range coordinates: 33°12′45.132″N 117°8′44.119″W
- Topo map: USGS San Marcos

The Merriam Mountains are geologically composed primarily of igneous rocks formed during the Mid-Cretaceous period which began 145 Million years ago and ended 66 million years ago. The Merriam Mountain Range is home to coyotes, rabbits, rattlesnakes and a variety of common insect species. Fennel, an imported plant species native to Italy, can be found growing on some areas of the southern range.

The Merriam Mountains are a mountain range in San Diego County, California.
