= San Marcos Mountains =

Mountain range in California, United States

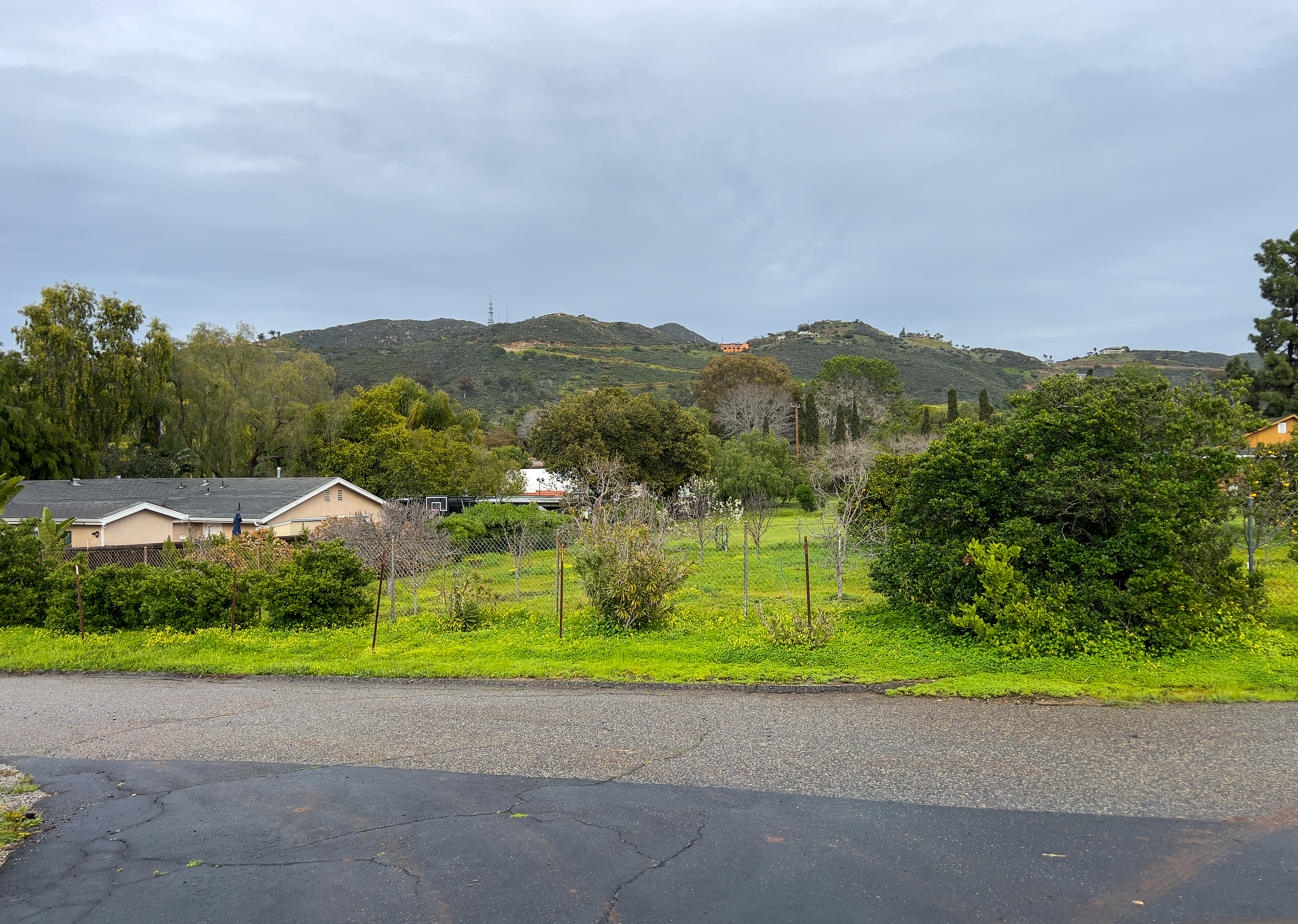
- A view of San Marcos Mountains from Vista, California

Highest point
- Elevation: 371 m (1,217 ft)

Geography
- Location within California
- Country: United States
- State: California
- District: San Diego County
- Range coordinates: 33°13′30″N 117°11′40″W
- Parent range: Peninsular Ranges
- Topo map: USGS San Marcos

The San Marcos Mountains are a mountain range in northwestern San Diego County, Southern California.

They are a small range of the Peninsular Ranges System.

Native undeveloped habitats of the San Marcos Mountains are in the California chaparral and woodlands ecoregion.

It includes communities such as San Elijo Hills and Elfin forest.
