= Whitehorse Mountains =

Mountain range in California, United States

- Location within California

Highest point
- Elevation: 1,452 m (4,764 ft)

Geography
- Country: United States
- State: California
- District: Siskiyou County
- Range coordinates: 41°17′36.583″N 121°29′41.956″W
- Topo map: USGS White Horse

The Whitehorse Mountains are a mountain range in Siskiyou County, California.
