= Fort Sage Mountains =

Mountain range in Nevada and California, US

- Location within California

Highest point
- Elevation: 2,393 m (7,851 ft)

Geography
- Country: United States
- States: Nevada and California
- Districts: Washoe County and Lassen County
- Range coordinates: 40°1′47.658″N 119°58′52.726″W
- Topo map: USGS State Line Peak

The Fort Sage Mountains are a mountain range running across the state borders in western Washoe County, Nevada, and eastern Lassen County, California.
