= White Hills (Inyo County) =

- Location within California Location within the United States

Highest point
- Elevation: 831 m (2,726 ft)

Geography
- Country: United States
- State: California
- District: Inyo County
- Range coordinates: 35°52′7.820″N 117°42′50.243″W
- Topo map: USGS White Hills

The White Hills are a mountain range in the Mojave Desert, east of U.S. Route 395 in southern Inyo County, California.

The White Hills are in the general region of the Coso Range, east of the Scodie Mountains and Sierra Nevadas, and south of the Owens Lake basin.
