= Paradise Range (California) =

Mountain range in California, United States

- Location within California

Highest point
- Elevation: 840 m (2,760 ft)

Geography
- Country: United States
- State: California
- District: San Bernardino County
- Range coordinates: 35°9′10.917″N 116°49′23.123″W
- Topo map: USGS Paradise Range

The Paradise Range is a mountain range in San Bernardino County, California. It is north of the Calico Mountains, northwest of Alvord Mountain and southwest of the Tiefort Mountains. The northern end is in Fort Irwin.
