= Kelsey Range =

American mountain range in California

- Location within California

Highest point
- Elevation: 1,733 m (5,686 ft)

Geography
- Country: United States
- State: California
- District: Siskiyou County
- Range coordinates: 41°41′28.433″N 123°34′40.222″W
- Topo map: USGS Bear Peak

The Kelsey Range is a mountain range in Siskiyou County, California.
