= Sawtooth Range (San Bernardino County) =

Mountain range in California, United States

- Location within California

Highest point
- Elevation: 582 m (1,909 ft)

Geography
- Country: United States
- State: California
- District: San Bernardino County
- Range coordinates: 34°33′30.032″N 114°36′39.868″W
- Topo map: USGS Chemehuevi Peak

The Sawtooth Range is a mountain range in eastern San Bernardino County, California.

They are in the Mojave Desert east of Lanfair Valley near the Colorado River and Nevada border.
