= Sagehen Hills =

- Location within California

Highest point
- Elevation: 2,131 m (6,991 ft)

Geography
- Country: United States
- State: California
- District: Nevada County
- Range coordinates: 39°24′35.661″N 120°14′24.724″W
- Topo map: USGS Hobart Mills

The Sagehen Hills are a low mountain range in Nevada County, California.

The Sagehen Hills are part of the Sagehen Creek watershed and lie entirely within the Sagehen Experimental Forest. Research has been a major management focus for the Sagehen basin since the founding of Sagehen Creek Field Station in 1951.

The Sagehen basin, including Sagehen Hills, differs from the surrounding watersheds in that it is essentially formed of un-glaciated volcanic overburden. Most of the Tahoe-Donner area is glacially scoured down to granite bed rock.
