= Panorama Antennas =

UK antenna manufacturer

Panorama Antennas Ltd
- Type: Private
- Industry: Antennas; Radio; Telecommunications
- Founded: London, UK (1947, as J.F.J. Products)
- Headquarters: Frogmore, Wandsworth, London, United Kingdom,
- Key people: Andrew Jesman, Managing Director; Christopher Jesman, Managing Director
- Products: Glass-mount antennas, TETRA antennas, 3G Data Card antennas, Wireless LAN antennas
- Website: Panorama-Antennas.com

Panorama Antennas Ltd is a British-based company that designs and manufactures communications antennas and closely related diplexer products. The business was established in London in 1947 to service the UK market but has since grown to become a global company with sales offices in six countries.

== History ==
Panorama Antennas Ltd. was founded in 1947, under the name of J.F.J. Products, by a group of ex-servicemem, including Leon Jesman. J.F.J. was a light engineering company that manufactured a diverse range of products from mop heads to Perspex cake stands to the kind of dolls’ eyes that close when the toy is laid flat.

In 1949, to improve the quality and reduce the cost of the company's dolls’ eyes, which were initially machined out of plastic blocks, Jesman designed and built a plastic insert injection moulding machine from surplus aeroplane parts, thereby becoming one of the pioneers of practical insert injection moulding.

JFJ's newfound injection moulding capabilities, which were virtually unique at the time for a company of its size, led to a radical rethinking of its manufacturing activities. Its work became centred upon producing parts for the expanding television market such as cable assemblies, connectors and, most notably, set-top antennas. With this change of focus came a change of name and in 1952 the business began trading as the Panorama Radio Company.

From this point on, supplying the growing demand for antennas in the European market became increasingly central to Panorama's operations, with the company eventually abandoning its other manufacturing activities to focus on this one aspect of the business. The kind of work Panorama performs in this field has changed over the years to keep pace with the emergence of new technologies. The company provided for TV in the 1950s and 1960s, supplied car antennas for portable transistor radios from the early 1960s, developed antennas for hand held VHF and UHF devices used by groups such as the Ministry of Defence and emergency services during the 1970s and, finally, dedicated its production activities to providing for the new cell phone systems which spread across Europe in the 1980s and 1990s.

The complete transformation of the company from general manufacturing to specialist antenna production was acknowledged in 1974, when the old partnership was reorganised and the current company, Panorama Antennas Limited, was formed as a concern wholly owned by the Jesman family.

== Current operations ==
GSM was integral to Panorama's operations until the late 1990s. The company was the first organisation to design and produce mobile antennas ready for the UK launch of the UK 900 MHz cellular network on 1 January 1985 and by 1998 had captured 75% of the market for external aerials used by mobile phone operators. It also became a founding member of the Federation of Communications Services Ltd. Panorama particularly came to specialize in providing GSM glassmount antennas for car kits and was not only the first company in Europe to sell glassmounts but also developed the first solid state coupling circuit for glassmounts in the world.

With the expansion of Panorama's operations as a result of the GSM boom came an increased attention to quality control and testing. In 1989 Panorama became the first European company to achieve ISO 9002 accreditation for antenna manufacture and during the 1990s began testing its antennas with an on-site anechoic chamber, another 'first of its kind' for antenna design in Europe.

The company manufactures antennas to suit all frequencies from 150 MHz to 5 GHz, covering a wide range of applications including 3G, DAB, GPRS, GPS, in-building, ISM Band, M2M, GSM, P25, PMR, TETRA UHF, TETRA 800 and LAN.

Panorama is based in Wandsworth, London, has sales offices in seven countries and an online store specialising in 3G and WLAN. The company is currently owned and run by Leon Jesman's sons, Andrew and Christopher, who act as joint managing directors.

== See also ==
- Antenna Products Corporation
