= Verdi Range =

Mountain range in California, United States

- Location within California Location within the United States

Highest point
- Elevation: 2,337 m (7,667 ft)

Geography
- Country: United States
- State: California
- District: Sierra County
- Range coordinates: 39°30′18.671″N 120°2′55.725″W
- Topo map: USGS Dog Valley

The Verdi Range is a mountain range in Sierra County, California that rises to 8,444 feet (2,574 m) above sea level.
