= Las Colinas (California) =

- Location within California

Highest point
- Elevation: 216 m (709 ft)

Geography
- Country: United States
- State: California
- District: Kings County
- Range coordinates: 35°48′14.854″N 119°56′24.485″W
- Topo map: USGS Avenal Gap

Las Colinas is a mountain range in Kings County, California.
