= Panhandle Hills =

Mountain range in California, United States

- Location within California

Highest point
- Elevation: 1,443 m (4,734 ft)

Geography
- Country: United States
- State: California
- District: Siskiyou County
- Range coordinates: 41°46′7.558″N 121°39′23.987″W
- Topo map: USGS Mount Dome

The Panhandle Hills are a mountain range in Siskiyou County, California.
