= Telephone Hills =

Hills in California, United States

- Location within California

Highest point
- Elevation: 611 m (2,005 ft)

Geography
- Country: United States
- State: California
- District: Kern County
- Range coordinates: 35°14′25.878″N 119°38′30.448″W
- Topo map: USGS Panorama Hills

The Telephone Hills are a series of hills in the interior California Coast Ranges, in western Kern County, California near McKittrick. They are immediately west of Derby Acres.

The hills contain gypsum and kit foxes.
