= Hoodoo Hills =

Mountain range in California, US

- Location within California

Highest point
- Elevation: 124 m (407 ft)

Geography
- Country: United States
- State: California
- District: Glenn County
- Range coordinates: 39°32′3.572″N 122°19′45.950″W
- Topo map: USGS Stone Valley

The Hoodoo Hills are a mountain range in Glenn County, California.
