= Eagle Hills =

Low mountain range in California

- Location within California Location within the United States

Highest point
- Elevation: 636 m (2,087 ft)

Geography
- Country: United States
- State: California
- District: San Luis Obispo County
- Range coordinates: 35°44′52.882″N 120°22′13.551″W
- Topo map: USGS Cholame

The Eagle Hills are a low mountain range in the Southern Coast Ranges, in eastern San Luis Obispo County, California.
