= Crystal Peak (Sierra County, California) =

Mountain in Sierra County, California, United States

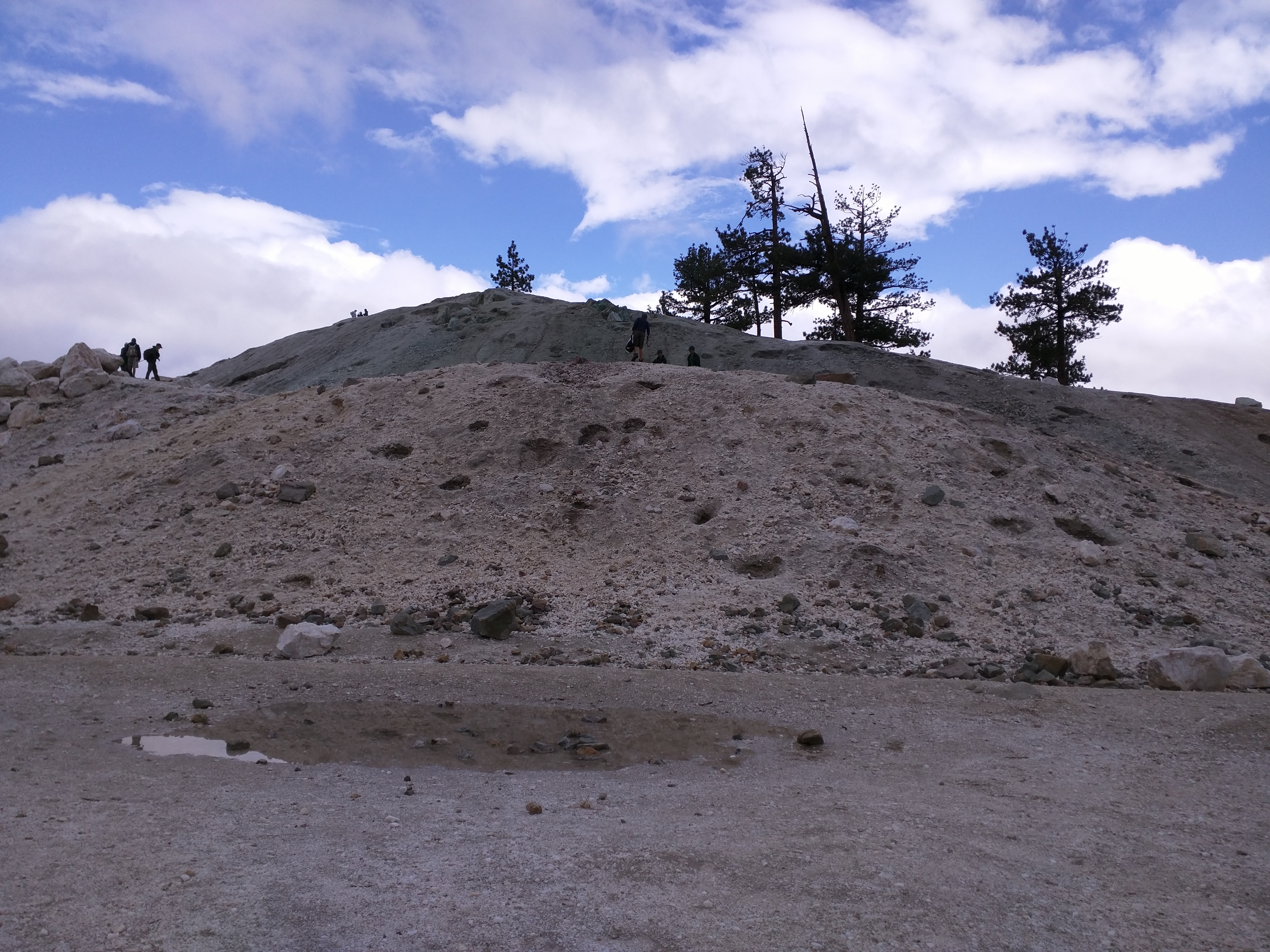
- The crystal mine

Highest point
- Elevation: 8,107 ft (2,471 m)
- Prominence: 263 ft (80 m)
- Coordinates: 39°33′28″N 120°05′18″W

Geography
- Location within California
- Location: Sierra County, California
- Parent range: Bald Mountain Range, Sierra Nevada

Crystal Peak is a mountain in Sierra County, California. It is located on the south end of the Bald Mountain Range, 3 mi (4.8 km) northeast of Sardine Valley and 16 mi (25.6 km) northwest of Reno, Nevada.

== Crystal Mine ==
The first recorded visit to the Crystal Peak (on which the mine is located) was in 1845 by a Stevens wagon train. After the town of Crystal was abandoned, the local roads fell into disrepair (later being reconstructed in 1992). As of 2020, general public can access the Crystal Mine, although a limit of one 5 gallon bucket of crystals per vehicle per week is in effect.
