= Poverty Hills =

- Location within California

Highest point
- Elevation: 1,389 m (4,557 ft)

Geography
- Country: United States
- State: California
- District: Inyo County
- Range coordinates: 37°2′59.759″N 118°14′57.358″W
- Topo map: USGS Tinemaha Reservoir

The Poverty Hills are a mountain range in northwestern Inyo County of eastern California, northwest of Bishop and the upper Owens Valley.

They are east of and below the Sierra Nevada, in the Round Valley area, and just west of Tinemaha Reservoir and the Owens River.
