= Pine Hills (California) =

- Location within California Location within the United States

Highest point
- Elevation: 1,408 m (4,619 ft)

Geography
- Country: United States
- State: California
- District: San Diego County
- Range coordinates: 33°16′53.133″N 116°48′17.083″W
- Topo map: USGS Palomar Observatory

The Pine Hills are a low mountain range of the Peninsular Ranges, in central San Diego County, California.
