= Bird Hills =

- Location within California

Highest point
- Elevation: 1,377 m (4,518 ft)

Geography
- Country: United States
- State: California
- District: Lassen County
- Range coordinates: 40°5′9.649″N 120°11′13.749″W
- Topo map: USGS McKesick Peak

The Bird Hills are a mountain range in Lassen County, California.
