= Tecopa Hills =

- Location within California Location within the United States

Highest point
- Elevation: 523 m (1,716 ft)

Geography
- Country: United States
- State: California
- District: Inyo County
- Range coordinates: 35°51′56.876″N 116°13′47.087″W
- Topo map: USGS Tecopa

The Tecopa Hills are a mountain range of the Mojave Desert in extreme eastern Inyo County, California.

They are east of lower Death Valley and the Amargosa Range, near the Amargosa River and Tecopa, California.
