= Crafton Hills =

- Location within California Location within the United States

Highest point
- Elevation: 3,297 ft (1,005 m)

Geography
- Country: United States
- State: California
- District: San Bernardino County
- Range coordinates: 34°3′46.047″N 117°4′10.119″W
- Topo map: USGS Yucaipa

The Crafton Hills are a low mountain range of the Transverse Ranges System, in Southern California.

They are located near Yucaipa, east of the city of San Bernardino in San Bernardino County. The range is south of the San Bernardino Mountains foothills.
