= Call Mountains =

Mountain range in San Benito, California, US

- Location within California

Highest point
- Elevation: 1,135 m (3,724 ft)

Geography
- Country: United States
- State: California
- District: San Benito County
- Range coordinates: 36°37′2.851″N 121°4′40.696″W
- Topo map: USGS San Benito

The Call Mountains are a mountain range in San Benito County, California.
