= Mineral Range =

Mountain range in California

- Location within California

Highest point
- Elevation: 1,083 m (3,553 ft)

Geography
- Country: United States
- State: California
- District: Siskiyou County
- Range coordinates: 41°36′11.502″N 122°47′41.111″W
- Topo map: USGS Fort Jones

The Mineral Range is a mountain range in Siskiyou County, California.
