= Ord Mountains (south of Apple Valley, California) =

Landform in San Bernardino County, California

- Location within California

Highest point
- Elevation: 1,509 m (4,951 ft)

Dimensions
- Length: 6.4 mi (10.3 km)
- Width: 3 mi (4.8 km)

Geography
- Country: United States
- State: California
- District: San Bernardino County
- Range coordinates: 34°23′24.6″N 117°11′34.2″W
- Topo map: USGS Apple Valley South

The Ord Mountains are a small range six miles south of the Apple Valley post office, and five miles southeast of the Hesperia post office. They are about 6.4 miles long (southwest to northeast), about three miles wide at the south end, and less than 1.5 miles wide in the north.

== Geography ==
The mountains are labelled on the south end of the Apple Valley South USGS quadrangle map, and the north end of the Lake Arrowhead quadrangle. The high point is 4951 feet, at 34°23′24.6″N 117°11′34.2″E. The range is north of Deep Creek, east of the Mojave River, south of Fifteenmile Valley, and west of Juniper Flats. A canyon bisects the range at latitude 34.377 north. Most of the range is federally owned, administered by the Bureau of Land Management; the southern end is part of San Bernardino National Forest. The range was named after Edward Otho Cresap Ord, who led some soldiers in a fight with Native Americans “in some hills between Lucerne and Hesperia.”

== Geology ==
The mountains have a diverse mix of dolomite and limestone marble, granite, hornblende syenite, quartz monzonite, monzodiorite, hornblende diorite, pegmatite, schist, phyllite, quartzite, hornfels, sedimentary breccia, and alluvial deposits.

== Botany ==
An environmental report done by Insignia Environmental for Southern California Edison reported several vegetation alliances: Ephedra nevadensis (Nevada ephedra) shrubland alliance, Ericameria nauseosa (rubber rabbitbrush) shrubland alliance, Eriogonum fasciculatum (California buckwheat) shrubland alliance, Prunus fasciculata (desert almond) shrubland alliance, Purshia tridentata (bitterbrush) shrubland alliance, Salazaria mexicana (bladder-sage) shrubland alliance, and Salix exigua (narrow-leaf willow) woodland alliance.
