= The Palisades (Napa County) =

Mountain range in California

- Location within California

Highest point
- Elevation: 761 m (2,497 ft)

Geography
- Country: United States
- State: California
- District: Napa County
- Range coordinates: 38°38′9.663″N 122°34′2.938″W
- Topo map: USGS Detert Reservoir

The Palisades are a mountain range in Napa County, California. The Palisades are located in Robert Louis Stevenson State Park on the other side of California State Route 29 as Mt. St. Helena. The Palisades trailhead is located on the valley floor of the Napa Valley near Calistoga and is a 6-mile one way hike.
