= Black Hills (Kern County) =

Mountain range in California, United States

- Location within California Location within the United States

Highest point
- Elevation: 1,316 m (4,318 ft)

Geography
- Country: United States
- State: California
- District: Kern County
- Range coordinates: 35°29′17.847″N 117°51′52.240″W
- Topo map: USGS Garlock

The Black Hills are a mountain range in the Mojave Desert, in eastern Kern County, California.

They are a continuation of the Black Hills (San Bernardino County).
