= Mitchel Range =

Mountain Range in California, United States

- Location within California

Highest point
- Elevation: 863 m (2,831 ft)

Geography
- Country: United States
- State: California
- District: San Bernardino County
- Range coordinates: 34°56′32.931″N 117°0′12.144″W
- Topo map: USGS Barstow

The Mitchel Range is a mountain range in San Bernardino County, California, United States. It is 2 miles northeast of Barstow, 1 mile southeast of the Waterman Hills and 5 miles south-southwest of the Calico Mountains.
