= Pinyon Mountains =

Mountain range in California, United States

- Location within California

Highest point
- Elevation: 1,363 m (4,472 ft)

Geography
- Country: United States
- State: California
- Region: Colorado Desert
- District(s): Anza-Borrego Desert State Park, San Diego County
- Range coordinates: 33°3′22.165″N 116°20′28.046″W
- Topo map: USGS Whale Peak

The Pinyon Mountains are a mountain range in eastern San Diego County, Southern California. The range is protected within Anza Borrego Desert State Park.

The Pinyon Mountains are in the ecotone of the Colorado Desert ecoregion (from east) and of the California montane chaparral and woodlands ecoregion (from west). They are in the rain shadow of the taller Peninsular Ranges.
