= Los Jinetes =

Mountain range in Kings County, California

- Location within California

Highest point
- Elevation: 380 m (1,250 ft)

Geography
- Country: United States
- State: California
- District: Kings County
- Range coordinates: 36°0′58.837″N 120°4′46.492″W
- Topo map: USGS La Cima

The Los Jinetes are a mountain range in Kings County, California.
