= Las Alturas =

- Location within California

Highest point
- Elevation: 175 m (574 ft)

Geography
- Country: United States
- State: California
- District: Kings County
- Range coordinates: 35°56′1.840″N 119°59′5.484″W
- Topo map: USGS Los Viejos

The Las Alturas are a mountain range in Kings County, California.
