= Rosamond Hills =

Mountain range in California

- Location within California Location within the United States

Highest point
- Elevation: 919 m (3,015 ft)

Geography
- Country: United States
- State: California
- District: Kern County
- Range coordinates: 34°54′33.915″N 118°3′49.259″W
- Topo map: USGS Bissell

The Rosamond Hills are a low mountain range in the Mojave Desert, in eastern Kern County, California.

The hills are located the northeastern Antelope Valley, between Rosamond and Mojave. They are bisected by California State Route 14.
