= Devils Hole Hills =

Mountain range in Nevada, United States

- Location within Nevada

Highest point
- Elevation: 994 m (3,261 ft)

Geography
- Country: United States
- State: Nevada
- District: Nye County
- Range coordinates: 36°19′39.849″N 116°10′50.123″W
- Topo map: USGS High Peak

The Devils Hole Hills are a mountain range in Nye County, Nevada.
