= Spangler Hills =

Mountain range in California, US

- Location within California

Highest point
- Elevation: 3,317 ft (1,011 m)

Geography
- Country: United States
- State: California
- Region: Mojave Desert
- District: San Bernardino County
- Range coordinates: 35°33′56.850″N 117°30′55.209″W
- Topo map: USGS Spangler Hills West

The Spangler Hills are a low mountain range in the Mojave Desert, in northwestern San Bernardino County, California.

They are east of Ridgecrest and west of the Panamint Range, in an area managed by the Bureau of Land Management.
