= Horse Hills =

- Location within California

Highest point
- Elevation: 4,314 ft (1,315 m)

Geography
- Country: United States
- State: California
- District: San Bernardino County
- Range coordinates: 34°49′10.970″N 115°35′36.974″W
- Topo map: USGS Van Winkle Spring

The Horse Hills are a low mountain range in the eastern Mojave Desert, in eastern San Bernardino County, southern California.

== Geography ==
The hills are protected within the Mojave National Preserve.

The Horse Hills are east of and across the Kelbaker Road from the Granite Mountains, and south of the Providence Mountains. Interstate 40 and historic Route 66 are to the south.
