= Casmalia Hills =

Mountain range in California, US

- Location within California Location within the United States

Highest point
- Elevation: 222 m (728 ft)

Geography
- Country: United States
- State: California
- District: Santa Barbara County
- Range coordinates: 34°51′24.926″N 120°33′24.607″W
- Topo map: USGS Casmalia

The Casmalia Hills are a mountain range in the Transverse Ranges, in western Santa Barbara County, California.
