= Horned Toad Hills =

Mountain range in California, United States

- Location within California Location within the United States

Highest point
- Elevation: 1,042 m (3,419 ft)

Geography
- Country: United States
- State: California
- District: Kern County
- Range coordinates: 35°5′29.886″N 118°13′3.277″W
- Topo map: USGS Mojave

The Horned Toad Hills (also known as Tehachapi Mountains) are a low mountain range in the Mojave Desert, in southeastern Kern County, California.
