= Amedee Mountains =

Mountain range in California, United States

- Location within California

Highest point
- Elevation: 1,849 m (6,066 ft)

Geography
- Country: United States
- State: California
- District: Lassen County
- Range coordinates: 40°20′14.648″N 120°8′27.757″W
- Topo map: USGS Wendel

The Amedee Mountains is a mountain range located in Lassen County, California, United States. Its highest point of elevation is at 1,849 meters (6,066 feet).
