= Shale Hills =

- Location within California

Highest point
- Elevation: 331 m (1,086 ft)

Geography
- Country: United States
- State: California
- District: Kern County
- Range coordinates: 35°36′50.872″N 120°1′11.506″W
- Topo map: USGS Packwood Creek

The Shale Hills are a low mountain range in the interior California Coast Ranges, in western Kern County, California.
