= Adobe Hills =

Mountain range in California, United States

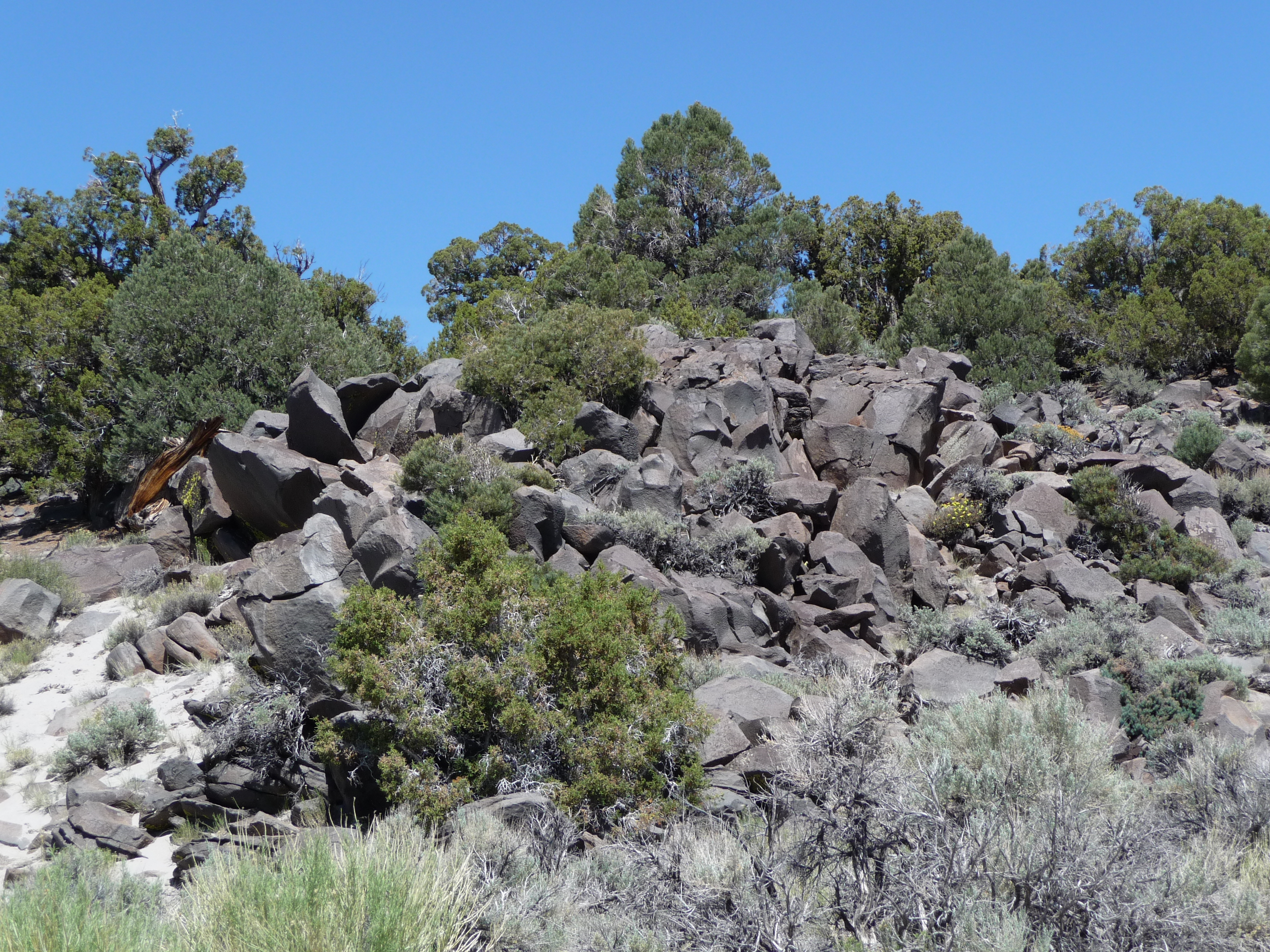
- Basalt outcrop in the Adobe Hills

Highest point
- Elevation: 2,322 m (7,618 ft)

Geography
- Location within California
- Country: United States
- State: California
- District: Mono County
- Range coordinates: 37°59′47.746″N 118°39′25.469″W
- Topo map: USGS Indian Meadows

The Adobe Hills are a low mountain range located in Mono County, Eastern California. It is also a volcanic field located on a fault zone within the western Mina Deflection near the northern Eastern California shear zone (ECSZ) and the Walker Lane belt (WLB). This fault has an east-west horizontal expansion of about 0.1 millimeters a year.

== Geology ==
The rocks they make up the Adobe hills are mainly dominated by tuffaceous sandstone, basaltic lavas and basaltic cinder cones that are of Pliocene age forming around 3.13 ±0.02 to 3.43 ±0.01 million years ago. There is also an unconformity causing the Pliocene rocks to overlay latite ignimbrite rocks that formed during the Middle Miocene epoch around 11.17 ±0.04 million years ago. Overlying the Pliocene age deposits are tuffaceous sands, alluvium, and lacustrine deposits from the Quaternary period.

=== Spillways ===
The Adobe hills have been the site of spillways at least twice that occurred around 760,000 years ago and possibly as late as just 100,000 years ago. Discharge from prehistoric Lake Russell spilled southward through the Adobe hills and into the Owens–Death Valley lake system.

== See also ==
- Bodie Hills
- Bodie, California
