= Middle Hills =

- Location within California

Highest point
- Elevation: 2,989 ft (911 m)

Geography
- Country: United States
- State: California
- Region: Mojave Desert
- District(s): Mojave National Preserve, San Bernardino County
- Range coordinates: 34°43′3.977″N 115°34′21.969″W
- Topo map: USGS Van Winkle Wash

The Middle Hills are a mountain range in the Mojave Desert, within the Mojave National Preserve, in eastern San Bernardino County, southern California, United States. They are south of Interstate 40, northeast of the Marble Mountains and west of the Clipper Mountains. Interstate 15 is to the north, between the Middle Hills and Van Winkle Mountain.
