= Cottonwood Mountains (Lassen County) =

Mountain range in California, United States

- Location within California

Highest point
- Elevation: 2,150 m (7,050 ft)

Geography
- Country: United States
- State: California
- District: Lassen County
- Range coordinates: 40°58′33.630″N 120°4′9.764″W
- Topo map: USGS Buckhorn Lake

The Cottonwood Mountains are a mountain range in eastern Lassen County, California, near Nevada.
