= Panorama Hills (California) =

- Location within California

Highest point
- Elevation: 703 m (2,306 ft)

Geography
- Country: United States
- State: California
- District: San Luis Obispo County
- Range coordinates: 35°10′59.888″N 119°43′3.462″W
- Topo map: USGS Panorama Hills

The Panorama Hills are a mountain range in the interior California Coast Ranges, in eastern San Luis Obispo County, California.
