= Gravel Hills =

- Location within California Location within the United States

Highest point
- Elevation: 1,176 m (3,858 ft)

Dimensions
- Length: 11 mi (18 km) east-west

Geography
- Country: United States
- State: California
- Region: Mojave Desert
- District: San Bernardino County
- Range coordinates: 35°12′37″N 117°22′15″W
- Topo map(s): USGS Bird Spring and Fremont Peak

The Gravel Hills are a low mountain range in the central Mojave Desert, in northwestern San Bernardino County, California.

They are located northwest of Barstow, northeast of Freemont Peak, southwest of Slocum Mountain, and northwest of Black Mountain.
