= Oat Hills (Mariposa County) =

- Location within California

Highest point
- Elevation: 400 m (1,300 ft)

Geography
- Country: United States
- State: California
- District: Mariposa County
- Range coordinates: 37°44′30.747″N 120°20′43.695″W
- Topo map: USGS Penon Blanco Peak

The Oat Hills are a mountain range in Mariposa County, California.
