= Nelson Range (California) =

Mountain range in Inyo County, California, United States

Coordinates: 36°33′25″N 117°39′23″W

The Nelson Range is a mountain range in the "Northern Mojave-Mono Lake region" of Inyo County, California, in Death Valley National Park.

The range was named for Edward William Nelson who explored this region.

== Geography ==
The range is located on the western side of Death Valley, framing the west side of the Racetrack Playa with the Cottonwood Mountains to the east.

On the west of the Nelson Range is the Saline Valley, and the Panamint Range is to the south.

== See also ==
- Category: Mountain ranges of the Mojave Desert
- Category: Protected areas of the Mojave Desert
