= Bald Mountain Range =

Mountain range in California, United States

- Location within California

Highest point
- Elevation: 2,601 m (8,533 ft)

Geography
- Country: United States
- State: California
- District: Sierra County
- Range coordinates: 39°35′35.666″N 120°6′10.727″W
- Topo map: USGS Dog Valley

The Bald Mountain Range is a mountain range in Sierra County, California, and is one of the locations where the Washoe Pine is found.
