= Three Sisters (Riverside County) =

Mountain range in Riverside county, California

- Location within California

Highest point
- Elevation: 1,886 ft (575 m)

Geography
- Country: United States
- State: California
- Region: Temescal Mountains
- District: Riverside County
- Range coordinates: 33°52′11″N 117°21′34″W
- Topo map: USGS Steele Peak

The Three Sisters is a small mountain range, or a mountain with three summits, within the northeastern Temescal Mountains, in Woodcrest within unincorporated Riverside County, California. the highest peak is nicknamed "Flat Top" because of the flattened top it has. There are many local rumors as to why the top of the hill was flattened. The locals walk, ride horses and ride motorcycles on flattop daily. Woodcrest's own 4 July fireworks takes place there annually.

The Three Sisters, is located east and north of Mockingbird Canyon, and south of Woodcrest.
