= Burnt Hills =

- Location within California

Highest point
- Elevation: 857 m (2,812 ft)

Geography
- Country: United States
- State: California
- District: Santa Clara County
- Range coordinates: 37°24′35.769″N 121°33′3.795″W
- Topo map: USGS Eylar Mountain

The Burnt Hills are a mountain range in Santa Clara County, California.
