= Stepladder Mountains =

Mountain range in southern California, United States

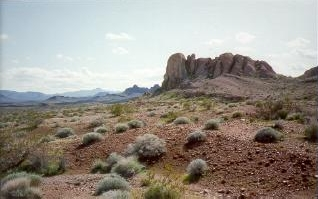
- Stepladder Mountains

Highest point
- Elevation: 806 m (2,644 ft)

Geography
- Location within California
- Country: United States
- State: California
- District: San Bernardino County
- Range coordinates: 34°33′47.023″N 114°51′47.887″W
- Topo map: USGS Stepladder Mountains

The Stepladder Mountains are located in southeastern California in the United States. The range, found in San Bernardino County, is home to the 84,199-acre (approximate) Stepladder Mountains Wilderness, which protects the Desert tortoise, California's state reptile. The mountains are located east of the Old Woman Mountains and north of the Turtle Mountains, about 29 miles (47 km) southeast of the town of Essex.

The dominant vegetation consists of creosote bush scrub on the bajadas, and microphylla woodlands within the washes; palo verde, smoketree, and catclaw are typically the trees found in the woodlands. A small stand of crucifixion thorn and a dense stand of teddy bear cholla are also found in the area. Wildlife is typical for the Mojave Desert; including coyote, black-tailed jackrabbits, ground squirrels, kangaroo rats, quail, roadrunners, rattlesnakes, and several species of lizards.
