= Four Brothers (mountain range) =

Mountain range in California, United States

- Location within California

Highest point
- Elevation: 1,618 m (5,308 ft)

Geography
- Country: United States
- State: California
- District: Del Norte County
- Range coordinates: 41°44′8.416″N 123°47′34.252″W
- Topo map: USGS Ship Mountain

The Four Brothers are a series of four mountain peaks in Del Norte County, California. All peaks are about a mile high the highest at 5310 ft. The southernmost peak contains an active fire lookout staffed by the USFS which can be accessed by Forest route 16N02A in the summer months. The peaks are known as Ship Mountain to locals and can be seen clearly from nearby Crescent City. During the winter season the area receives significant snowfall.
