= The Girdle =

- Location within California

Highest point
- Elevation: 522 m (1,713 ft)

Geography
- Country: United States
- State: California
- District: Sonoma County
- Range coordinates: 38°42′42.678″N 123°9′19.018″W
- Topo map: USGS Tombs Creek

The Girdle is a mountain range in Sonoma County, California.
