= Dougherty Hills =

Mountain range in California, United States

- Location within California

Highest point
- Elevation: 206 m (676 ft)

Geography
- Country: United States
- State: California
- District: Contra Costa County
- Range coordinates: 37°44′53.741″N 121°55′28.849″W
- Topo map: USGS Dublin

The Dougherty Hills are a mountain range in Contra Costa County, California.
