= Pleito Hills =

- Location within California Location within the United States

Highest point
- Elevation: 1,406 m (4,613 ft)

Geography
- Country: United States
- State: California
- Region: Transverse Ranges
- District: Kern County
- Range coordinates: 34°56′13.899″N 119°2′53.377″W
- Topo map: USGS Pleito Hills

The Pleito Hills are a low mountain range of the Transverse Ranges System, located in southwestern Kern County, California.

The range is between the San Emigdio Mountains and the San Joaquin Valley, west of the Interstate 5—Highway 99 junction and of the Tehachapi Mountains.
