= Three Sisters (Siskiyou County) =

Mountain range in California

- Location within California

Highest point
- Elevation: 1,358 m (4,455 ft)

Naming
- Native name: asavêehkak (Karok)

Geography
- Country: United States
- State: California
- District: Siskiyou County
- Range coordinates: 41°44′40.571″N 121°28′23.971″W
- Topo map: USGS Caldwell Butte

The Three Sisters are a mountain range in Siskiyou County, California. The Karuk name for the Three Sisters is asavêehkak.
