= Buena Vista Hills (Kern County) =

Mountain range of the Transverse Ranges System, in Kern County, California

- Location within California Location within the United States

Highest point
- Elevation: 390 m (1,280 ft)

Geography
- Country: United States
- State: California
- Region: Transverse Ranges
- District: Kern County
- Range coordinates: 35°12′23.876″N 119°29′6.429″W
- Topo map: USGS Taft

The Buena Vista Hills are a mountain range of the Transverse Ranges System, located in western Kern County, California.

They are on the southwestern edge of the San Joaquin Valley, near the site of the former Buena Vista Lake.
