= Sweitzer Hills =

- Location within California Location within the United States

Highest point
- Elevation: 180 m (590 ft)

Geography
- Country: United States
- State: California
- Region: Inner Northern California Coast Ranges
- District(s): Capay Valley, Yolo County
- Range coordinates: 38°47′40.646″N 122°11′15.909″W
- Topo map: USGS Guinda

The Sweitzer Hills are a low and short mountain range within the Capay Valley, in northern Yolo County, California.

They are in the Inner Northern California Coast Ranges System.
