= San Felipe Hills (Santa Clara County) =

Mountain range in California, United States of America

- Location within California

Highest point
- Elevation: 1,003 m (3,291 ft)

Geography
- Country: United States
- State: California
- District: Santa Clara County
- Range coordinates: 37°17′39.785″N 121°37′40.802″W
- Topo map: USGS Lick Observatory

The San Felipe Hills are a mountain range in Santa Clara County, California, located partly in the city of San Jose.

== See also ==
- Diablo Range
- Santa Teresa Hills
