= Sand Hills (California) =

- Location within California Location within the United States

Highest point
- Elevation: 146 m (479 ft)

Geography
- Country: United States
- State: California
- District: Yuba County
- Range coordinates: 39°13′22.614″N 121°19′1.856″W
- Topo map: USGS Smartsville

The Sand Hills are a low mountain range of the eastern Sacramento Valley, located in Yuba County, California.
