= Three Sisters (Los Angeles County) =

- Location within California

Highest point
- Peak: 3,410 feet (1,040 m) (highest peak)
- Prominence: 290 feet (88 m) (highest peak)

Geography
- Country: United States
- State: California
- District: Los Angeles County
- Range coordinates: 34°32′11.979″N 117°42′25.213″W
- Topo map: USGS El Mirage

The Three Sisters is a small mountain range found in the Mojave Desert, in Los Angeles County, California. It consists of three main hills of varying sizes, with the smallest to the southwest having a height above surrounding land of 150 feet (46 m), the second 180 feet (55 m), and the third and largest to the northeast having a height of 290 feet (88 m). They three main hills are the highly eroded remnants of what used to be the peaks of the northern San Gabriel Mountains, before recent sediment filled the area.
