= Oat Hills (San Diego County) =

- Location within California

Highest point
- Elevation: 462 m (1,516 ft)

Geography
- Country: United States
- State: California
- District: San Diego County
- Range coordinates: 33°13′11.131″N 117°6′5.115″W
- Topo map: USGS Valley Center

The Oat Hills are a low mountain range in San Diego County, California.

The Oat Hills are to the west of the Laguna Mountains.
