= Oat Hills (Yuba County) =

Mountain range in California, US

- Location within California Location within the United States

Highest point
- Elevation: 309 m (1,014 ft)

Geography
- Country: United States
- State: California
- District: Yuba County
- Range coordinates: 39°15′21.613″N 121°18′41.858″W
- Topo map: USGS Oregon House

The Oat Hills are a low mountain range of the eastern Sacramento Valley, located in Yuba County, California.
