= Kit Fox Hills =

- Location within California

Highest point
- Elevation: 270.2 m (886 ft)

Geography
- Country: United States
- State: California
- District: Inyo County
- Range coordinates: 36°40′2.810″N 117°2′42.220″W
- Topo map: USGS Stovepipe Wells NE

The Kit Fox Hills is a mountain range located in east-central Death Valley National Park in Inyo County, California. The range is situated between the Mesquite Flat Sand Dunes to the west and Grapevine Mountains to the east, along the North Highway (also known as Scotty's Castle Road), east of Stovepipe Wells and north of Furnace Creek.
