= Oat Hills (Colusa County) =

- Location within California Location within the United States

Highest point
- Elevation: 268 m (879 ft)

Geography
- Country: United States
- State: California
- District: Colusa County
- Range coordinates: 39°7′14.611″N 122°22′37.922″W
- Topo map: USGS Wilbur Springs

The Oat Hills are a mountain range in Colusa County, California.
