= Buena Vista Hills (San Diego County) =

Mountain range in southern California

- Location within California Location within the United States

Highest point
- Elevation: 166 m (545 ft)

Geography
- Country: United States
- State: California
- Region: Peninsular Ranges
- District: San Diego County
- Range coordinates: 33°12′52.131″N 117°14′2.127″W
- Topo map: USGS San Marcos

The Buena Vista Hills are a low mountain range in the Peninsular Ranges System, in western San Diego County, California.

They are located in the San Marcos region of the county.
