= Last Chance Range =

Mountain range in Inyo County, California, United States

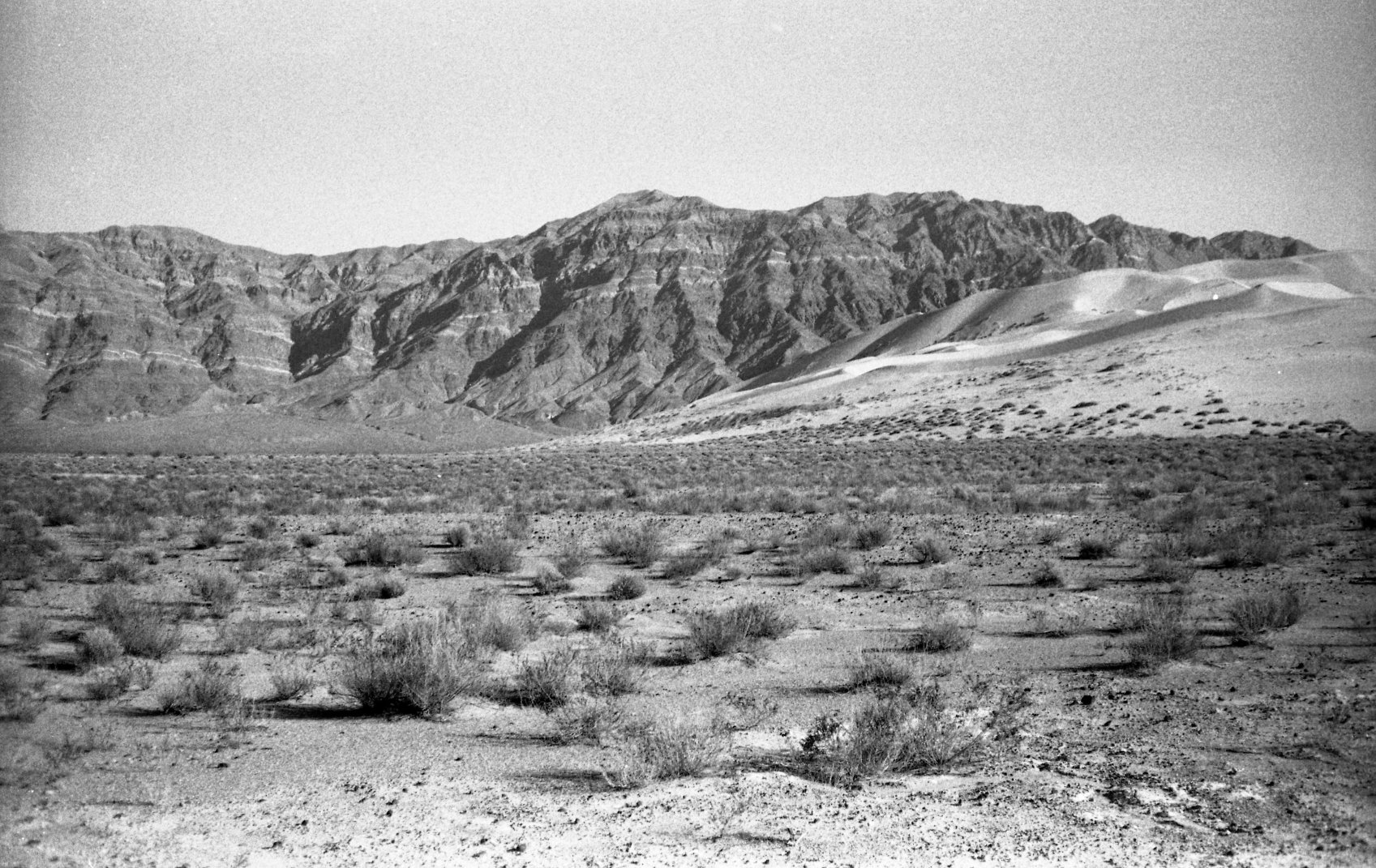
- Northern Last Chance Range from Eureka Dunes

Highest point
- Elevation: 2,645 m (8,678 ft)

Geography
- Location within California
- Country: United States
- State: California
- District: Inyo County
- Range coordinates: 36°54′31.765″N 117°35′52.264″W
- Topo map: USGS Dry Mountain

The Last Chance Range of California is located near the Nevada state line in eastern Inyo County in the United States.

The range lies in a generally north–south direction, and stretches for more than 30 miles. The mountains lie to the northwest of the Cottonwood Mountains, and are almost entirely within Death Valley National Park, except for a small area near the Sulphur Mine in the north. The range reaches an elevation of 8,674 feet above sea level at Dry Mountain in the southern part of the range.

The Racetrack Playa is to the southwest.
