= Cottonwood Mountains (Inyo County) =

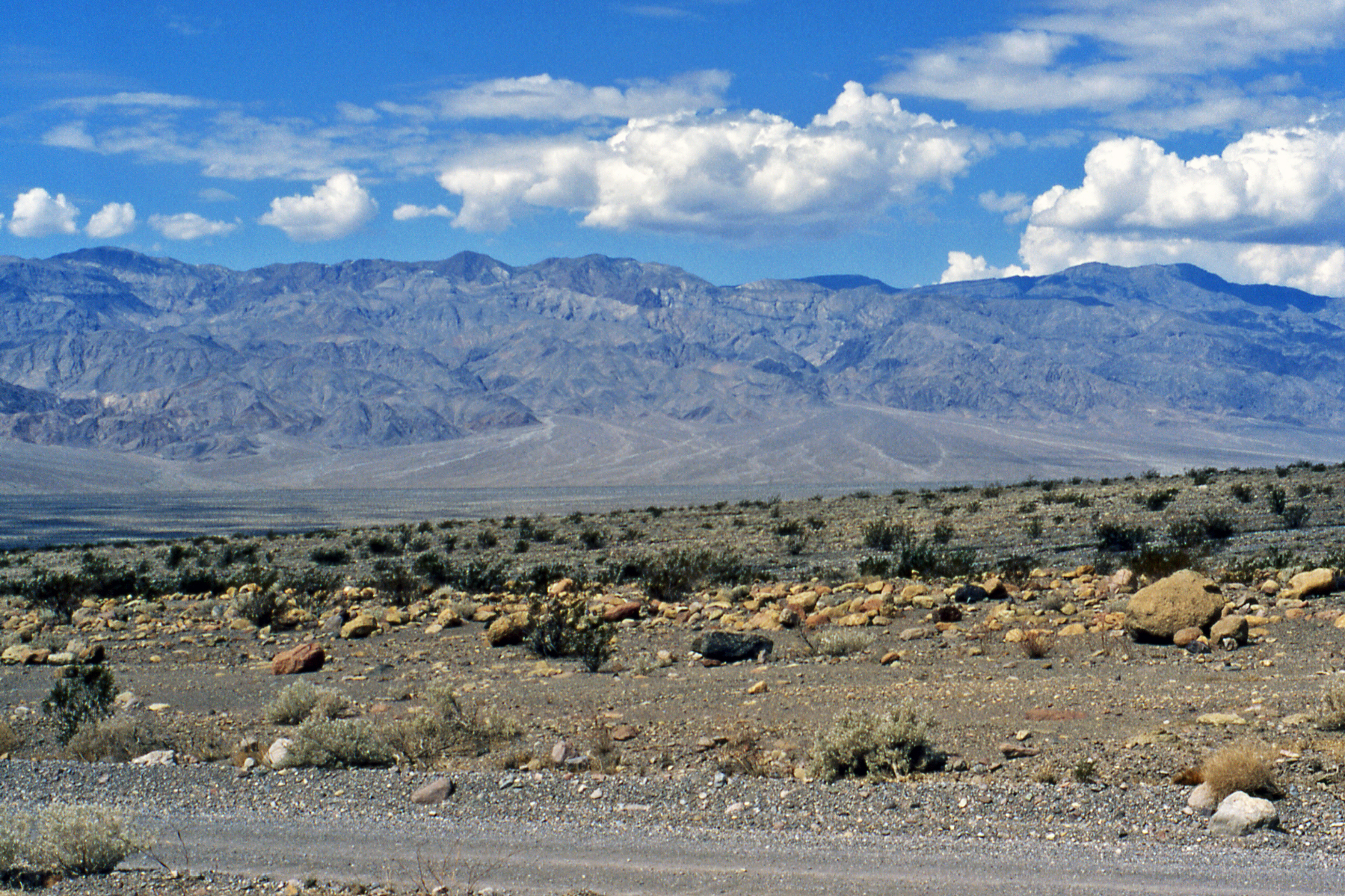
- Cottonwood Mountains from a distance (White Top Mountain at far left)

Highest point
- Elevation: 2,729 m (8,953 ft)

Geography
- Location within California Location within the United States
- Country: United States
- State: California
- District: Inyo County
- Range coordinates: 36°27′43.794″N 117°19′38.231″W
- Topo map: USGS Panamint Butte

The Cottonwood Mountains range is found in Death Valley National Park in Inyo County, California, U.S.

The range lies just to the northwest of the Panamint Mountains at the top of Death Valley, and run in a north–south direction.

Tin Mountain, at the northern end of the range, reaches an elevation of 2,729 meters. At the southern end of the range is Towne Pass, at 1,511 meters. The Last Chance Range is to the east.

== See also ==
- Racetrack Playa
- Ubehebe Crater
- Geology of the Death Valley area
- White Top Mountain (California)

There is another small range with the same name east of Indio, California.
