= Places of interest in the Death Valley area =

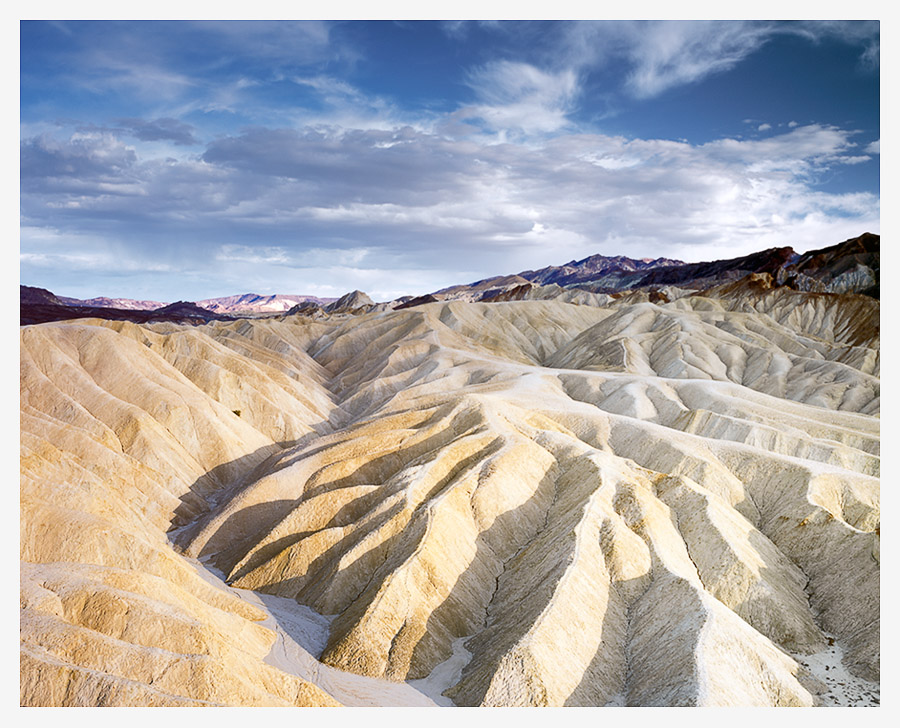
A view from Zabriskie Point

Places of interest in the Death Valley area are mostly located within Death Valley National Park in eastern California.

== Aguereberry Point ==
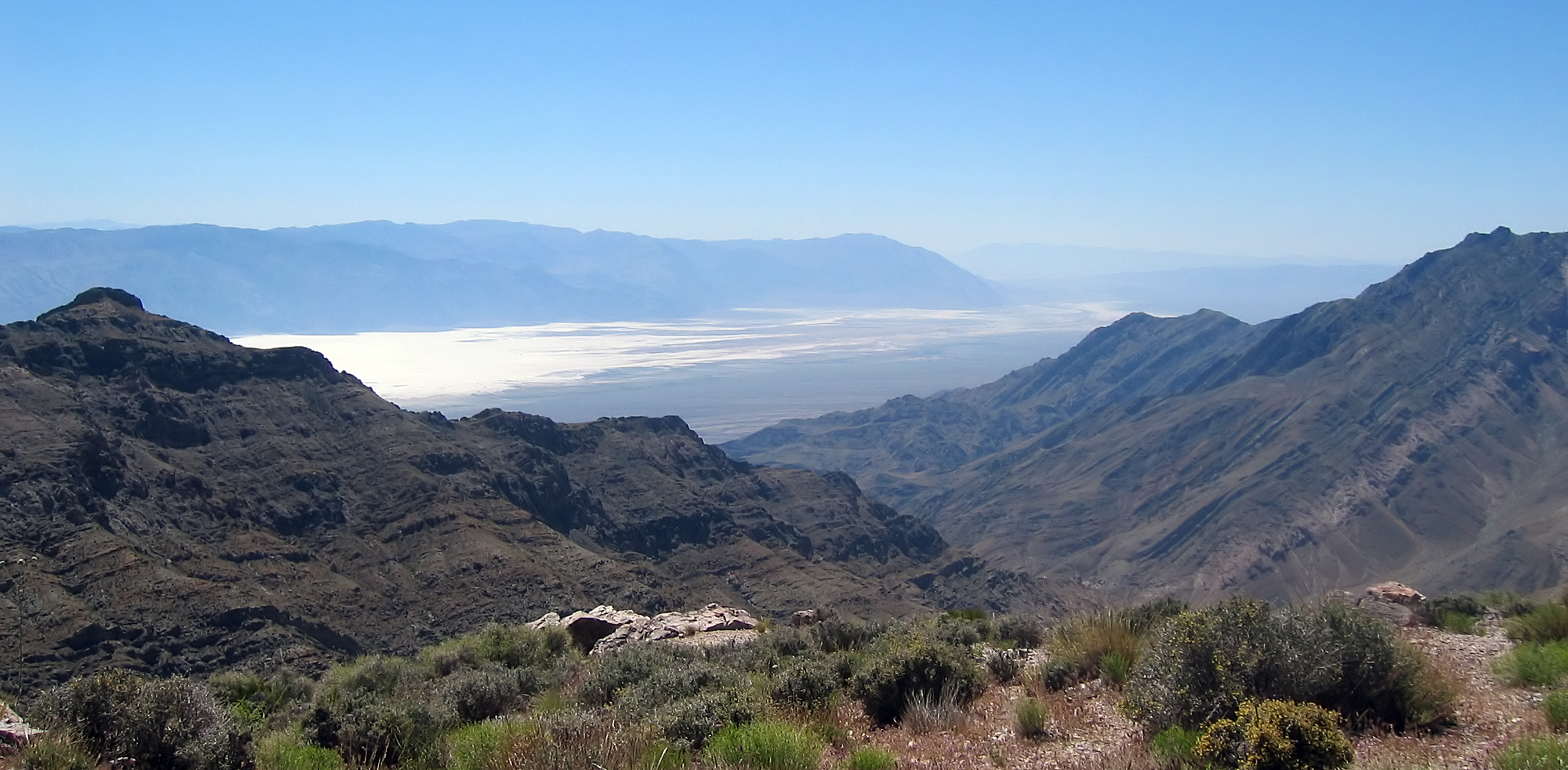
Badwater Basin from Aguereberry Point

Aguereberry Point /ˈæɡərˌbɛri/ is a promontory and tourist viewpoint in the Panamint Range, within Death Valley National Park in Inyo County, eastern California.

The point's elevation reaches 6,433 ft and is named for Jean Pierre "Pete" Aguereberry, a Basque miner who was born in 1874, emigrated from France in 1890, and lived at and worked the nearby Eureka Mine from 1905 to his death in 1945.

From this viewpoint, one can see the surrounding Panamint Range extending to the north and south; Death Valley to the east, with Furnace Creek and the salt flats of Badwater Basin to the southeast; and Mount Charleston in Nevada far to the east.

== Amargosa Chaos ==
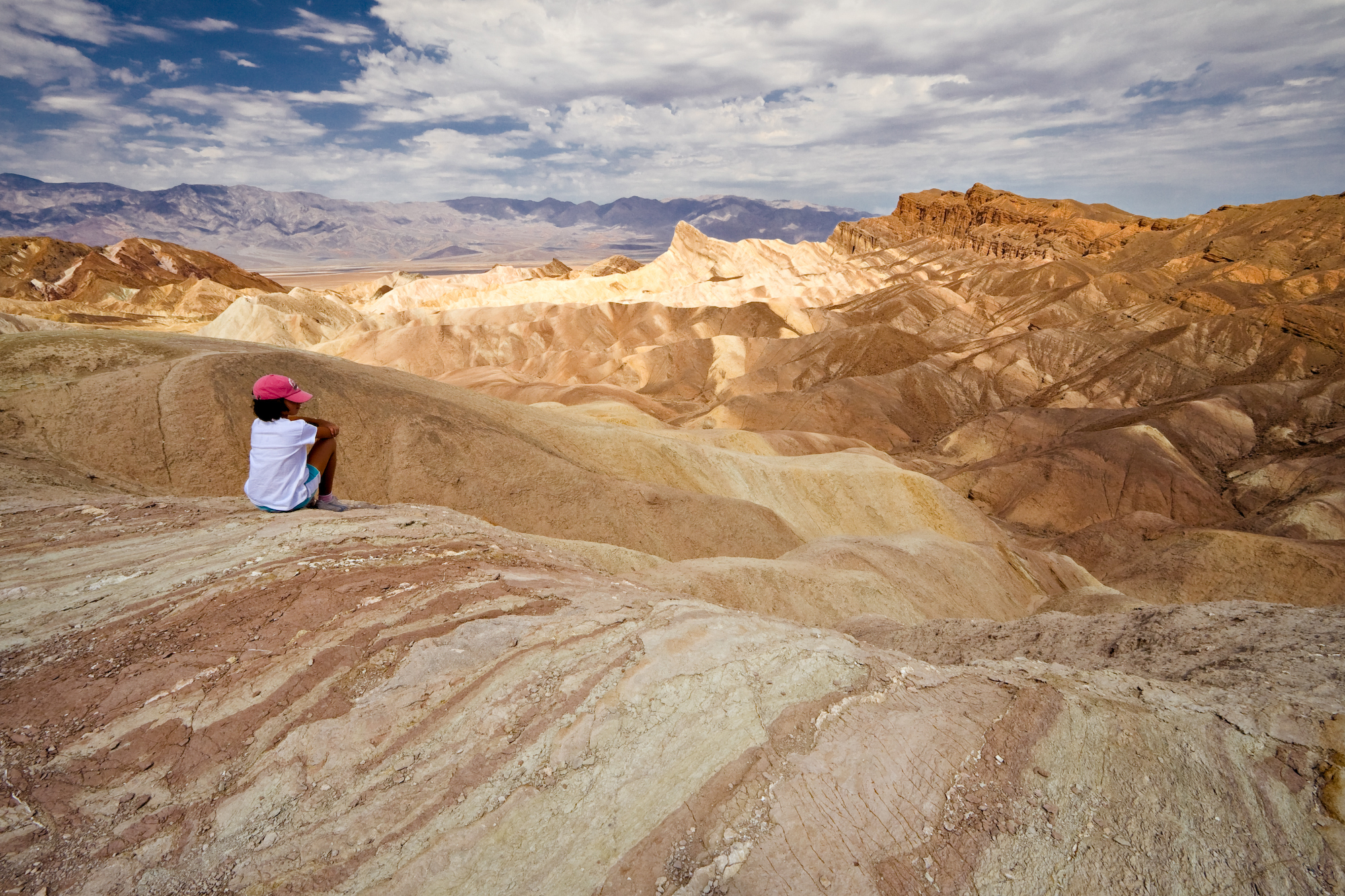
Manly Beacon and Red Cathedral viewed from Zabriskie Point

The Amargosa Chaos is a series of geological formations located in the Black Mountains in southern Death Valley. In the 1930s, geologist Levi F. Noble studied the faulting and folding in the area, dubbing it the "Amargosa chaos" due to the extreme warping of the rock. Later researchers discovered that the region had experienced substantial tension that pulled large blocks of crust apart.

Modern geologists have documented four major deformational events that faulted and folded the Amargosa Chaos. The first event metamorphosed Death Valley's Precambrian basement rocks and occurred around 1,700 million years ago.

The second event began while layered younger Precambrian sediments were being deposited on top of the beveled surface of older metamorphic basement rocks. This deformational event shifted the crust vertically, creating thinning and thickening of some sedimentary layers as they were being deposited.

The two events responsible for the chaotic appearance of the Amargosa Chaos did not occur until over half a billion years later, during Mesozoic or Early Tertiary time. This third event folded the layered Precambrian and Cambrian sedimentary rocks.

The fourth and final event occurred quite recently, geologically speaking. This phase of deformation coincided with severe crustal stretching that created the deep valleys and high mountains of this part of the Basin and Range Province. In just a few million years, during Late Miocene to Pliocene time, older rocks were intensely faulted and sheared. In some areas all that remains of some thick rock layers are lens-shaped pods of rock bounded on all sides by faults. Other layers have been sliced out of their original sequence altogether.

== Artist's Drive and Palette ==
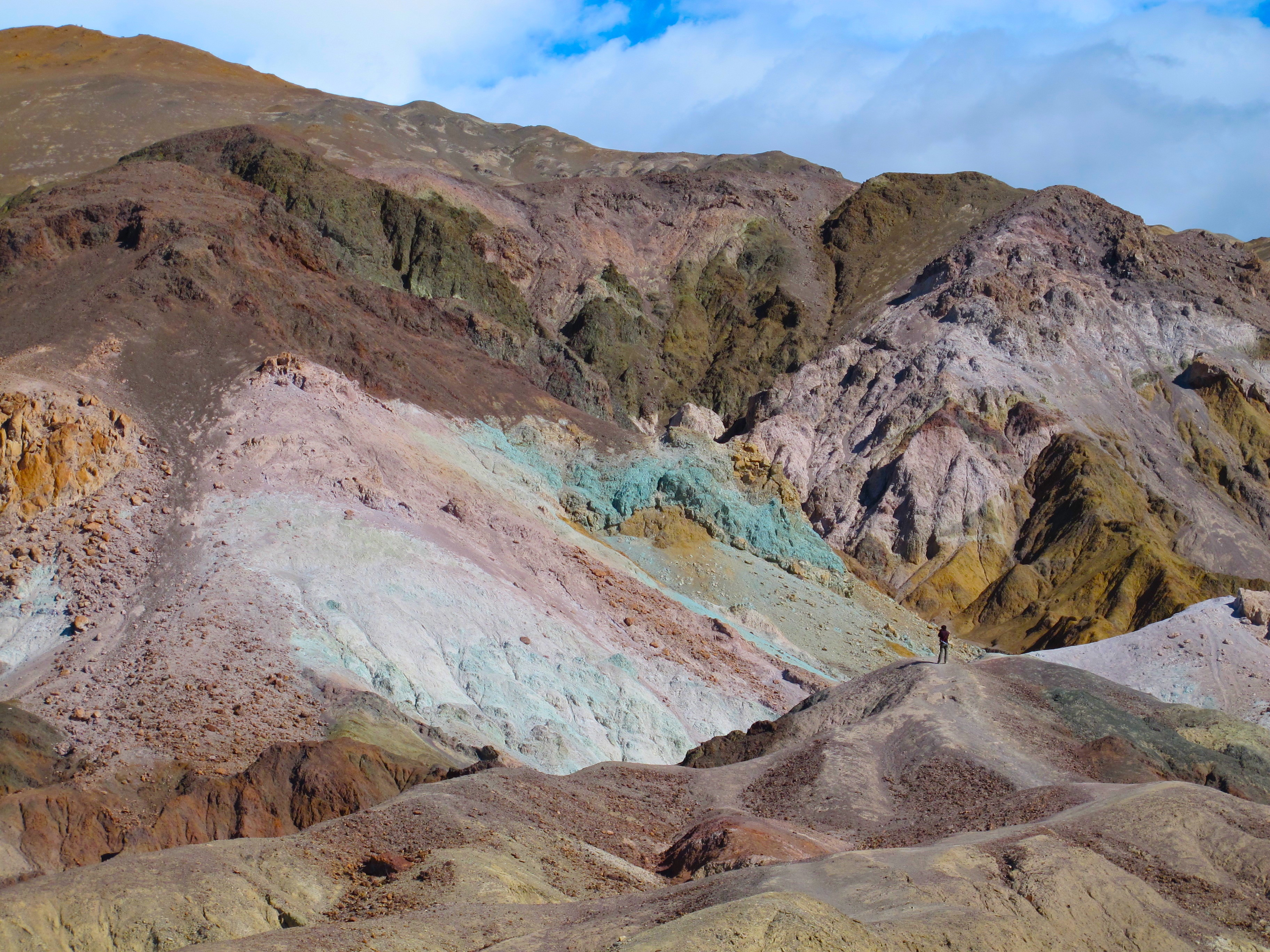
Artist's Palette

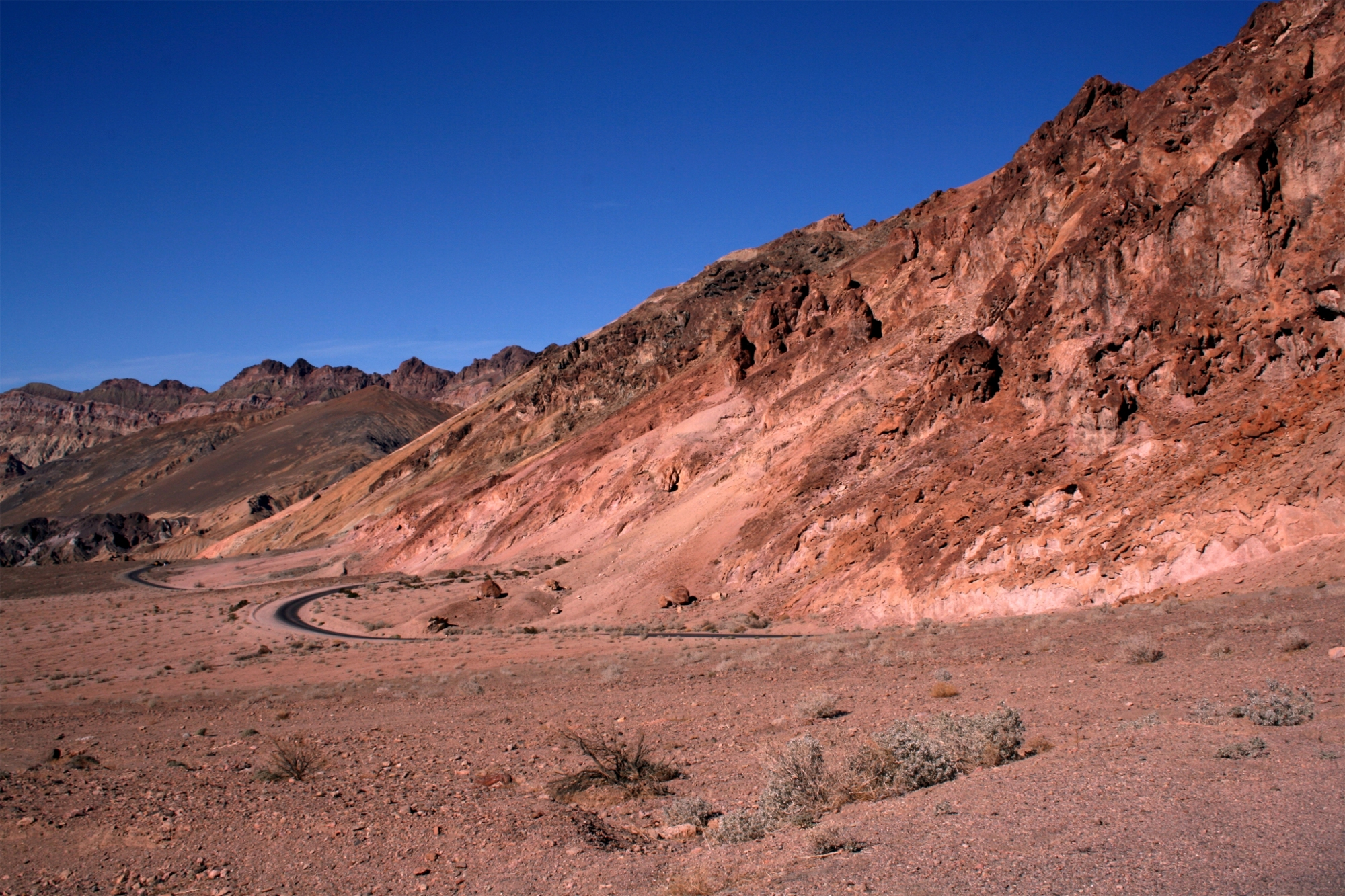
Artist's Drive

Artist's Drive rises up to the top of an alluvial fan fed by a deep canyon cut into the Black Mountains. Artist's Palette is an area on the face of the Black Mountains noted for a variety of rock colors. These colors are caused by the oxidation of different metals (iron compounds produce red, pink and yellow, decomposition of tuff-derived mica produces green, and manganese produces purple).

Called the Artist Drive Formation, the rock unit provides evidence for one of the Death Valley area's most violently explosive volcanic periods. The Miocene-aged formation is made up of cemented gravel, playa deposits, and volcanic debris, perhaps 5,000 feet (1,500 m) thick. Chemical weathering and hydrothermal alteration cause the oxidation and other chemical reactions that produce the variety of colors displayed in the Artist Drive Formation and nearby exposures of the Furnace Creek Formation.

== Badwater Basin ==
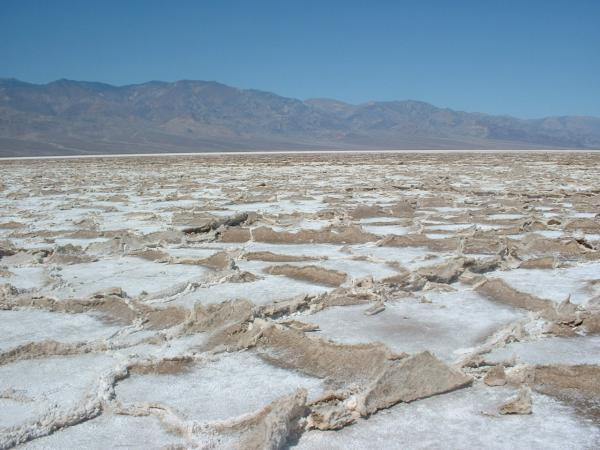
This picture shows hexagonal saucers in Badwater Basin that are approximately 2 – 2.5 metres in diameter. These are part of larger-scale features that are also hexagonally-shaped and can be seen from Dante's View nearly 6,000 feet (1,800 m) above. The saucers are formed after the salty pan begins to dry and the salt crystals expand.

The Badwater Basin is a salt flat adjacent to the Black Mountains that descends to the lowest elevation in North America at 282 feet (86 m) below sea level. The massive expanse of white is made up of almost pure table salt. The basin is the second lowest depression in the Western Hemisphere, eclipsed only by Laguna del Carbón in Argentina at −344 feet (−105 m).

This pan was first created by the drying-up of 30-foot (9.1 m) deep Recent Lake 2000 to 3000 years ago. Unlike at the Devils Golf Course, significant rainstorms flood Badwater, covering the salt pan with a thin sheet of standing water. Each newly formed lake doesn't last long though, because the 1.9 inches (48 mm) average rainfall is overwhelmed by a 150-inch (3,800 mm) annual evaporation rate. This, the nation's greatest evaporation potential, means that even a 12-foot (3.7 m) deep, 30 miles (48 km) long lake would dry up in a single year. While flooded, some of the salt is dissolved, then is redeposited as clean, sparkling crystals when the water evaporates.

== Charcoal Kilns ==
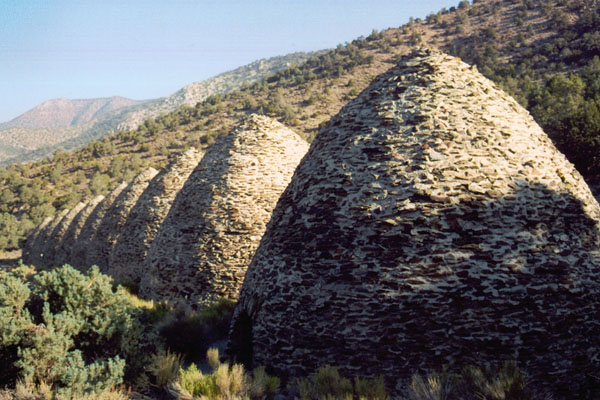
Charcoal Kilns, Panamint Range, Death Valley National Park

The Wildrose Charcoal Kilns were completed in 1877 by the Modock Consolidated Mining Company, above Death Valley in the Panamint Range, and were used to reduce pinyon and juniper tree wood to charcoal in a process of slow burning in low oxygen. This fuel was then transported to mines in The Argus Range, 25 miles to the west, to feed smelting and ore extraction operations.

Although the mines themselves were worked intermittently until about 1900, there is no clear evidence that the charcoal kilns were operational after 1879. They were restored by Navajo Indian stonemasons from Arizona in 1971.

The kilns were located here as the trees single-leaf pinyon pine (Pinus monophylla) and Utah juniper (Juniperus osteosperma) dominate the landscape in the upper Panamint Mountains. Shrubs of Mormon tea (Ephedra sp.), such as Death Valley ephedra (Ephedra funerea), are spaced between them, with other xeric sub-shrubs and native bunchgrasses.

Other historic charcoal kilns in the United States include the Ward Charcoal Ovens in Nevada, the Piedmont Charcoal Kilns in Wyoming, the Cottonwood Charcoal Kilns at Owens Lake, CA, and the Walker Charcoal Kiln in Arizona.

Wildrose Canyon has two campgrounds above the kilns, Thorndyke at 7,490 feet and Mahogany Flat at 7923 feet. The latter is the trail head for the hiking trail to Telescope Peak and has views to the east down to Badwater.

== Dante's View ==
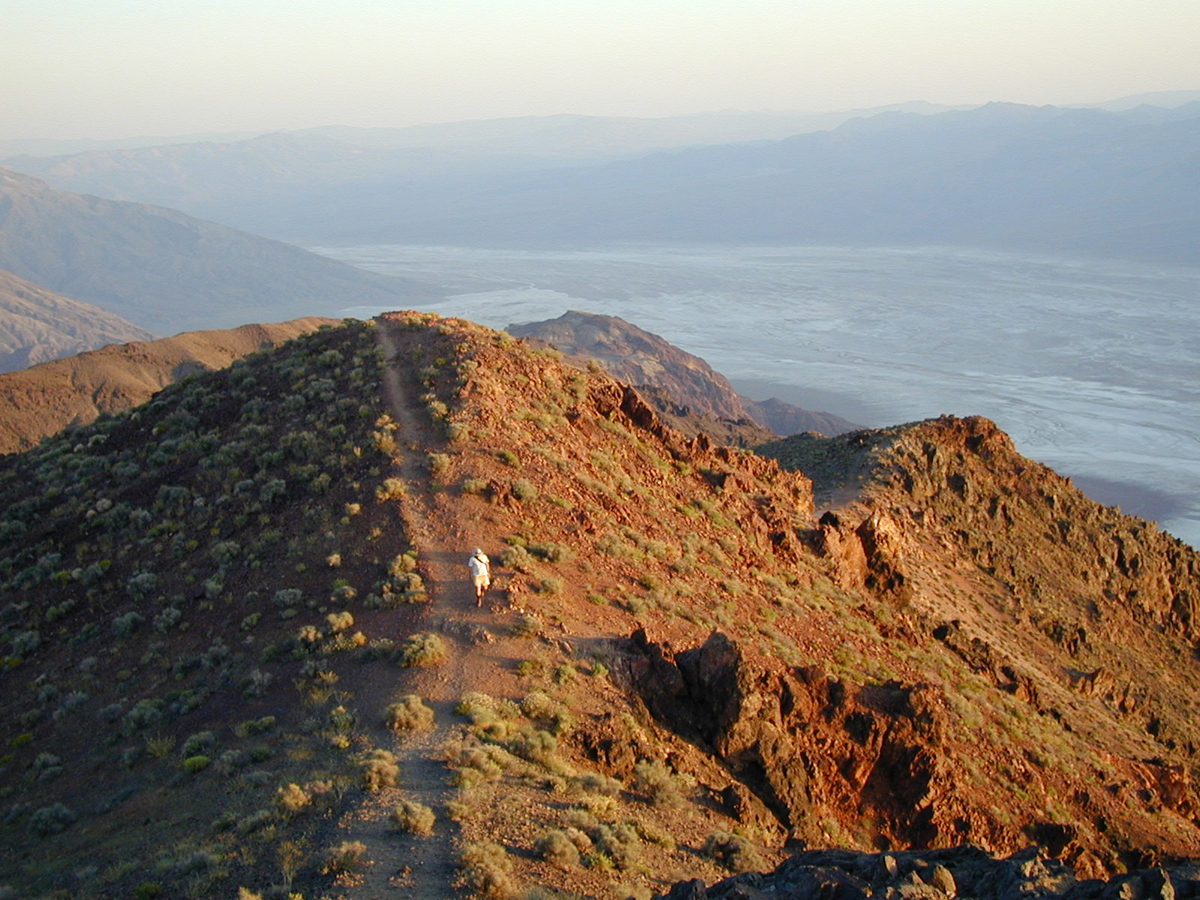
Dante's View with Badwater Basin in the background

Dante's View overlooks the central part of Death Valley from a vantage point of 5,500 feet (1,700 m) above sea level. Badwater Basin is visible, which contains the lowest dry point in North America. Telescope Peak can also be seen from here which is 11,331 feet (3,454 m) above sea level. This is the greatest topographic relief in the conterminous U.S.

The mountain that Dante's View is on is part of the Black Mountains which along with the parallel Panamint Range across the valley from what geologists call a horst and the valley that is called a graben. These structures are created when the surface of the earth is under extensional, or a pulling force. The crust responds to this force by sending a large and long roughly v-shaped block of crust down which forms the bedrock of the valley floor (see Basin and Range).

== Darwin Falls ==
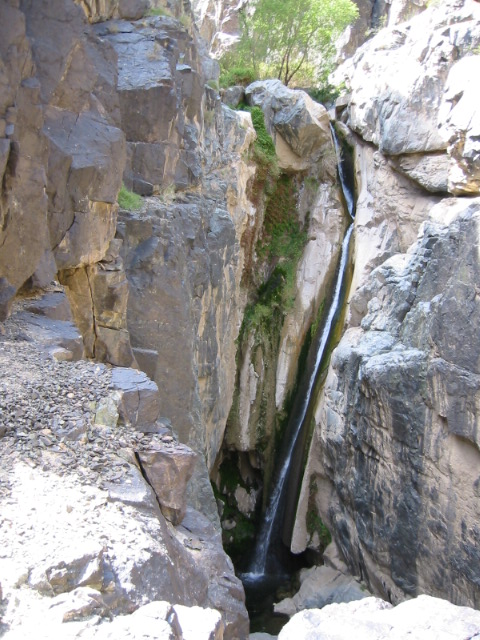
Upper Darwin Falls viewed from the access ledges

Darwin Falls is a waterfall located on the western edge of Death Valley National Park near the settlement of Panamint Springs, California. There are several falls, but they are mainly divided into the upper and lower with a small grotto in between. The small, narrow valley where the creek and falls are located features a rare collection of riparian greenery in the vast desert and is home to indigenous fauna such as quail. The falls themselves support several small fern gullys.

== Devil's Golf Course ==
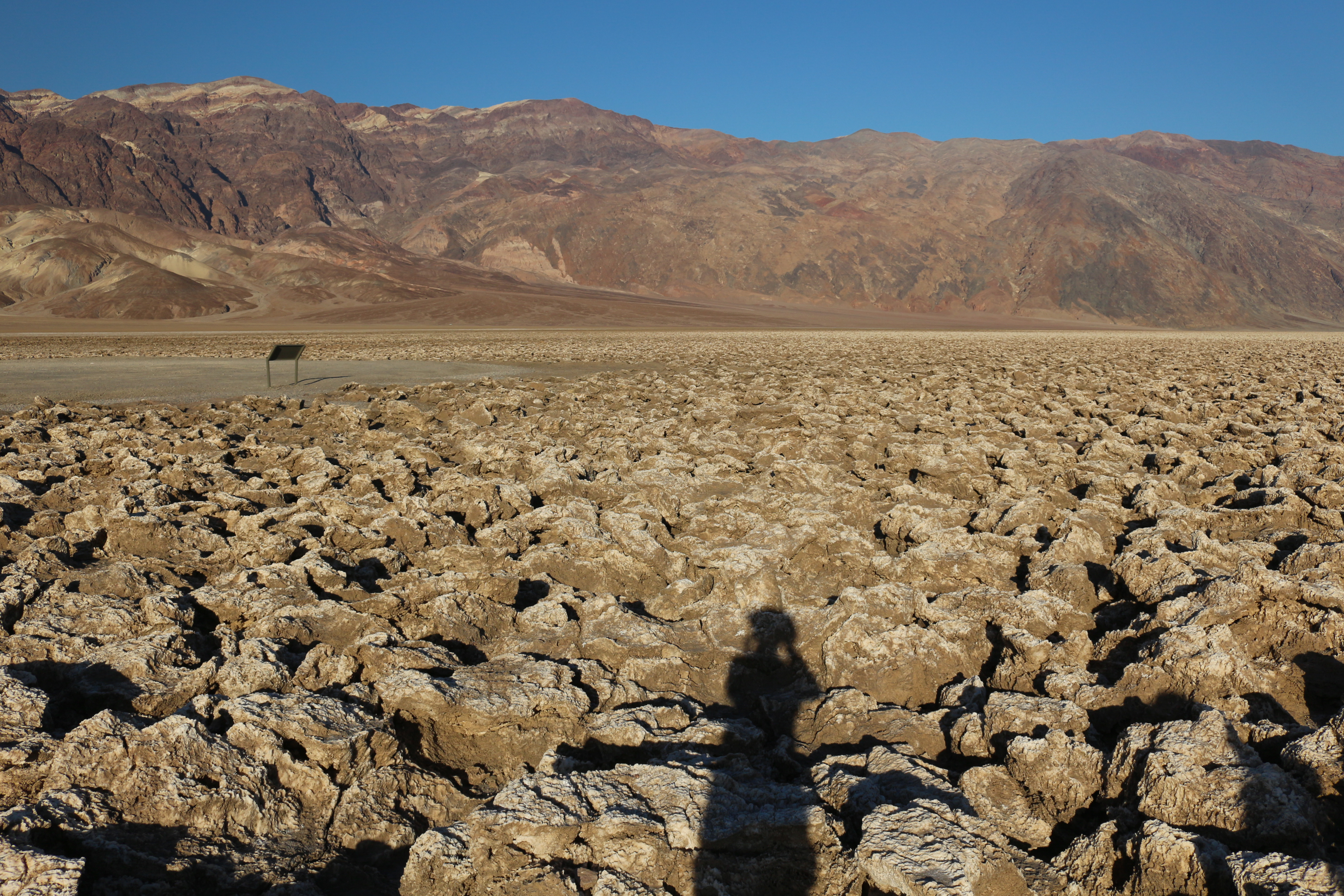
Devil's Golf Course

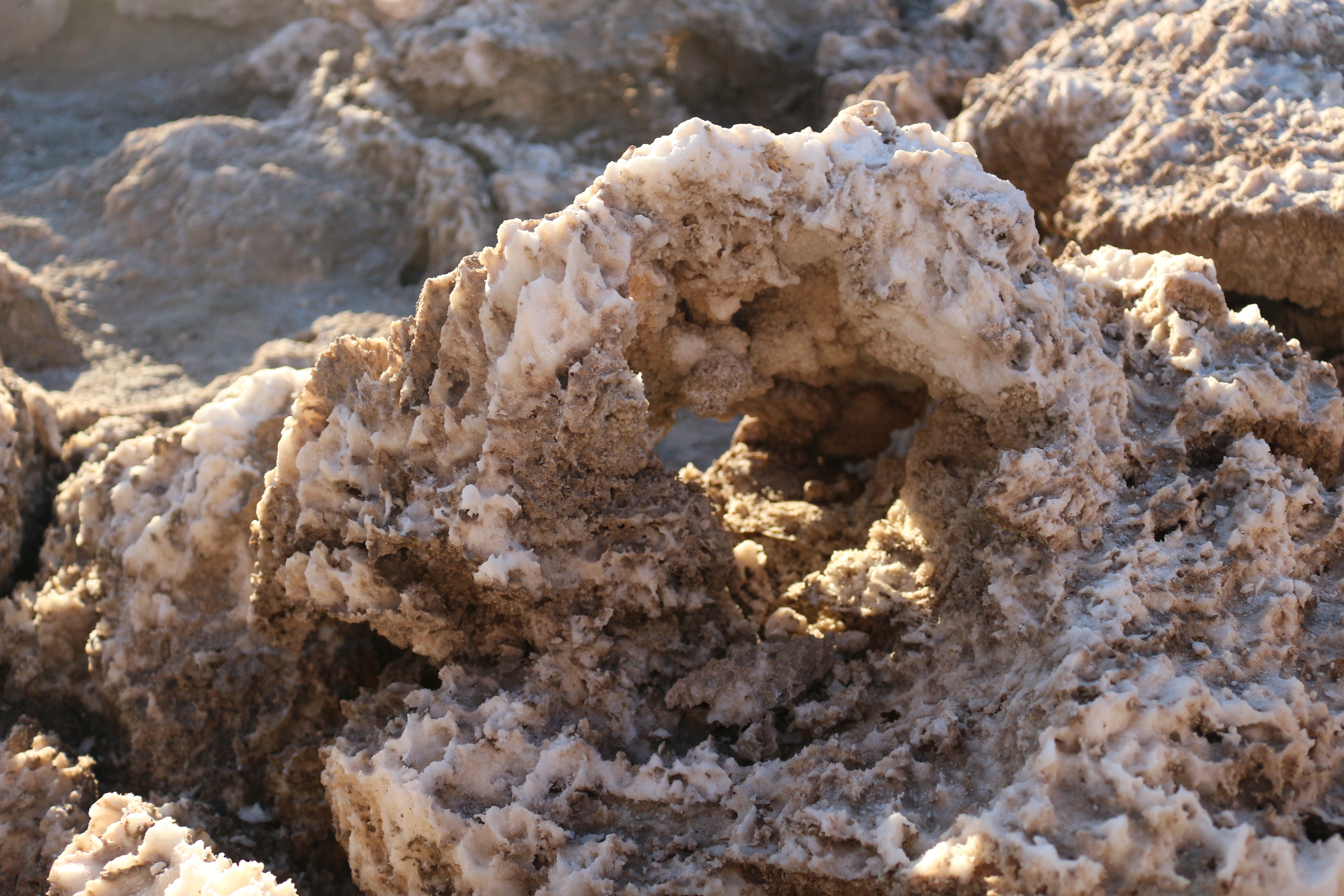
Detail of a salt-covered rock, Devil's Golf Course

The Devil's Golf Course is a large salt pan on the floor of Death Valley. It was named after a line in the 1934 National Park Service guide book to Death Valley National Monument, which stated that "Only the devil could play golf" on its surface, due to a rough texture from the large halite salt crystal formations.

Lake Manly once covered the valley to a depth of 30 feet (9.1 m). The salt in the Devil's Golf Course consists of the minerals that were dissolved in the lake's water and left behind in the Badwater Basin when the lake evaporated. With an elevation several feet above the valley floor at Badwater, the Devil's Golf Course remains dry, allowing weathering processes to sculpt the salt there into complicated formations.

Through exploratory holes drilled by the Pacific Coast Borax Company, prior to Death Valley becoming a national monument in 1934, it was discovered that the salt and gravel beds of the Devil's Golf Course extend to a depth of more than 1,000 feet (300 m). Later studies suggest that in places the depth ranges up to 9,000 feet (2,700 m).

Devil's Golf Course can be reached from Badwater Road via a 1.3-mile (2.1 km) gravel drive, closed in wet weather. It should not be confused with an actual golf course in Furnace Creek, also in Death Valley.

== Eureka Valley and Sand Dunes ==
Between the Last Chance Range and Saline Mountains is the graben Eureka Valley. Sand dunes cover 3 square miles (8 km^{2}) of Eureka Valley, rising 680 feet (207 m) as one of North America's tallest dunes. As sand moves down the dune face it produces a booming noise, known as singing sand phenomenon, due to the small grain size and loose, dry packing. Endemic species include the Eureka Dune Grass, the Eureka Dunes evening primrose and the Shining Locoweed.

== Furnace Creek ==
Furnace Creek is a spring, oasis, and village that sits on top of a remarkably symmetrical alluvial fan. The main visitor center of the park is located here as well as the Oasis at Death Valley resort complex. Controversy surrounds the use of Furnace Creek water to support the resort (complete with a swimming pool) and nearby facilities, including a golf course. The scarce springs and surrounding lush oases support thriving plant communities and attract a wide variety of animals. As the resort grew, the marshes and wetlands around it shrank.

The highest temperature in North America was recorded at Furnace Creek Ranch (134 °F or 57 °C).

The Furnace Creek Fault runs through this part of Death Valley.

== Hells Gate ==
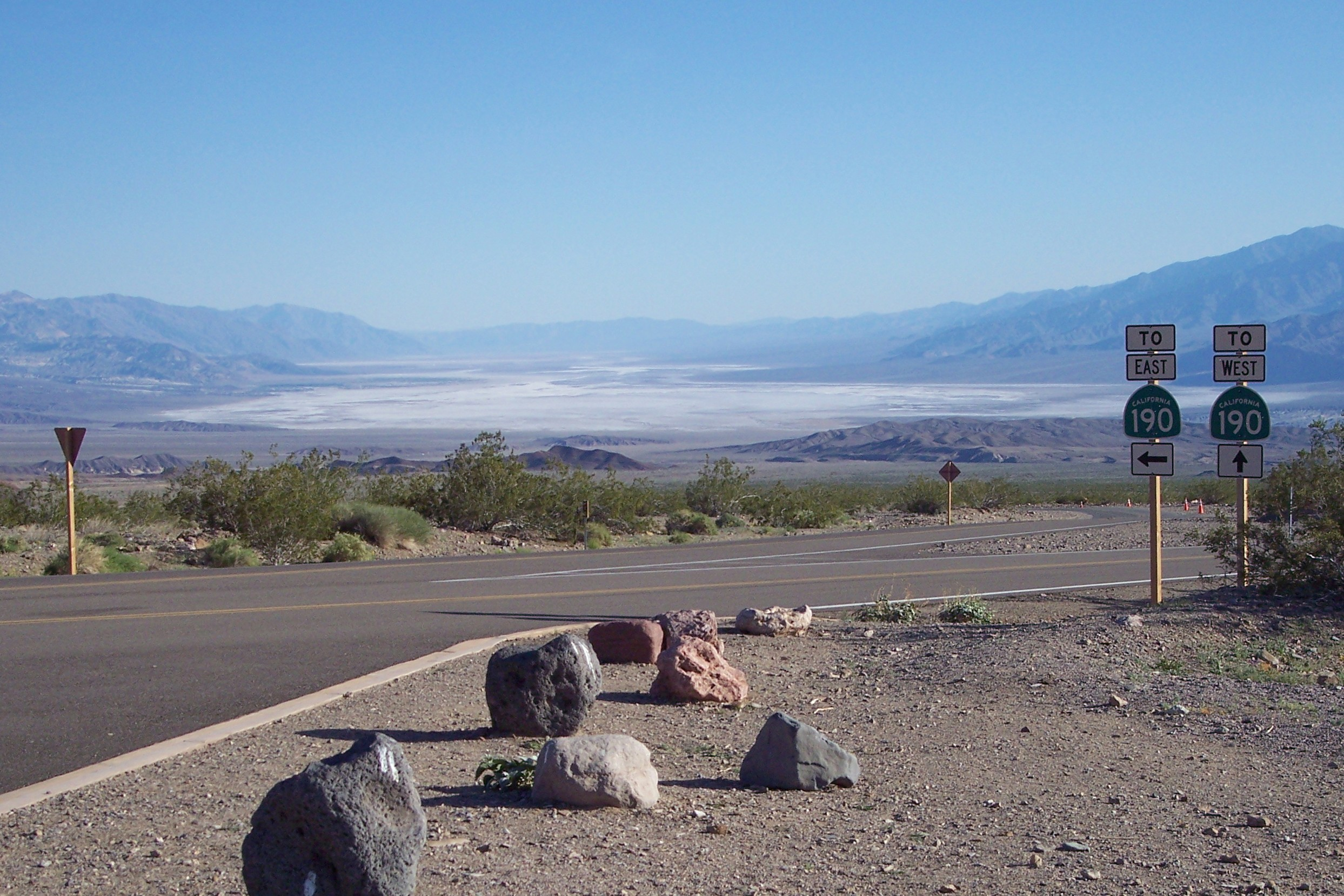
Death Valley seen from Hells Gate

Hells Gate is a point of interest located in Death Valley National Park, at the intersection of Daylight Pass Road and Beatty Road. There is a parking area and hiking paths.

== Mesquite Flat Sand Dunes ==
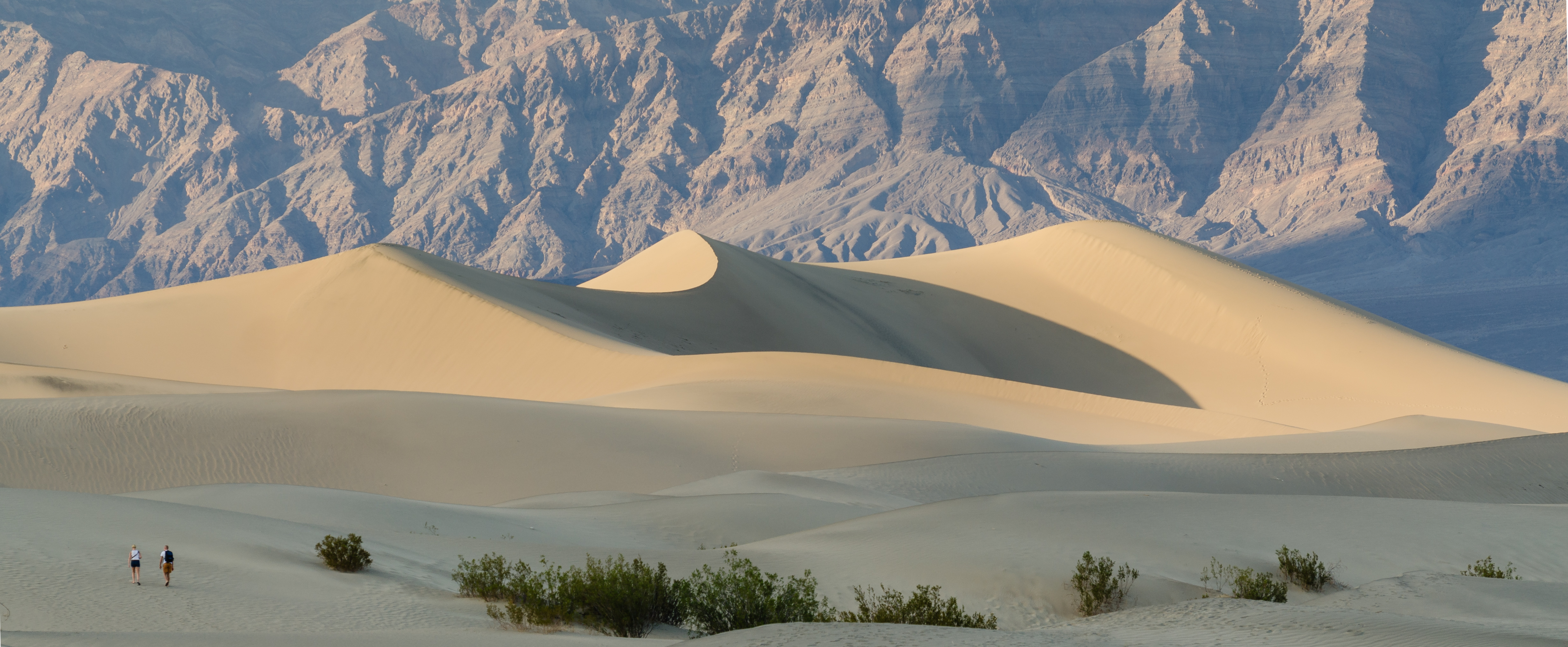
Mesquite Flat Sand Dunes

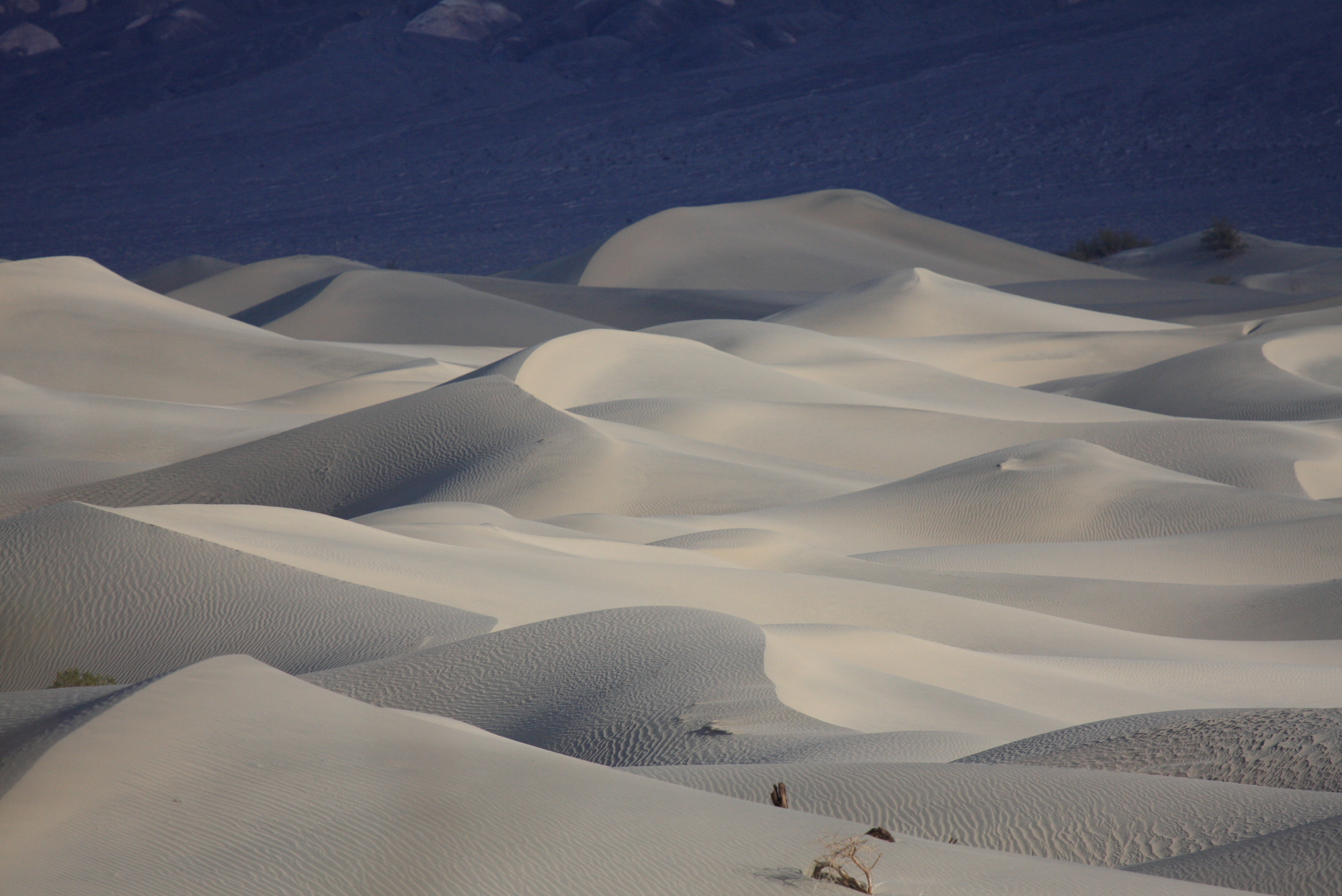
Mesquite Flat Sand Dunes

The Mesquite Flat Sand Dunes are at the northern end of the valley floor and are nearly surrounded by mountains on all sides. Due to their easy access from the road and the overall proximity of Death Valley to Hollywood, these dunes have been used to film sand dune scenes for several movies including films in the Star Wars series. The largest dune is called Star Dune and is relatively stable and stationary because it is at a point where the various winds that shape the dunes converge. The depth of the sand at its crest is 130–140 feet (40–43 metres) but this is small compared to other dunes in the area that have sand depths of up to 600–700 feet (180–210 metres) deep.

The primary source of the dune sands is probably the Cottonwood Mountains which lie to the north and northwest. The tiny grains of quartz and feldspar that form the sinuous sculptures that make up this dune field began as much larger pieces of solid rock.

In between many of the dunes are stands of creosote bush and some mesquite on the sand and on dried mud, which used to cover this part of the valley before the dunes intruded (mesquite was the dominant plant here before the sand dunes but creosote does much better in the sand dune conditions).

== Mesquite Spring ==
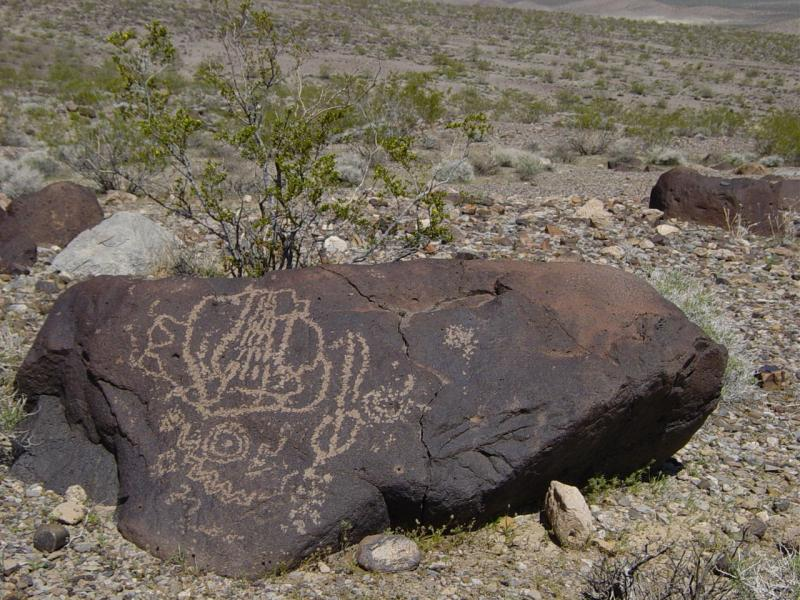
Petroglyphs above Mesquite Spring

Mesquite Spring is located in the northernmost part of Death Valley. This part of the valley has numerous cotton top cactus, blister beetles and cholla cactus. On the alluvial fan above the springs there are 2–3 thousand year old petroglyphs from the extinct Mesquite Spring culture.

The petroglyphs here are made possible because many of the rocks in these arid conditions have desert varnish on them. This particular form of desert varnish takes 10,000 years to make 1/100 of an inch of varnish and is deposited by a certain type of bacteria that collects the iron, manganese and clay needed to make the varnish.

Also, since varnish is created at a predictable rate, it is possible to date petroglyphs based on the amount of re-varnishing that has taken place since the marks were made. Varnish does not normally form on carbonate rocks because their surfaces weather too easily.

In a wash near some of the petroglyphs there is a fault scarp that exposes some fanglomerate which is a type of sedimentary rock which looks like concrete with large rocks intermixed. In fact it is lithified alluvial sediment.

== Mosaic Canyon ==
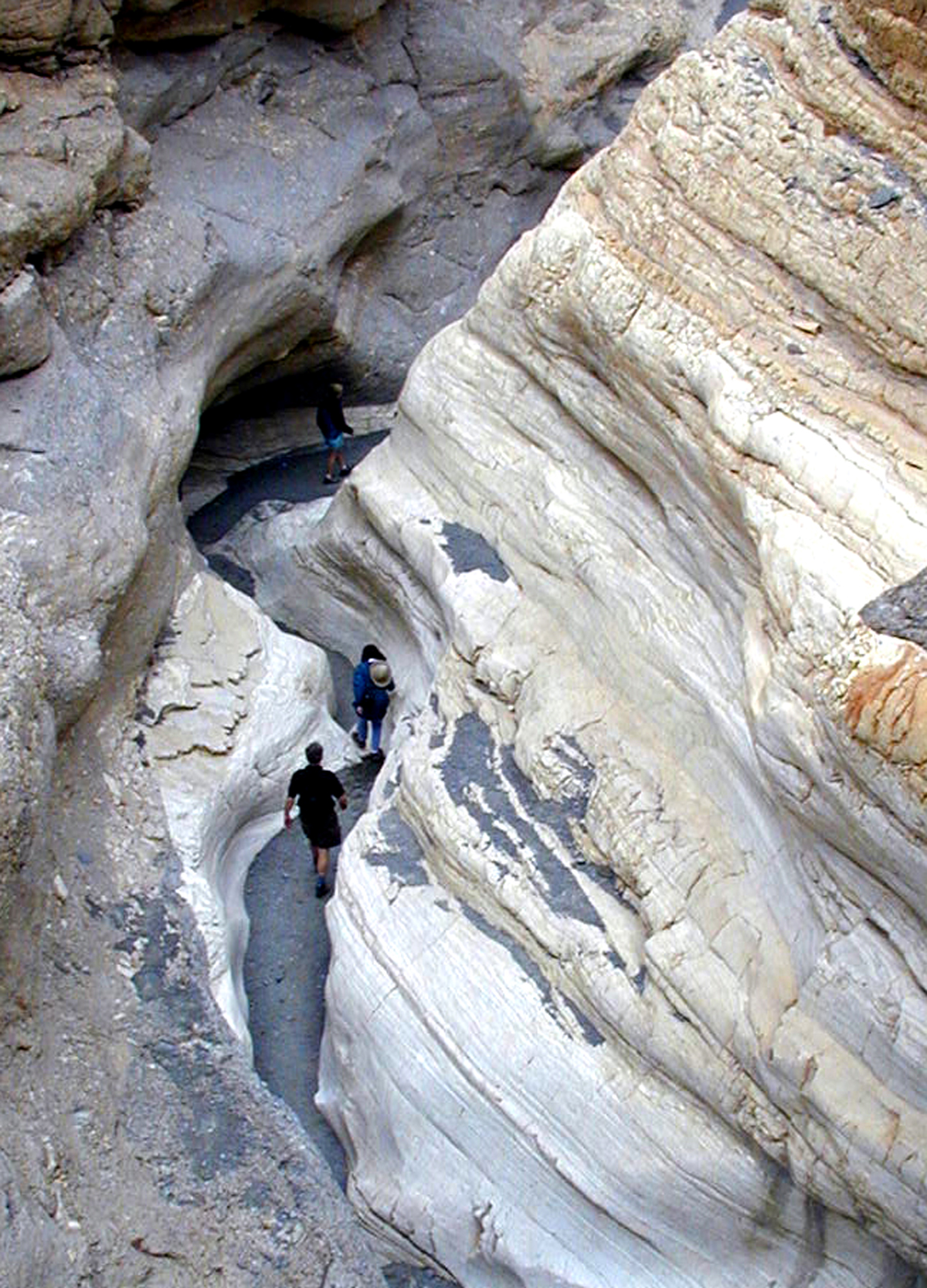
Hikers walk through the narrows of Mosaic Canyon

Mosaic Canyon is a canyon in the north western mountain face of the valley which is named after a stream-derived breccia sediment with angular blocks of dolomite in a pebbly matrix. The entrance to Mosaic Canyon appears deceptively ordinary, but just a 1/4 mile (400 m) walk up the canyon narrows dramatically to a deep slot cut into the face of Tucki Mountain. Smooth, polished marble walls enclose the trail as it follows the canyon's sinuous curves. The canyon follows faults that formed when the rocky crust of the Death Valley region began stretching just a few million years ago. Running water scoured away at the fault-weakened rock, gradually carving Mosaic canyon.

Periodic flash floods carry rocky debris (sediment) eroded from Mosaic Canyon and the surrounding hillsides toward the valley below. At the canyon mouth water spreads out and deposits its sediment load, gradually building up a large wedge-shaped alluvial fan that extends down toward Stovepipe Wells. This canyon was formed through a process of cut and fill which included periodic erosive floods followed by long periods of deposition and uplift. But due to the uplift when the next flood hit the area it would deeply cut the streambed which forms stairstep-shaped banks.

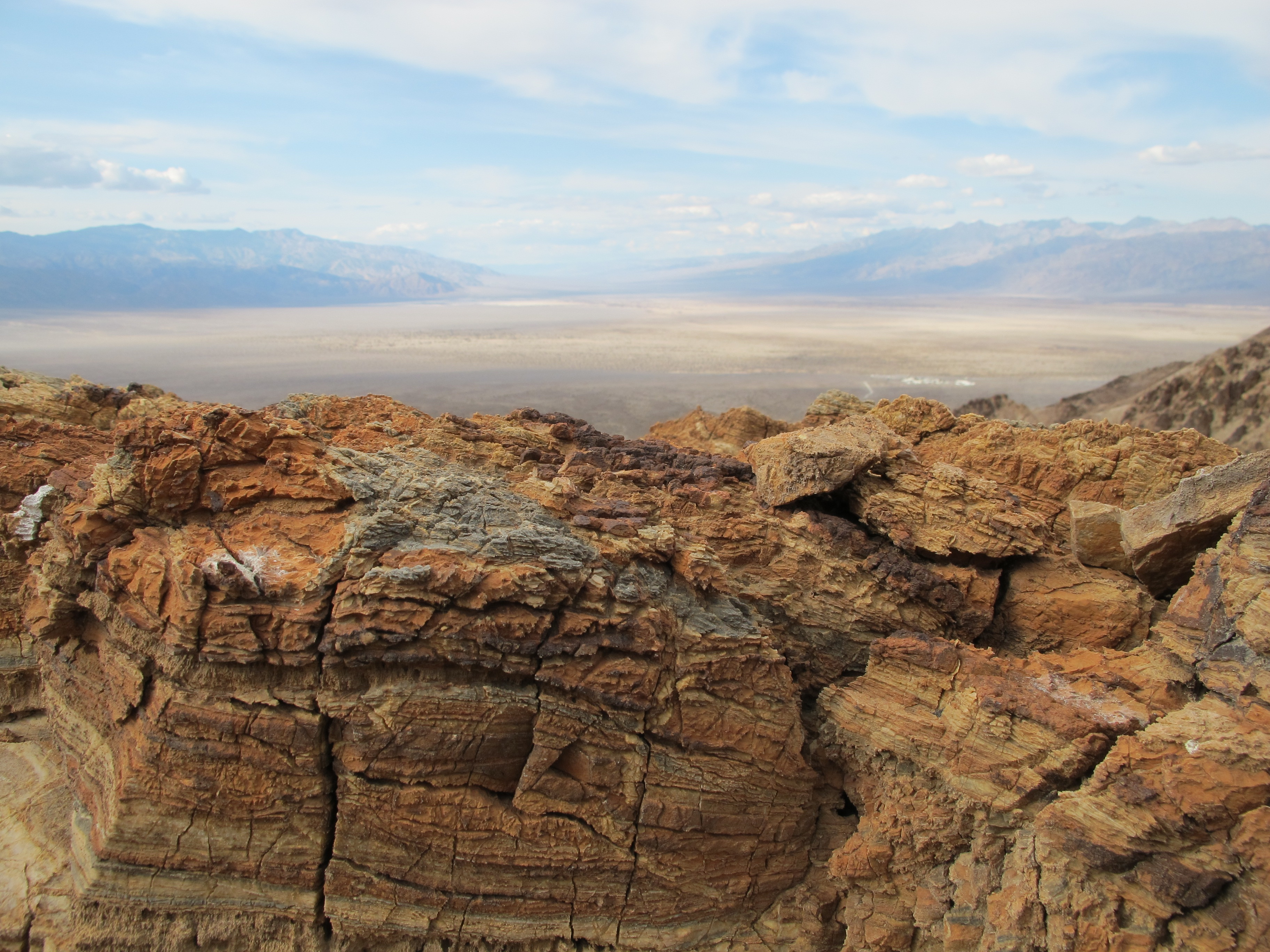
Dolomite promontory at Mosaic Canyon, with view of Death Valley

Mosaic Canyon's polished marble walls are carved from the Noonday Dolomite and other Precambrian carbonate rocks. These rock formation began as limestone deposited during Late Precambrian (about 850–700 million years ago) when the area was covered by a warm sea. Later addition of magnesium changed the limestone, a rock made of calcium carbonate, to dolomite, a calcium-magnesium carbonate. The dolomite was later deeply buried by younger sediment. Far below the surface, high pressure and temperature altered the dolomite into the metamorphic rock, marble. The Noonday Dolomite has since been tilted from uplift.

Mosaic Canyon was named for a rock formation known as the Mosaic Breccia. Breccia is an Italian word meaning gravel. This formation is composed of angular fragments of many different kinds of parent rock, and it can be seen on the floor of the canyon just south of the parking area.

== Natural Bridge Canyon ==
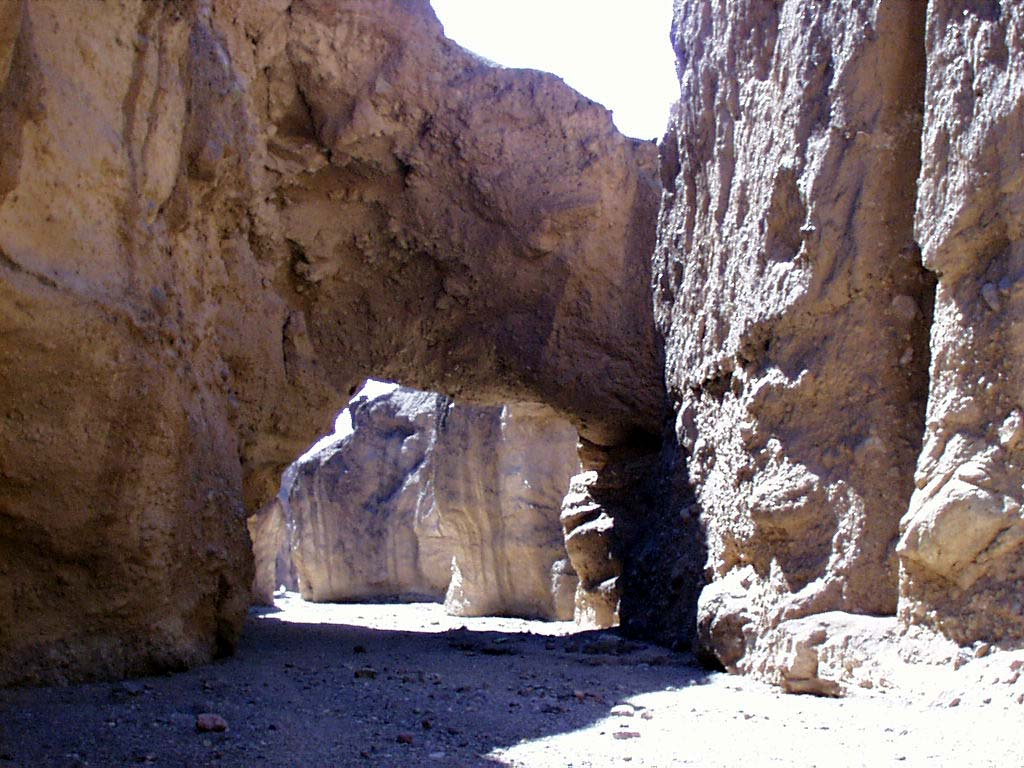
Natural Bridge Canyon

Natural Bridge Canyon is found on the east side of the park and is one of the few canyons with an official trailhead. Located four miles (6.4 km) south of the Artist's Drive scenic loop, the canyon contains a natural stone bridge, accessible after a fifteen-minute walk from the parking area.

== Panamint Valley ==
The Panamint Valley basin runs between the Panamint Range to the east and Argus and Slate ranges to the west for 65 miles (105 km). It has a width of about 10 miles (16 km). It is an endorheic basin that can form a lake after heavy rain. Airspace above the valley is part of the Panamint Military Operating Area, restricted to US military use. The ghost town of Ballarat had 400 residents at the turn of the 20th century when mines were active in the area.

== Racetrack Playa ==
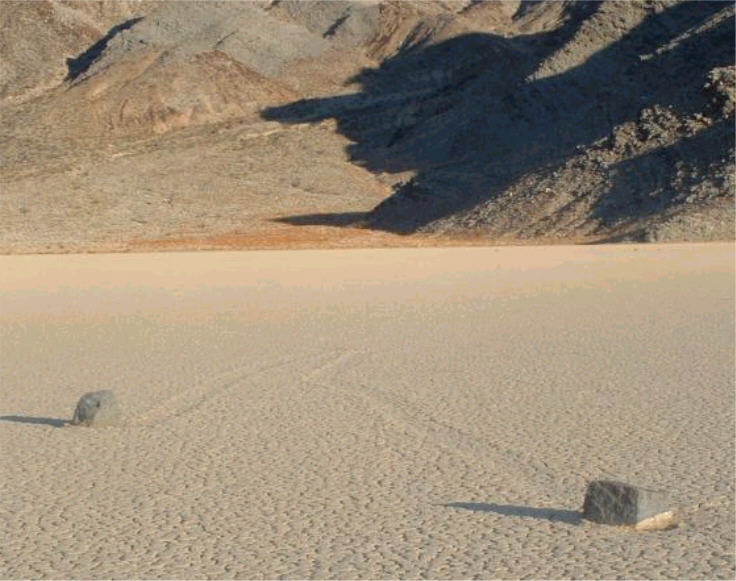
Rocks on Racetrack Playa

Racetrack Playa is a seasonally dry lake (playa) located in the northern part of the Panamint Mountains that is famous for rocks that mysteriously move across its surface. During periods of heavy rain, water washes down from nearby mountain slopes onto the playa, forming a shallow, short-lived lake. Most of the so-called 'sailing stones' are from a nearby high hillside of dark dolomite on the south end of the playa. Similar rock travel patterns have been recorded in several other playas in the region but the number and length of travel grooves on The Racetrack are notable. Racetrack stones only move once every two or three years and most tracks last for just three or four years.

== Rainbow Canyon ==
Rainbow Canyon is a canyon near the western edge of the park. It is commonly used by the United States Military for fighter jet training and is frequented by photographers who, from the canyon rim, are able to photograph jets flying beneath them. Since a 2019 plane crash all military air traffic has been banned from flying below the rim.

== Red Cathedral ==
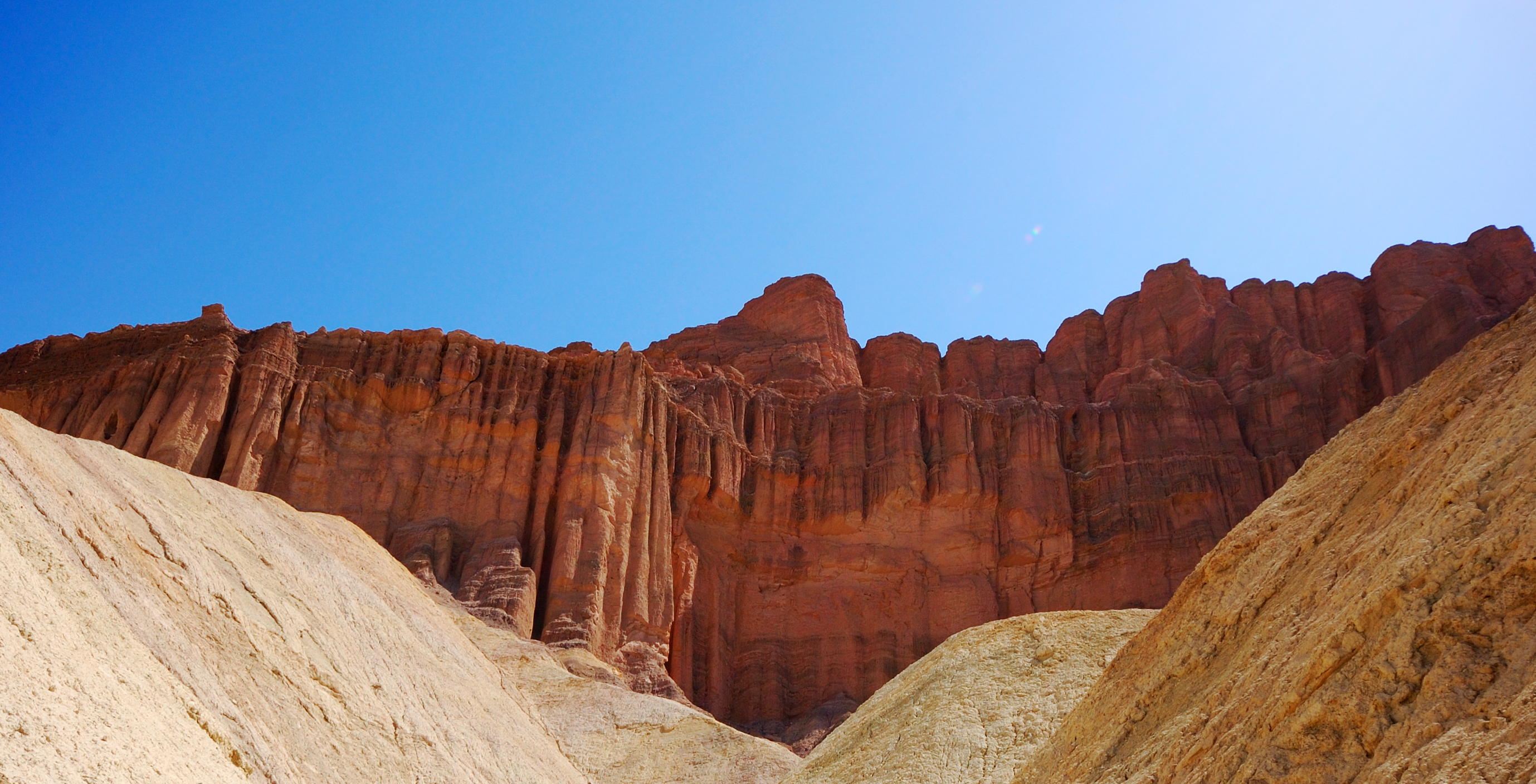
Red Cathedral seen from the Golden Canyon trail

Red Cathedral is a geological formation located between highways 178 and 190. Formed of steep cliffs, it is composed of red colored oxidized rocks and is visible from Zabriskie point and the Golden Canyon trail.

== Salt Creek ==
Much of Salt Creek is usually dry at the surface and covered by a bright layer of salt which was created by many flooding and subsequent evaporation of water that periodically flows at the surface. Over time the small amount of solutes in the water accumulate to form this linear salt pan. Another part of salt creek runs with brackish water year-round. It is here that the last survivor of Lake Manly resides; the Death Valley pupfish.

== Saratoga Springs ==
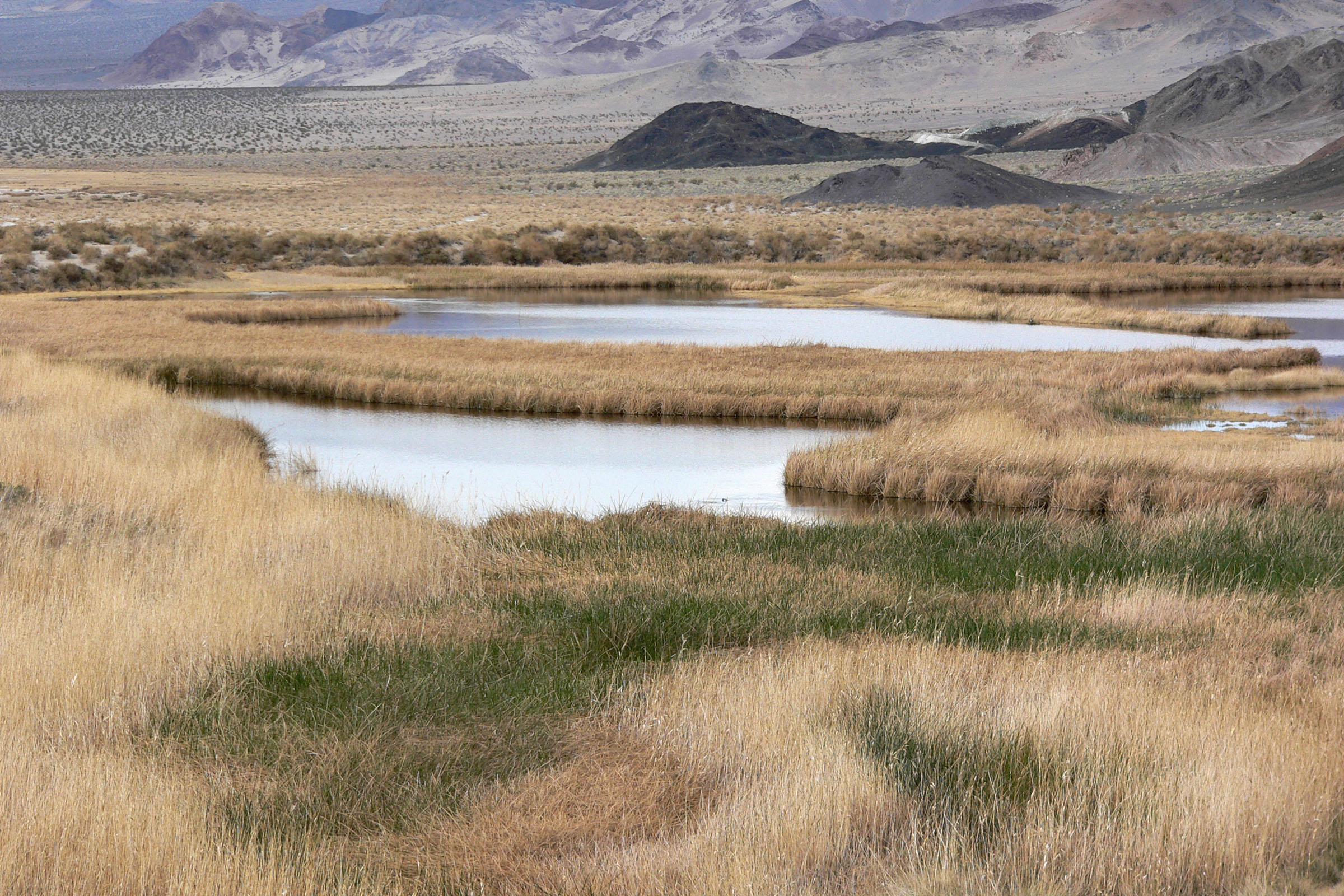
Saratoga Springs

Saratoga Springs (35°40′54″N 116°25′25″W) is a desert oasis located in southern Death Valley National Park. The wetland lies at the southern tip of the Ibex Hills, on the floor of Death Valley and just northeast of the Amargosa River. Several springs overflow into pools totaling 6.6 acres (2.7 ha) in area, making the site the third largest marsh in the park. The pools provide habitat for several endemic species, including the Saratoga Springs pupfish. Other rare species present include the Amargosa tryonia snail, the Amargosa springsnail, the Saratoga Springs belostoma bug, the Amargosa naucorid bug, and the Death Valley June beetle. Plant life includes common reeds, bulrush and saltgrass.

The springs were probably named in 1871 by the Wheeler Survey after the resort town of Saratoga Springs, New York, and were an important water source for the twenty-mule teams of the 1880s. The area saw a failed nitrate rush in 1902, and similarly unsuccessful attempts to mine gold and silver in the middle part of the decade. The Pacific Nitrate Company arrived in 1909 and built a small camp, but left within a few years. From the 1930s through the 1960s the springs provided water for the successful talc mines in the nearby Ibex Hills.

Except for two partially collapsed stone structures, little evidence remains of human habitation at the spring. A dirt road provides access to an overlook of the area, but human entry into the wetland itself is prohibited in order to the protect the sensitive habitat.

== Scotty's Castle ==
Scotty's Castle is a two-story Mission Revival and Spanish Colonial Revival style villa located in the Grapevine Mountains of northern Death Valley. Scotty's Castle is named for gold prospector Walter E. Scott, although Scott never owned it, nor is it an actual castle.

== Shoreline Butte ==
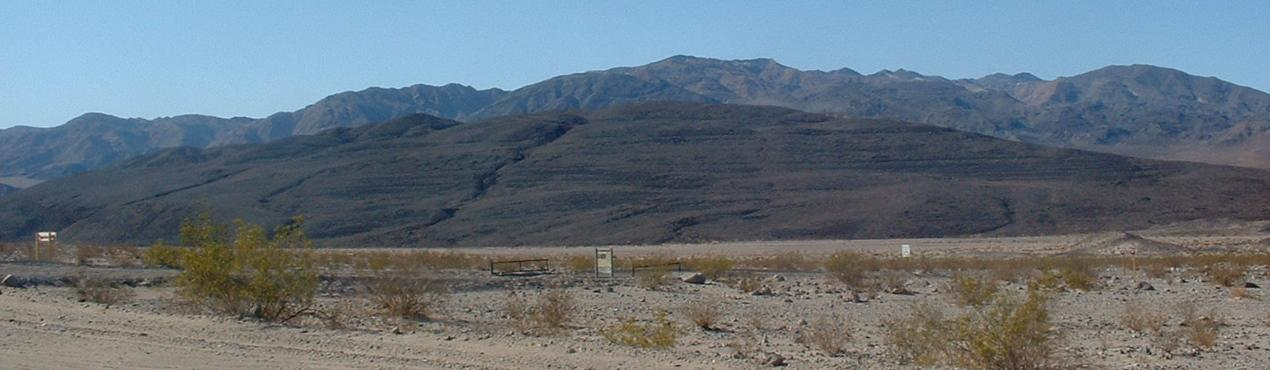
Shoreline Butte

This desert butte was once an island in a lake that filled Death Valley several times during the Pleistocene ice ages. Scientists call all manifestations of this large body of water Lake Manly. There are different horizontal linear features on the northeast flank of the butte that are ancient shorelines from this lake.

It takes some time for waves to gnaw away terraces like the ones seen on Shoreline Butte, so these benches provide records of times when the lake level stabilized long enough for waves to leave their mark on the rock. The highest strandline is one of the principal clues that geologists use to estimate the depth of the lake that once filled Death Valley. Shorelines of ancient Lake Manly are preserved in several parts of Death Valley, but nowhere is the record as clear as at Shoreline Butte. Several lakes have occupied Death Valley since the close of the Pleistocene epoch 10,000 years ago, but these younger lakes were quite shallow compared to Lake Manly (See Badwater and Devils Golf Course above).

== Teakettle Junction ==
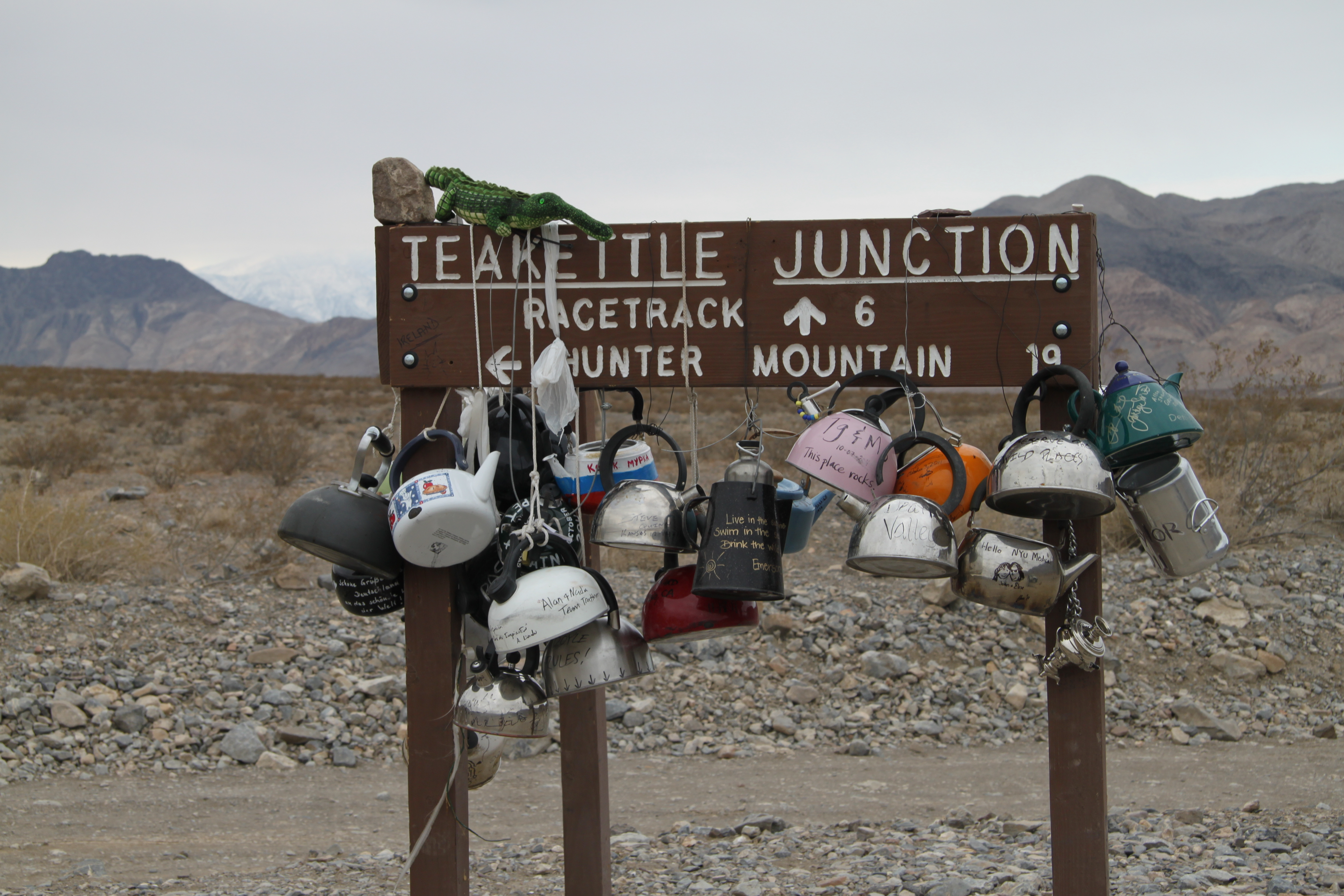
Teakettle Junction

At the junction where the unimproved road from Ubehebe Crater meets roads to the Racetrack Playa and Hunter Mountain (36°45′37″N 117°32′33″W), there is a sign reading "Teakettle Junction." While the origin of the name is unknown, it has become a tradition for visitors to attach teakettles to the sign with messages written on them. National Park Service rangers will sometimes remove a number of teakettles when there are too many.

The rock at the junction includes the bedrock sandstone of the Eureka Quartzite strata.

== Telescope Peak ==
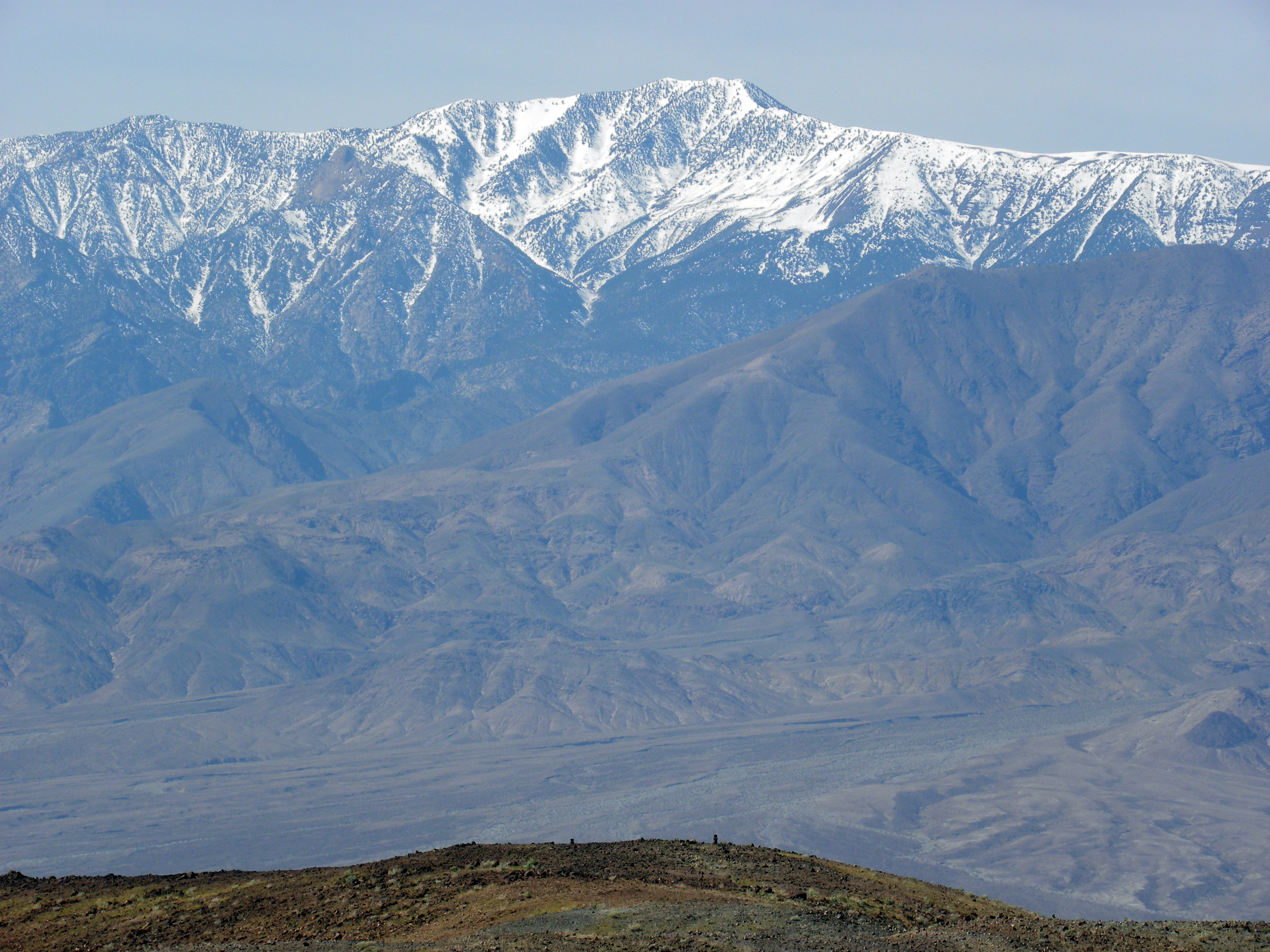
Telescope Peak

Telescope Peak is the highest point within Death Valley National Park and was named for the great distance visible from the summit – from atop this desert mountain one can see for over one hundred miles in many directions, including west to Mount Whitney, and east to Charleston Peak. Its summit rises 11,331 feet (3,454 m) above Badwater Basin, the lowest point in Death Valley at −282 feet (−86 m).

== Titus Canyon ==
Titus Canyon is a narrow gorge in the Grapevine Mountains near the eastern boundary of Death Valley National Park. It features megabreccia and other rock formations, petroglyphs, and wildlife of various kinds, including bighorn sheep. Along the road to the canyon stands Leadfield, a ghost town dating to the 1920s.

== Ubehebe Crater ==
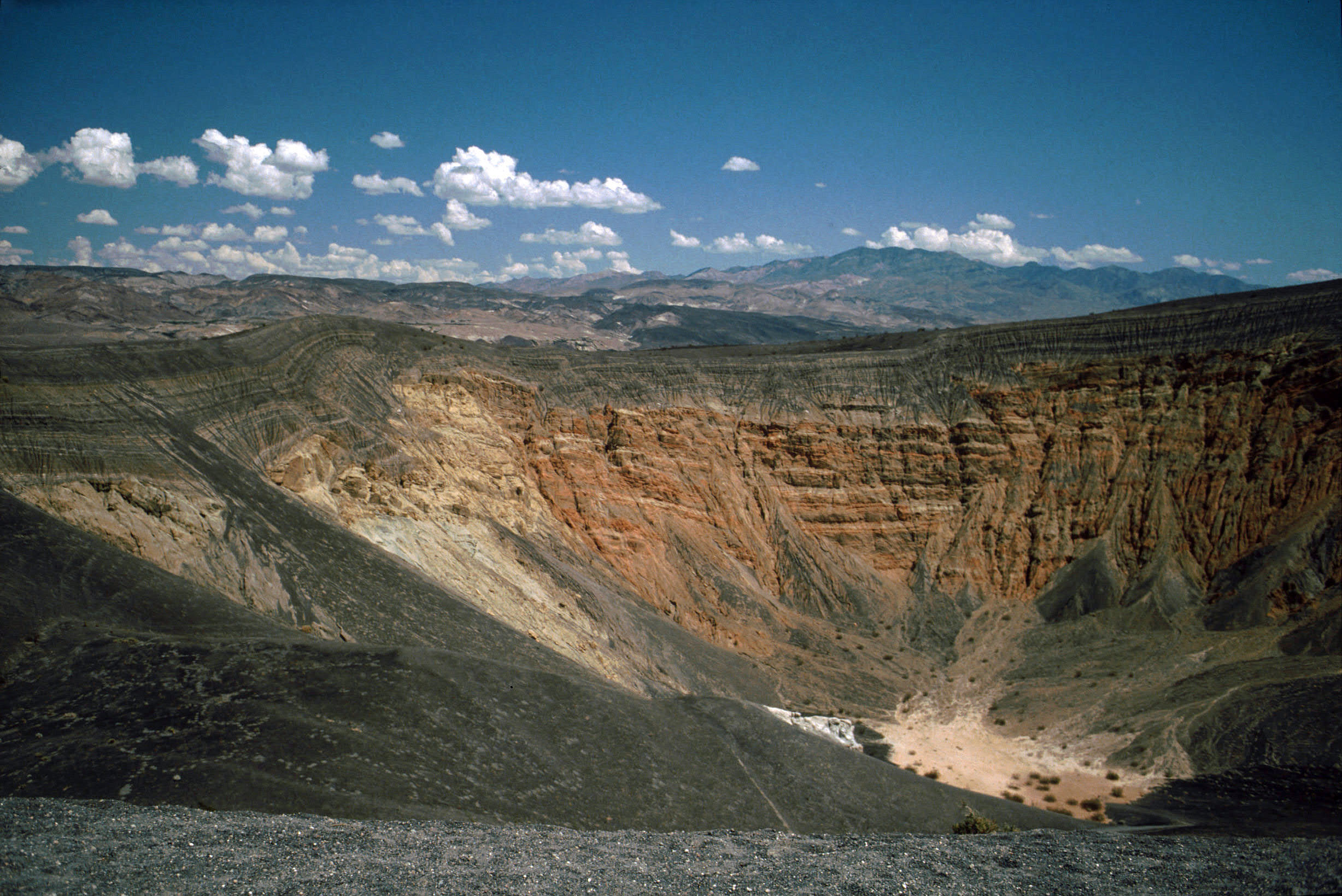
Ubehebe Crater, a maar volcano

Ubehebe Crater is the largest of more than a dozen of in the Ubehebe Craters field. As groundwater exploded into steam due to the heat of magma underneath, an empty pit was left behind and the debris spread around the field. Erosion over the millennia since the eruption revealed multi-colored stripes on the crater walls dating to the Miocene. Visitors can hike on trails to the bottom or around the rim.

== Ventifact Ridge ==
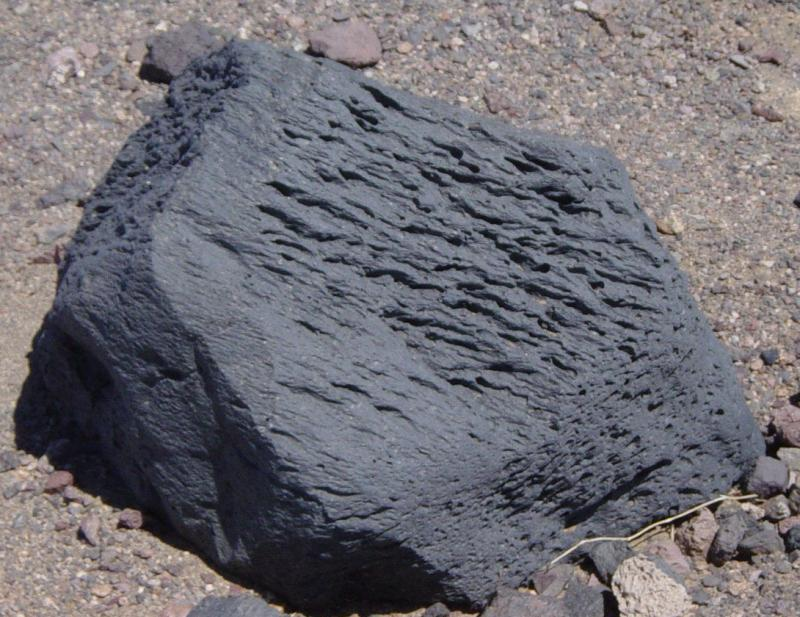
Ventifact at Ventifact Ridge

Ventifact Ridge is a part of a basaltic lava flow. The rocks on its exposed and barren ridge are famous for being shaped by wind erosion and are called ventifacts. Sharp edges of ventifacts called Kanters are formed when two or more facets (planar surfaces) intersect. Open grooves in the ventifacts are called flutes. Most of the holes in the basalt are vesicles that were formed when gas escaped from the cooling lava. Some of these have been expanded or even merged by sandblasting.

Non-stop winds on this ridge are concentrated and compressed at the top of the hill and are very fast as a result. These strong winds pick-up dust and sand (mostly from the two closest alluvial fans), which literally sand-blast exposed surfaces. Winds strong enough for sandblasting come from the north and the south.
