= Eureka Valley =

The name Eureka Valley refers to two distinct places in the U.S. state of California:

- Eureka Valley, San Francisco, a neighborhood
- Eureka Valley (Inyo County), a valley
