= Amargosa springsnail =

Conservation status
- Vulnerable (IUCN 3.1)

- Critically Imperiled (NatureServe)

Scientific classification
- Kingdom: Animalia
- Phylum: Mollusca
- Class: Gastropoda
- Subclass: Caenogastropoda
- Order: Littorinimorpha
- Family: Hydrobiidae
- Genus: Pyrgulopsis
- Species: P. amargosae

Binomial name
- Pyrgulopsis amargosae Hershler, 1989

Species of gastropod

The Amargosa springsnail (Pyrgulopsis amargosae) is a snail in the family Hydrobiidae. It is endemic to the Amargosa River drainage of the southwestern United States. The small (1.5–2.7 mm high) snail is known to occur in several near-brackish springs, including the type locality of Saratoga Springs in Death Valley.

Members of this order are primarily gonochoric and show a broadcast spawning reproductive strategy. Their life cycle begins with the development of embryos into planktonic trochophore larvae, which then metamorphose into juvenile veligers before reaching adulthood.

The Amargosa springsnail are also in Saratoga Springs. This species is characterized by a shell with a shape that is globose to low conical.The apical regions of the teleoconch whorls often appear white because of erosion. The shell's aperture is oval, with a plane that is parallel to the coiling direction.The inner lip of the aperture is thick and curves upward, either making contact with a small portion of the body whorl or remaining slightly separated.The outer lip is straight and thin. The umbilicus, which is the central depression at the base of the shell, can range from a narrow slit to a more open space. Some specimens show visible spiral grooves (striations) on the teleoconch, the portion of the shell formed after hatching.

The snail's body features dark brown to black pigmentation across most of the snout, not including the tip, as well as along the front and back edges of the neck, which is typically lighter in color. Pigmentation may also be shown in parts or all of the operculigerous lobe, the region responsible for housing the operculum: a protective plate used by the snail to close its shell opening.
