= Jason Richard Swallen =

American botanist (1903–1991)

- Born: May 1, 1903; Alliance, Ohio, U.S.
- Died: April 22, 1991 (aged 87); Delaware, Ohio, U.S.
- Education: Kansas State Agricultural College
- Spouses: Leona Winifred Smith (m. 1929) Clara Bayne Brasel (m. 1955)
- Children: 1
- Scientific career
- Fields: Botany: agrostology
- Workplaces: National Museum of Natural History
- Author abbrev. (botany): Swallen and Swall

Jason Richard Swallen (May 1, 1903 – April 22, 1991) was an American botanist who specialized in grasses. He was curator of the Division of Grasses and later head of the Botany Department at the National Museum of Natural History.

Born in Alliance, Ohio, Swallen graduated from Ohio Wesleyan University (AB 1924) and Kansas State Agricultural College (MS 1925). He spent two summers at the Michigan University Biological Station, then in 1925, was a junior botanist at the US Department of Agriculture, serving under the USDA's chief agrostologist A. S. Hitchcock and after Hitchcock's sudden death in 1935, Agnes Chase.

Swallen practiced botany in California in 1927, and from the southwest United States to Yucatan, Mexico, in 1928, 1931 and 1932. In 1936, he published on the grasses of Honduras and Peten, Guatemala, and was promoted to associate botanist. From 1943 to 1945, he served in Brazil as agricultural production officer in the US Office of the Coordinator of Inter-American Affairs.

In 1947, he became the curator of the Division of Grasses at the Smithsonian Institution and chaired the Botany Department from 1950 until his retirement in 1965. In retirement he lived in Florida, Maryland, and Ohio. In 1954 he was awarded an honorary DSc degree by Ohio Wesleyan University.

With Leona Winifred Smith, whom he married on June 10, 1929, he had one daughter, Ester. He was married a second time, to Clara Bayne Brasel, a 1941 Graduate of George Washington University and a Secretary at the Smithsonian, on August 28, 1955. Swallen died in Delaware, Ohio, on April 22, 1991.

The grass genera Swallenia and Swallenochloa are named in his honor, as well as a number of grass species including Eragrostis swallenii, Eriocoma swallenii, Festuca swallenii, and Poa swallenii.
