= Death Valley June beetle =

Scientific classification
- Kingdom: Animalia
- Phylum: Arthropoda
- Clade: Pancrustacea
- Class: Insecta
- Order: Coleoptera
- Suborder: Polyphaga
- Infraorder: Scarabaeiformia
- Family: Scarabaeidae
- Tribe: Melolonthini
- Genus: Polyphylla
- Species: P. erratica

Binomial name
- Polyphylla erratica Hardy & Andrews, 1978

Species of beetle

The Death Valley June beetle (Polyphylla erratica) is a scarab beetle in the subfamily Melolonthinae. It is only known to occur in the drainage basin of the Amargosa River in the southwestern United States. Saltgrass communities, such as those at Saratoga Springs in Death Valley, provide habitat for the insect at all stages of its life.

Predators of the beetle include coyotes, ravens, and shrikes, the last of which are known to impale the insects on vegetation.

The Death Valley June beetle does not carry any official conservation status, but is listed as a Species of Concern by the United States Fish and Wildlife Service. The California Department of Fish and Game considers the beetle a "Special Animal" of high conservation need.
