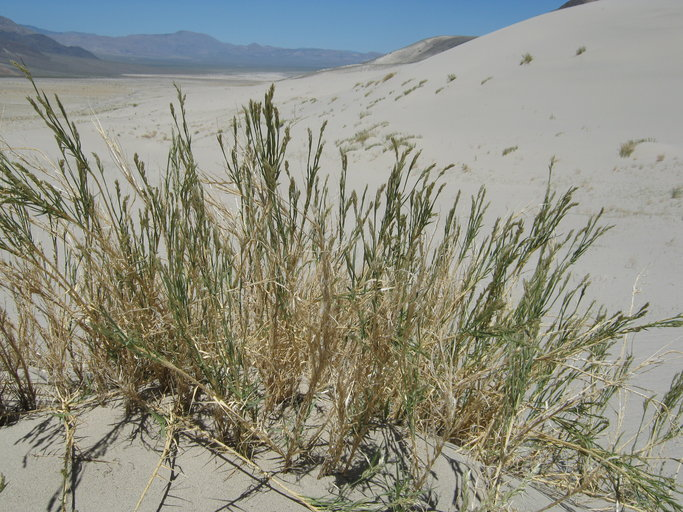

Conservation status
- Critically Imperiled (NatureServe)

Scientific classification
- Kingdom: Plantae
- Clade: Tracheophytes
- Clade: Angiosperms
- Clade: Monocots
- Clade: Commelinids
- Order: Poales
- Family: Poaceae
- Subfamily: Chloridoideae
- Tribe: Cynodonteae
- Subtribe: Scleropogoninae
- Genus: Swallenia; Soderstr. & H.F.Decker
- Species: S. alexandrae

Binomial name
- Swallenia alexandrae (Swallen) Söderstr. & Decker

Synonyms
- Ectosperma Swallen 1950, illegitimate homonym not Vaucher 1803 (syn of Vaucheria, an alga in Xanthophyceae); Ectosperma alexandrae Swallen

= Swallenia =

Genus of grasses

Swallenia is a rare monotypic genus of plants in the grass family, found only in Death Valley National Park, California.

The only known species is Swallenia alexandrae, known by the common names Eureka dunegrass and Eureka Valley dune grass. This genus was named for American botanist Jason Richard Swallen (who specialized in grasses), while the species name was in honor of American philanthropist, museum founder, and paleontologist Annie Montague Alexander.

== Distribution ==
Eureka dunegrass is a rare plant that is endemic to Inyo County, California, where it can be found on a single isolated dune system: the Eureka Valley Sand Dunes in the Eureka Valley of the Mojave Desert, within the boundaries of Death Valley National Park. Only five occurrences are known for this species.

== Description ==
Swallenia alexandrae is a coarse, tufted perennial grass which grows in sand from thick rhizomes. Its stiffly erect clums, sharp-leafed blades, and erect pale-colored panicle inflorescences are diagnostic.

=== Endangered status ===
Eureka dunegrass is a federally listed threatened species of the United States. The main threat to the species' survival has been off-roading, which is no longer permitted in its habitat. Trespassing off-roaders and campers are still a threat to the five remaining occurrences.
