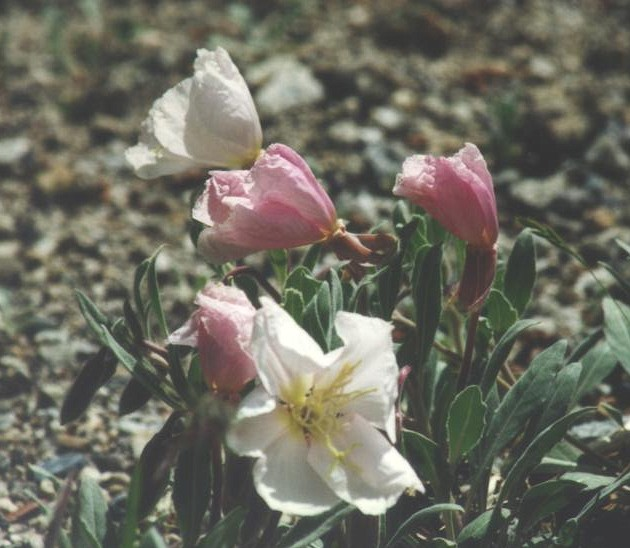

Conservation status
- Apparently Secure (NatureServe)

Scientific classification
- Kingdom: Plantae
- Clade: Tracheophytes
- Clade: Angiosperms
- Clade: Eudicots
- Clade: Rosids
- Order: Myrtales
- Family: Onagraceae
- Genus: Oenothera
- Species: O. avita

Binomial name
- Oenothera avita (W.M.Klein) W.E.Klein

Subspecies
- O. a. subsp. avita; O. a. subsp. californica; O. a. subsp. eurekensis

Synonyms
- Anogra californica; Oenothera californica

= Oenothera avita =

Plant species in the evening primrose family

Oenothera avita, commonly California evening primrose, is a species of plant from the desert Southwest United States and Baja California. It is a flowering plant in the evening primrose family.

== Description ==
California evening primrose is a perennial herb producing a spreading or upright stem 10 to 80 centimeters (4 to 31 in) long. Usually its roots are not fleshy and plants produce new rosettes from spreading side roots, but the subspecies known as the Eureka Dunes evening primrose has fleshy roots and produces new shoots from buried stems. See Subspecies.

Young plants have a basal rosette of leaves, while older ones have leaves along the stem, lance-shaped to nearly oval in shape and up to 6 centimeters long. Flowers occur in the upper leaf axils, drooping in bud and becoming erect as they bloom. The four petals are white, fading pink, and may exceed 3 centimeters long.

== Taxonomy ==
Oenothera avita was described and named Oenothera californica by Sereno Watson in 1876, however this was in conflict with an earlier name, Oenothera californica D.Dietr. published in 1840. Because of this the species was given its accepted name of Oenothera avita by William E. Klein in 1965 when he raised the subspecies described by William McKinley Klein as Oenothera californica subsp. avita 1962 to species status. This is the accepted name according to Plants of the World Online, the Flora of North America, and World Plants. The name Oenothera californica is still used by NatureServe and the NRCS PLANTS database.

It is classified in the genus Oenothera as a part of the family Onagraceae.

=== Subspecies ===
Oenothera avita has and has three accepted subspecies.

==== Oenothera avita subsp. avita ====
The autonymic subspecies is distinguished from the other by its strongly toothed or deeply divided leaves. It grows in Utah, Nevada, Arizona, California, and Baja California. In California it is mostly found to the east of subsp. californica starting near Bishop.

==== Oenothera avita subsp. californica ====
Subspecies californica was initially described as Oenothera albicaulis var. californica by Sereno Watson in 1873. It was eventually described as a subspecies of Oenothera avita by Warren L. Wagner and Kanchi Gandhi in 2022. It is distinguished from subspecies avita by the small teeth or smooth edges on its leaves. It grows in the western part of Southern California from San Luis Obispo County southwards. It is also native to the Little San Bernardino Mountains and Sierra de San Pedro Mártir in Baja California.

==== Oenothera avita subsp. eurekensis ====
This subspecies was first described with the name Oenothera deltoides subsp. eurekensis in 1955 by Philip A. Munz and John Christian Roos. It was given its accepted name by William E. Klein in 1965. It is commonly known as the Eureka Dunes evening primrose. It is distinguished from its close relatives by having fleshy horizontal rootstocks rather than a taproot and new shoots from side roots. It is endemic to Inyo County, California where there are three populations within the Eureka Dunes at elevations of 900–1,200 meters (3,000–3,900 ft). It became a federally listed endangered species 1978, but a plan to reduce offroad vehicle use and sandboarding in the area was successful enough to recommend delisting in 2007. In 2018 the Eureka Dunes evening primrose was officially delisted with a plan for future monitoring.

=== Synonyms ===
It has twelve synonyms of the species or two of its subspecies.

Table of Synonyms
Name	Year	Rank	Synonym of:	Notes
Anogra californica (S.Watson) Small	1896	species	subsp. californica	≡ hom.
Oenothera albicaulis var. californica S.Watson	1873	variety	subsp. californica	≡ hom.
Oenothera albicaulis f. californica (S.Watson) Regel	1881	form	subsp. californica	≡ hom.
Oenothera albicaulis var. melanosperma H.Lév.	1909	variety	subsp. californica	= het.
Oenothera californica (S.Watson) S.Watson	1876	species	subsp. californica	≡ hom., nom. illeg.
Oenothera californica subsp. avita W.M.Klein	1962	subspecies	O. avita	≡ hom.
Oenothera californica var. avita (W.M.Klein) S.L.Welsh & N.D.Atwood	2008	variety	O. avita	≡ hom.
Oenothera californica subsp. eurekensis (Munz & J.C.Roos) W.M.Klein	1962	subspecies	subsp. eurekensis	= het.
Oenothera californica var. glabrata Munz	1931	variety	subsp. californica	= het.
Oenothera californica var. typica Munz	1931	variety	subsp. californica	≡ hom., not validly publ.
Oenothera deltoides subsp. eurekensis Munz & J.C.Roos	1955	subspecies	subsp. eurekensis	= het.
Oenothera pallida var. californica (S.Watson) Jeps.	1925	variety	subsp. californica	≡ hom.
Notes: ≡ homotypic synonym; = heterotypic synonym

=== Names ===
Both Oenothera avita subsp. avita and californica are known by the common name California evening primrose.

== Range and habitat ==
It is native to four US states, Arizona, California, Nevada, and Utah, and also to Baja California in Mexico. In Utah it grows in the southwest of the state and likewise in southern Nevada. In Arizona it is found in the west and in Southern California. It only crosses the boarder into the northern parts of Baja California.

It grows in open habitats, usually in rocky or sandy soils, but also in disturbed areas. It is associated with creosote bush scrub and pinyon–juniper woodlands or oak communities.
