= Eureka Valley (Inyo County) =

Valley in Inyo County, California, United States

Coordinates: 37.227°N 117.762°W

Eureka Valley is located in Inyo County, in eastern California in the southwestern United States. It is approximately 28 miles (45 km) long and up to 10 miles (16 km) wide, with elevations varying from 2,870 feet (870 m) up to 8,456 feet (2,577 m). The southern section of the valley is now part of the Death Valley National Park - Death Valley itself lies just to the southeast. To the north is Deep Springs Valley, Fish Lake Valley, and the White Mountain Range. To the east the Last Chance Range rises over 5,500 feet (1,700 m) above the valley floor. To the west are the Saline Mountains, and to the southwest lies Saline Valley.

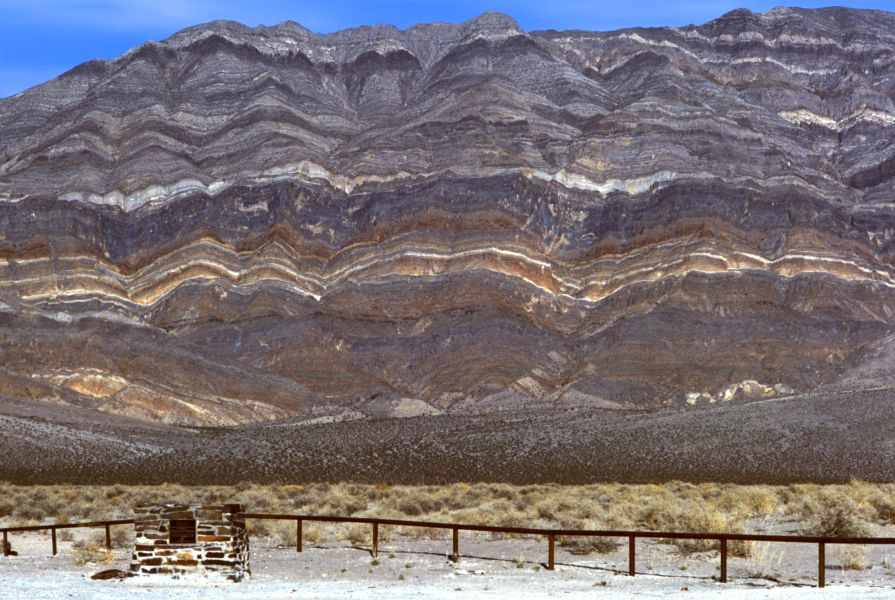
Cliffs in Eureka Valley, California

Eureka Valley is a graben, like most other lower-lying areas of the Basin and Range Province. An improved gravel road crosses the valley, connecting the community of Big Pine to the northern Grapevine section of Death Valley. A 10-mile gravel road provides access to the southern end of the valley. More primitive routes exit the valley to the northwest via Soldier Pass, to the northeast via Horse Thief Pass, and to the south via Dedeckera Canyon.

The valley has two distinguishing features. Its shape alters the wind in such a way as to collect sand near its southern end, leading to the unique Eureka Dunes. Just to the east of the dunes, the Last Chance Range climbs over 3,500 feet (1,100 m) as near-vertical cliffs, displaying colorful rock strata.

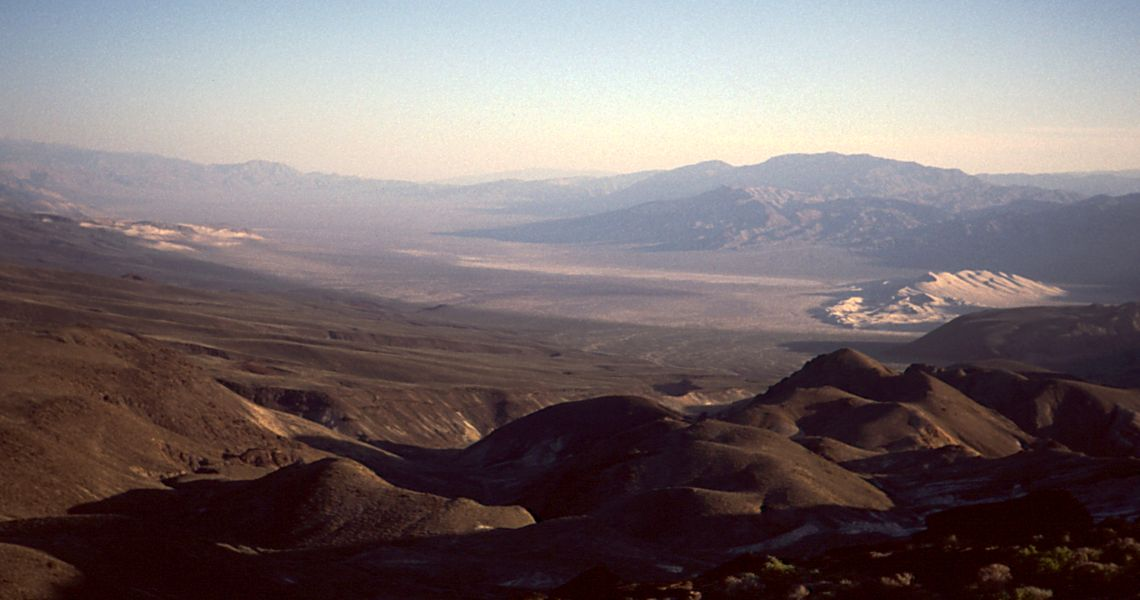
Eureka Valley, California, and the Eureka Sand Dunes

== Sand Dunes ==
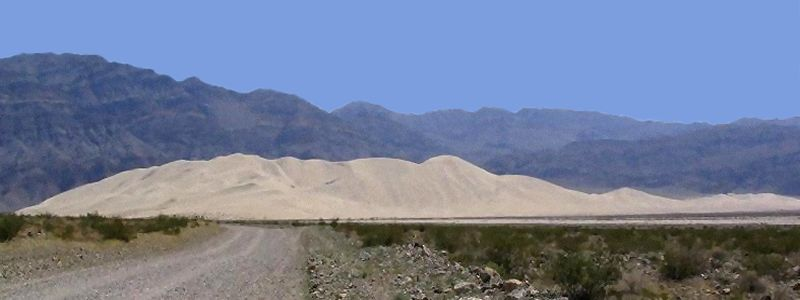
The Eureka Valley Sand Dunes, looking south

The Eureka Valley Sand Dunes are located in the southern part of Eureka Valley. Although covering an area of only 3 square miles (7.8 km^{2}), the dunes rise approximately 680 feet (210 m) above the surrounding valley floor, making them one of the highest dune fields in North America. Eureka Valley is a basin and range structural valley oriented northwest–southeast and enclosed by the Last Chance Range to the east and the Saline Range to the west. The Eureka Dunes themselves are located in the southeasternmost tip of the valley and trend north–south, parallel to Last Chance Range. According to a USGS survey map, the surrounding mountain ranges contain rocks that date back to the Mississippian and Cambrian periods while the surficial deposits on the valley floor are made up mainly of alluvium dating to the Quaternary period. They are also classified as booming sand dunes, one of only about forty worldwide.

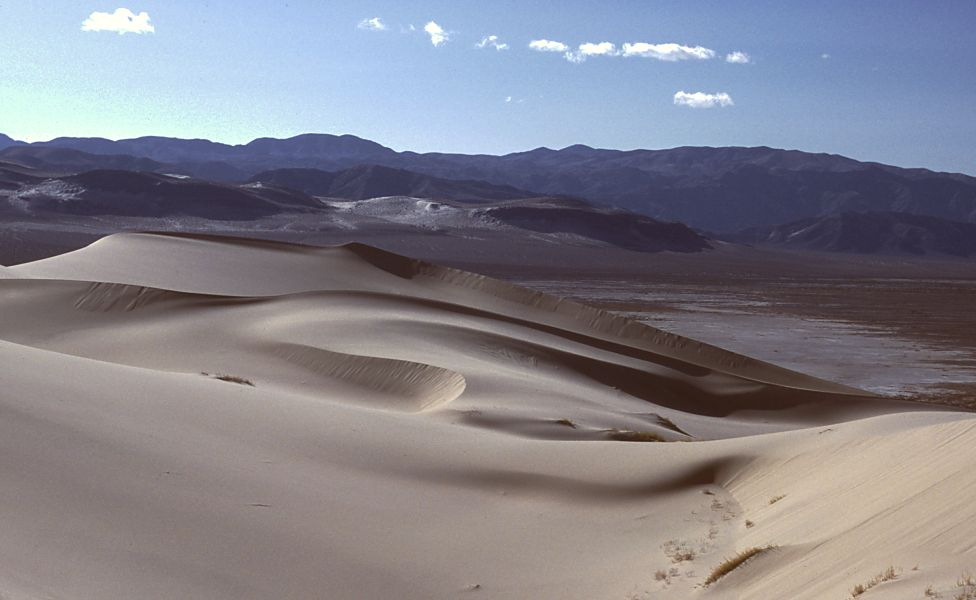
The Eureka Dunes, looking west

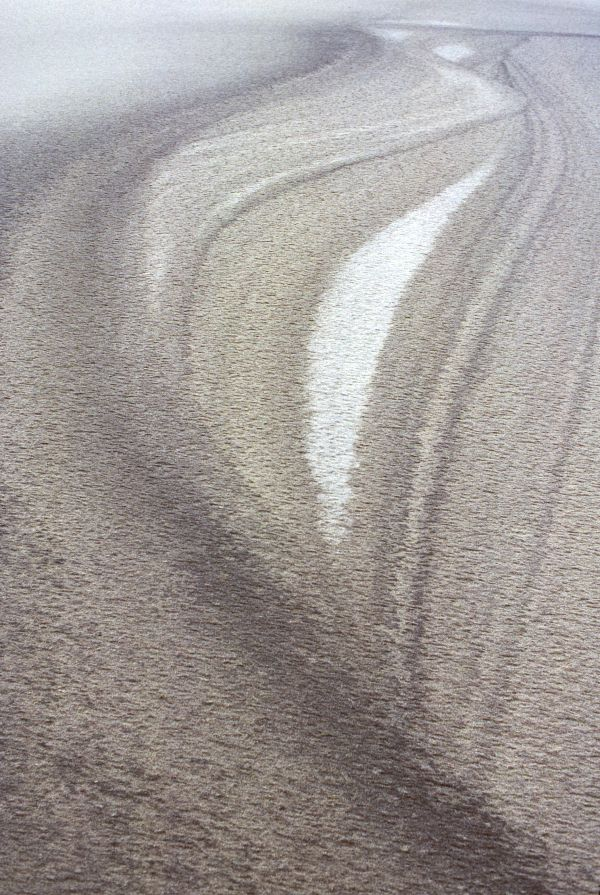
Patterns in the Eureka Dunes after a rainstorm

Accessed via a gravel road in Eureka Valley (which connects to a road running from Big Pine to the Grapevine section of Death Valley), the dunes became part of the Death Valley National Park as part of its expansion in 1994. Foot travel in the dunes is permitted, but vehicle access is prohibited. A primitive campground is located at the north end of the dune field.

Sand dunes also exist in Death Valley near Stovepipe Wells. The Eureka Dunes share regional characteristics with the Kelso Dunes in the Mojave Desert.

=== Morphology ===
The Eureka Dunes are an example of a complex-linear dune – the main ridge is a static linear dune but there are active star dunes formations superimposed on the linear dune A linear dune has alternating slip faces on opposite sides of the crest. This means that both sides of the dune have similar slopes and wind must have come from both the northern and southern ends of the valley. Star dunes have "arms" radiating off of a central crest that change direction as the wind direction changes. Little is known about the past of the Eureka Dunes and its development. The sand source is unknown, although some scientists believed that it originated from an ancient lake at the northern end of the valley.

=== Booming ===
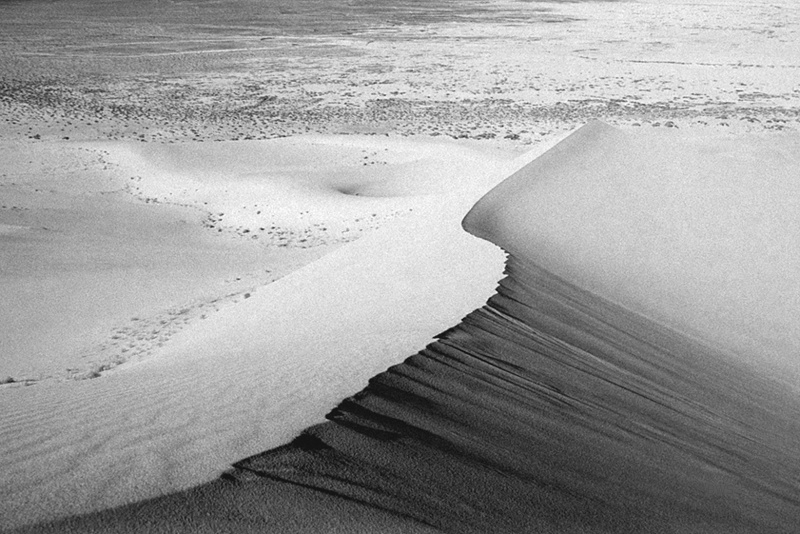
Curving dune

The unique booming characteristic of the Eureka Dunes is caused by the relative motion of moving sand grains. The sound has been compared to moans, hums, drums, and, in the case of Eureka, a distant propeller plane. Most researchers agree that the average sand grain size should be smaller than 300 μm, well-sorted with no dusty material, dry and in low humidity, loosely packed, and each sand grain should be spherical and smooth The booming sound occurs when a sheet of sand avalanches down the slip face, exciting the sand grains. The friction between these grains creates an acoustic air wave that emits an audible sound.

=== Ecology ===
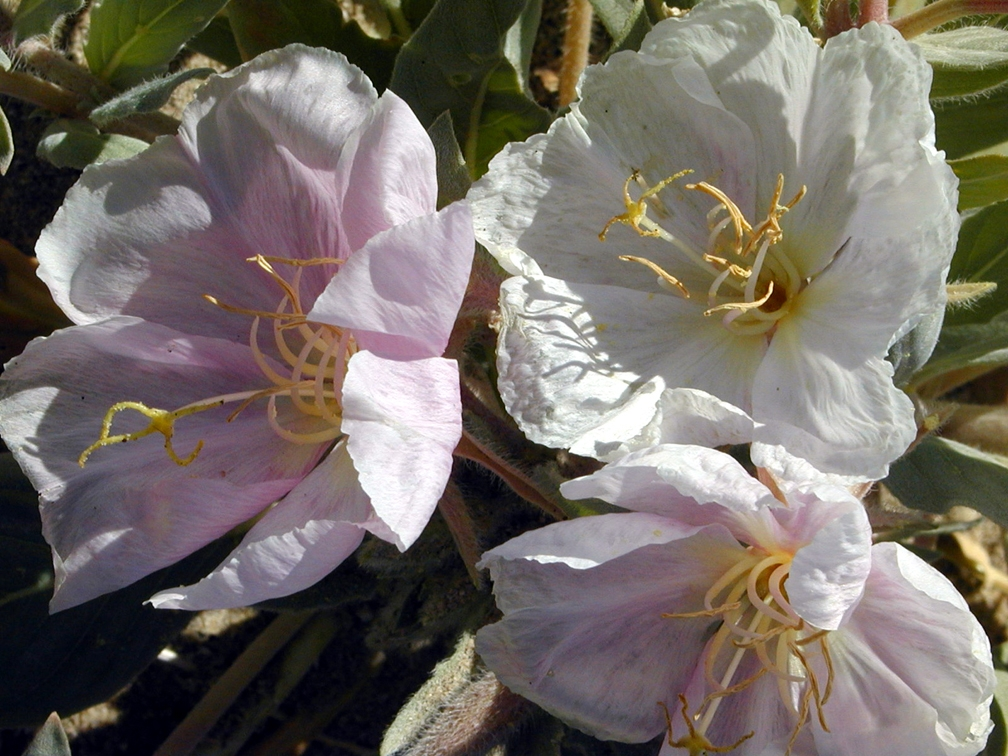
Eureka Evening Primrose

The Eureka Dunes are the home of several unique (and protected) plant species. The Eureka Dune Grass (Swallenia alexandrae), the Eureka Dunes evening primrose (Oenothera avita subsp. eurekensis), and the Shining Locoweed (Astragalus lentiginosus micans) are only found in this area. Visitors to the dunes may also experience other unique aspects of these dunes, other than the booming. In wet weather, patterns can be seen in the sand that reveals the diverse sources, and the complex Aeolian process by which these dunes are formed and re-formed, and sources and processes that are not yet fully understood.

== See also ==
- Deep Springs Valley
