= Cadiz Dunes Wilderness =

Protected wilderness area in California, United States

- IUCN category Ib (wilderness area)
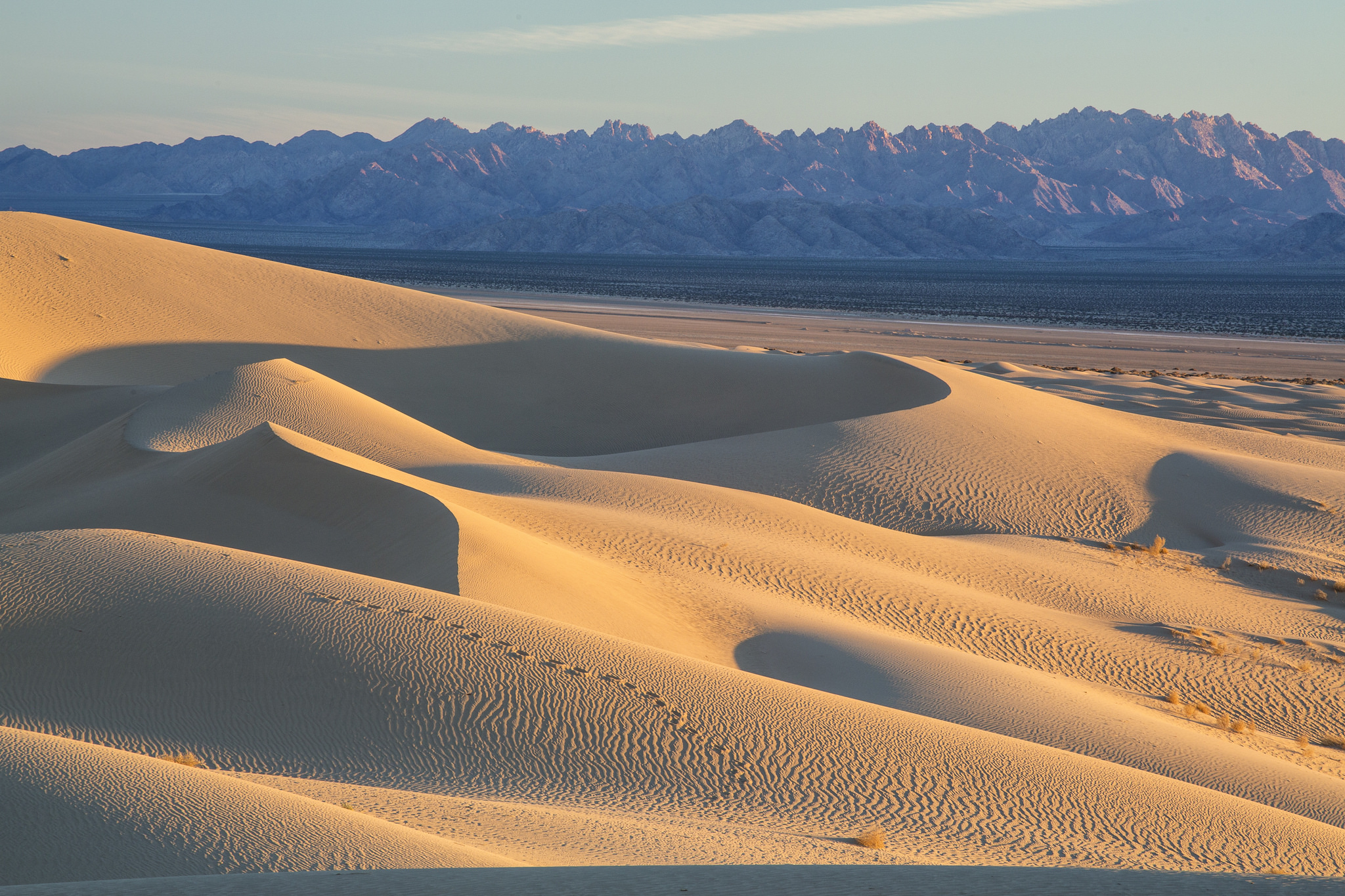

- Location within California Location within the United States
- Location: San Bernardino County, California, United States
- Nearest town: Amboy, CA
- Coordinates: 34.374974°N 115.385655°W
- Area: 19,935 acres (81 km^{2})
- Established: 1994
- Governing body: U.S. Department of Interior Bureau of Land Management

Cadiz Dunes Wilderness is a protected wilderness area in the Mojave Trails National Monument in San Bernardino County, California. Established in 1994 by the U.S. Congress, the area is managed by the Bureau of Land Management. This wilderness area is north of Joshua Tree National Park, Sheephole Valley Wilderness lies to the west, Old Woman Mountains Wilderness to the east. The dunes of Cadiz Dunes were formed by blowing sands from the Cadiz dry lake, all located in the Cadiz Valley between the Calumet Mountains and the Old Woman Mountains. The ecology is typical of the Mojave Desert with wildlife that includes coyote, black-tailed jackrabbits, ground squirrels, kangaroo rats, quail, roadrunners, and rattlesnakes. The area is known for a brilliant display of springtime desert wildflowers including the Borrego milkvetch.

== See also ==
- List of U.S. Wilderness Areas
