= Piute Mountains =

Mountain range of Southern California

- Location within southern California Location within California Location within the United States

Highest point
- Elevation: 964 m (3,163 ft)

Geography
- Country: United States
- State: California
- Region: Mojave Desert
- District: San Bernardino County
- Range coordinates: 34°46′55″N 115°3′58″W
- Topo map: USGS Fenner Spring

The Piute Mountains are a mountain range located in the Eastern Mojave Desert and within Mojave Trails National Monument, in San Bernardino County, California.

== Geography ==
The range crosses Interstate 40 at Mountain Springs Summit, 2,770 feet above sea level. The mountains are located northeast of the Old Woman Mountains, southwest of the Piute Range, and east of the Fenner Valley, which includes the small communities of Essex, Goffs, and Fenner. The Mojave National Preserve is to the northwest, and the Bigelow Cholla Garden Wilderness and Sacramento Mountains are to the east.

The Piute Mountains exhibit strong color contrast and texture that vary from very angular, jagged volcanics to rounded, smooth granite hills; and the ridges are cut by numerous canyons and washes.

== Wilderness ==
The Piute Mountains Wilderness is in the Piute Mountains and the surrounding bajadas and extensive alluvial fans, below US Route 66. The 48,080 acres (19,460 ha) wilderness is within Mojave Trails National Monument and managed by the Bureau of Land Management (BLM).

Dominant vegetation is creosote bush scrub, which gradually changes into a mixed desert scrub at higher elevations. The large bajadas provide excellent habitat for the threatened desert tortoise. The entire wilderness area has been identified as critical habitat for the desert tortoise.

== See also ==
- Eriogonum breedlovei — endemic native plant
