= Old Woman Mountains Wilderness =

Protected wilderness area in California, United States

- IUCN category Ib (wilderness area)
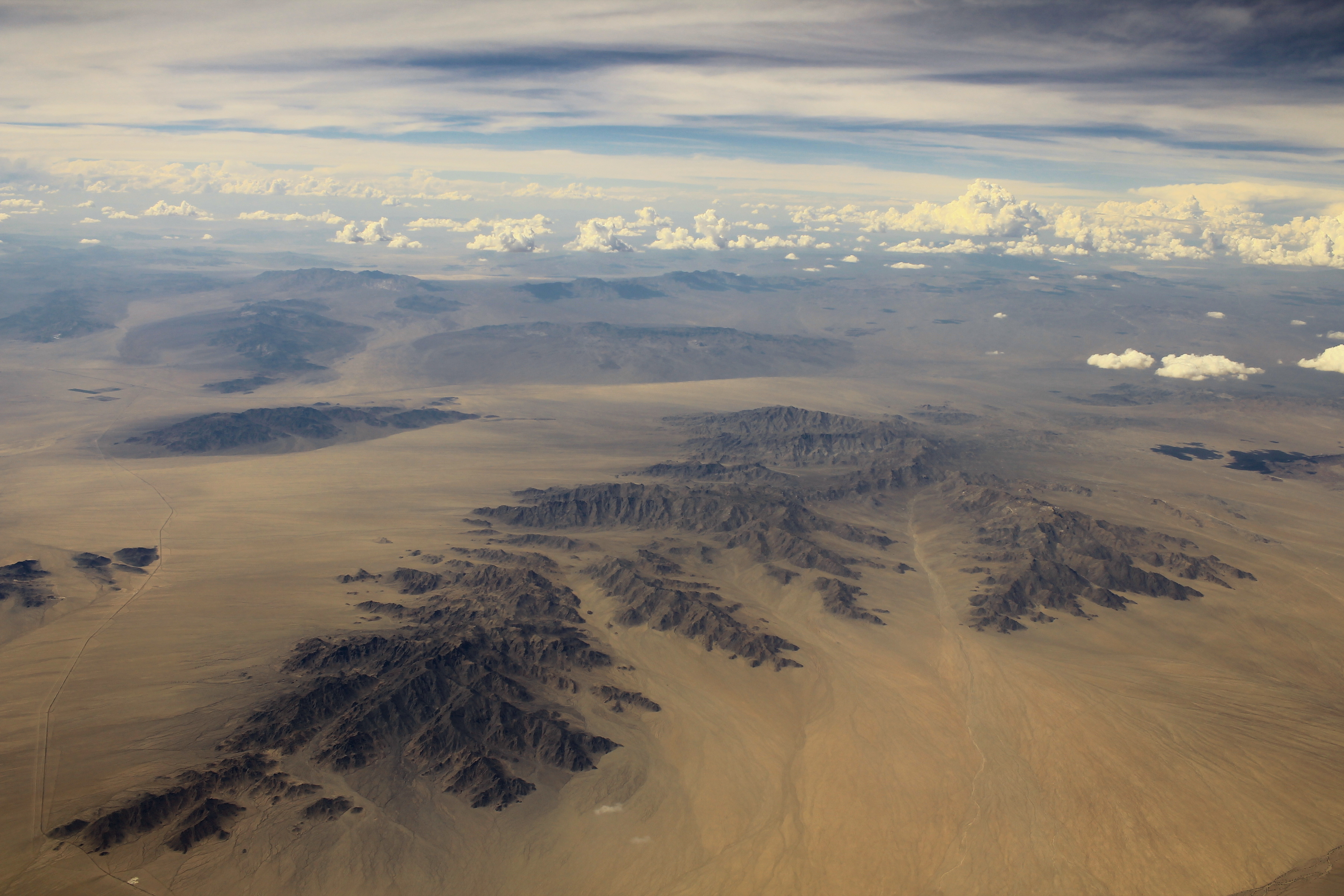
- Aerial view of the Old Woman Mountains Wilderness

- Location within southern California Location within California Location within the United States
- Location: Mojave Desert, San Bernardino County, California U.S.
- Nearest city: Needles, California
- Coordinates: 34°27′46″N 115°11′38″W
- Area: 163,120 acres (660.1 km^{2})
- Established: 1994
- Governing body: Bureau of Land Management

Old Woman Mountains Wilderness is a wilderness area in the Old Woman Mountains of the eastern Mojave Desert. It is located south of Essex in San Bernardino County, California.

This 163,120-acre (660 km^{2}) wilderness was established in 1994, and is managed by the Bureau of Land Management.

The 1975 discovery of the Old Woman Meteorite is located in the Old Woman Mountains and is the largest meteorite found in California and the second largest in the United States.

== Geography ==
The area consists of bajadas (extensive flat aprons of alluvium) and the massive, fault-lifted Old Woman Mountains that extend some 35 miles (56 km) north-south and up to 28 miles (45 km) in an east-west direction. The elevations within the wilderness range from 800 feet (240 m) in the drainage bottoms to over 5,300 feet (1,600 m) at the top of Old Woman Peak. The mountains take their name from a granite monolith resembling the figure of an old woman, known as the Old Woman Statue (5,000 feet high).

== Ecology ==
The Old Woman Mountains Wilderness falls within a transition zone between the Lower Colorado and Mojave deserts and encompasses many different habitat types. Creosote bush scrub dominates the lower elevations, grading into mixed desert scrub at middle elevations with juniper-pinyon woodland at the higher elevations. The dry washes are characterized by catclaw acacia, cheesebush, desert lavender, little-leaf ratany, and desert almond.

Wildlife is typical for the Mojave Desert; including a permanent population of bighorn sheep, mule deer, bobcat, cougar, coyote, black-tailed jackrabbit, ground squirrels, kangaroo rats, quail, chuckar, roadrunners, rattlesnakes, and several species of lizards. Numerous raptor species are likely to be found in the area; including prairie falcons, red-tailed hawks, golden eagles, Cooper's hawks, American kestrels, as well as several species of owls. The washes and canyons provide good habitat for several species of songbirds, and the bird densities and diversity is further enhanced by the presence of the known 24 springs and seeps.

The bajadas provide excellent desert tortoise habitat; 49,683 acres (201 km^{2}) of the wilderness area have been identified as critical habitat for the threatened desert tortoise.
