= Bonanza Spring =

Largest aquifer fed freshwater spring in the Mojave Desert

- Bonanza Springs
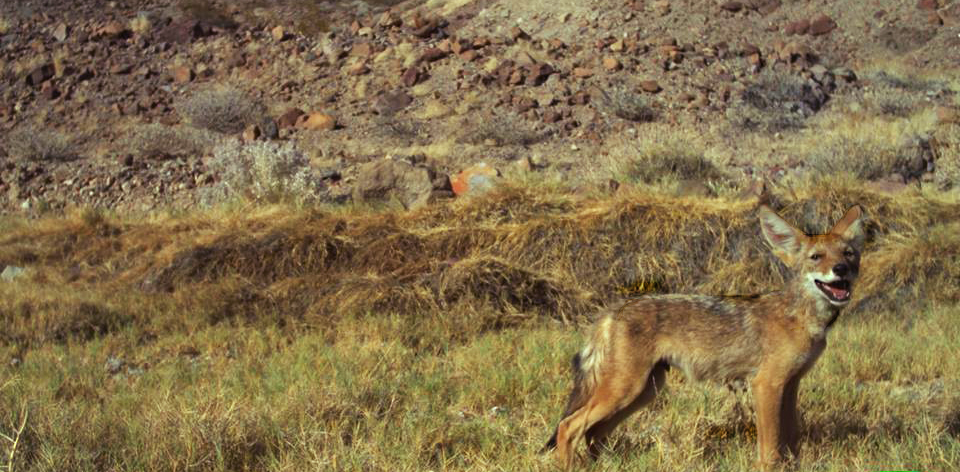
- Coyote near Bonanza Spring
- Interactive map of Bonanza Spring
- Location: Mojave Desert in San Bernardino County, California
- Coordinates: 34°40′32″N 115°23′53″W
- Elevation: 2,105 ft (642 m)
- Type: aquifer fed freshwater spring
- Magnitude: fifth or sixth
- Discharge: 10 gallons per minute

Bonanza Spring is the largest fresh water spring system in the Mojave Desert. The spring is within the boundaries of the Bonanza Springs Wildlife Area managed by the Bureau of Land Management. It is located in San Bernardino County approximately 50 miles due west from Needles, California, and a couple miles north of Route 66 near Essex, California. It is not to be confused with Bonanza Springs in Lake County, California.

== Description ==
Bonanza Spring is the largest spring in the Mojave Desert, it is located in the foothills of the Clipper Mountains. The spring is surrounded by vegetation including mesquite, cottonwood trees, and cattails. The shallow water of the pool supports catfish and bluegills.

A now abandoned Santa Fe Railroad stop called Danby (now a ghost town) refilled its water tanks from a pipeline from the spring for its steam engines.

The spring waters stretch for a half mile and provide habitat for frogs and toads. The Bonanza Spring wetlands are the largest within a 1,000-square-mile (2,600 km^{2}) area. The spring discharges approximately 10 U.S. gallons (38 L) per minute and is rated as a fifth- or sixth-magnitude spring.

== Environmental issues ==
Pumping by the development company Cadiz Water Project Inc. could potentially dry up the springs as the operation extracts approximately 16.3 billion gallons (50,000 acre feet) annually for 50 years. The company maintains that the water pumping will not have an effect on the springs, however environmental groups differ with their findings. Independent peer review of the environmental studies that have suggested a connection of Bonanza Spring with Cadiz pumping, however, have noted potentially serious flaws and inconsistencies in those studies.

Indigenous peoples living in the area along with leadership from the Native American Land Conservancy have reported that nearby springs in the area near Old Woman Mountains have dried up since the Cadiz company began agricultural pumping. The Victor Valley Daily News has reported that "the lives and cultures of desert peoples — the Chemehuevi, the Mojave, the Cahuilla, the Serrano, and many others — became inextricably intertwined with the survival of desert springs. Desert tribes have spoken up strongly in opposition to Cadiz, as has the Native American Land Conservancy, due to the threat Cadiz poses to our living cultures." In 2020, the Three Valleys Municipal Water District voted to proceed with an in-depth study of the possible environmental impacts of the Cadiz Water Project on the springs.

== See also ==
- Mojave National Preserve
