= Coxcomb Mountains =

Mountain range in Southern California

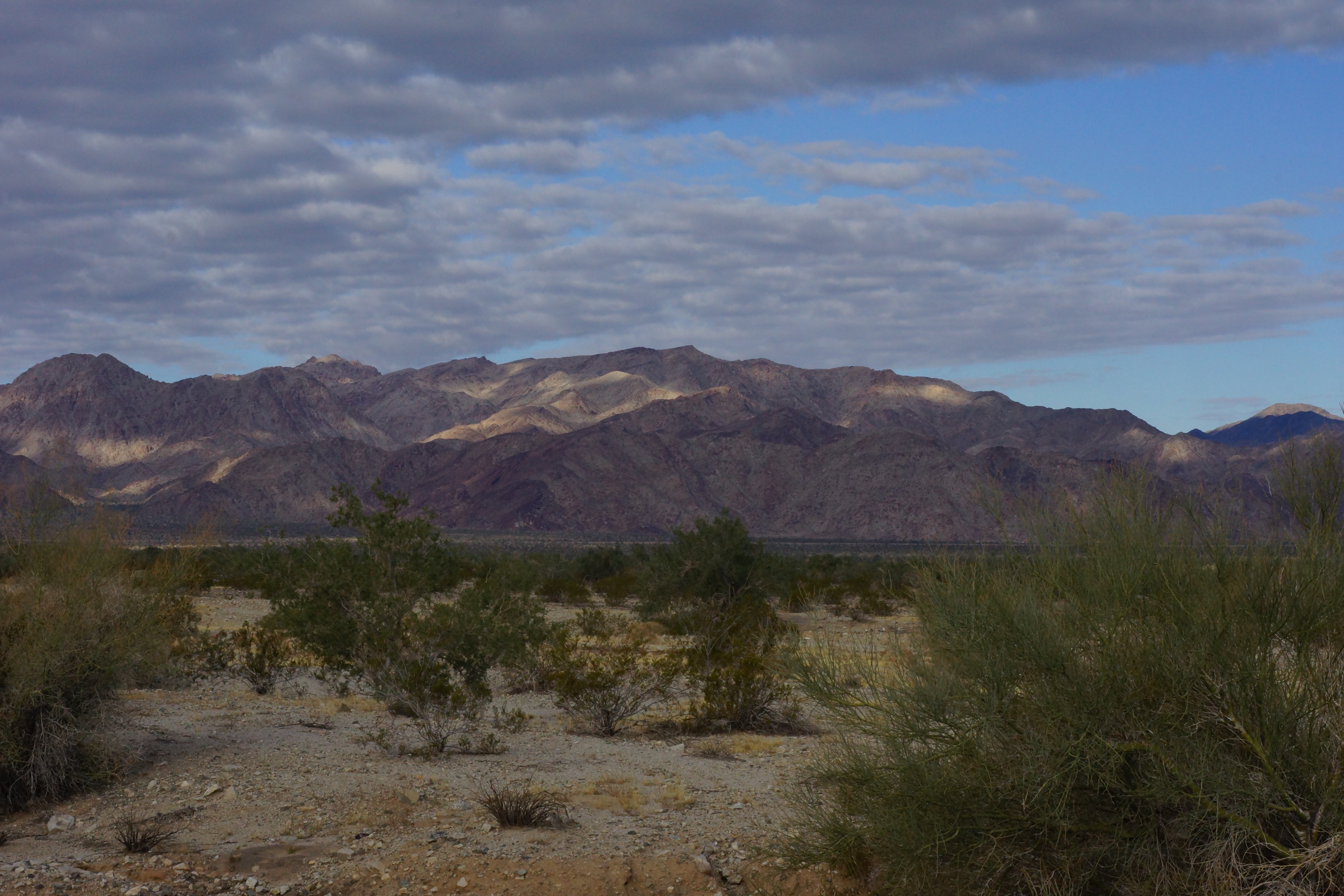

Highest point
- Elevation: 4,416 ft (1,346 m)

Geography
- Location within California
- Country: United States of America
- State: California (In USA)
- District: Riverside County
- Range coordinates: 33°56′12″N 115°20′31″W
- Topo map: USGS Coxcomb Mountains

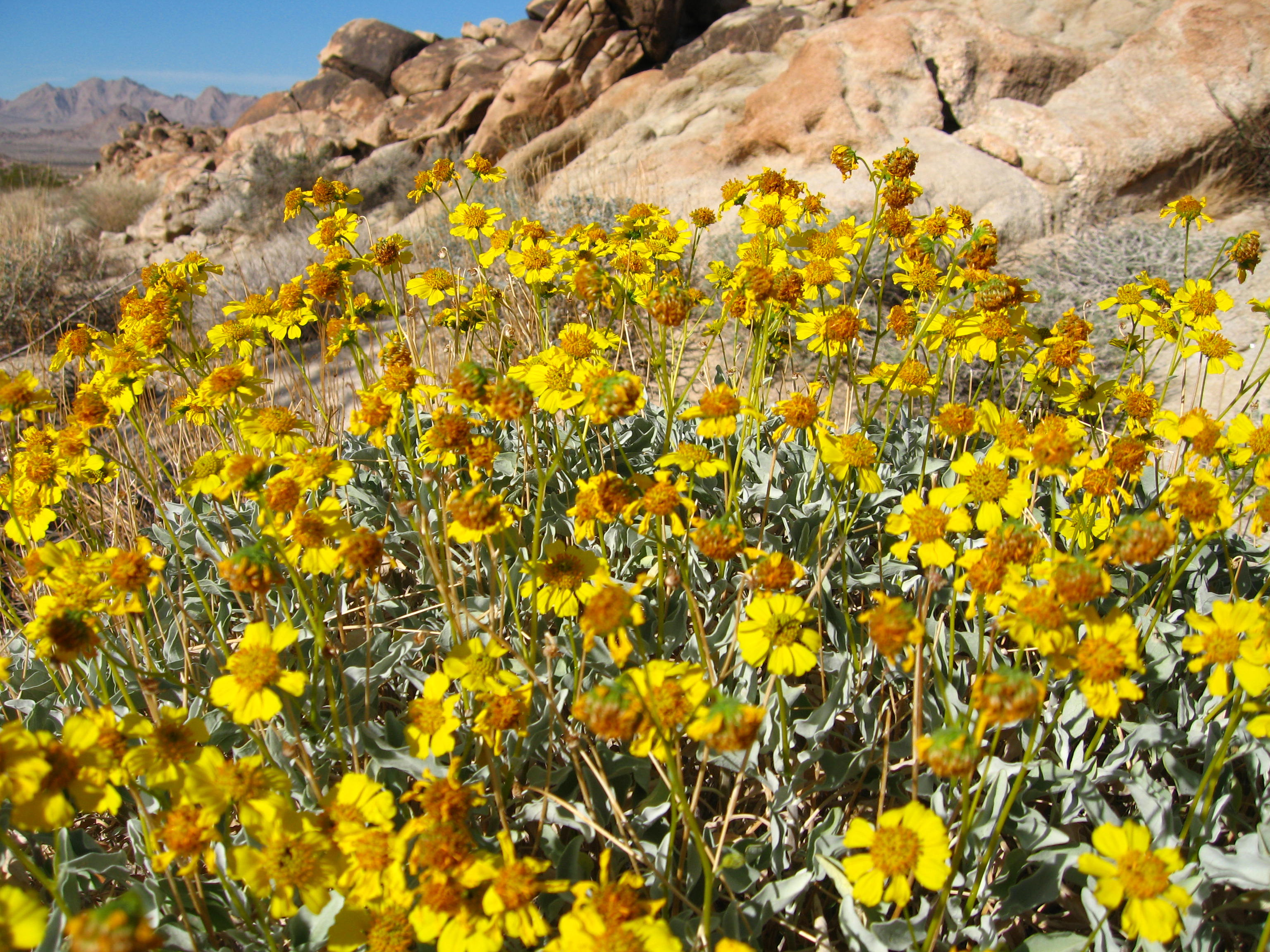
Acton's brittlebrush (Encelia actoni), in the Coxcomb Mountains.

The Coxcomb Mountains are a mountain range in eastern Riverside County, Southern California, and to a small extent in San Bernardino County.

== Geography ==
The Coxcomb Mountains are within the easternmost area of Joshua Tree National Park. They are east of the Eagle Mountains and Twentynine Palms, north of Interstate 10, and southeast of the Sheep Hole Mountains.

The range's highest point is Spectre Peak, at an elevation of 4,482 feet (1,366 m), located within the park. It is at GPS latitude—longitude coordinates of N 34.026279, W -115.404748.

== Joshua Tree National Park ==
The Coxcomb Mountains are the most rugged and sharply perpendicular mountains within Joshua Tree National Park. Being in the park's wildest and least-visited northeastern corner, their relative isolation protects their wilderness habitat.

The range is in the ecotone where habitats merge from the higher elevation Mojave Desert ecoregion and the lower elevation Colorado Desert of the Sonoran Desert ecoregion.

== See also ==
- Camp Coxcomb World War 2 training camp
- Flora of the California desert regions
- List of Sonoran Desert wildflowers
- Mountain ranges of the Colorado Desert
- Mountain ranges of the Mojave Desert
