= Eriogonum breedlovei =

Conservation status
- Vulnerable (NatureServe)

Scientific classification
- Kingdom: Plantae
- Clade: Embryophytes
- Clade: Tracheophytes
- Clade: Angiosperms
- Clade: Eudicots
- Order: Caryophyllales
- Family: Polygonaceae
- Genus: Eriogonum
- Species: E. breedlovei

Binomial name
- Eriogonum breedlovei (J.T.Howell) Reveal

Species of wild buckwheat

Eriogonum breedlovei is a rare species of wild buckwheat known by the common name Paiute buckwheat. It is endemic to the High Sierra Nevada of California, where its two varieties are uncommon members of the flora in granite and limestone rocky high mountain habitat.

== Description ==
Eriogonum breedlovei is a perennial herb forming low mats of spreading stems lined with woolly oval leaves no longer than about a centimeter. The inflorescence is a cluster of tiny white to reddish, hairy flowers.

== Taxonomy ==
In 1963 John Thomas Howell described a new variety of Eriogonum ochrocephalum which he named breedlovei. In 1966 the botanist James Reveal published paper where he raised to a species as Eriogonum breedlovei. It is part of the Eriogonum which is classified in the Polygonaceae family. The species has two varieties.

=== Varieties ===
Both varieties of this species are rare:

- var. breedlovei, Breedlove's buckwheat, is endemic to the Piute Mountains of Kern County, California, where only a few occurrences are known.
- var. shevockii, Shevock's buckwheat or The Needles buckwheat, can be found on a few Sierra peaks, including The Needles, in Kern and Tulare Counties.
