= Calumet Mountains =

Mountain range in the American state of California

- Location within California

Highest point
- Elevation: 829 m (2,720 ft)

Geography
- Country: United States
- State: California
- District: San Bernardino County
- Range coordinates: 34°13′59.013″N 115°30′43.955″W
- Topo map: USGS East of Dale Lake

The Calumet Mountains are a mountain range in San Bernardino County, California. They are north of Joshua Tree National Park and adjacent to the Sheep Hole Mountains in the Mojave Desert. The highest point is 829 meters (2,720 feet).

== Sheephole Valley Wilderness Area ==
The Bureau of Land Management designated and manages the Sheephole Valley Wilderness Area, which includes the Calumet Mountains, within Mojave Trails National Monument. Sheephole Valley Wilderness Area The 194,861-acre (approximate) Sheephole Valley Wilderness is a perfect representation of the basin and range topography typical in the Mojave Desert. The area consists of the northwest to southeast trending granitic boulder strewn Calumet Mountains and Sheep Hole Mountains, and is adjacent to the northern boundary of Joshua Tree National Park.
