= Desert Discovery Center =

Coordinates: 34.8897°N 117.0229°W

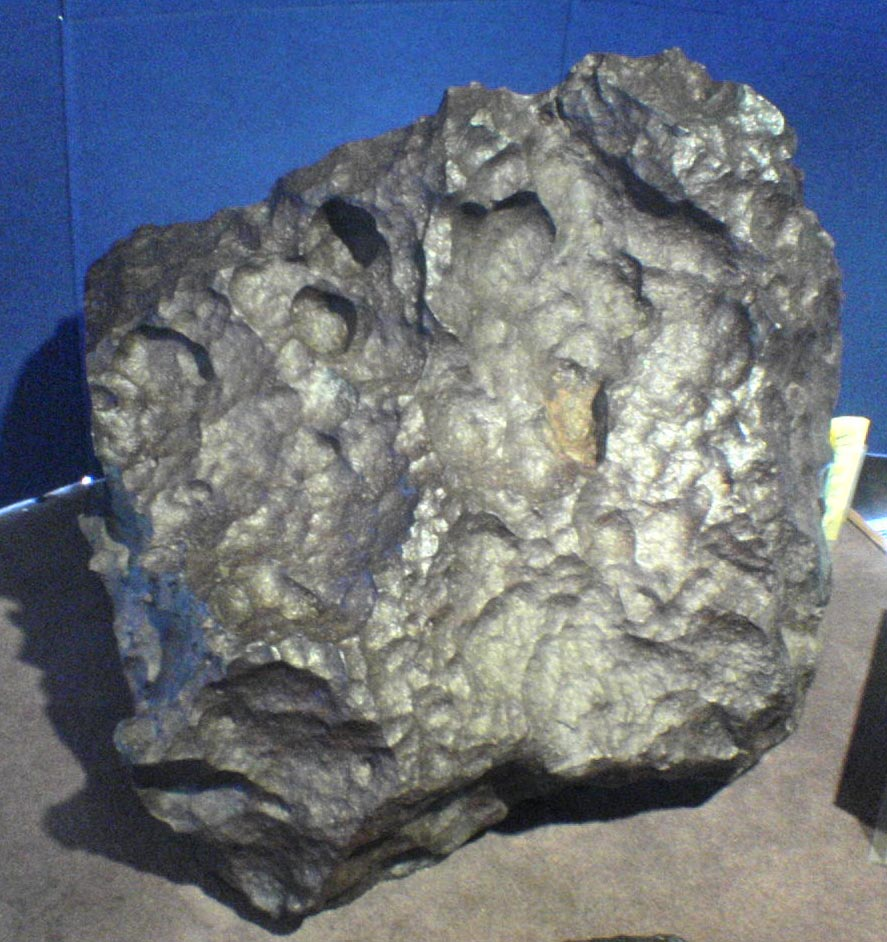
Old Woman meteorite

The Desert Discovery Center is a public-run community education center located in Barstow, California. The center is staffed by the Bureau of Land Management and focuses on promoting awareness of desert life to local residents.

The Center is a partnership among the Bureau of Land Management, National Park Service, Barstow Unified School District, Barstow Community College, Mojave River Valley Museum, City of Barstow, and Discovery Trails, a non-profit organization dedicated to the Mojave Desert.

The Center was formerly known as the California Desert Information Center, and houses the Old Woman Meteorite, the second largest meteorite in the United States.
