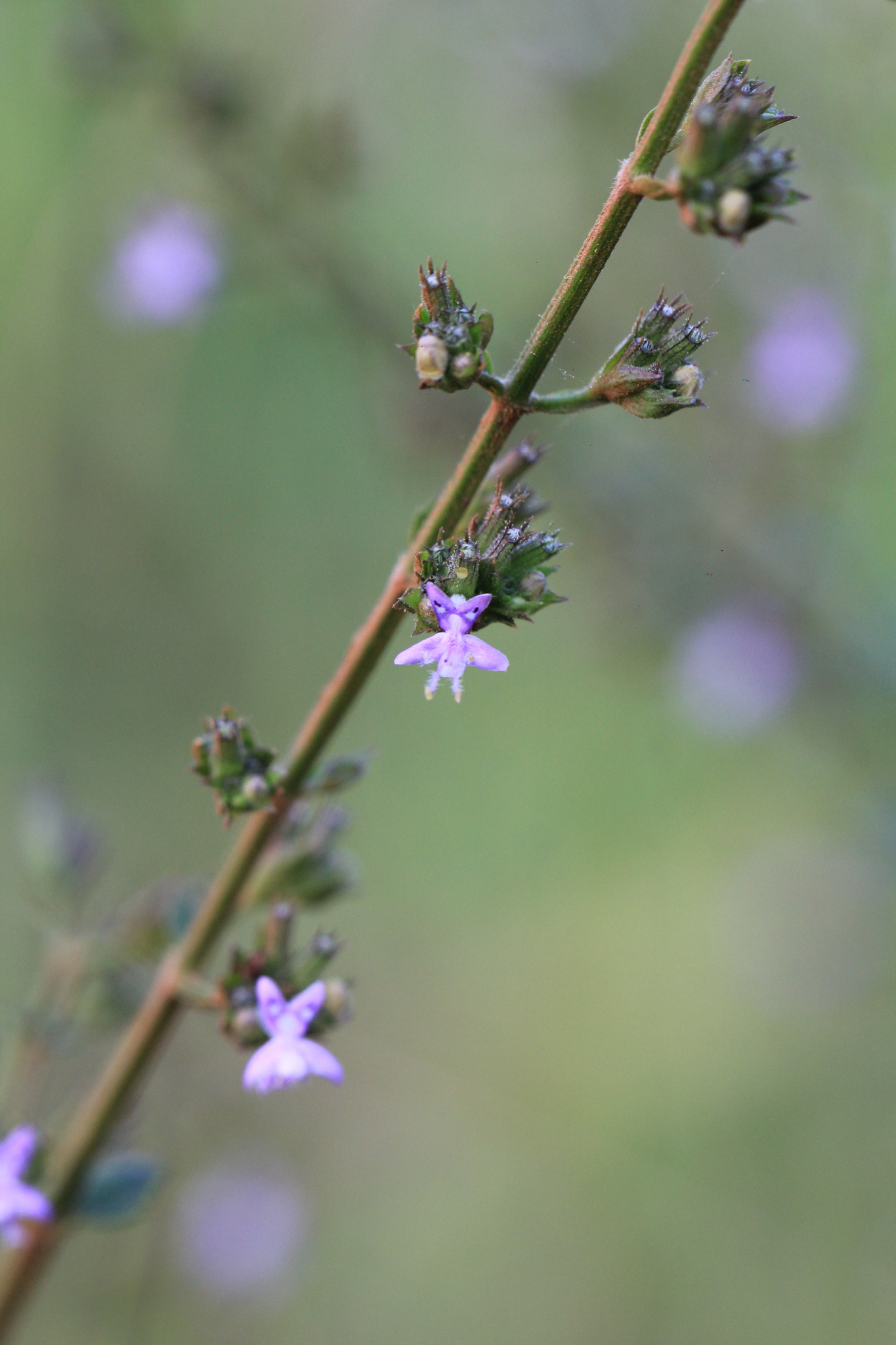

Scientific classification
- Kingdom: Plantae
- Clade: Tracheophytes
- Clade: Angiosperms
- Clade: Eudicots
- Clade: Asterids
- Order: Lamiales
- Family: Lamiaceae
- Genus: Condea
- Species: C. elegans

Binomial name
- Condea elegans (Briq.) Harley & J.F.B. Pastore 2012; Lectotype as syn. Satureja americana Poir.

Synonyms
- Eriope elegans Briquet 1889; Hyptis elegans (Briq.) Briquet 1897

= Condea elegans =

Species of flowering plant

Condea elegans is a species of flowering plants in the family Lamiaceae. It is found in South America (Argentina, Brazil, Paraguay). The type specimen is described from Paraguarí, Paraguay.
