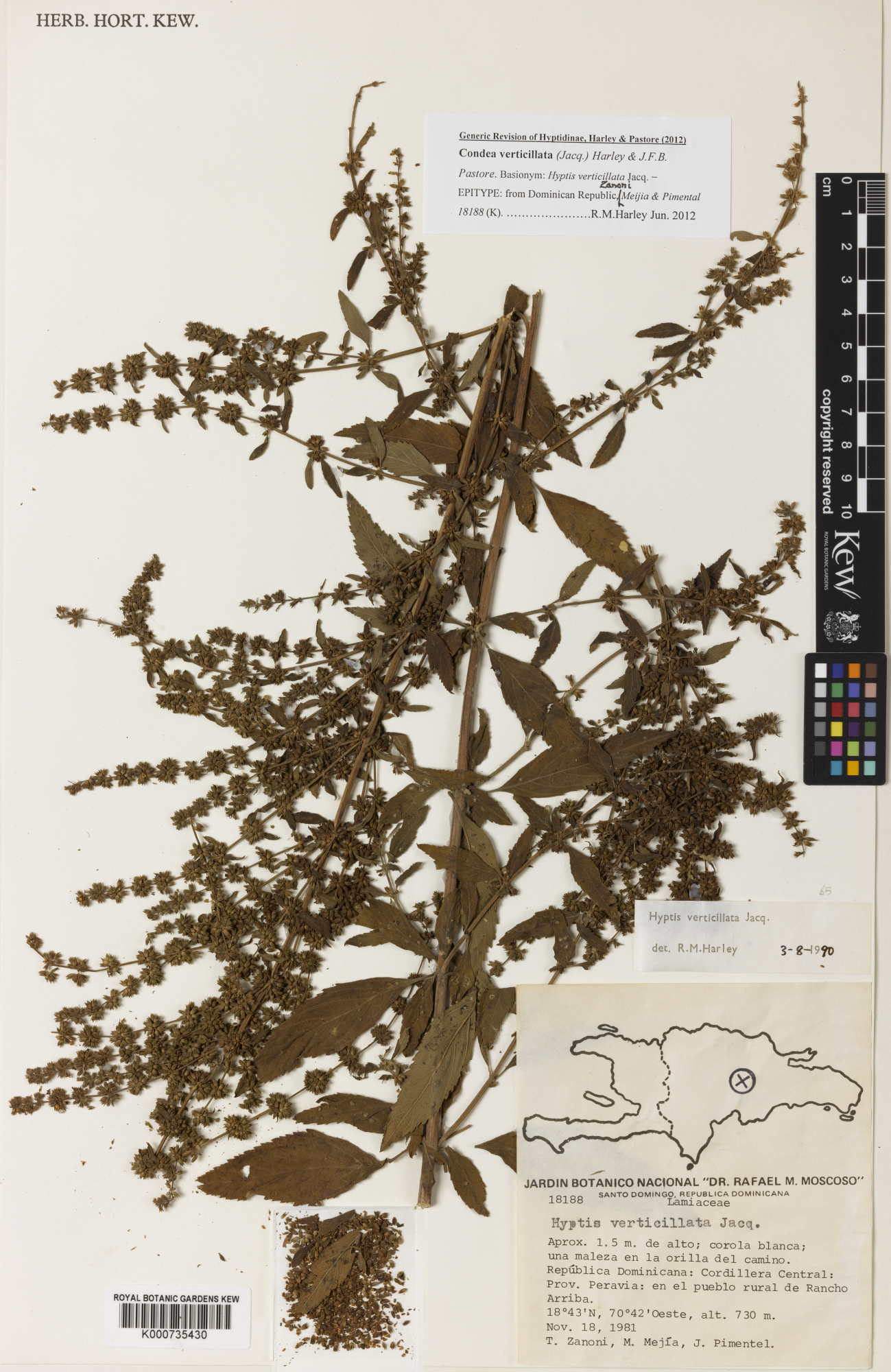
- Epitype of Condea verticillata

Conservation status
- Secure (NatureServe)

Scientific classification
- Kingdom: Plantae
- Clade: Tracheophytes
- Clade: Angiosperms
- Clade: Eudicots
- Clade: Asterids
- Order: Lamiales
- Family: Lamiaceae
- Genus: Condea
- Species: C. verticillata

Binomial name
- Condea verticillata (Jacq.) Harley & J.F.B.Pastor 2012

Synonyms
- Hyptis verticillata Jacquin 1787; Mesosphaerum verticillatum (Jacq.) Kuntze 1891

= Condea verticillata =

Species of flowering plant

Condea verticillata, commonly known as John Charles, or Marrubio is a species of flowering plant in the family Lamiaceae. It is found in Mexico, Florida, Central America, the Caribbean, and northwestern South America. It has also been introduced to Hawaii.

John Charles is used in traditional medicine to treat a variety of conditions including coughs, colds, fever, tonsillitis, bronchitis, uterine fibroids, skin infections, and stomach ache. The leaf and stem of the plant contain the lignan podophyllotoxin.
