= Bigelow Cholla Garden Wilderness =

Protected wilderness area in California, United States

- IUCN category Ib (wilderness area)
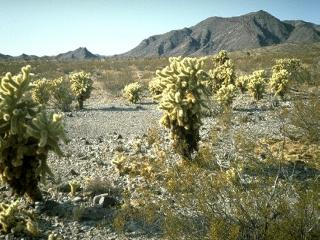

- Location within California Location within the United States
- Location: Mojave Desert, San Bernardino County, California
- Nearest city: Needles
- Coordinates: 34°50′08″N 114°53′23″W
- Area: 14,645 acres (59.27 km^{2})
- Established: 1994
- Governing body: Bureau of Land Management

The Bigelow Cholla Garden Wilderness is in the eastern Mojave Desert and within Mojave Trails National Monument, located in San Bernardino County, California.

== Geography ==
The wilderness lies in the northern end of the Sacramento Mountains, east of the Piute Mountains and 18 miles (29 km) west of Needles, California, along Interstate 40 as its northern border. The wilderness covers approximately 14,645 acres (5,927 ha). Elevations range from 1,400 to 3,314 feet (427 to 1,010 m) at the top of the Sacramento range's Bannock Peak.

== Flora and fauna ==
In the wilderness area the vegetation types are predominantly of the creosote bush scrub plant community. The densest concentration of Bigelow cholla (Cylindropuntia bigelovii) in all California's deserts is found within the wilderness area and the surrounding terrain.

Wildlife is typical for the Mojave Desert; including coyote, black-tailed jackrabbit, ground squirrel, kangaroo rat, quail, roadrunner, rattlesnakes, and several species of lizards. The area provides habitat for migrating desert bighorn sheep. The western half of the wilderness area provides critical habitat for the threatened desert tortoise.
