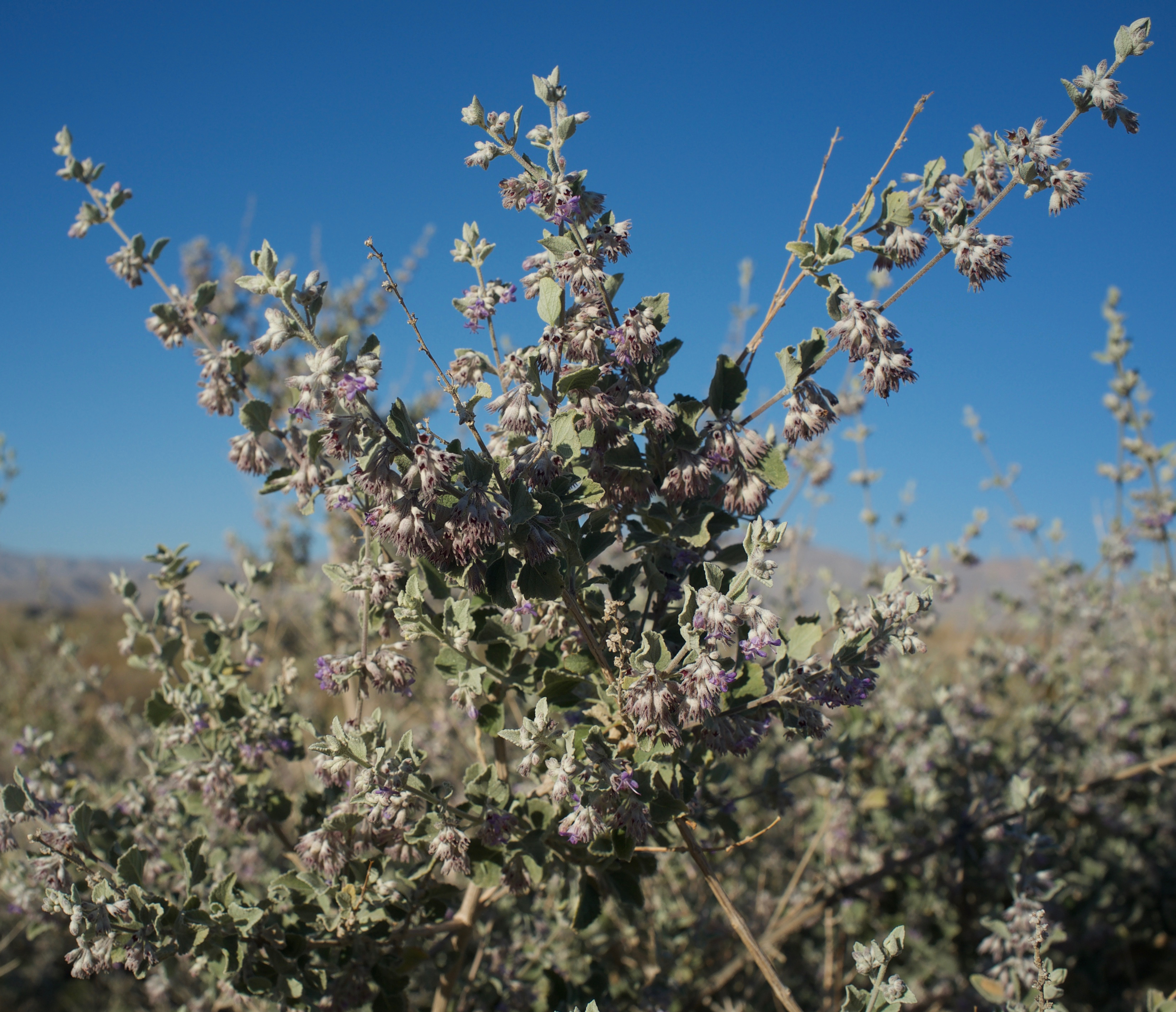
- Condea emoryi, desert lavender, Coachella Valley

Scientific classification
- Kingdom: Plantae
- Clade: Tracheophytes
- Clade: Angiosperms
- Clade: Eudicots
- Clade: Asterids
- Order: Lamiales
- Family: Lamiaceae
- Subfamily: Nepetoideae
- Tribe: Ocimeae
- Genus: Condea; Adans., 1763

Type species
- Condea americana (Poir.) Harley & J.F.B.Pastore, 2012; Lectotype as syn. Satureja americana Poir.

Species
- See text

= Condea =

Genus of flowering plants

Condea is a genus of flowering plants in the family Lamiaceae.

== Species ==
- Condea albida
- Condea americana
- Condea anitae
- Condea chyliantha
- Condea cubensis
- Condea decipiens
- Condea domingensis
- Condea elegans
- Condea emoryi
- Condea fastigiata
- Condea floribunda
- Condea iodantha
- Condea jacobi
- Condea laniflora
- Condea mixta
- Condea rivularis
- Condea scandens
- Condea scoparioides
- Condea subtilis
- Condea tafallae
- Condea tephrodes
- Condea thyrsiflora
- Condea tomentosa
- Condea trichopes
- Condea undulata
- Condea urbanii
- Condea verticillata
