= Sheep Hole Mountains =

Mountain range in California, United States

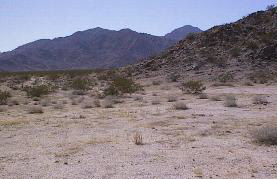
- Sheephole Mountains

Highest point
- Elevation: 1,057 m (3,468 ft)

Geography
- Location within California
- Country: United States
- State: California
- District: San Bernardino County
- Range coordinates: 34°11′38.009″N 115°39′18.968″W
- Topo map: USGS Dale Lake

The Sheep Hole Mountains are a mountain range in the Mojave Desert, to the north of Joshua Tree National Park, in San Bernardino County, California. The mountains were once Chemehuevi hunting grounds.

The mountain range lies between the Bullion Mountains to the west, and the Coxcomb Mountains to the east. The mountains reach an elevation of 4,613 feet (1,406 meters) above sea level just east of Amboy Road, which the range crosses.

== Sheephole Valley Wilderness Area ==
The Bureau of Land Management designated and manages the Sheephole Valley Wilderness Area which is within the mountain range and Mojave Trails National Monument. The 194,861-acre (approximate) Sheephole Valley Wilderness is a perfect representation of the basin and range topography typical in the Mojave Desert. The area consists of the northwest to southeast trending granitic boulder strewn Sheep Hole and Calumet Mountains, and is adjacent to the northern boundary of Joshua Tree National Park.
