= Danby, California =

Unincorporated community in California, United States

Danby
- Ghost Town
- Location in California
- Coordinates: 34°38′08″N 115°20′53″W
- Country: United States
- State: California
- County: San Bernardino
- Elevation: 1,350 ft (410 m)
- Time zone: UTC−8 (Pacific Time Zone)
  - Summer (DST): UTC−7 (PDT)
- Area codes: 442/760
- FIPS code: 06-17960
- GNIS feature ID: 252880

Danby is a ghost town in San Bernardino County, California, United States. Danby is located along the Santa Fe Railroad near historic Route 66, 9 miles (14 km) southwest of Essex. It lies at an elevation of 1,345 ft (410 m). The town was originally founded in 1883. Danby is located along the BNSF Railroad just south of Route 66 on Danby Rd, 9 miles southwest of Essex. As of 2015, this stretch of Route 66 remains closed due to prior flash floods.
