= Old Woman meteorite =

Meteorite found in California, USA

Coordinates: 34°34′50.33″N 115°13′39.1″W

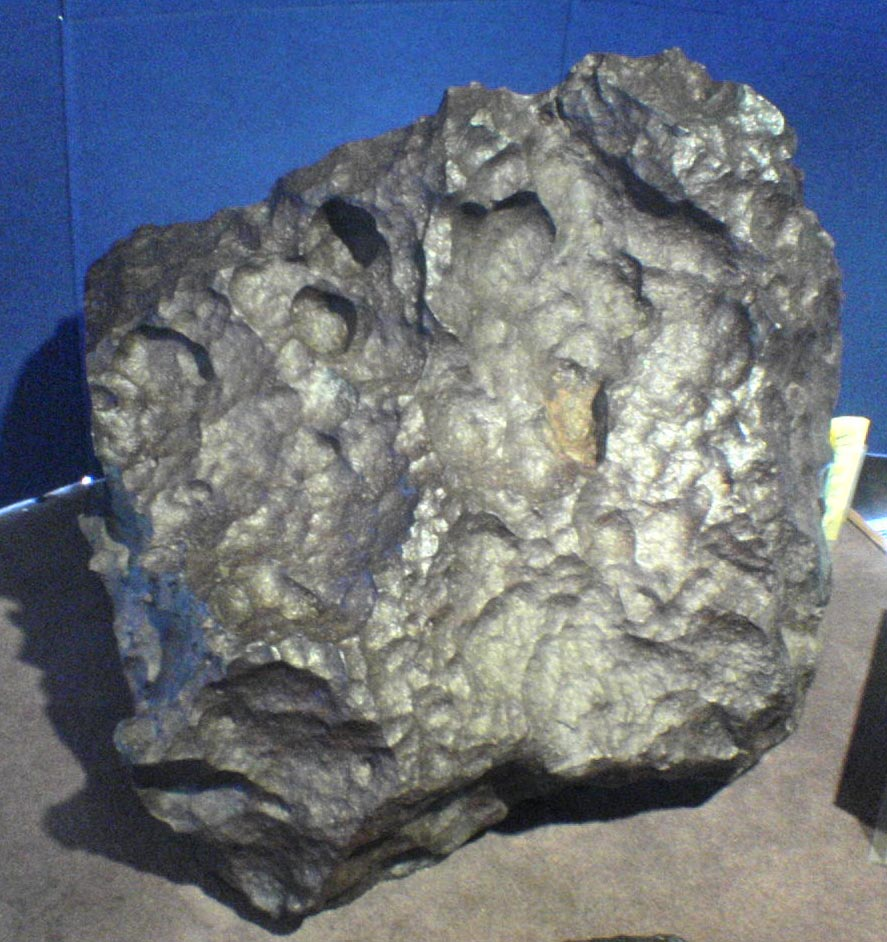
- Old Woman Meteorite.
- Group: IIAB
- Country: United States
- Region: Old Woman Mountains, California
- Observed fall: No
- Found date: 1975
- Related media on Wikimedia Commons

The Old Woman Meteorite is the largest meteorite to have been found in California and the second largest in the United States. It was discovered in the Old Woman Mountains in southern California in late March 1976. It is 38 inches (970 mm) long, 34 inches (860 mm) high, and 30 inches (760 mm) wide. The meteorite is mostly composed of iron, but also contains nickel (about 6%), as well as small amounts of chromium, cobalt, phosphorus, and sulfur.

The main mass was put on display in the Smithsonian Institution from 1978 to 1980, and now resides in the Desert Discovery Center in Barstow, California. It originally weighed 6,070 pounds (2,750 kg), but has since had a 942-pound (427 kg) slice removed for scientific study. A 177.4-pound (80.5 kg) slab is on display in the UCLA meteorite gallery.

The iron meteorite was discovered by two prospectors, Mike Jendruczak and David Friberg who, along with a third partner, filed a placer claim on the area where the meteorite was found. The Smithsonian Institution disputed their claim of ownership of the meteorite, so the claim-stakers filed a lawsuit. The Smithsonian went forward with moving the meteorite off of the mountain with the help of the United States Marine Corps (using a helicopter and cargo net), and it was taken to a Bureau of Land Management (BLM) facility for storage during the lengthy court proceedings. After the courts ruled in favor of the U.S. Government, the Secretary of the Interior decreed that, although the Smithsonian was the legally designated curator of the public's meteorite, it would be placed on long-term loan and displayed in California.

== See also ==
- Glossary of meteoritics
