= Mojave Trails National Monument =

National monument in California, United States

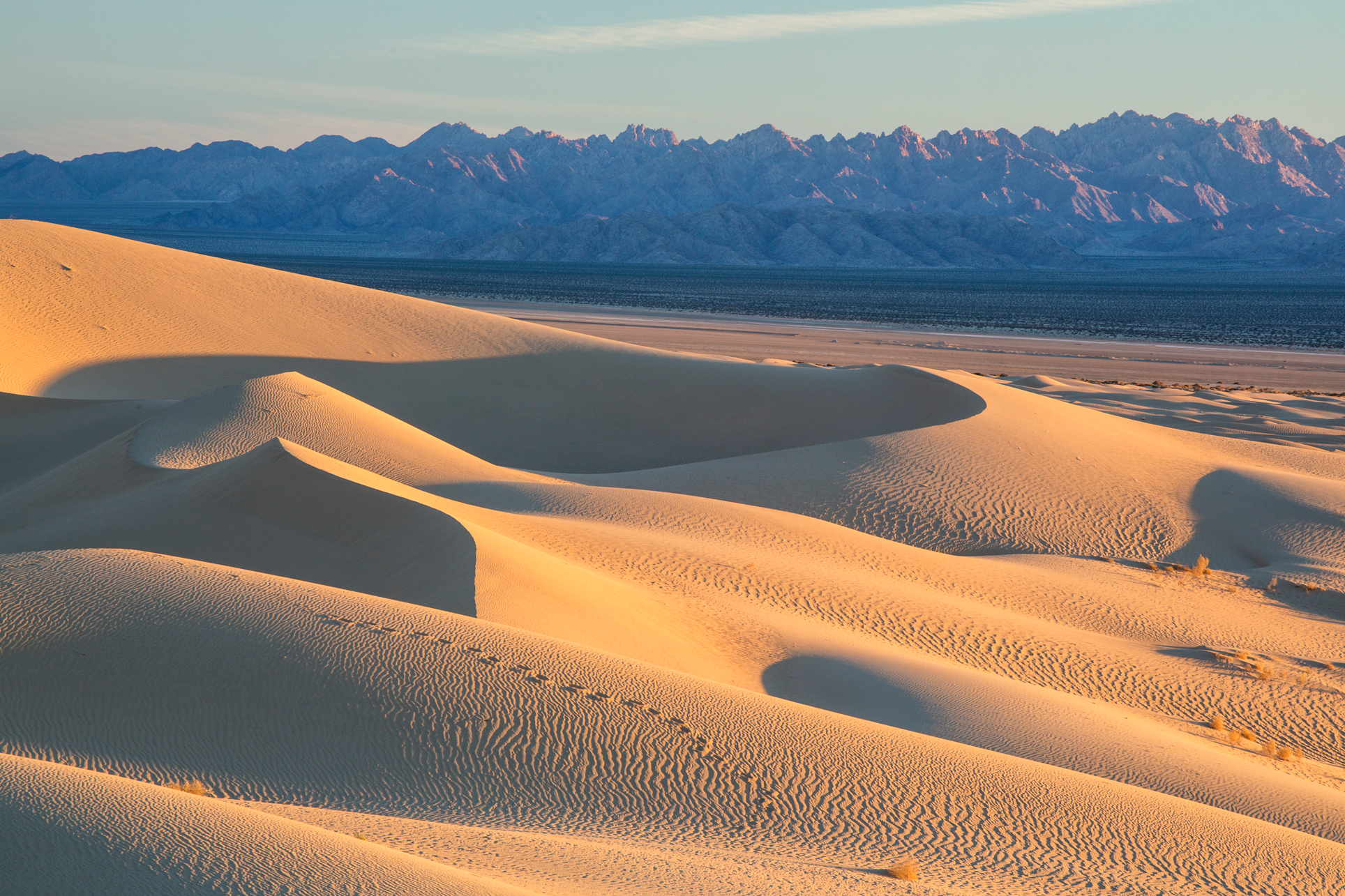
- Cadiz Dunes, Mojave Trails NM

- Location within southern California Location within California Location within the United States
- Interactive map of Mojave Trails National Monument
- Location: San Bernardino County, California, U.S.
- Coordinates: 34°36′N 116°00′W
- Area: 1,600,000 acres (650,000 ha)
- Authorized: February 12, 2016
- Governing body: Bureau of Land Management
- Website: Mojave Trails National Monument

U.S. National Monument

Mojave Trails National Monument is a large U.S. National Monument located in the state of California between Interstates 15 and 40. The park was created to preserve a wide variety of geological and cultural features including several titular trails - the Old Spanish Trail, the World War II-era Desert Training Center and Route 66. It partially surrounds the Mojave National Preserve. It was designated by President Barack Obama on February 12, 2016, along with Castle Mountains National Monument and Sand to Snow National Monument, also in southern California. It is under the administration of the Bureau of Land Management.

== Features ==
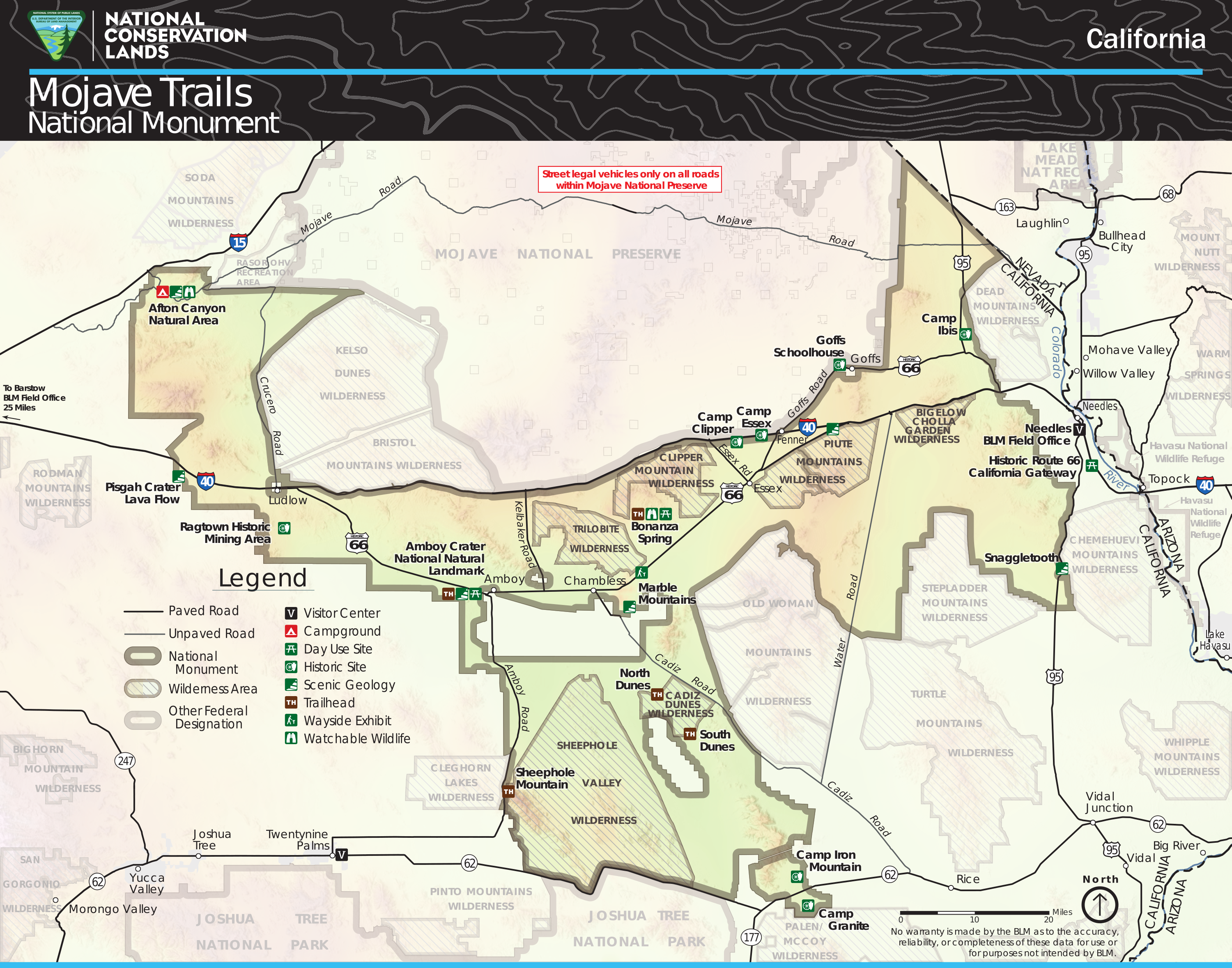
Map of Mojave Trails National Monument in 2017

Mojave Trails National Monument is the largest national monument in the contiguous United States and is almost entirely undeveloped. Like the adjacent Mojave National Preserve, Mojave Trails National Monument contains numerous desert mountain ranges, volcanic features, and sand dunes.

The most visited area in Mojave Trails National Monument is Amboy Crater, a dormant cinder cone volcano, which was a popular sight for travelers in the heyday of U.S. Route 66 from the 1920s to the 1960s.

Another area with developed recreation facilities is Afton Canyon, one of only two places where the 140-mile long Mojave River continuously flows above the ground. Afton Canyon has steep rock walls that earned it the nickname “Grand Canyon of the Mojave”.

One of the most remote areas in the monument consists of the nearly pristine Cadiz Dunes, which are orange-pink in color and almost entirely unvegetated. This dune field formed from the sand of dry lake beds. Bonanza Spring, an important water resource, and Bonanza Springs Wildlife Area is also located in the National Monument.

Cultural resources in Mojave Trails National Monument include 105 miles of historic U.S. Route 66, between Needles and Ludlow, California, the longest remaining undeveloped stretch of Route 66, as well as some of the best preserved sites from the World War II-era Desert Training Center.

The BLM's potential restriction on rock collecting is opposed by rockhounds.

=== Wilderness Areas ===
Several wilderness areas lie within the monument.

- Bigelow Cholla Garden
- Cadiz Dunes
- Clipper Mountain
- Piute Mountains
- Sheephole Valley
- Trilobite

== See also ==
- List of national monuments of the United States
