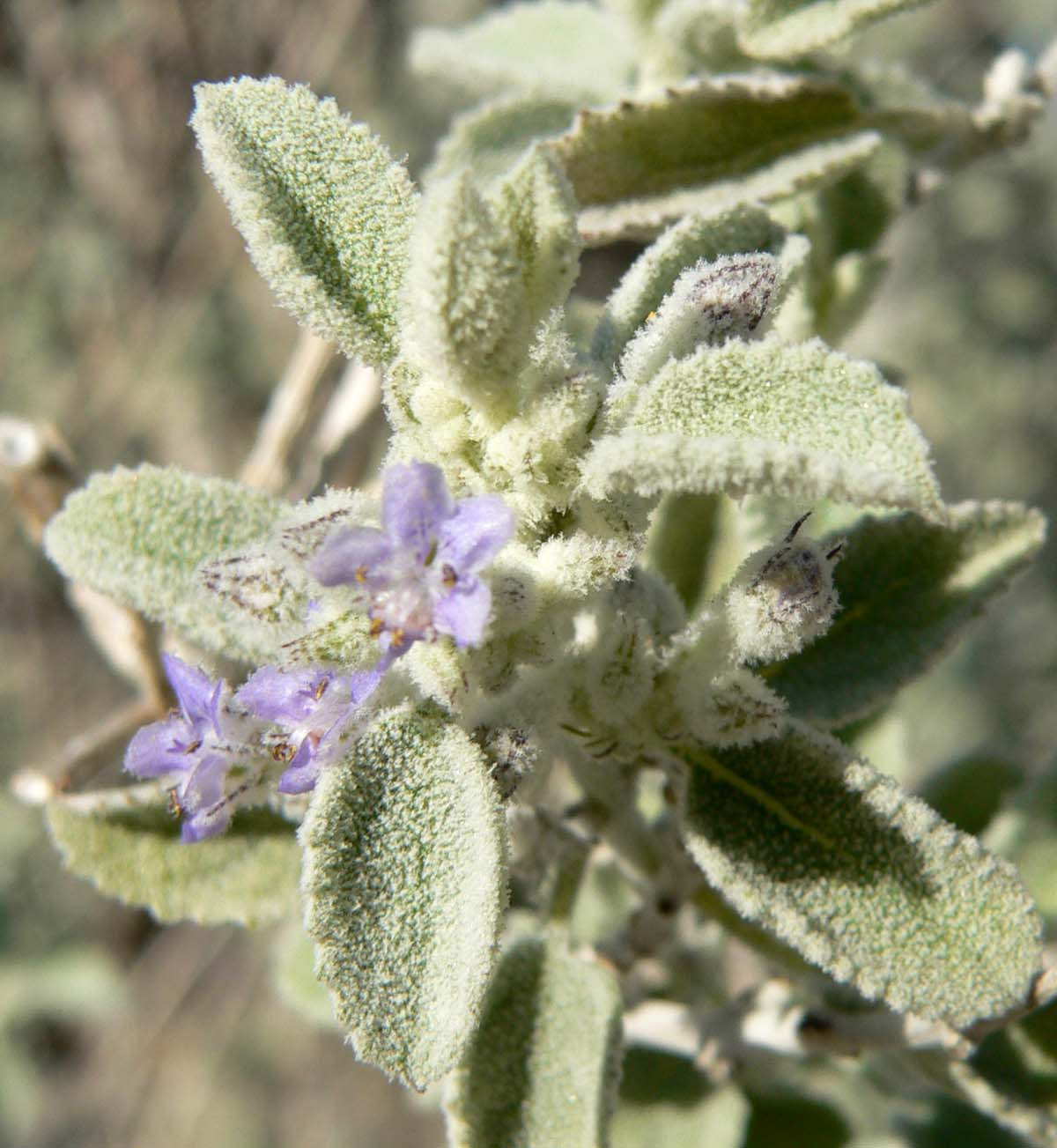
- Condea emoryi–terminal flower

Conservation status
- Secure (NatureServe)

Scientific classification
- Kingdom: Plantae
- Clade: Tracheophytes
- Clade: Angiosperms
- Clade: Eudicots
- Clade: Asterids
- Order: Lamiales
- Family: Lamiaceae
- Genus: Condea
- Species: C. emoryi

Binomial name
- Condea emoryi Torr.

= Condea emoryi =

Species of flowering plant

Condea emoryi (synonym Hyptis emoryi), the desert lavender, is a large, multi-stemmed shrub species of flowering plant in Lamiaceae, the mint family.

It is one of the favored plants of honeybees in early spring in the southwest deserts of North America.

== Description ==
Desert lavender is a medium to tall cold tender perennial shrub found in the southwestern United States in Arizona, Nevada, California, and northwestern Mexico in Sonora and Baja California.

It is a multi-stemmed shrub reaching 8–12 ft in optimum locations. It has violet-blue flowers up to 1 in, in leaf axils. The flowers are profuse along the main stem and side branches and is an aromatic attractor of the honeybee and other species. Leaves are oval and a whitish gray-green-(in deserts), serrated margins, hairy, and 2–3 in. It is found in dry washes, and on rocky slopes, up to 3280 ft (1000 m). It is evergreen or cold deciduous, depending on location.

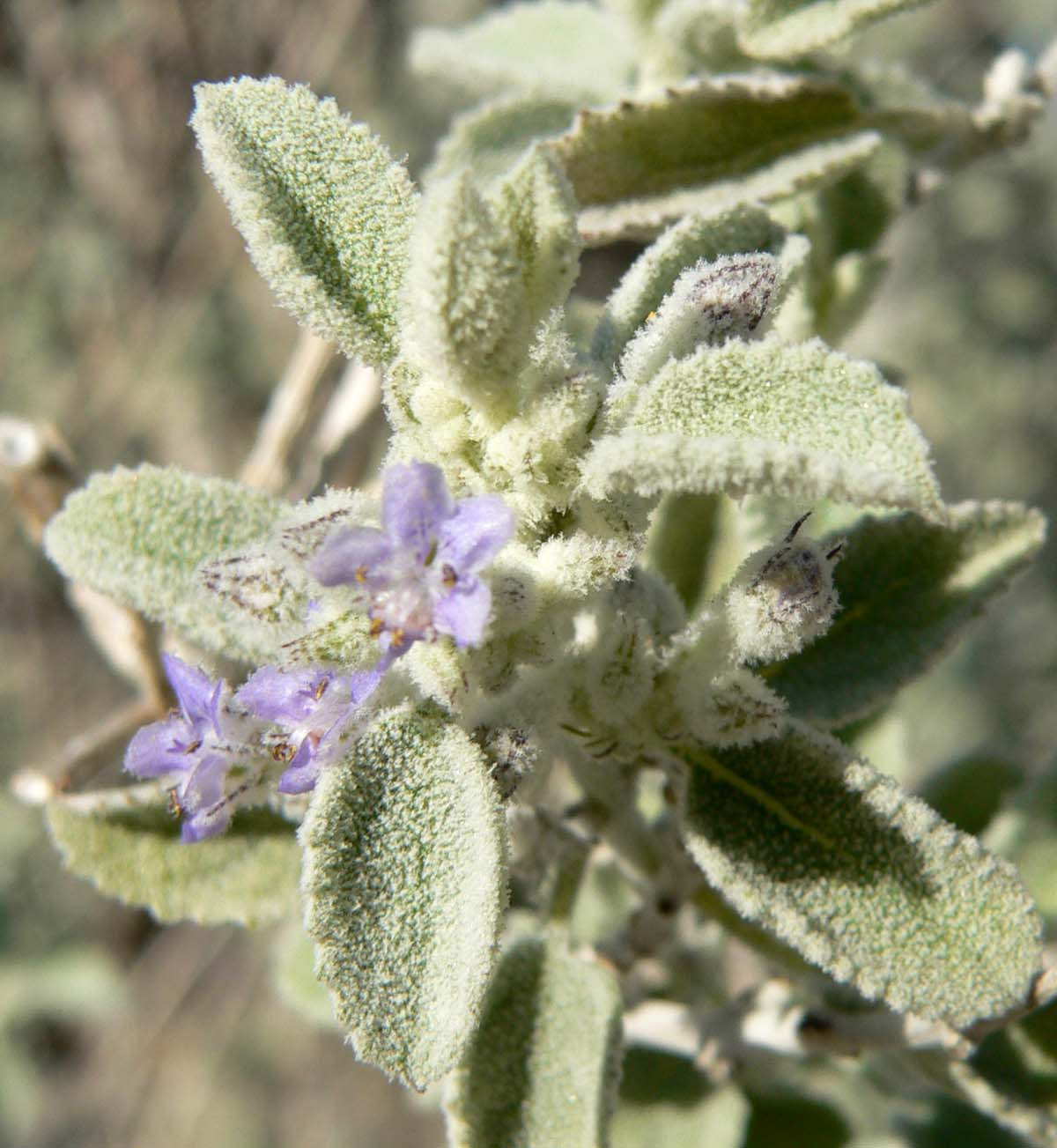
Hyptis emoryi at Santa Rosa Mountains

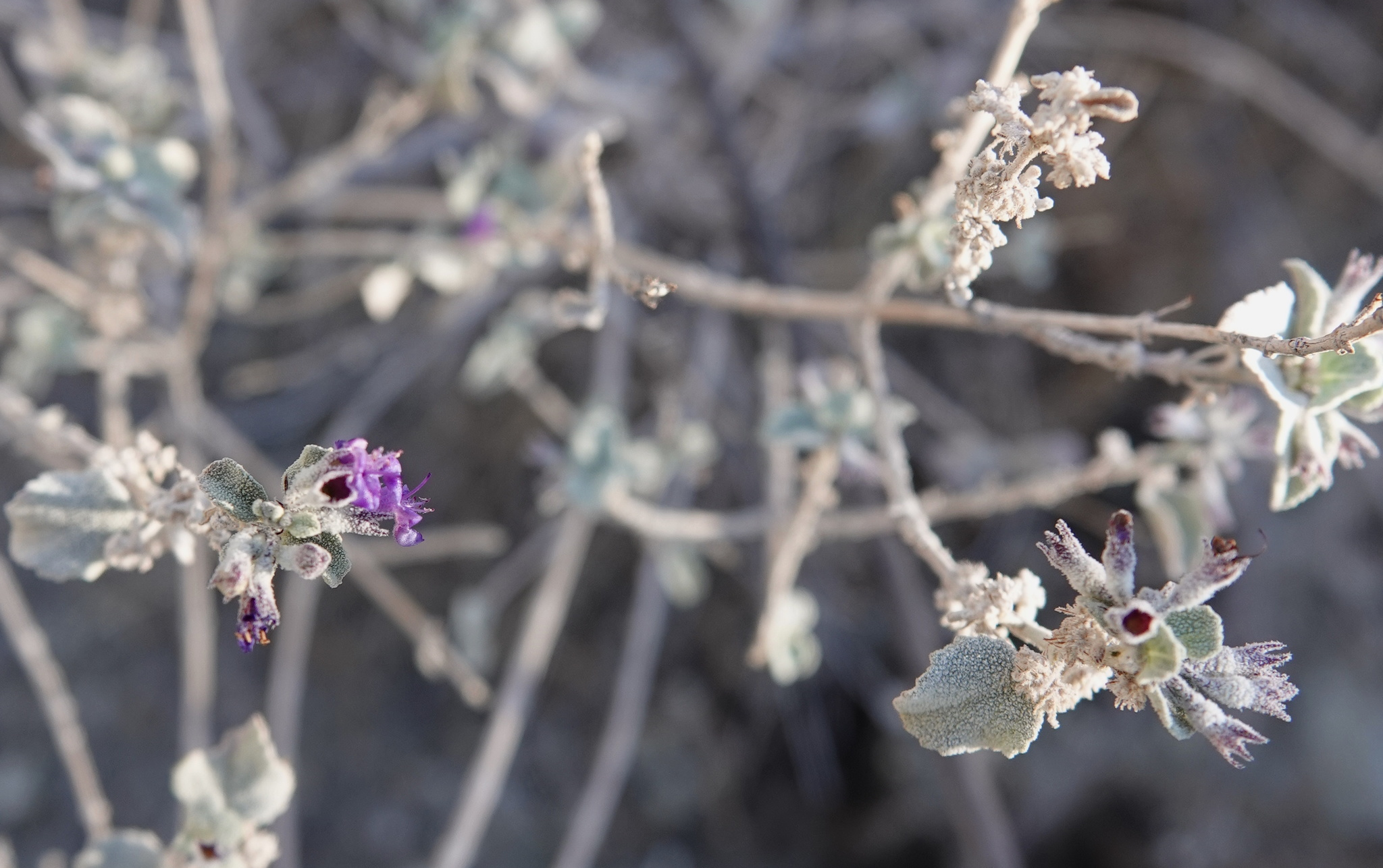
Hyptis emoryi

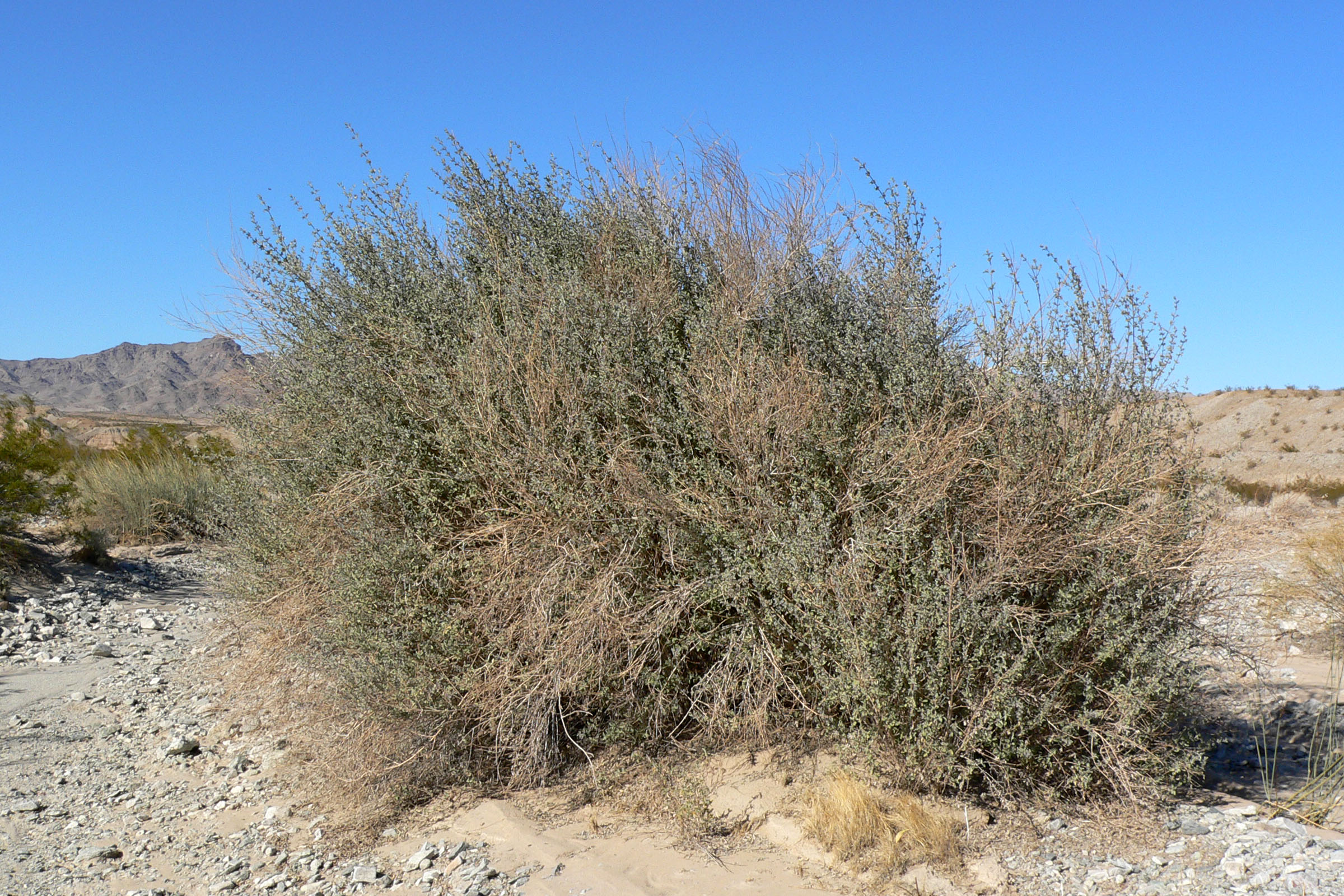
Hyptis emoryi in wash east of the Dead Mountains

== Taxonomy ==
Hyptis was demonstrated to be polyphyletic on the basis of evidence from nuclear and plastid DNA. The new circumscription excluded Hyptis emoryi, which was transferred to Condea.

== Distribution and habitat ==
It occurs mostly in areas with a water source; in the southwestern US deserts it is commonly in the dry washes, intermixed with other species.

In the "creosote bush scrub" Yuma Desert-(western Sonoran Desert) of southwest Arizona, it is found with the palo verde, Bebbia, Encelia farinosa, desert ironwood (Olneya tesota), Lycium andersonii (wolfberry or Anderson thornbush), Psorothamnus spinosus (a type of smoke tree), and Acacia greggii, as some common associated species of the washes, elevation dependent.

In Arizona, found from central to southwestern Arizona of the Sonoran Desert; in northwest Arizona found in regions of the Mojave Desert. In southern California and Nevada, desert lavender is found in southern regions of the Mojave Desert and the Colorado Desert of southeast California.

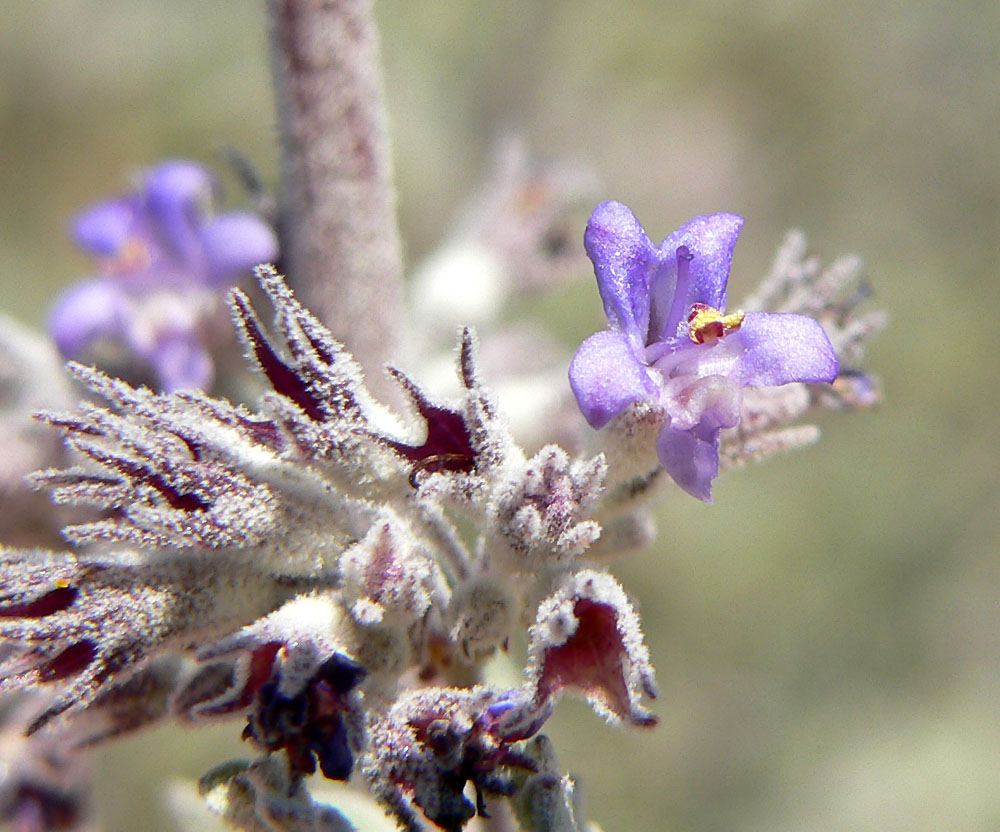
Hyptis emoryi in wash east of the Dead Mountains

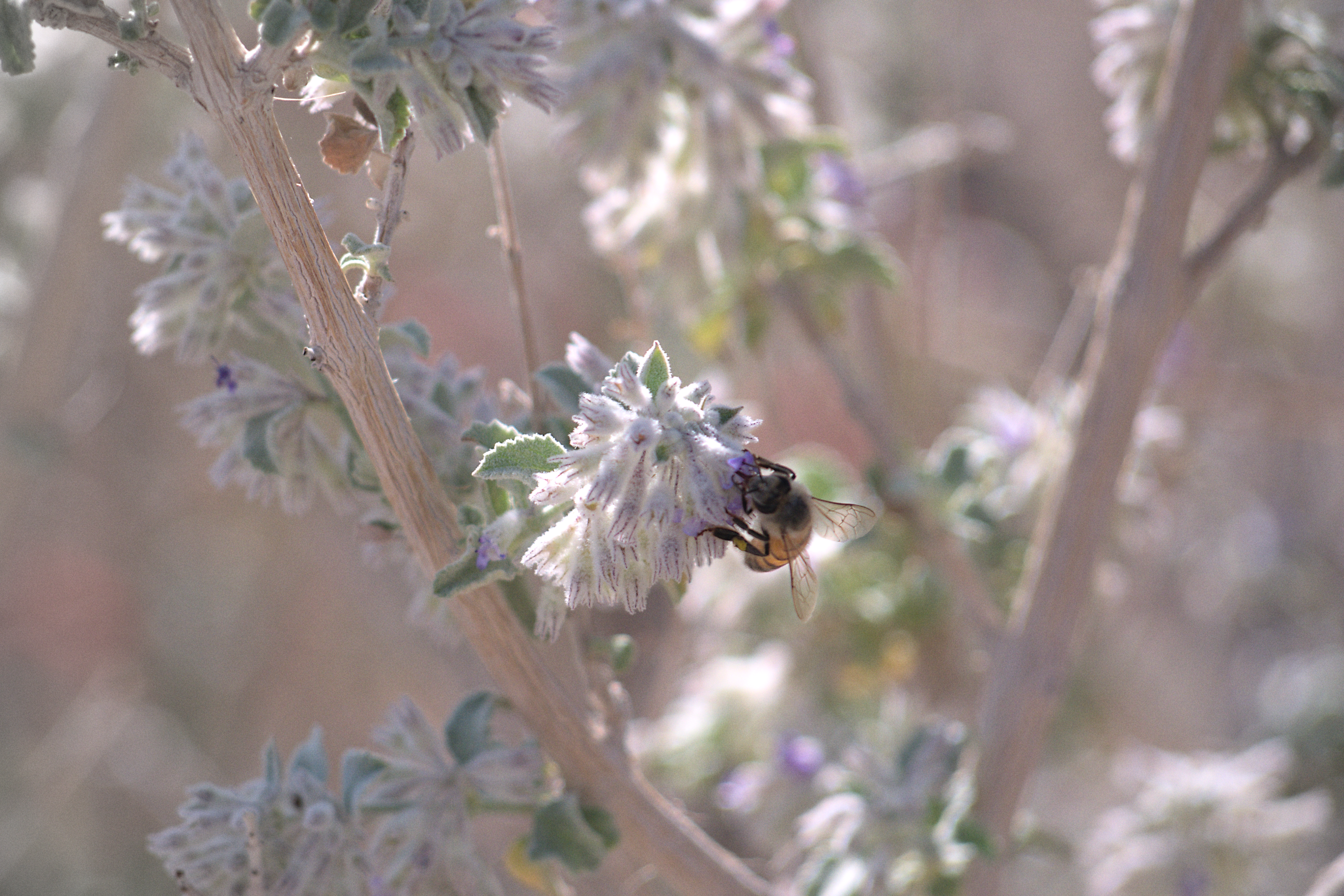
Apis mellifera in Anza Borrego Desert on Hyptis emoryi

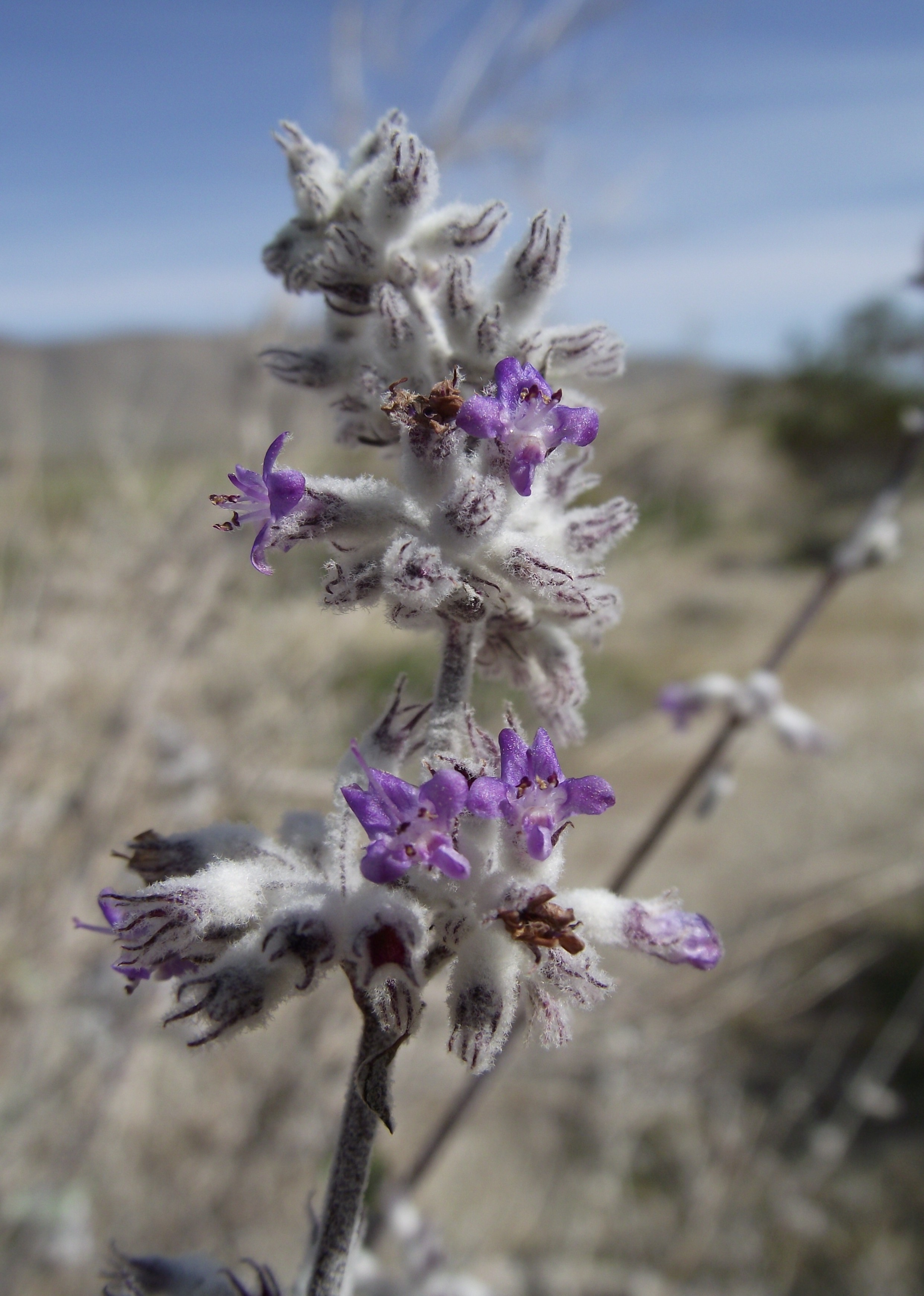
Hyptis emoryi in Anza Borrego Desert State Park
