= Old Woman Mountains =

Mountain range in California, United States

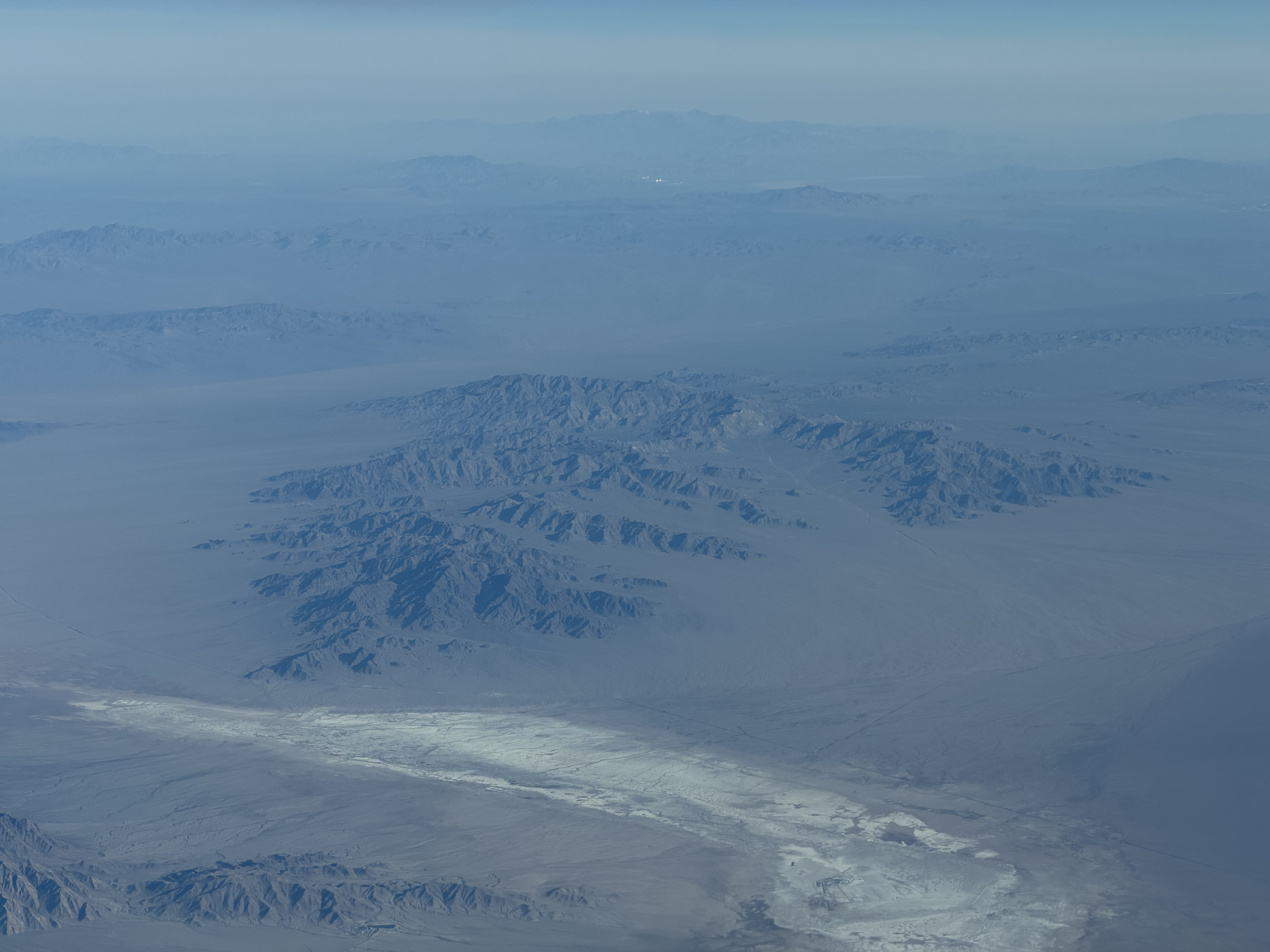
- The Old Woman Mountains from 38,000ft from the south

Highest point
- Elevation: 1,623 m (5,325 ft)

Geography
- Location within California
- Country: United States
- State: California
- Region: Mojave Desert
- District: San Bernardino County
- Range coordinates: 34°27′0″N 115°12′3″W
- Topo map: USGS Sheep Camp Spring

The Old Woman Mountains are located south of the town of Essex, California, and north of Danby Dry Lake. The range reaches an elevation of 5,325 feet (1,623 m) at the west end (Old Woman Mountain), and lies in San Bernardino County in the Mojave Desert.

== Geography ==
The mountain range is approximately 15 miles (24 km) wide east to west at the widest point, and 25 miles (40 km) in length from north to south. The mountains receive very little precipitation, with just 4-10 inches of rain falling in a normal year. The Old Woman Statue, a prominent rock formation, is found on the eastern side of the range about two miles (3 km) south of Paramount Spring.

== Old Woman Mountains Wilderness Area ==
The Old Woman Mountains Wilderness Area, with many natural features, protects much of the range for recreation.

== Flora and fauna ==
The lower elevations of the range are dominated by Creosote bush scrub, with juniper-pinyon woodland found in the higher elevations. The dry washes are characterized by catclaw acacia, cheesebush, desert lavender, little-leaf ratany, and desert almond.

Animals found in the mountains include: bighorn sheep, mule deer, bobcats, cougars, coyotes, black-tailed jackrabbits, ground squirrels, kangaroo rats, and several species of lizards.

Numerous raptor species are likely to be found in the area; including prairie falcons, red-tailed hawks, golden eagles, Cooper's hawks, American kestrels, as well as several species of owls. The washes and canyons provide good habitat for several species of songbirds, and the bird densities and diversity is further enhanced by the presence of the known 24 springs and seeps.

== History ==
The mountains were the discovery site of the Old Woman Meteorite, the largest meteorite ever found in the state. The meteorite is now on display at the Desert Information Center in Barstow, California.
