= California Coast Ranges =

Mountain range

California Coast Range
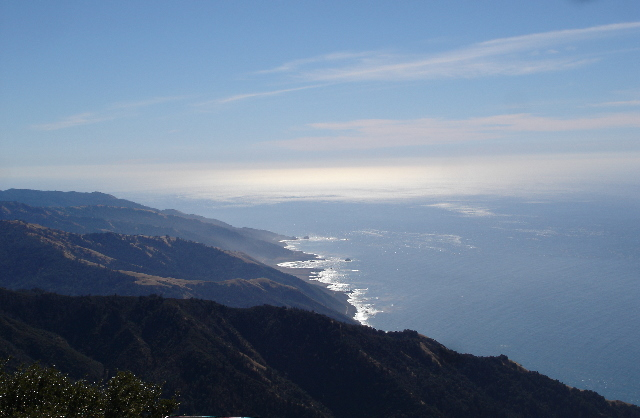
- Santa Lucia Range

Highest point
- Peak: Mount Linn
- Elevation: 8,098 ft (2,468 m)

Dimensions
- Length: 400 mi (640 km)

Geography
- Country: United States
- State: California
- Parent range: Pacific Coast Ranges

The Coast Ranges of California span 400 miles (644 km) from Del Norte or Humboldt County, California, south to Santa Barbara County. The other three coastal California mountain ranges are the Transverse Ranges, Peninsular Ranges and the Klamath Mountains.

Physiographically, they are a section of the larger Pacific Border province, which in turn is part of the larger Pacific Mountain System physiographic division. UNESCO has included the "California Coast Ranges Biosphere Reserve" in its Man and the Biosphere Programme of World Network of Biosphere Reserves since 1983.

== Physiography ==
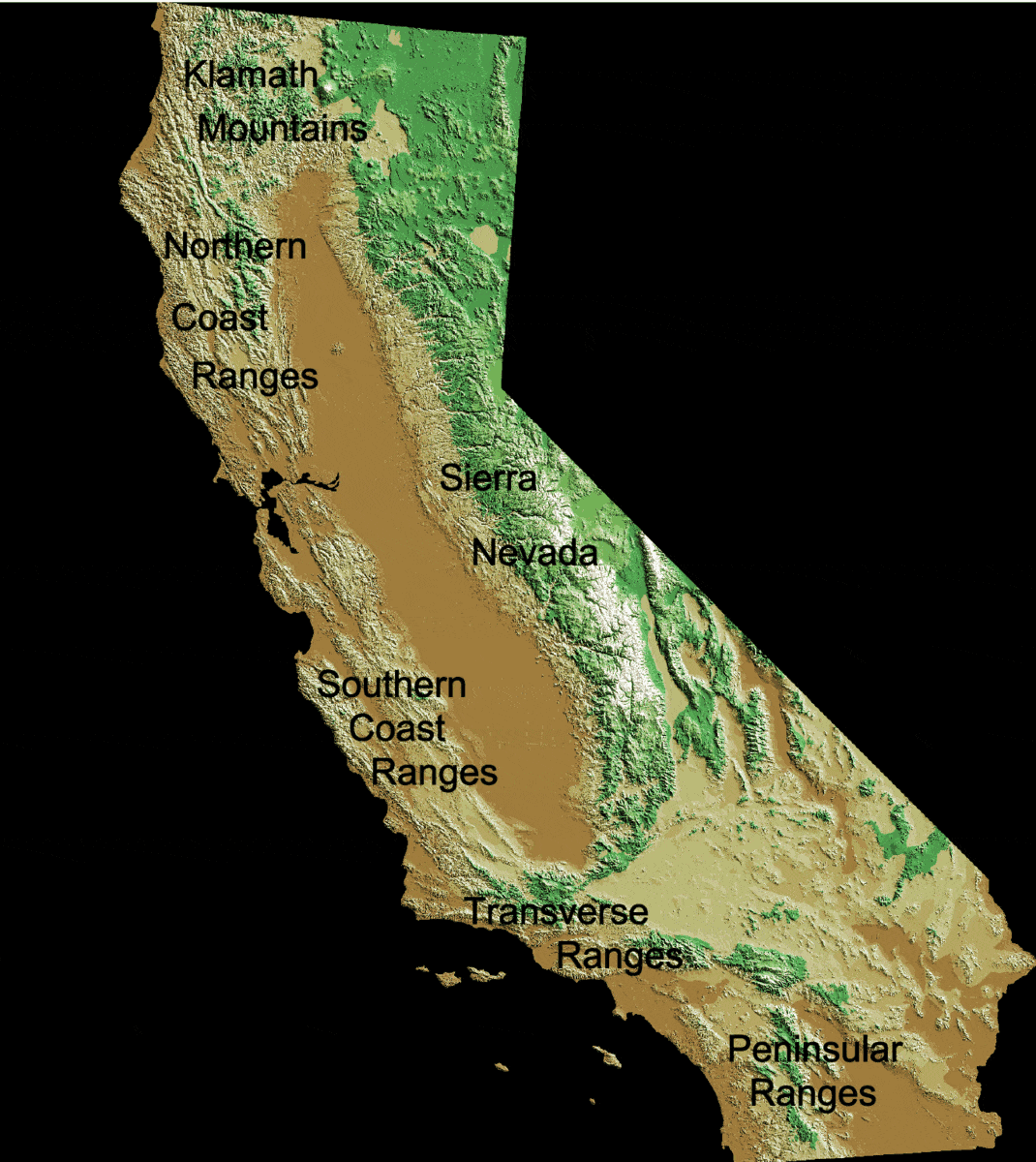
Northern and Southern Coast Ranges and other major mountain ranges of California

The northern end of the California Coast Ranges overlap the southern end of the Klamath Mountains for approximately 80 miles (130 km) on the west. They extend southward for more than 60 miles (97 km) to where the coastline turns eastward along the Santa Barbara Channel, around the area of Point Conception. Here the southern end meets the Los Angeles Transverse Ranges, or Sierras de los Angeles. The rocks themselves that comprise the mountains are of a great variety and widely varying geologic ages. Most of the rocks were formed during the Tertiary, Cretaceous and Jurassic periods. Most were deposited on the sea bottom as sediments, but in many places also had cracks, crevices and other gaps infused with molten lava or other masses of igneous rock, which were forced in molten condition into the sedimentary rocks. All of the range has been folded and faulted during several periods, with erosion of the softer rock giving much of the current appearance.

== Mineralogy ==
The California Ranges had a high production of mercury following the discovery of gold in the Sierra Nevada. In the Cache Creek Basin, Cenozoic cinnabar deposits near Clear Lake are the northernmost of a group of similar deposits associated with volcanism and migration of a transform fault system. During 1877, these deposits hit their peak production of mercury, producing approximately 2,776 metric tons (3,060 short tons). These abandoned mines are still a source of mine waste runoff in Cache Creek and other downstream bodies of water.

== Northern Coast Ranges ==
The Northern Coast Ranges are a section of the California Coast Ranges. They run parallel to the Pacific Coast from the North San Francisco Bay Area to coastal Del Norte County. The Klamath Mountains, including the Siskiyou Mountains sub-range, lie to the north and northeast. The Southern Coast Ranges lie to the south.

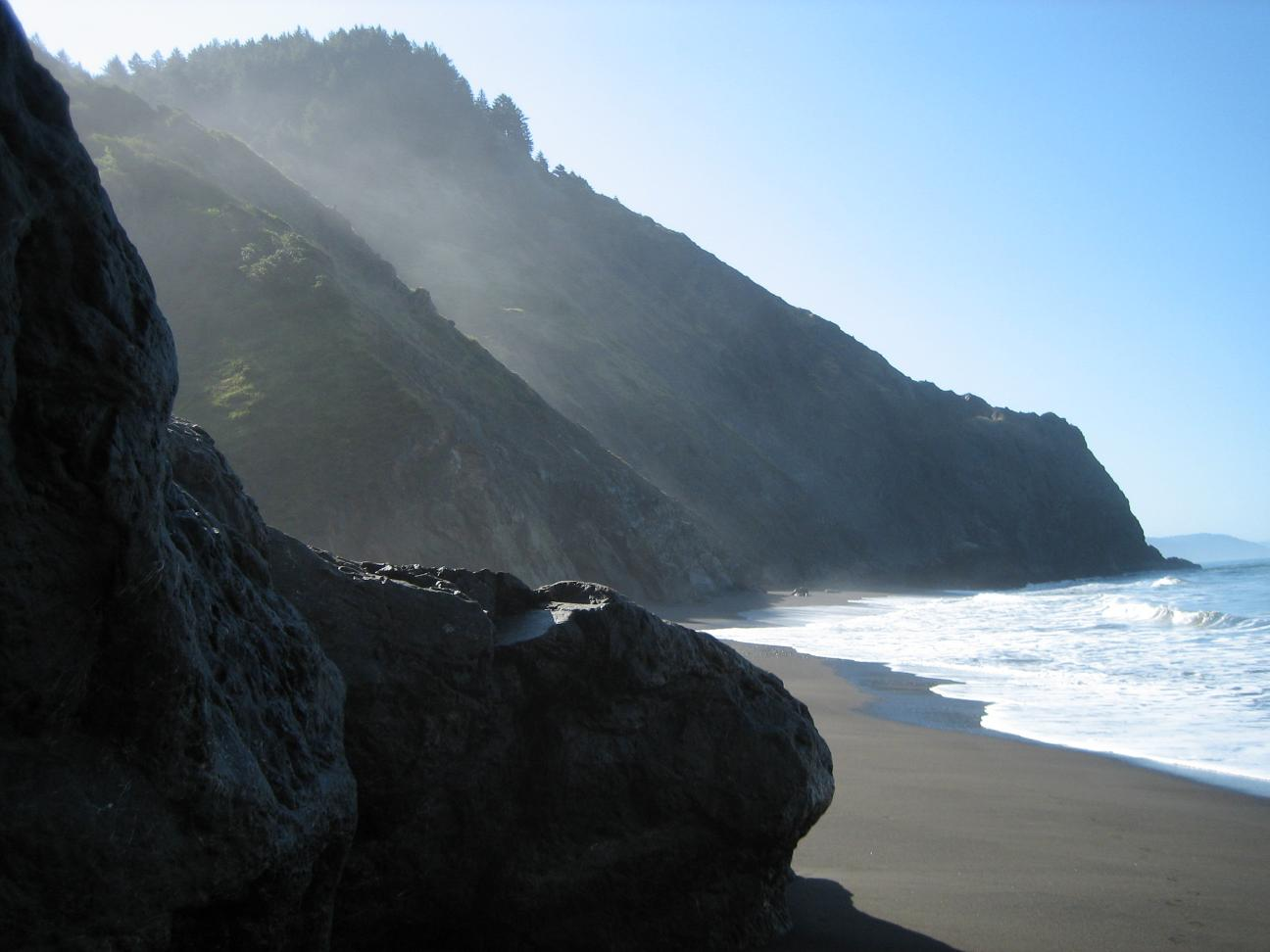
Outer Northern Coast Ranges: King Range meets the sea on the Lost Coast.

=== Geography ===
The Northern Coast Ranges run north–south parallel to the coast. Component ranges within the Northern Coast Ranges include the Mendocino Range of western Mendocino County and the Mayacamas, Sonoma, and Vaca Mountains and the Marin Hills of the North Bay.

They also include the King Range, which meet the sea in the "Lost Coast" region. The southernmost peak of the Northern Coast Ranges is Mount Tamalpais.

The highest point in the Northern Coast Ranges is Mount Linn, at 8,098 ft. (2,468 m).

=== Outer and Inner ranges ===
The Northern Coast Ranges consist of two main parallel belts of mountains, the Outer Northern Coast Ranges lying along the coast, and the Inner Northern Coast Ranges running inland to the east. They are separated by a long system of valleys. The northern valley portion is drained by the Eel River and its tributaries, and the southern by the Russian River. A series of short rivers, including the Mattole, Gualala, and Navarro rivers, drain the western slopes of the ranges. The eastern slopes of the ranges drain into the Sacramento Valley. Clear Lake lies in the southeast portion of the range, and drains eastward via Cache Creek.

U.S. Route 101 runs generally north–south in the valleys between the Outer and Inner Northern Coast Ranges.

=== Natural history ===
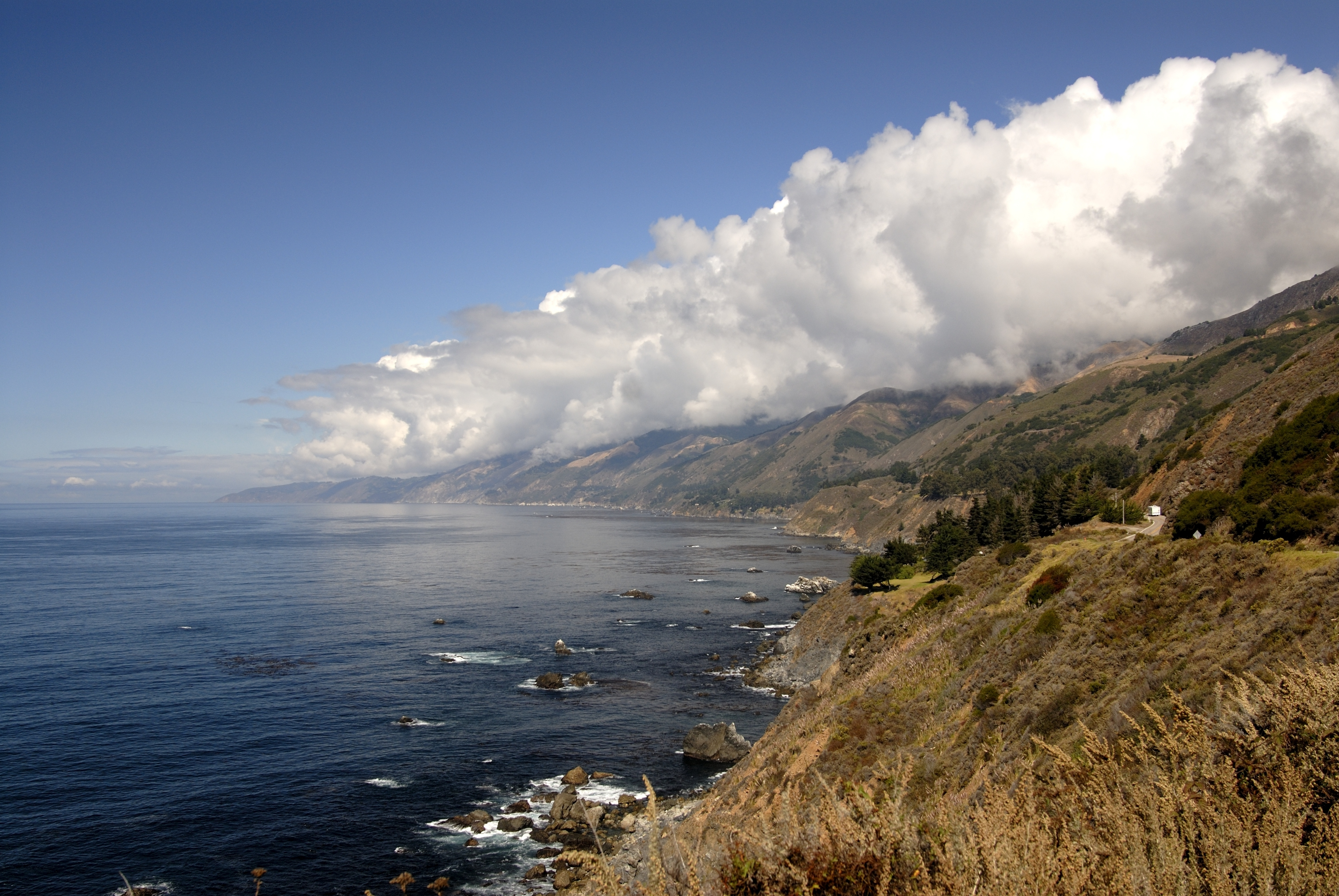
Orographic lift of moist air coming off ocean produces clouds along the Santa Lucia Range, of the California Coast Ranges System - NOAA

The seaward face of the coastal Outer Northern Coast Ranges is part of the Northern California coastal forests ecoregion, home to lush forests of Coast Redwood and Coast Douglas-fir.

The inland and dryer Inner Northern Coast Ranges are part of the California chaparral and woodlands ecoregion, home to a number of plant communities including: mixed evergreen forest; oak woodland; and Interior chaparral and woodland. A major specific plant community of the inner ranges is Mediterranean California Lower Montane Black Oak-Conifer Forest, which supports particularly high biodiversity within the California Coast Ranges, including the nominate California Black Oak.

Columbian Black-tailed Deer are the most widespread large mammal, after humans, of the Northern Coast Ranges. The rivers in the ranges are home to several species of salmon.

== Southern Coast Ranges ==
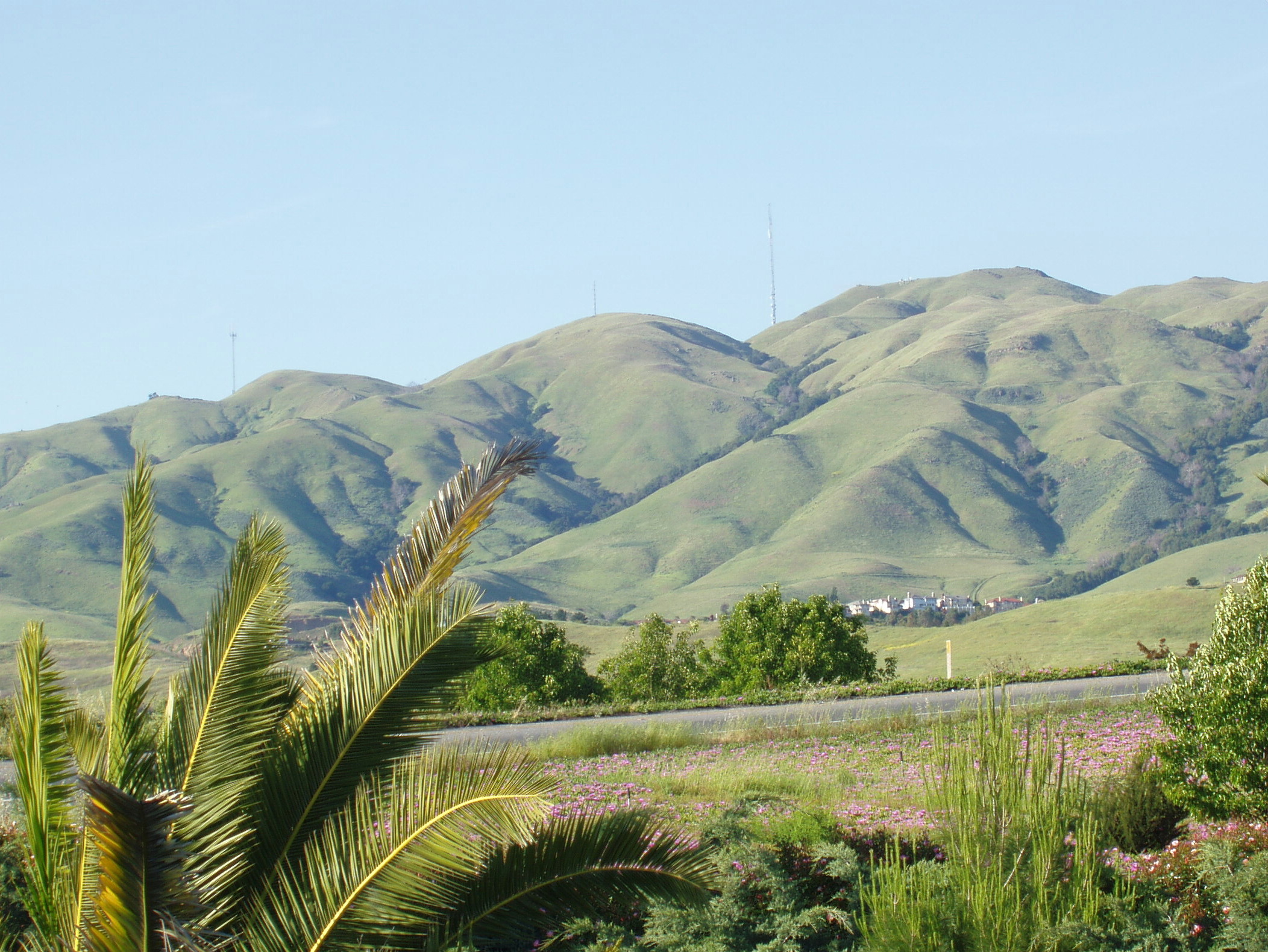
Monument Peak over Milpitas, California

=== Geography ===
The Southern Coast Ranges, of the California Coast Ranges in the Pacific Coast Ranges System, run north and south, parallel to the Pacific Coast in north-central through north-southern California. The Southern Coast Ranges begin on the San Francisco Peninsula and in the East San Francisco Bay Area, and run south into Santa Barbara County. The Transverse Ranges lie to the south. The San Joaquin Valley is on the east, and Pacific Ocean on the west.

The Southern Coast Ranges include the Berkeley Hills, the Diablo Range, the Santa Cruz Mountains, the Gabilan Range, the Santa Lucia Range and Sierra de Salinas, the Temblor Range, and the Sierra Madre.

There are Outer Southern Coast Ranges along the Pacific Ocean on the west, and Inner Southern Coast Ranges to the east, inland to the San Joaquin Valley. The central and southern San Francisco Bay and the Salinas Valley lie between them.

The highest point of the Southern Coast Ranges is Junipero Serra Peak in the Santa Lucia Range, at 5,862 feet (1,787 m). Other peaks include Mount Diablo at 3,849 feet (1,173 m), and Mount Hamilton at 4,196 feet (1,279 m).

=== Natural history ===
The Southern Coast Ranges have a predominantly Mediterranean climate, and are primarily within the California chaparral and woodlands ecoregion. However, the moister areas of the Santa Cruz Mountains lie within the Northern California coastal forests ecoregion, characterized by forests of Coast redwood. Isolated groves of Coast redwoods are also found in the Big Sur region of the Santa Lucia Range, making them the southernmost natural occurrences of the species.

Some of the rarest forest habitat that occurs in the California Coast Ranges are the Maritime Coast Range Ponderosa Pine forests of the western Santa Cruz Mountains. These isolated groves may include Ponderosa pine, Douglas fir, and knobcone pine.

Notably, the highest slopes of the Santa Lucias contain small patches of Sierran Conifer forest, including incense cedar, and ponderosa, Jeffrey, and sugar pines. Steep rocky slopes harbor the endemic Santa Lucia Fir, the rarest species of fir on earth.

The California chaparral and woodlands ecoregion has a great range of plant communities in the Southern Coast Ranges, including mixed evergreen forests, oak woodland and savannas, grasslands, northern coastal scrub, and the Monterey pine woodlands of the Monterey Peninsula and two other coastal enclaves of the Santa Lucia Range. The name "chaparral" comes from the Spanish word chaparro, applied to California scrub oaks and Coastal scrub oaks.

Common tree species of oak woodlands include oaks, California bay, and buckeye. Riparian species of the coast ranges include sycamore, white alder, willows, and bigleaf maple.

Columbian Black-tailed deer occupy the northern and more coastal portions of the Southern Coast Ranges, and California mule deer occupy inland and southernmost portions of the Southern Coast Ranges.

== Ranges ==
- Bald Hills
- Berkeley Hills
- Caliente Range
- Chalk Mountains
- Diablo Range
- Gabilan Range
- King Range
- La Panza Range
- Marin Hills
- Mayacamas Mountains
- Mendocino Range
- Santa Cruz Mountains
- Santa Lucia Range
- Shelton Buttes
- Sonoma Mountains
- Temblor Range
- Vaca Mountains
- Klamath Mountains
- Northern Coast Ranges
- Southern Coast Ranges
- Transverse Ranges
- Peninsular Ranges

== See also ==
- California Coast Ranges topics
- Coast Range Geomorphic Province
- Inner Coast Ranges
- Natural history of the California Coast Ranges
- Mountain ranges of California
- North American Cordillera
