= San Andreas Fault =

Geologic feature in California, United States

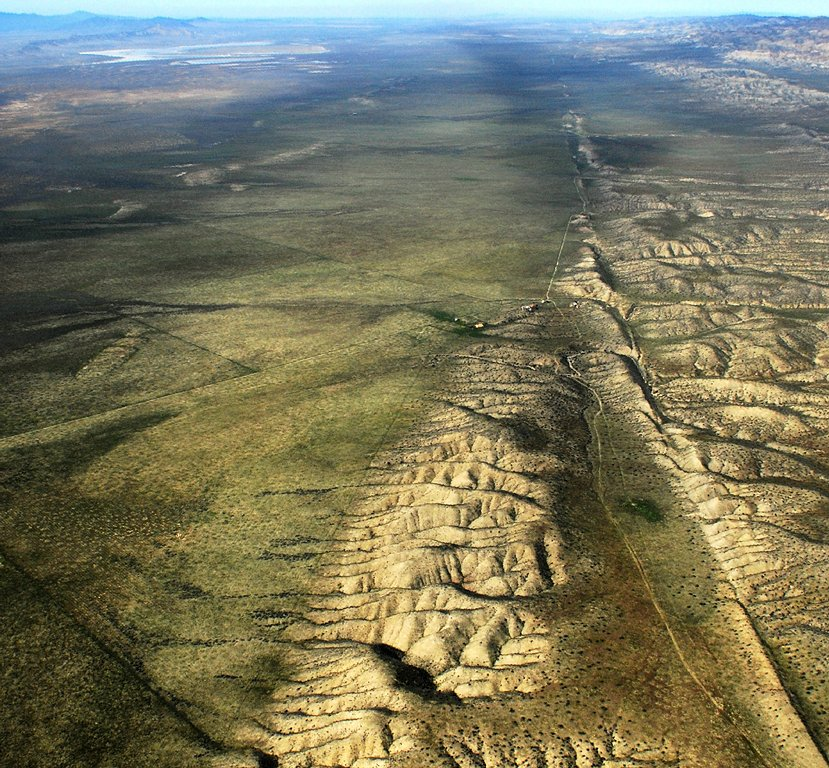
- The fault (right) and the Carrizo Plain (left)

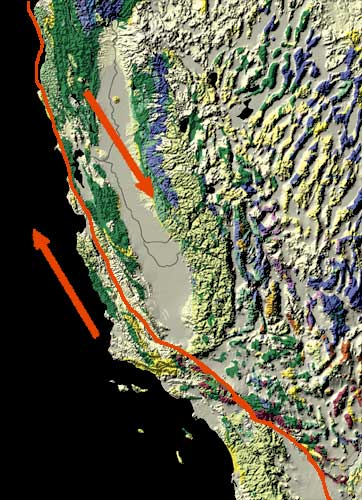
- Arrows show relative motion of the North American plate (southeastward) and the Pacific plate (northwestward)
- Named by: Andrew Lawson
- Year defined: 1895
- Coordinates: 35°06′N 119°39′W
- Country: United States, Mexico
- State: California, Baja California, Sonora
- Cities: San Francisco, San Bernardino, San Juan Bautista

Characteristics
- Segments: Calaveras, Hayward, Elsinore, Imperial, Laguna Salada, San Jacinto
- Length: 800 mi (1,300 km)
- Displacement: 0.79 to 1.38 in (20 to 35 mm)/yr

Tectonics
- Plate: North American & Pacific
- Status: Active
- Earthquakes: 1812 (M_{w} ≈7.5), 1838 (M_{w} ≈7.2), 1857 (M_{w} ≈7.9), 1906 (M_{w} ≈7.9), 1957 (M_{w} 5.7), 1989 (M_{w} ≈6.9), 2004 (M_{w} ≈6.0)
- Type: Transform fault
- Movement: Dextral
- Age: Neogene-Holocene
- Orogeny: Gorda-California-Nevada

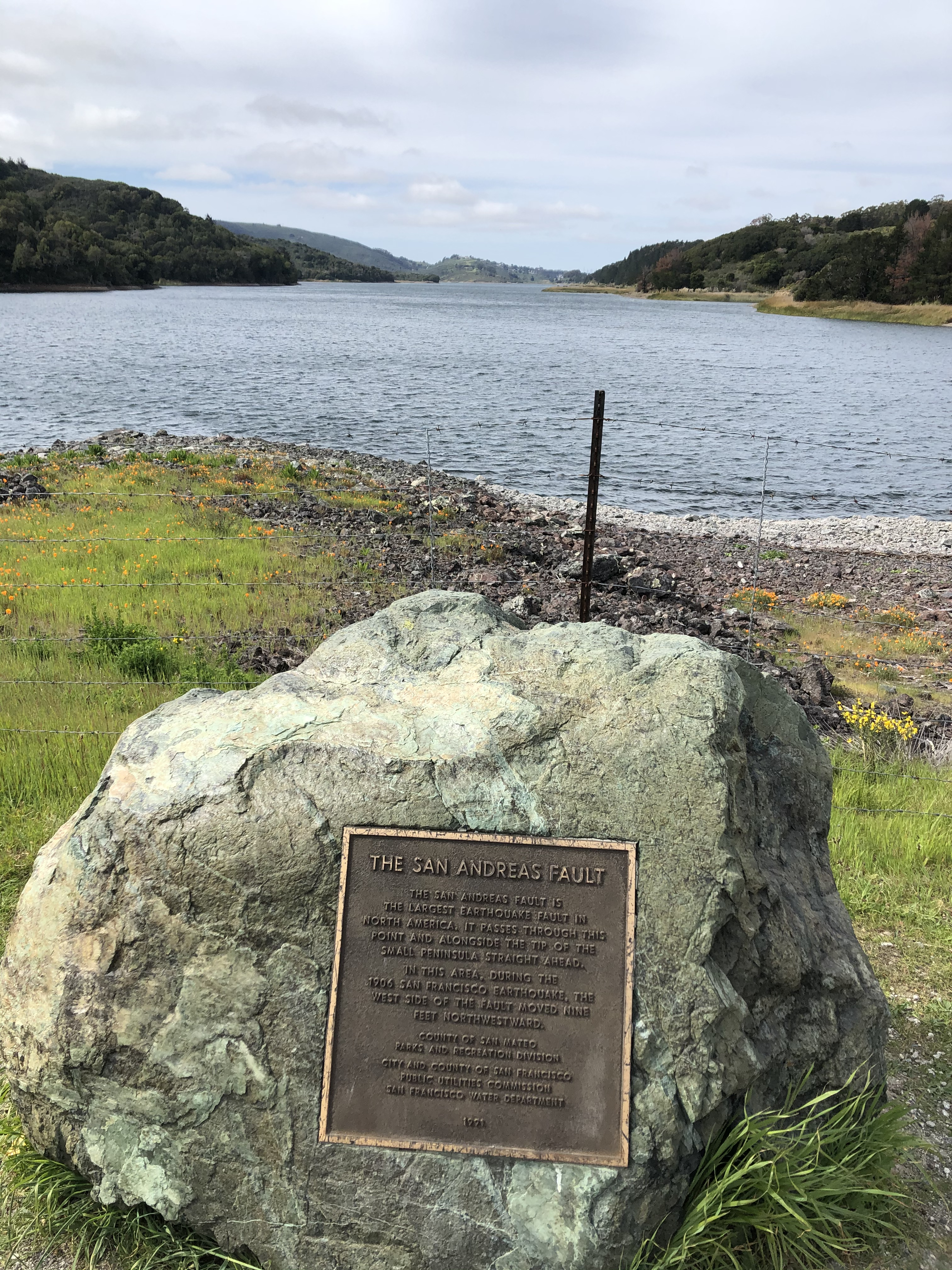
Plaque showing location of San Andreas Fault in San Mateo County

The San Andreas Fault is a continental right-lateral strike-slip transform fault that extends roughly 750 mi (1,210 km) through the U.S. state of California. It forms part of the tectonic boundary between the Pacific plate and the North American plate. Traditionally, for scientific purposes, the fault has been classified into three main segments (northern, central, and southern), each with different characteristics and a different degree of earthquake risk. The average slip rate along the entire fault ranges from 0.79 to 1.38 inches (20 to 35 mm) per year.

In the north, the fault terminates offshore near Eureka, California, at the Mendocino triple junction, where three tectonic plates meet. The Cascadia subduction zone intersects the San Andreas fault at the Mendocino triple junction. It has been hypothesized that a major earthquake along the Cascadia subduction zone could trigger a rupture along the San Andreas Fault.

In the south, the fault terminates near Bombay Beach, California, in the Salton Sea. Here, the plate motion transitions from right-lateral to divergent, characteristic of the East Pacific Rise further south. In this region, the Salton Trough, the plate boundary has been rifting and pulling apart, creating a new mid-ocean ridge that is an extension of the Gulf of California. Sediment deposited by the Colorado River is preventing the trough from being filled in with sea water from the gulf.

The fault was first identified in 1895 by Professor Andrew Lawson of UC Berkeley. In the wake of the 1906 San Francisco earthquake, Lawson was tasked with deciphering the origin of the earthquake. He began by surveying and mapping offsets (such as fences or roads that had been sliced in half) along surface ruptures. When the location of these offsets were plotted on a map, he noted that they made a near perfect line on top of the fault he previously discovered. He concluded that the fault must have been the origin of the earthquake.

This line ran through San Andreas Lake, a sag pond. The lake was created from an extensional step over in the fault, which created a natural depression where water could settle. A common misconception is that Lawson named the fault after this lake. However, according to some of his reports from 1895 and 1908, he actually named it after the surrounding San Andreas Valley. Following the 1906 San Francisco earthquake, Lawson also concluded that the fault extended all the way into Southern California. In 1953, geologist Thomas Dibblee concluded that hundreds of miles of lateral movement had occurred along the fault.

A National Science Foundation funded project called the San Andreas Fault Observatory at Depth (SAFOD) near Parkfield, California, involved drilling through the fault from 2004 to 2007. The aim was to collect core samples and make direct geophysical and geochemical observations to better understand fault behavior at depth.

== Fault zones ==
=== Southern ===
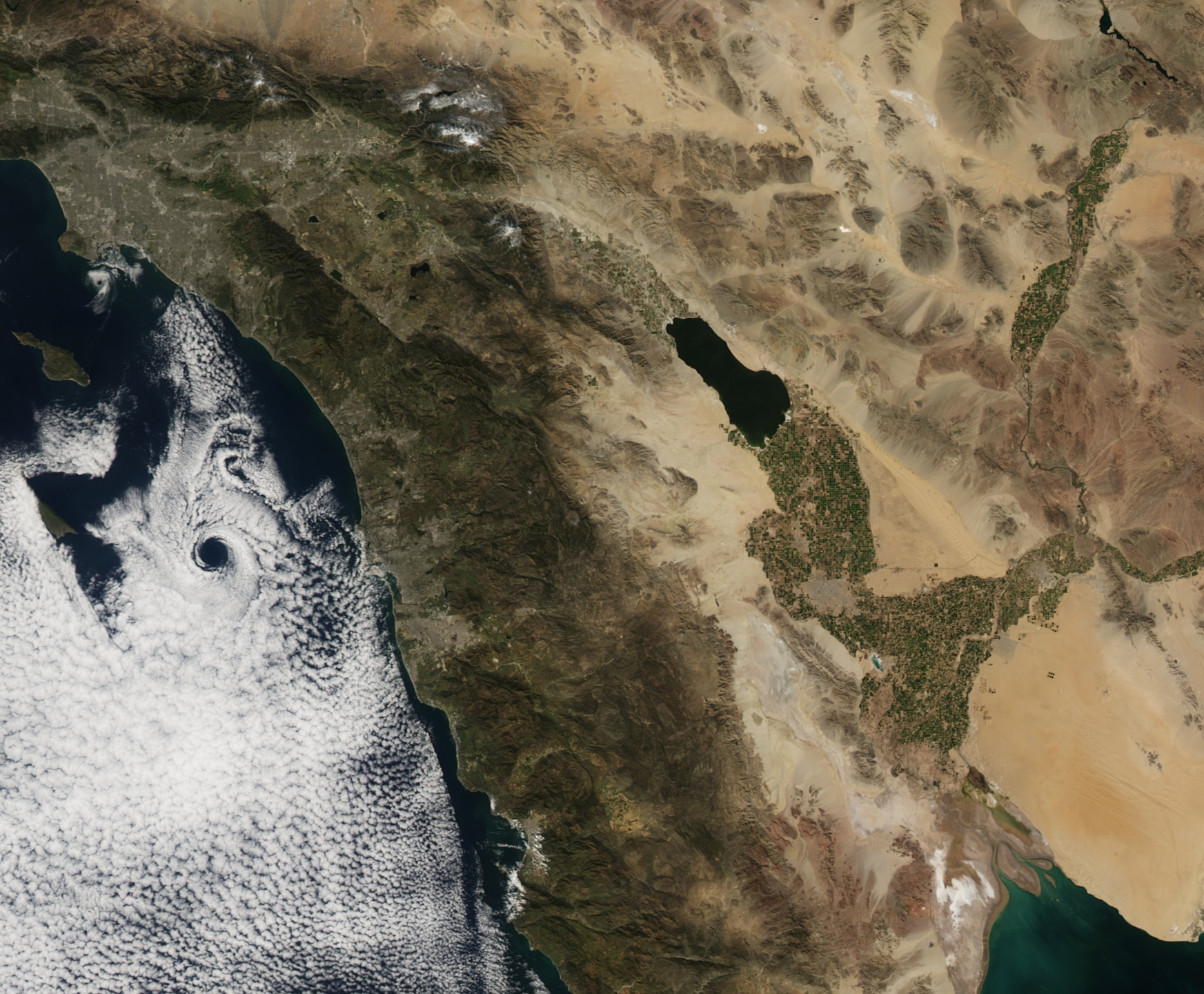
Southern San Andreas Fault. The red lines are simplified faults. Right-lateral direction of motion of the transform fault is shown (pink arrows). The red rhombs are pull-apart basins; the northern one is the site of the Niland geothermal field, the southern the Cerro Prieto geothermal field.

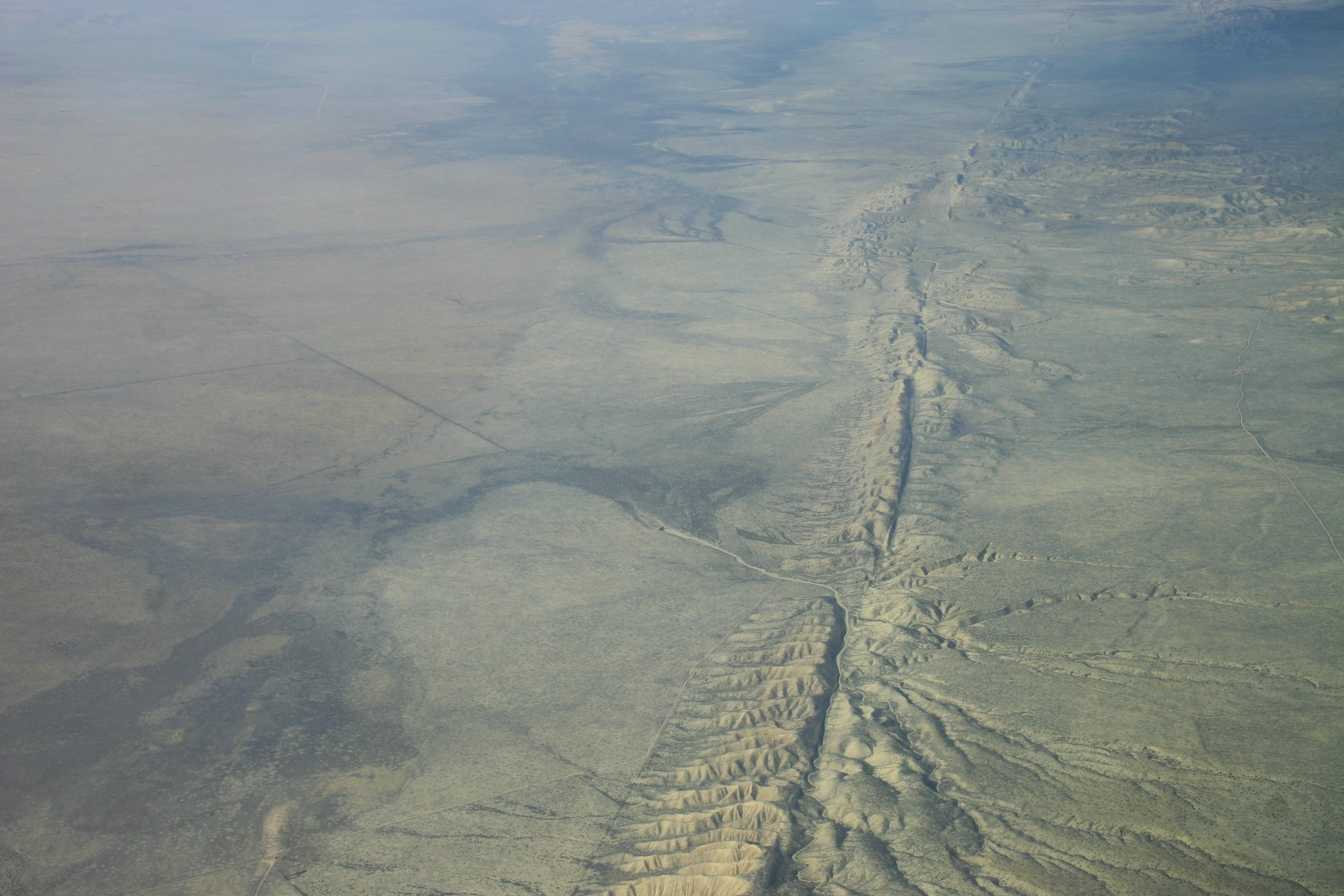
Aerial photo of the San Andreas Fault in the Carrizo Plain

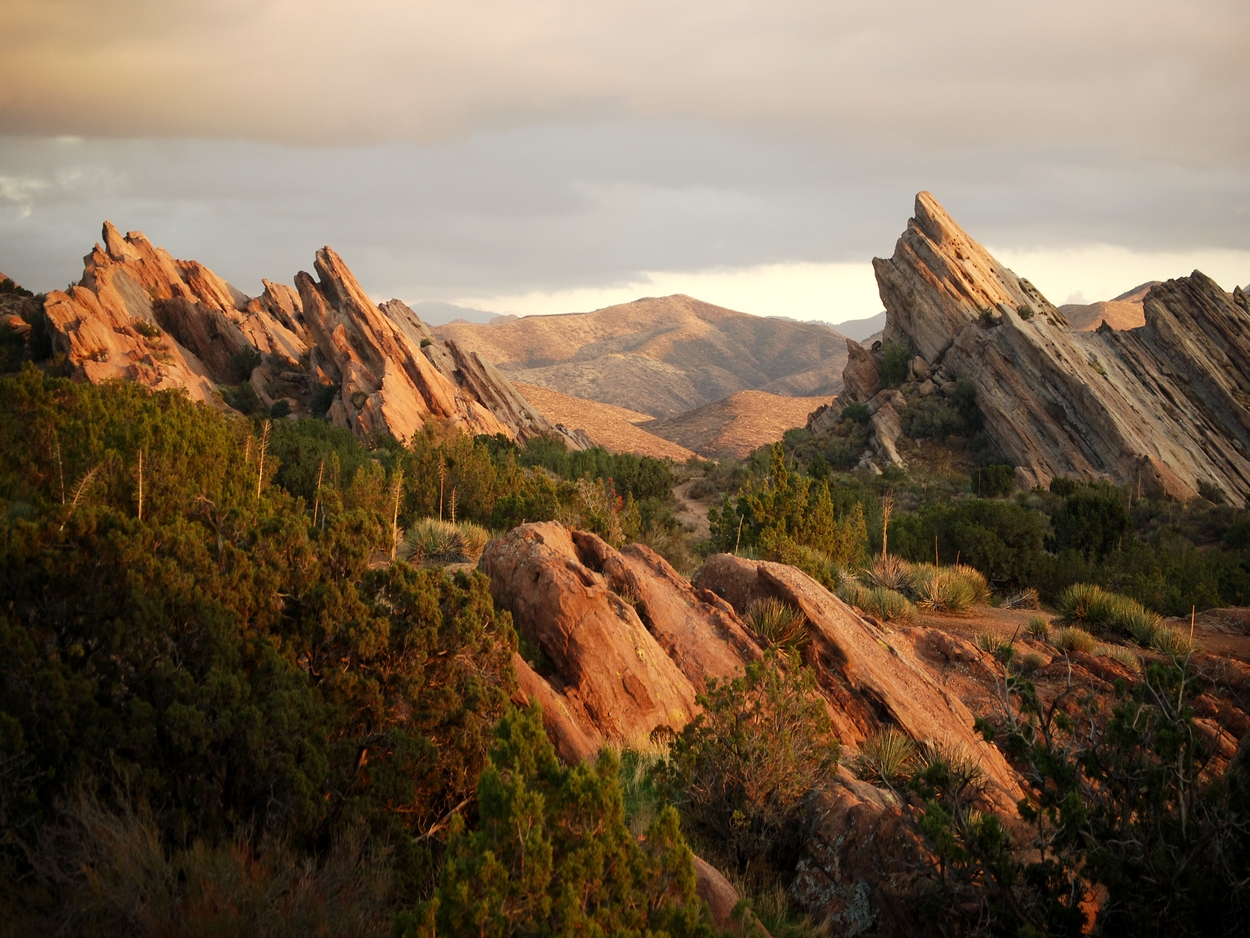
The Vasquez Rocks in Agua Dulce, California are evidence of the San Andreas Fault and part of the 2,650-mile Pacific Crest Trail.

The southern segment (also known as the Mojave segment) begins near Bombay Beach, California. Box Canyon, near the Salton Sea, contains upturned strata associated with that section of the fault. The fault then runs along the southern base of the San Bernardino Mountains, crosses through Cajon Pass and continues northwest along the northern base of the San Gabriel Mountains. These mountains are a result of movement along the San Andreas Fault and are commonly called the Transverse Range. In Palmdale, a portion of the fault is easily examined at a roadcut for the Antelope Valley Freeway. The fault continues northwest alongside the Elizabeth Lake Road to the town of Elizabeth Lake. As it passes the towns of Gorman, Tejon Pass and Frazier Park, the fault begins to bend northward, forming the "Big Bend". This restraining bend is thought to be where the fault locks up in Southern California, with an earthquake-recurrence interval of roughly 140–160 years. Northwest of Frazier Park, the fault runs through the Carrizo Plain, a long, treeless plain where much of the fault is plainly visible. The Elkhorn Scarp defines the fault trace along much of its length within the plain.

The southern segment, which stretches from Parkfield in Monterey County all the way to the Salton Sea, is capable of an 8.1-magnitude earthquake. At its closest, this fault passes about 35 miles (56 km) to the northeast of Los Angeles. Such a large earthquake on this southern segment would kill thousands of people in Los Angeles, San Bernardino, Riverside, and surrounding areas, and cause hundreds of billions of dollars in damage.

=== Central ===
The central segment of the San Andreas Fault runs in a northwestern direction from Parkfield to Hollister. While the southern section of the fault and the parts through Parkfield experience earthquakes, the rest of the central section of the fault exhibits a phenomenon called aseismic creep, where the fault slips continuously without causing earthquakes. It was formed by a transform boundary.

=== Northern ===
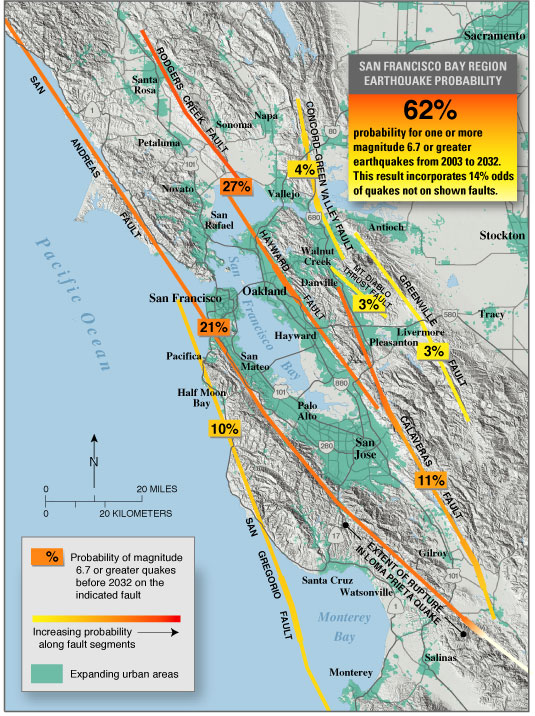
A map displaying each of the seven major faults in the San Francisco Bay Area, and the probability of an M6.7 earthquake or higher occurring on each fault between 2003 and 2032

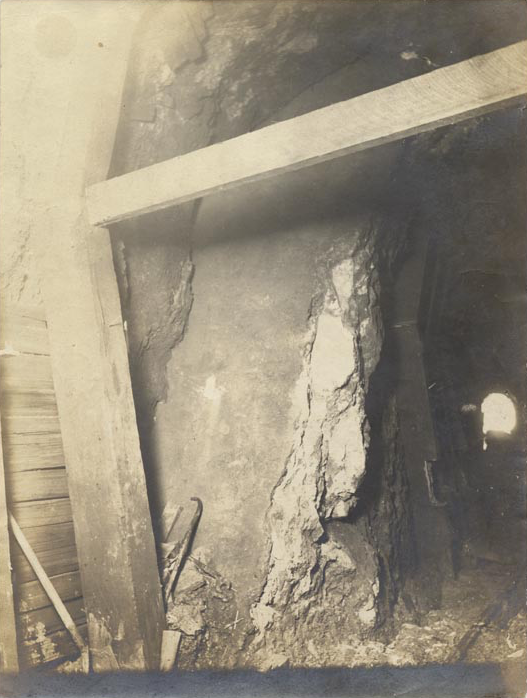
The slip on the San Andreas Fault that caused the 1906 San Francisco earthquake was visible in Wrights Tunnel along the South Pacific Coast Railroad after the earthquake

The northern segment of the fault runs from Hollister, through the Santa Cruz Mountains, epicenter of the 1989 Loma Prieta earthquake, then up the San Francisco Peninsula, where it was first identified by Professor Lawson in 1895, then offshore at Daly City near Mussel Rock. This is the approximate location of the epicenter of the 1906 San Francisco earthquake. The fault returns onshore at Bolinas Lagoon just north of Stinson Beach in Marin County. It returns underwater through the linear trough of Tomales Bay that separates the Point Reyes Peninsula from the mainland, runs just east of Bodega Head through Bodega Bay and back underwater, and returns onshore at Fort Ross. (In this region around the San Francisco Bay Area several significant "sister faults" run more-or-less parallel, and each of these can create significantly destructive earthquakes.) From Fort Ross, the northern segment continues overland, forming in part a linear valley through which the Gualala River flows. It goes back offshore at Point Arena. After that, it runs underwater along the coast until it nears Cape Mendocino, where it begins to bend to the west, terminating at the Mendocino triple junction.

== Plate boundaries ==
The Pacific plate, to the west of the fault, is moving in a northwest direction while the North American plate to the east is moving toward the southwest, but relatively southeast under the influence of plate tectonics. The rate of slippage averages about 33 to 37 millimeters (1.3 to 1.5 in) a year across California.

The southwestward motion of the North American plate towards the Pacific is creating compressional forces along the eastern side of the fault. The effect is expressed as the Coast Ranges. The northwest movement of the Pacific plate is also creating significant compressional forces that are especially pronounced where the North American plate has forced the San Andreas to jog westward. This has led to the formation of the Transverse Ranges in Southern California, and to a lesser but still significant extent, the Santa Cruz Mountains (the location of the Loma Prieta earthquake in 1989).

Studies of the relative motions of the Pacific and North American plates have shown that only about 75 percent of the motion can be accounted for in the movements of the San Andreas and its various branch faults. The rest of the motion has been found in an area east of the Sierra Nevada mountains called the Walker Lane or Eastern California Shear Zone. The reason for this is not clear. Several hypotheses have been offered and research is ongoing. One hypothesis – which gained interest following the Landers earthquake in 1992 – suggests the plate boundary may be shifting eastward away from the San Andreas towards Walker Lane.

Assuming the plate boundary does not change as hypothesized, projected motion indicates that the landmass west of the San Andreas Fault, including Los Angeles, will eventually slide past San Francisco, then continue northwestward toward the Aleutian Trench, over a period of perhaps twenty million years.

== Formation ==
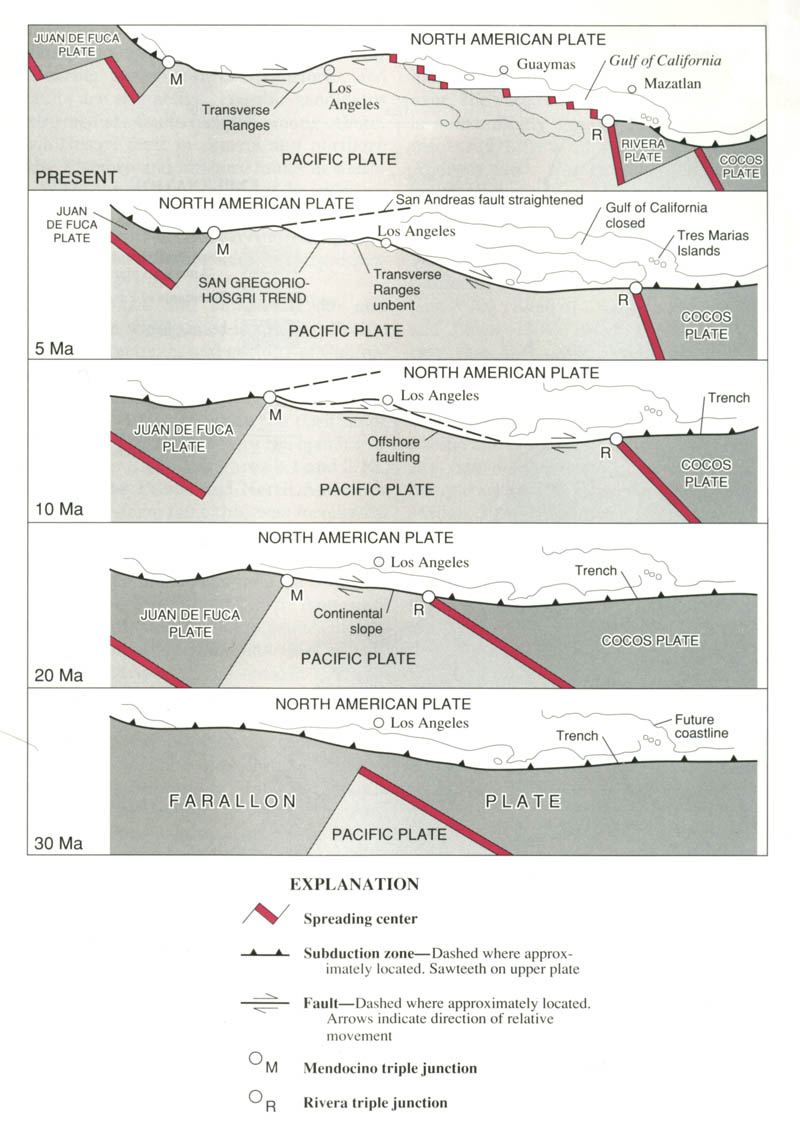
Tectonic evolution of the San Andreas Fault

The San Andreas began to form in the mid-Cenozoic about 30 Mya (million years ago). At this time, a spreading center between the Pacific plate and the Farallon plate (which is now mostly subducted, with remnants including the Juan de Fuca plate, Rivera plate, Cocos plate, and the Nazca plate) was beginning to reach the subduction zone off the western coast of North America. As the relative motion between the Pacific and North American plates was different from the relative motion between the Farallon and North American plates, the spreading ridge began to be "subducted", creating a new relative motion and a new style of deformation along the plate boundaries. These geological features are what are chiefly seen along San Andreas Fault. It also includes a possible driver for the deformation of the Basin and Range, separation of the Baja California peninsula, and rotation of the Transverse Ranges.

The main southern section of the San Andreas Fault proper has only existed for about 5 million years. The first known incarnation of the southern part of the fault was Clemens Well-Fenner-San Francisquito fault zone around 22–13 Ma. This system added the San Gabriel Fault as a primary focus of movement between 10–5 Ma. Currently, it is believed that the modern San Andreas will eventually transfer its motion toward a fault within the eastern California shear zone. This complicated evolution, especially along the southern segment, is mostly caused by either the "Big Bend" and/or a difference in the motion vector between the plates and the trend of the fault and its surrounding branches.

== Study ==
=== Early years ===
The fault was first identified in Northern California by UC Berkeley geology professor Andrew Lawson in 1895 and named by him after the surrounding San Andreas valley. Eleven years later, Lawson discovered that the San Andreas Fault stretched southward into southern California after reviewing the effects of the 1906 San Francisco earthquake. Large-scale (hundreds of miles) lateral movement along the fault was first proposed in a 1953 paper by geologists Mason Hill and Thomas Dibblee. This idea, which was considered radical at the time, has since been vindicated by modern plate tectonics.

=== Current research ===
Seismologists discovered that the San Andreas Fault near Parkfield in central California consistently produces a magnitude 6.0 earthquake approximately once every 22 years. Following recorded seismic events in 1857, 1881, 1901, 1922, 1934, and 1966, scientists predicted that another earthquake should occur in Parkfield in 1993. It eventually occurred in 2004. Due to the frequency of predictable activity, Parkfield has become one of the most important areas in the world for large earthquake research.

In 2004, work began just north of Parkfield on the San Andreas Fault Observatory at Depth (SAFOD). The goal of SAFOD is to drill a hole nearly 3 kilometres (1.9 mi) into the Earth's crust and into the San Andreas Fault. An array of sensors will be installed to record earthquakes that happen near this area.

A 2023 study found a link between the water level in Lake Cahuilla (now the Salton Sea) and seismic activity along the southern San Andreas Fault. The study suggests that major earthquakes along this section of the fault coincided with high water levels in the lake. The hydrological load caused by high water levels can more than double the stress on the southern San Andreas Fault, which is likely sufficient for triggering earthquakes. This may explain the abnormally long period of time since the last major earthquake in the region since the lake has dried up.

The San Andreas Fault System has been the subject of a flood of studies. In particular, scientific research performed during the last 23 years has given rise to about 3,400 publications.

=== The next "Big One" ===
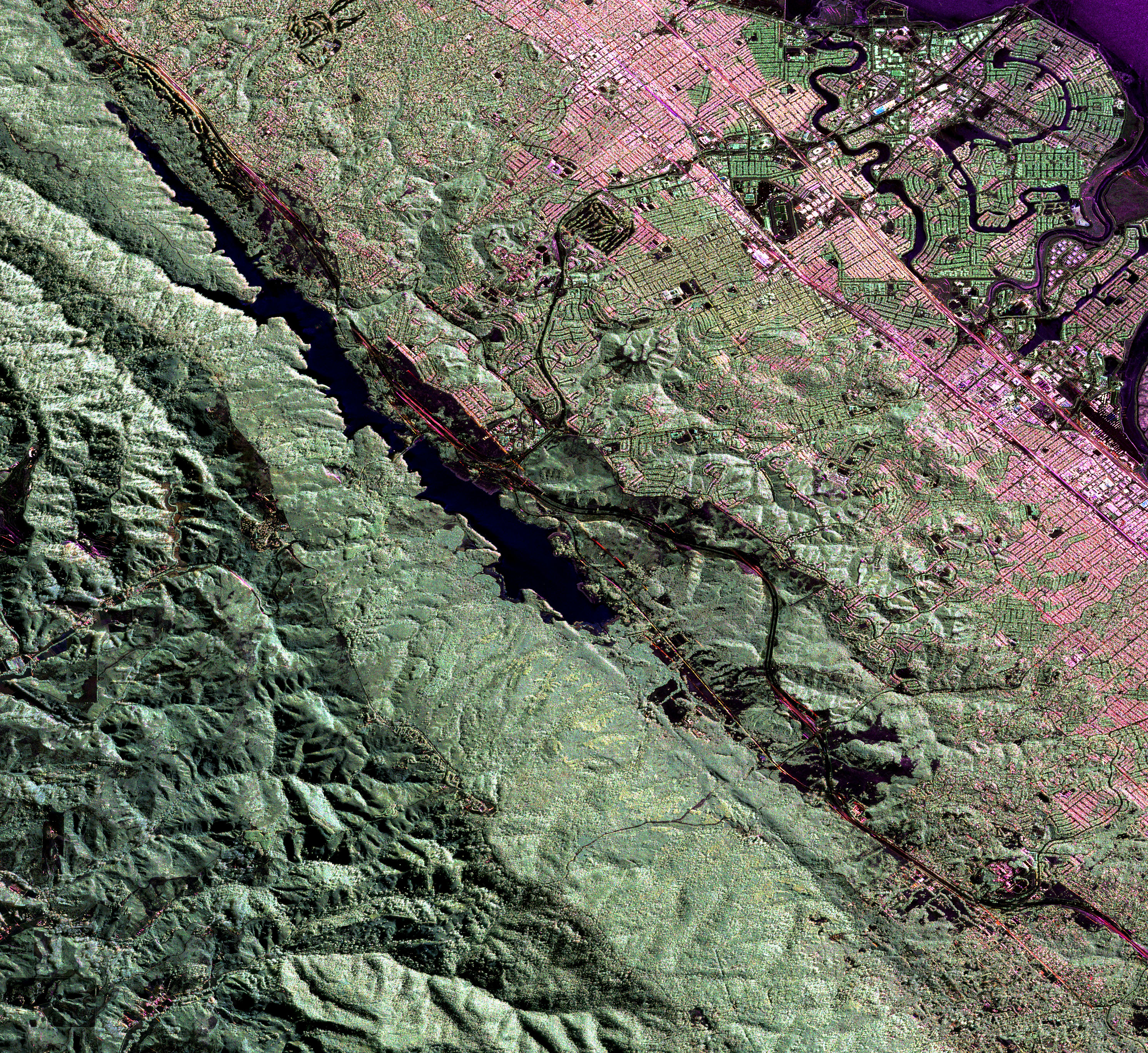
Radar generated 3-D view of the San Andreas Fault, at Crystal Springs Reservoir near San Mateo, California

A study published in 2006 in the journal Nature by Yuri Fialko, an associate professor at the Cecil H. and Ida M. Green Institute of Geophysics and Planetary Physics at Scripps Institution of Oceanography, found that the San Andreas fault has reached a sufficient stress level for an earthquake of magnitude greater than 7.0 on the moment magnitude scale to occur. This study also found that the risk of a large earthquake may be increasing more rapidly than scientists had previously believed. Moreover, the risk is currently concentrated on the southern section of the fault, i.e. the region around Los Angeles, because strong earthquakes have occurred relatively recently on the central (1857) and northern (1906) segments of the fault, while the southern section has not seen any similar rupture for at least 300 years. According to this study, a major earthquake on that southern section of the San Andreas fault would result in major damage to the Palm Springs–Indio metropolitan area and other cities in San Bernardino, Riverside and Imperial counties in California, and Mexicali Municipality in Baja California. It would be strongly felt (and potentially cause significant damage) throughout much of Southern California, including densely populated areas of Los Angeles County, Ventura County, Orange County, San Diego County, Ensenada Municipality and Tijuana Municipality, Baja California, San Luis Rio Colorado in Sonora and Yuma, Arizona. Older buildings would be especially prone to damage or collapse, as would buildings built on unconsolidated gravel or in coastal areas where water tables are high (and thus subject to soil liquefaction). Of the study, Fialko stated:

All these data suggest that the fault is ready for the next big earthquake but exactly when the triggering will happen and when the earthquake will occur we cannot tell. It could be tomorrow or it could be 10 years or more from now.

Nevertheless, in the 20 years since that publication there has not been a substantial quake in the Los Angeles area, and two major reports issued by the United States Geological Survey (USGS) have made variable predictions as to the risk of future seismic events. The ability to predict major earthquakes with sufficient precision to warrant increased precautions has remained elusive.

The U.S. Geological Survey's most recent forecast, known as UCERF3 (Uniform California Earthquake Rupture Forecast 3), released in November 2013, estimated that an earthquake of magnitude 6.7 M or greater (i.e. equal to or greater than the 1994 Northridge earthquake) occurs about once every 6.3 years statewide. The same report also estimated there is a 7% probability that an earthquake of magnitude 8.0 or greater will occur in the next 30 years somewhere along the San Andreas Fault. A different USGS study in 2008 tried to assess the physical, social and economic consequences of a major earthquake in Southern California. That study predicted that a magnitude 7.8 earthquake along the southern San Andreas Fault could cause about 1,800 deaths and $213 billion in damage.

==== The HayWired Scenario ====
This scenario hypothesizes the potential effects of a 7.0 magnitude earthquake on the Hayward Fault in the San Francisco Bay Area. It aims to estimate the impacts on urban infrastructures along with the rebuilding efforts to both the landscape and economy. This study combines not only the geological impacts/effects of the event, but also the societal impacts such as property damage, economic rebuilding, and aims at estimating damages if cities increased risk-reduction. It was developed for preparedness geared towards Bay Area residents and as a warning with an attempt to encourage local policy makers to create infrastructure and protections that would further risk reduction and resilience-building. This study is a combined effort from experts in the physical sciences, social sciences, and engineering both in the public and private sectors, ranging from urban planners to economists/business professionals. Not only does this study aim to estimate the impacts of the event, but also the years of rebuilding and funding needed to recover communities from a potential disaster such as the HayWired Scenario.

The first volume of the HayWired Scenario study was released in 2017, with consistent continuations and contributions by engineers. This continuation was published in the second volume, Engineering Implications, in 2018.

===== Estimating damages =====
As of the 2021 Fact sheet update, there are several estimates on damages ranging from the approximate people affected at home, work, effects of lifeline infrastructures such as telecommunications, and more. This group of scientists have worked together to create estimates of how hazards such as liquefaction, landslides, and fire ignition will impact access to utilities, transportation, and general emergency services.

This study goes into detail about the specific populations to be hardest impacted by a potential earthquake of a 7.0 magnitude, specifically in the San Francisco Bay Area. This includes intensified hardships for those with low-income, racially and culturally-diverse populations, and people with literacy hardships that would significantly "increase their risk of displacement and add to recovery challenges" (Wein et al.).

===== Scientific and economic involvement =====
In addition to societal and landscape impacts, this study looks at potential business interruptions. This portion estimates impacts to the California economy within the first 6 months post-recovery from the event through estimates of "utility outages, property damages, and supply chain disruptions resulting in an estimated $44 billion of gross state product (GSP) losses, or translated at 4% of the California economy"(Wein et al.). This study also projects the recovery of jobs lost in highly impacted areas, such as Alameda County, could take up to 10 years to fully recover job losses and possible economic recession. Trajectories for economic recovery are improved by reconstruction but also delayed with impacts to the construction industry.

=== Cascadia connection ===
A 2008 paper, studying past earthquakes along the Pacific coastal zone, found a correlation in time between seismic events on the northern San Andreas Fault and the southern part of the Cascadia subduction zone (which stretches from Vancouver Island to Northern California). Scientists believe quakes on the Cascadia subduction zone may have triggered most of the major quakes on the northern San Andreas within the past 3,000 years. The evidence also shows the rupture direction going from north to south in each of these time-correlated events. However the 1906 San Francisco earthquake seems to have been the exception to this correlation because the plate movement was mostly from south to north and it was not preceded by a major quake in the Cascadia zone.

== Earthquakes ==
The San Andreas Fault has had some notable earthquakes in historic times:

- 1812 San Juan Capistrano earthquake: At least 25 kilometers (16 mi) were ruptured in Southern California. Several of the Roman Catholic missions in the area experienced heavy damage. Early studies indicated the earthquake was on the Newport-Inglewood fault due to the proximity of the damage, but a later study in 2002 indicated the San Andreas fault was the cause. More recent studies suggest a joint rupture that included both the San Andreas Fault, and San Jacinto Fault are more accepted scenarios. Around 40 people died, and the magnitude ranged from 6.9 to 7.5.
- 1857 Fort Tejon earthquake: About 350 kilometers (220 mi) were ruptured in central and southern California. Though it is known as the Fort Tejon earthquake, the epicenter is thought to have been located far to the north, just south of Parkfield. Two deaths were reported. Its moment magnitude was 7.9.
- 1906 San Francisco earthquake: About 430 kilometers (270 mi) were ruptured in Northern California. The epicenter was near San Francisco. At least 3,000 people died in the earthquake and subsequent fires. The magnitude was estimated to be 7.8.
- 1957 San Francisco earthquake: A magnitude 5.7 quake with an epicenter on the San Andreas fault in the ocean west of San Francisco and Daly City.
- 1989 Loma Prieta earthquake: About 40 kilometers (25 mi) were ruptured (although the rupture did not reach the surface) near Santa Cruz, California, causing 63 deaths and moderate damage in certain vulnerable locations in the San Francisco Bay Area. Moment magnitude was about 6.9. This quake occurred on October 17, 1989, at approximately 5:04 pm PDT.
- 2004 Parkfield earthquake: On September 28, 2004, at 10:15 a.m. PDT, a magnitude 6.0 earthquake struck the Parkfield area. It was felt across the state, including the San Francisco Bay Area.

== See also ==
- California earthquake forecast – 2015 US Geological Survey earthquake forecast for California
- Central Valley (California) – Flat valley that dominates central California
- Coast Range Geomorphic Province
- Garlock Fault – Seismic fault in California, United States
- Geologic timeline of Western North America
- North Anatolian Fault – Turkish seismic strike-slip fault
- Earthquake – 1974 American disaster film by Mark Robson
- San Andreas – 2015 film by Brad Peyton
- Cascadia subduction zone – Tectonic boundary in North America
