= Chalk Mountains (California) =

Mountain range in California, United States

- Location within California

Highest point
- Elevation: 761 m (2,497 ft)

Geography
- Country: United States
- State: California
- District: Humboldt County
- Range coordinates: 40°26′42.501″N 123°52′14.149″W
- Topo map: USGS Bridgeville

The Chalk Mountains are a mountain range in Humboldt County, California.
