= Coast Range Geomorphic Province =

Coordinates: 39°N 123°W

The Coast Range Geomorphic Province is a portion of coastal California, United States. This orogen geomorphic province constitutes a barrier between the Pacific Ocean and the San Joaquin Valley which trends northwest from Point Conception to the border with Oregon, with a significant break in the San Francisco Bay Area by the basins of the Sacramento River and San Joaquin River that discharge into the Pacific. The province consists of mountain ranges and the corresponding valleys and basins.

The San Francisco Bay Area naturally subdivides the province into the North Coast Ranges and South Coast Ranges.

The province is formed as an interaction between the North American and Pacific tectonic plates. The Pacific Plate moves northwest relatively to the North American one with speed of about 35–38 mm/year, with the majority of motion occurring during large earthquakes, with some aseismic fault creep. The overlap of the plates is about 100 km wide and contains all major geologic faults of the Northern California. The mountain ranges of the province are composed primarily of late Mesozoic (200 to 70 million years old) Cenozoic (less than 70 million years old) sedimentary strata.
