= Shelton Buttes =

Mountains in California, United States

- Location within California Location within the United States

Highest point
- Elevation: 808 m (2,651 ft)

Geography
- Country: United States
- State: California
- District: Humboldt County
- Range coordinates: 41°12′34.450″N 123°51′46.235″W
- Topo map: USGS French Camp Ridge

The Shelton Buttes are a mountain group of Buttes in Humboldt County, California.
