= Newtown =

Newtown may refer to:

== Places ==
=== Australia ===
- Newtown, New South Wales
- Newtown, Queensland (Ipswich)
- Newtown, Queensland (Toowoomba)
- Newtown, Victoria, a suburb of Geelong
- Newtown, Victoria (Golden Plains Shire), a locality near Ballarat

=== Canada ===
- Newtown, Newfoundland and Labrador

=== India ===
- New Town, Kolkata

=== Ireland ===
==== County Tipperary ====
- Newtown, Ballymurreen, County Tipperary, a townland in North Tipperary
- Newtown, County Tipperary, a settlement in the barony of Owney and Arra
- Newtown, Ormond Lower County Tipperary, a townland in the barony of Ormond Lower
- Newtown (Guest), County Tipperary, a townland in the barony of Ormond Lower
- Newtown (Hodgins), County Tipperary, a townland in the barony of Ormond Lower
- Newtown, Iffa and Offa East, a townland in County Tipperary
- Newtown, Ikerrin, two townlands in County Tipperary
- Newtown, Kilnamanagh Lower, a townland in County Tipperary
- Newtown, Kilnamanagh Upper, two townlands in County Tipperary
- Newtown, Ormond Upper, a townland in County Tipperary
- Newtown, Owney and Arra, two townlands in County Tipperary

==== Elsewhere in Ireland ====
- Newtown (Kinawley), a townland in Kinawley civil parish, County Cavan
- Newtown, Templeport, a townland in Templeport civil parish, County Cavan
- Newtown, County Cork, a census town
- Newtown, County Dublin, a townland in South Dublin
- Newtown, County Laois, a village
- Newtown, County Leitrim, a village
- Newtown, County Meath, a civil parish of Ireland
- Newtown, Kilcumreragh, a townland in Kilcumreragh civil parish, barony of Kilcoursey, County Offaly
- Newtown, Ballymore, a townland in the civil parish of Ballymore, barony of Rathconrath, County Westmeath
- Newtown, County Westmeath, several townlands in County Westmeath
- Newtown, County Westmeath (civil parish), a civil parish in the barony of Moycashel
- Newtown, Delvin, a townland in the civil parish of Delvin, County Westmeath
- Newtownmountkennedy, County Wexford, a town called 'Newtown' for short

=== Isle of Man ===
- Newtown, Isle of Man

=== New Zealand ===
- Newtown, New Zealand, a suburb of Wellington
- Newtown (New Zealand electorate), a former parliamentary electorate, 1902–1908

=== South Africa ===
- Newtown, Johannesburg

=== United Kingdom ===
England

- Newtown, Birmingham
- Newtown, Bristol
- Newtown, Chester
- Newtown, Cornwall
- Newtown, Holme St Cuthbert, Cumbria
- Newtown, Irthington, Cumbria
- Newtown, Derbyshire
- Newtown, Dorset, a district of Poole
- Newtown, Exeter
- Newtown, Hampshire
- Newtown, Herefordshire, a village near Ivington
- Newtown, Isle of Wight
  - Newtown (constituency), a former constituency
- Newtown, Kent, an area of Ashford, alternatively New Town as shown on OS mapping.
- Newtown, Pendlebury, Greater Manchester, the location of Bridgewater Mill and Newtown Mill; see List of mills in Salford
- Newtown, Reading
- Newtown, Shropshire, a village in Shropshire
- Newtown, Buckland St Mary, Somerset, a UK location
- Newtown, Bridgwater, Somerset, a UK location
- Newtown, Chew Magna, Somerset
- Newtown, Staffordshire
- Newtown, Stockton-on-Tees
- Newtown, West Tisbury, Wiltshire
- Newtown, Droitwich Spa, Worcestershire, a UK location
- Newtown, Martley, Worcestershire, a UK location
- Newtown-in-St Martin, Cornwall
- Newtown Linford, Leicestershire
- Newtown Unthank, Leicestershire

Northern Ireland

- Newtown, County Down, a townland in Kilbroney, County Down
- Newtown, County Antrim, a townland in Ardclinis
- Newtown, County Armagh, a townland in County Armagh
- Newtown, County Fermanagh, a townland in County Fermanagh
- Newtown Upper, a townland in Kilbroney, County Down

Scotland

- Newtown St Boswells, in the Scottish Borders

Wales

- Newtown, Cardiff
- Newtown, Powys

=== United States ===
- Newtown, California
  - Newtown, El Dorado County, California
  - Newtown, Mariposa County, California
  - Newtown, Nevada County, California
  - Newtown, Shasta County, California, a place in Shasta County, California
- Newtown, Connecticut, incorporated Town in Fairfield County
  - Site of the Sandy Hook Elementary School shooting in 2012, the fourth deadliest mass shooting in American history.
- Newtown (borough), Connecticut, incorporated Borough in Fairfield County
- Newtown (Palatka), a neighborhood of Palatka, Florida
- Newtown (Sarasota, Florida)
- Newtown, Illinois, in Vermilion County
- Newtown Township, Livingston County, Illinois
- Newtown, Indiana
- Newtowne, an old name for Cambridge, Massachusetts, and its vicinity
- Newtown, an old name for Newton, Massachusetts
- Newtown, Missouri
- Newtown, New Jersey
- Newtown, an old name for the neighborhood of Elmhurst, Queens, New York
- Newtown, Ohio
- Newtown, Pennsylvania
  - Newtown, Bucks County, Pennsylvania
  - Newtown, Schuylkill County, Pennsylvania
  - Newtown Township, Bucks County, Pennsylvania
  - Newtown Township, Delaware County, Pennsylvania
- Newtown, South Carolina
- Newtown, Virginia
  - Newtown, Albemarle County, Virginia
  - Newtown, Greene County, Virginia
  - Newtown, King and Queen County, Virginia
  - Newtown, Lancaster County, Virginia
  - Newtown, Virginia Beach, Virginia, in Princess Anne County, Virginia
  - Stephens City, Virginia, which was formerly known as Newtown

== Sports ==
- Newtown A.F.C., Wales
- Newtown Jets, a founding team in the New South Wales Rugby League, Australia
- Newtown United FC, Saint Kitts and Nevis

== Other uses ==
- "Newtown", a song by the Slits from their 1979 album Cut
- Newtown (EP), a 2014 EP by Japanese band Folks
- Battle of Newtown, American Revolutionary War
- Jack Newtown, a nickname of F1 World Champion Jacques Villeneuve
- Newtown, a fictional town in the show Benjamin The Elephant

== See also ==
- New Town (disambiguation)
- Newton (disambiguation)
- Newtonville (disambiguation)
- Newtown station (disambiguation)
- Novgorod (disambiguation)
