= List of places in California (N) =

List of places in California - N

This list of current:

- cities
- towns, unincorporated communities
- counties, and other recognized places in the U.S. state of California.

Information on the number and names of counties in which the place lies, and its lower and upper ZIP Code bounds, if applicable are also included.

Name of place	Number of counties	Principal county	Lower zip code	Upper zip code
Nacimiento	1	Monterey County		
Nadeau	1	Los Angeles County	90001	
Nairobi	1	San Mateo County		
Nanceville	1	Tulare County	93257	
Nanning Creek	1	Humboldt County		
Napa	1	Napa County	94558	81
Napa Junction	1	Napa County	94503	
Napa Soda Springs	1	Napa County		
Napa State Hospital	1	Napa County		
Naples	1	Los Angeles County	90803	
Naples	1	Santa Barbara County		
Naranjo	1	Tulare County		
Narlon	1	Santa Barbara County		
Narod	1	San Bernardino County	91762	
Nashmead	1	Mendocino County		
Nashua	1	Monterey County		
Nashville	1	El Dorado County	95623	
National City	1	San Diego County	91950	51
National Military Home	1	Los Angeles County		
Natividad	1	Monterey County		
Natoma	1	Sacramento County		
Naud Junction	1	Los Angeles County		
Navajo	1	San Diego County	92119	
Naval	1	San Diego County	92136	
Naval	1	Ventura County	93043	
Naval Air Station	1	Alameda County	94501	
Naval Air Station	2	Fresno County	93245	
Naval Air Station	2	Kings County	93245	
Naval Air Station Facility	1	Imperial County	92243	
Naval Hospital	1	Alameda County	94627	
Naval Hospital	1	San Diego County		
Naval Postgraduate School	1	Monterey County	93943	
Naval Supply Center	1	Alameda County	94625	
Naval Training Center	1	San Diego County	92133	
Naval Weapons Center	1	Kern County		
Navarro	1	Mendocino County	95463	
Navelencia	1	Fresno County	93654	
Navregmedcen Balboa	1	San Diego County	92134	
Neal	1	Santa Clara County		
Nebelhorn	1	El Dorado County		
Nebo	1	San Bernardino County		
Nebo Center	1	San Bernardino County	92312	
Need	1	Sacramento County		
Needles	1	San Bernardino County	92363	
Neenach	1	Los Angeles County	93536	
Nelson	1	Butte County	95958	
Neponset	1	Monterey County		
Nervo	1	Sonoma County		
Nestor	1	San Diego County	92153	
Neufeld	1	Kern County		
Neuralia	1	Kern County		
Nevada	1	San Bernardino County		
Nevada City	1	Nevada County	95959	
Nevada Dock	1	Contra Costa County		
Nevin	1	Los Angeles County		
New Almaden	1	Santa Clara County	95042	
Newark	1	Alameda County	94560	
New Auberry	1	Fresno County	93602	
Newberry	1	San Bernardino County		
Newberry Springs	1	San Bernardino County	92365	
Newburg	1	Humboldt County	95540	
Newbury Park	1	Ventura County	91320	
Newcastle	1	Placer County	95658	
New Chicago	1	Amador County	95601	
New Cuyama	1	Santa Barbara County	93254	
New Dunn	1	San Bernardino County		
Newell	1	Modoc County	96134	
New England Mills	1	Placer County		
Newhall	1	Los Angeles County	91321	
Newhall Ranch	1	Los Angeles County	91350	
New London	1	Tulare County		
Newman	1	Stanislaus County	95360	
Newman Springs	1	Lake County		
New Monterey	1	Monterey County	93940	
New Pine Creek	1	Modoc County	97635	
Newport	1	Mendocino County		
Newport Beach	1	Orange County	92657	63
Newport Coast	1	Orange County	92657	
Newport Heights	1	Orange County		
Newport Island	1	Orange County		
Newtown	1	El Dorado County	95667	
Newtown	1	Nevada County	95959	
Newtown	1	Shasta County		
Newville	1	Glenn County	95963	
Nicasio	1	Marin County	94946	
Nice	1	Lake County	95464	
Nicholls Warm Springs	1	Riverside County		
Nichols	1	Contra Costa County	94568	
Nicklin	1	Riverside County		
Nicks Cove	1	Marin County		
Nicolaus	1	Sutter County	95659	
Nielsburg	1	Placer County		
Nightingale	1	Riverside County	92361	
Niguel Terrace	1	Orange County	92677	
Niland	1	Imperial County	92257	
Niles	1	Alameda County	94536	
Niles District	1	Alameda County		
Niles Junction	1	Alameda County		
Nimbus	1	Sacramento County	95670	
Nimshew	1	Butte County	95954	
Ninetynine Oaks	1	Los Angeles County		
Nipinnawasee	1	Madera County	93601	
Nipomo	1	San Luis Obispo County	93444	
Nipton	1	San Bernardino County	92364	
Nitroshell	1	Ventura County		
Nob Hill	1	San Francisco County		
Noel Heights	1	Sonoma County		
Noe Valley	1	San Francisco County	94114	
Norco	1	Riverside County	92860	
Nord	1	Butte County	95926	
Norden	1	Nevada County	95724	
Norlake	1	Mendocino County		
Normal Heights	1	San Diego County		
Norman	1	Glenn County		
North	1	Los Angeles County	91342	
North Annex	1	Los Angeles County	91342	
North Auburn	1	Placer County		
North Bay View Park	1	Monterey County	93941	
North Beach	1	San Francisco County	94133	
North Belridge	1	Kern County	93429	
North Berkeley	1	Alameda County	94709	
North Bloomfield	1	Nevada County	95959	
North Carlsbad	1	San Diego County	92054	
North City	1	San Diego County	92128	
North Clairemont	1	San Diego County		
North Columbia	1	Nevada County	95959	
Northcrest	1	Del Norte County	95531	
North Cucamonga	1	San Bernardino County	91730	
North Dinuba	1	Tulare County		
North Downey	1	Los Angeles County	90240	
Northeast Modesto	1	Stanislaus County	95350	
North Edwards	1	Kern County	93523	
North El Monte	1	Los Angeles County		
North Elsinore	1	Riverside County	92330	
North Fair Oaks	1	San Mateo County	94025	
North Fillmore	1	Ventura County	93015	
North Fork	1	Madera County	93643	
North Fork Rancheria	1	Madera County		
North Gardena	1	Los Angeles County	90247	
Northgate	1	Sacramento County		
North Glendale	1	Los Angeles County	91202	
North Highlands	1	Sacramento County	95660	
North Hills	1	Los Angeles County	91343	
North Hollywood	1	Los Angeles County	91601	17
North Inglewood	1	Los Angeles County	90302	
North Island Naval Air Station	1	San Diego County	92135	
North Jamul	1	San Diego County		
North Lakeport	1	Lake County		
North Loma Linda	1	San Bernardino County	92354	
North Long Beach	1	Los Angeles County	90805	
North Los Angeles	1	Los Angeles County		
North McCloud	1	Siskiyou County		
North Modesto	1	Stanislaus County		
North Muroc	1	Kern County		
North Oakland	1	Alameda County	94609	
North Oaks	1	Los Angeles County	91350	
North Palm Springs	1	Riverside County	92258	
North Park	1	San Diego County	92104	
North Pomona	1	Los Angeles County		
North Redlands	1	San Bernardino County		
North Redondo Beach	1	Los Angeles County	90278	
North Richmond	1	Contra Costa County	94801	
Northridge	1	Los Angeles County	91324	28
North Sacramento	1	Sacramento County	95815	
North Samoa	1	Humboldt County		
North San Diego	1	San Diego County		
North San Juan	1	Nevada County	95960	
North Santa Maria	1	Santa Barbara County		
North Santa Rosa	1	Sonoma County		
North Seal Beach	1	Orange County	90740	
North Shafter	1	Kern County	93263	
North Shore	1	Riverside County	92254	
Northspur	1	Mendocino County		
North Star	1	Yuba County		
North Torrance	1	Los Angeles County	90504	
North Turlock	1	Stanislaus County	95380	
North Wawona	1	Mariposa County		
North Whittier	1	Los Angeles County	91746	
North Whittier Heights	1	Los Angeles County	91748	
North Wilmington	1	Los Angeles County		
Northwood	1	Sonoma County		
North Woodbridge	1	San Joaquin County		
Northwood Heights	1	Sonoma County		
Northwood Lodge	1	Sonoma County		
Norton	1	San Joaquin County		
Norton	1	Yolo County		
Norton Air Force Base	1	San Bernardino County	92409	
Nortonville	1	Contra Costa County		
Norwalk	1	Los Angeles County	90650	
Norwalk Manor	1	Los Angeles County	90650	
Notarb	1	Madera County		
Novato	1	Marin County	94947	
Noyo	1	Mendocino County	95437	
Nubieber	1	Lassen County	96068	
Nuestro	1	Sutter County		
Nuevo	1	Riverside County	92567	
Number Fifty Seven	1	San Francisco County	94108	
Number Forty	1	San Francisco County	94103	
Number Twenty Three	1	San Francisco County	94103	
Nut Tree	1	Solano County	95688	
Nyland	1	Ventura County		
Nyland Acres	1	Ventura County	93030	
