= List of United Kingdom locations: New T-Ney =

The United Kingdom

This is part of the list of United Kingdom locations: a gazetteer of place names in the United Kingdom showing each place's locality and geographical coordinates.

== New (continued) ==
=== New Totley – Newtyle ===
Location	Locality	Coordinates (links to map & photo sources)	OS grid reference
New Totley	Sheffield	53.30°N 01.53°W	SK3179
New Town (Chew Magna)	Bath and North East Somerset	51.34°N 02.60°W	ST5861
New Town (Hinton Charterhouse)	Bath and North East Somerset	51.31°N 02.33°W	ST7757
New Town (Basildon)	Berkshire	51.47°N 01.13°W	SU6075
New Town (Reading)	Berkshire	51.45°N 00.95°W	SU7373
New Town (Kington Magna)	Dorset	50.99°N 02.34°W	ST7622
New Town (Farnham)	Dorset	50.93°N 02.08°W	ST9415
New Town (Sixpenny Handley)	Dorset	50.96°N 02.02°W	ST9818
New Town (Witchampton)	Dorset	50.86°N 02.01°W	ST9907
New Town	East Sussex	50.96°N 00.09°E	TQ4720
New Town	Gloucestershire	51.98°N 01.94°W	SP0432
New Town (Dartford)	Kent	51.44°N 00.21°E	TQ5474
New Town (West Malling)	Kent	51.28°N 00.39°E	TQ6757
New Town (Halling)	Kent	51.34°N 00.44°E	TQ7064
New Town	Lancashire	53.81°N 02.60°W	SD6036
New Town	Luton	51.86°N 00.41°W	TL0920
New Town	Oxfordshire	51.95°N 01.63°W	SP2529
New Town	Sandwell	52.51°N 02.04°W	SO9791
New Town (Wedmore)	Somerset	51.20°N 02.77°W	ST4645
New Town (Yeovil)	Somerset	50.94°N 02.62°W	ST5616
New Town (Milborne Port)	Somerset	50.96°N 02.48°W	ST6618
New Town	City of Southampton	50.88°N 01.36°W	SU4510
New Town	South Tyneside	54.94°N 01.47°W	NZ3461
New Town	Sunderland	54.83°N 01.47°W	NZ3449
New Town	Swindon	51.55°N 01.78°W	SU1584
New Town	Wakefield	53.70°N 01.31°W	SE4523
New Town	Walsall	52.65°N 01.92°W	SK0506
New Town	West Sussex	51.04°N 00.31°W	TQ1829
New Town (Enford)	Wiltshire	51.24°N 01.80°W	SU1450
New Town (Ramsbury)	Wiltshire	51.43°N 01.59°W	SU2871
New Town	East Lothian	55.92°N 02.89°W	NT4470
New Town	City of Edinburgh	55.95°N 03.20°W	NT2574
Newtown	Birmingham	52.49°N 01.91°W	SP0688
Newtown	Buckinghamshire	51.70°N 00.61°W	SP9602
Newtown (Kimbolton)	Cambridgeshire	52.29°N 00.40°W	TL0968
Newtown (Huntingdon)	Cambridgeshire		TL2472
Newtown (Frodsham)	Cheshire	53.29°N 02.72°W	SJ5278
Newtown (Poynton)	Cheshire	53.34°N 02.10°W	SJ9383
Newtown (Germoe)	Cornwall	50.11°N 05.40°W	SW5729
Newtown (North Hill)	Cornwall	50.57°N 04.41°W	SX2978
Newtown (Holme St Cuthbert)	Cumbria	54.81°N 03.41°W	NY0948
Newtown (Carlisle)	Cumbria	54.88°N 02.96°W	NY3855
Newtown (Irthington)	Cumbria	54.95°N 02.79°W	NY4962
Newtown	Derbyshire	53.36°N 02.01°W	SJ9984
Newtown (Bishop's Nympton)	Devon	51.01°N 03.76°W	SS7625
Newtown (Talaton)	Devon	50.78°N 03.33°W	SY0699
Newtown (Exeter)	Devon	50.72°N 03.51°W	SX9392
Newtown (Poole)	Dorset	50.73°N 01.94°W	SZ0493
Newtown (Beaminster)	Dorset	50.81°N 02.73°W	ST4802
Newtown	County Durham	54.57°N 01.32°W	NZ4319
Newtown (Sharpness)	Gloucestershire	51.70°N 02.47°W	SO6701
Newtown (Stonehouse)	Gloucestershire	51.74°N 02.30°W	SO7905
Newtown (Tewkesbury)	Gloucestershire	51.98°N 02.14°W	SO9032
Newtown (Minstead)	Hampshire	50.88°N 01.61°W	SU2710
Newtown (Sherfield English)	Hampshire	51.00°N 01.57°W	SU3023
Newtown (parish, near Newbury)	Hampshire	51.36°N 01.32°W	SU4763
Newtown (Warsash)	Hampshire	50.84°N 01.30°W	SU4905
Newtown (Bishop's Waltham)	Hampshire	50.95°N 01.23°W	SU5417
Newtown (Soberton)	Hampshire	50.90°N 01.13°W	SU6112
Newtown (Alton)	Hampshire	51.13°N 00.98°W	SU7138
Newtown (Gosport)	Hampshire	50.78°N 01.13°W	SZ6199
Newtown (Holme Lacy)	Herefordshire	51.99°N 02.68°W	SO5333
Newtown (Yarkhill)	Herefordshire	52.09°N 02.57°W	SO6144
Newtown	Isle of Wight	50.70°N 01.40°W	SZ4290
Newtown	Lancashire	53.65°N 02.74°W	SD5118
Newtown	Norfolk	52.62°N 01.72°E	TG5209
Newtown (Whitton and Tosson)	Northumberland	55.29°N 01.95°W	NU0300
Newtown (Lilburn)	Northumberland	55.51°N 01.93°W	NU0425
Newtown	Oxfordshire	51.52°N 00.90°W	SU7681
Newtown	Salford	53.51°N 02.34°W	SD7702
Newtown (Baschurch)	Shropshire	52.79°N 02.86°W	SJ4222
Newtown (Wem)	Shropshire	52.87°N 02.77°W	SJ4831
Newtown (Much Wenlock)	Shropshire	52.59°N 02.56°W	SJ6200
Newtown (Buckland St Mary)	Somerset	50.90°N 03.03°W	ST2712
Newtown (Bridgwater)	Somerset	51.12°N 03.01°W	ST2937
Newtown (Biddulph)	Staffordshire	53.13°N 02.15°W	SJ9060
Newtown (Essington)	Staffordshire	52.63°N 02.01°W	SJ9904
Newtown (Fawfieldhead)	Staffordshire	53.16°N 01.91°W	SK0663
Newtown	St Helens	53.44°N 02.76°W	SJ4995
Newtown	West Sussex	51.06°N 00.80°W	SU8430
Newtown	Wigan	53.54°N 02.66°W	SD5605
Newtown (West Tisbury)	Wiltshire	51.06°N 02.12°W	ST9129
Newtown (Shalbourne)	Wiltshire	51.36°N 01.57°W	SU3063
Newtown (Martley)	Worcestershire	52.21°N 02.36°W	SO7557
Newtown (Droitwich Spa)	Worcestershire	52.26°N 02.17°W	SO8863
Newtown	Blaenau Gwent	51.78°N 03.20°W	SO1710
Newtown	Caerphilly	51.61°N 03.14°W	ST2191
Newtown	Powys	52.50°N 03.31°W	SO1191
Newtown	Rhondda, Cynon, Taff	51.67°N 03.37°W	ST0598
Newtown	Isle of Man	54.12°N 04.57°W	SC3273
Newtown	Argyll and Bute	56.21°N 05.08°W	NN0907
Newtown	Falkirk	56.00°N 03.62°W	NS9980
Newtown-in-St Martin	Cornwall	50.06°N 05.15°W	SW7423
Newtown Linford	Leicestershire	52.68°N 01.24°W	SK5110
Newtown St Boswells	Scottish Borders	55.57°N 02.67°W	NT5731
Newtown Unthank	Leicestershire	52.63°N 01.27°W	SK4904
New Tredegar	Caerphilly	51.71°N 03.24°W	SO1403
New Trows	South Lanarkshire	55.62°N 03.90°W	NS8038
New Tupton	Derbyshire	53.18°N 01.43°W	SK3865
Newtyle	Angus	56.55°N 03.15°W	NO2941

=== New U – New Z ===
Location	Locality	Coordinates (links to map & photo sources)	OS grid reference
New Ulva	Argyll and Bute	55.95°N 05.68°W	NR7080
New Village	East Riding of Yorkshire	53.77°N 00.40°W	TA0532
New Village	Doncaster	53.54°N 01.15°W	SE5606
New Waltham	North East Lincolnshire	53.51°N 00.07°W	TA2804
New Well	Powys	52.37°N 03.36°W	SO0776
New Wells	Powys	52.54°N 03.25°W	SO1595
New Whittington	Derbyshire	53.27°N 01.41°W	SK3975
New Wimpole	Cambridgeshire	52.12°N 00.04°W	TL3449
New Winton	East Lothian	55.92°N 02.92°W	NT4271
New Woodhouses	Shropshire	52.96°N 02.61°W	SJ5941
New Works	Shropshire	52.66°N 02.50°W	SJ6608
New Wortley	Leeds	53.78°N 01.57°W	SE2832
New Yatt	Oxfordshire	51.81°N 01.46°W	SP3713
Newyears Green	Hillingdon	51.58°N 00.45°W	TQ0788
New York	North Tyneside	55.02°N 01.50°W	NZ3270
New York	North Yorkshire	54.05°N 01.71°W	SE1962
New York	Lincolnshire	53.07°N 00.15°W	TF2455
New Zealand	Wiltshire	51.49°N 01.98°W	SU0177

== Nex ==
Location	Locality	Coordinates (links to map & photo sources)	OS grid reference
Nextend	Herefordshire	52.20°N 02.98°W	SO3357

== Ney ==
Location	Locality	Coordinates (links to map & photo sources)	OS grid reference
Neyland	Pembrokeshire	51.70°N 04.95°W	SM9605
