= Newtonville =

Newtonville may refer to:

== Places ==
Canada

- Newtonville, Ontario

United States

- Newtonville, Indiana
- Newtonville, Massachusetts, one of thirteen villages in Newton, Massachusetts
  - Newtonville (MBTA station)
- Newtonville, New Jersey
- Newtonville, New York, a hamlet in Colonie, Albany County, New York

== See also ==
- Newton (disambiguation)
- Newtown (disambiguation)
- New Town (disambiguation)
- Newville (disambiguation)
- New City (disambiguation)
- Villeneuve (disambiguation)
