= Newton Station =

Newton Station may refer to:

- Newton station (Kansas), an Amtrak station in Newton, Kansas, US
- Newton station (Mississippi), a historic train station in Newton, Mississippi, US
- Newton railway station, a railway station located in Greater Glasgow, Scotland
- Newton for Hyde railway station, serving the Newton area of Hyde in Greater Manchester, England
- Newton Heath railway station, a former railway station in Greater Manchester, England
- Newton Heath and Moston tram stop, a light rail station in Greater Manchester, England
- Newton Abbot railway station, serving the town of Newton Abbot in Devon, England
- Newton MRT station, an underground Mass Rapid Transit station on the North South Line and Downtown Line in Singapore
- Newton Corner station, a bus station in Newton, Massachusetts, US, formerly a railway station known as Newton
- Newtonville station, a railway station in Newton, Massachusetts, US
- West Newton station, a railway station in Newton, Massachusetts, US
- Newton Centre station, a light rail station in Newton, Massachusetts, US
- Newton Highlands station, a light rail station in Newton, Massachusetts, US
- Newton Road railway station, a former station in West Bromwich, England

== See also ==
- Newton (disambiguation)
- Newtown station (disambiguation)
