= Newtown, Virginia =

Newtown, Virginia may refer to:

- Newtown, Albemarle County, Virginia
- Newtown, Greene County, Virginia
- Newtown, King and Queen County, Virginia
- Newtown, Lancaster County, Virginia
- Newtown, Virginia Beach, Virginia, in Princess Anne County, Virginia
- Stephens City, Virginia, which was formerly known as Newtown
- Newtown, Virginia (historical community), now Northeast section of Harrisonburg, Virginia
