= Auburndale station (MBTA) =

Commuter rail station in Newton, Massachusetts

Auburndale
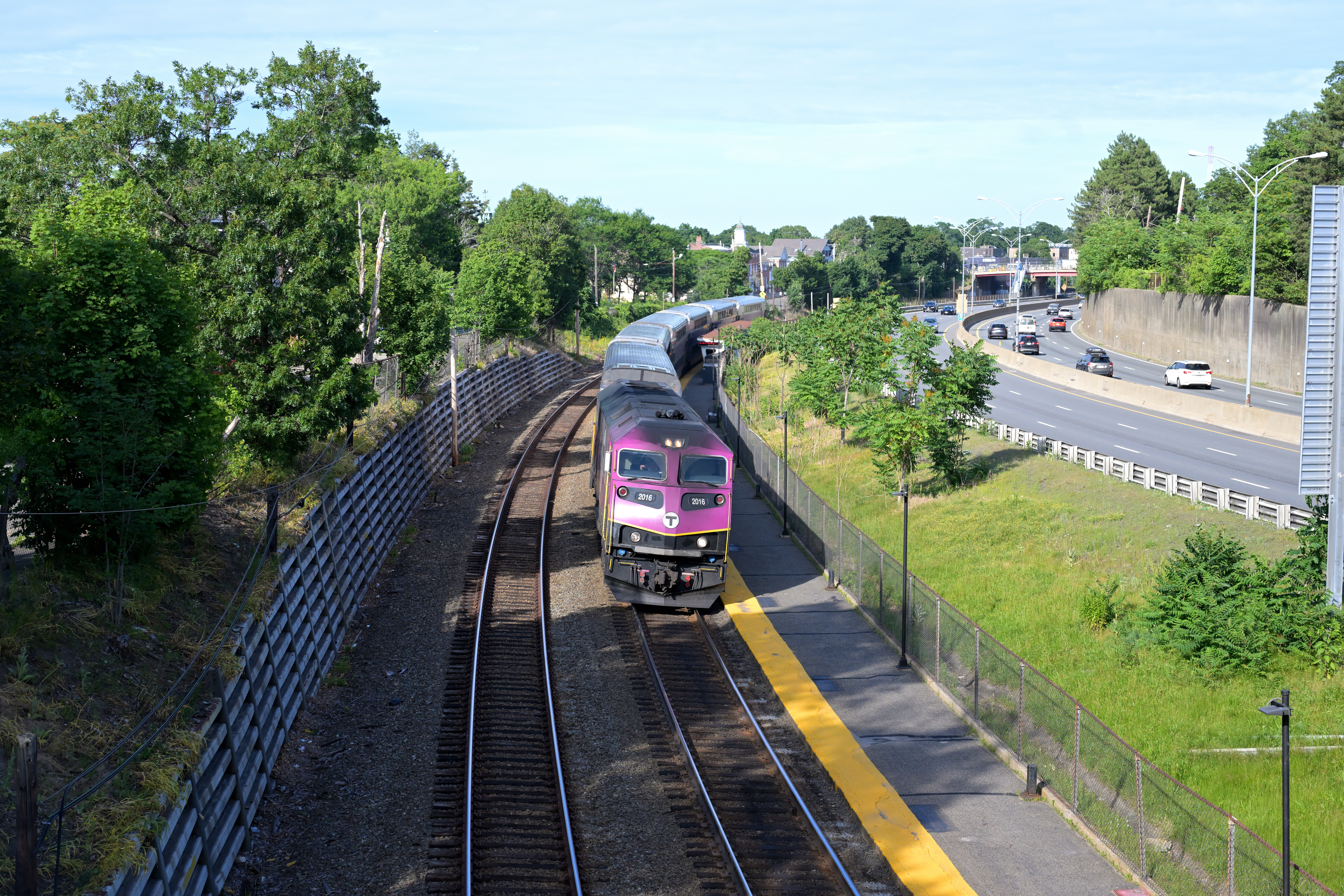
- An outbound train at Auburndale in June 2025

General information
- Location: 477 Lexington Street; Auburndale, Newton, Massachusetts
- Coordinates: 42.3458°N 71.2503°W
- Line: Worcester Main Line
- Platforms: 1 side platform
- Tracks: 2

Construction
- Parking: 35 spaces
- Cycle facilities: Racks available

Other information
- Fare zone: 2

History
- Opened: Early 1850s
- Rebuilt: 1881, 1961

Passengers
- 2024: 171 daily boardings

Services
Preceding station	MBTA	Following station
Wellesley Farms toward Worcester	Framingham/Worcester Line	West Newton toward South Station
Former services
Preceding station	New York Central Railroad	Following station
Riverside toward Albany	Boston and Albany Railroad Main Line	West Newton toward Boston
Location

Auburndale station is an MBTA Commuter Rail station in Auburndale, Massachusetts. It serves the Framingham/Worcester Line. It is located next to the Massachusetts Turnpike near Lasell College. The modern station platform, built around 1961, replaced a highly acclaimed 1881 depot building designed by H. H. Richardson. A full renovation of the station for accessibility is planned.

== History ==
=== Opening ===
The Boston and Worcester Railroad opened the segment from West Newton to Wellesley Hills in July 1834. A second track was added in 1839, and in 1843 the railroad began offering season fares for around $60, making it one of the first commuter rail systems. Due to the popularity of the other Newton stops, a station at Auburn Dale (soon Auburndale) was opened by the late 1840s. A new station building was constructed in 1850–51 at an expense of $1,219. It was located on the south side of the tracks in a large open area at the intersection of Auburn Street, Lexington Street, and several other roads. In 1867, the Boston & Worcester joined with the Western Railroad to become the Boston & Albany Railroad.

=== H.H. Richardson depot ===
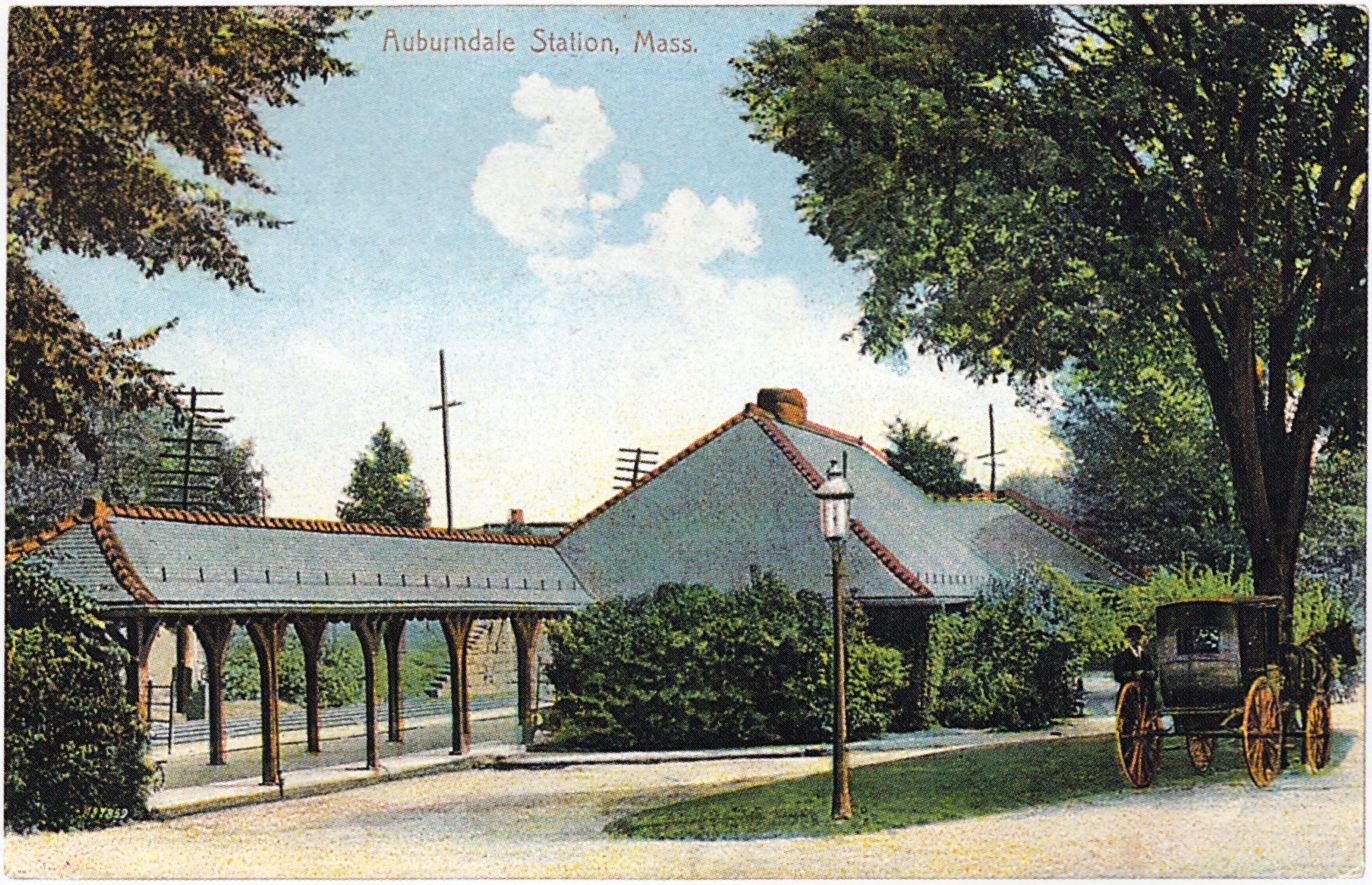
1881 station on an early color postcard

Beginning in 1881, the Boston & Albany began a massive improvement program that included the building of over 30 new stations along its main line as well as the Highland branch, which it bought in 1883. Acclaimed architect H. H. Richardson was hired to design several stations (eventually nine) along the line, starting with Auburndale. Although not as grand as some of his other B&A works like Framingham and Palmer stations, the Auburndale station's design was highly praised. Henry-Russell Hitchcock called it "the best he ever built" in The Architecture of H.H. Richardson and His Time, and a 1904 architecture journal claimed that Richardson's depots at Auburndale and Chestnut Hill "created a new standard of way-station construction."

The 1881 station was constructed in Richardson's signature Richardsonian Romanesque style, with influence from Japanese architecture as well as Romanesque Revival architecture. The one-story building was built from "red and light grey granite", with "heavy masonry and dominant roof." The interior was divided into a pair of waiting rooms for men and women, with a ticket counter between. The platform was shaded by a canopy, which wrapped around the east end of the building into a porte-cochère. Construction, by the Norcross Brothers firm, cost $16,290. As with a number of other stations on the line, Frederick Law Olmsted designed the landscaping, which included large trees, shrubs, and Japanese ivy. A replica of the station, still standing, was built by the Buffalo, Rochester and Pittsburgh Railway in 1911 in Orchard Park, New York.

=== Demolition and modern era ===
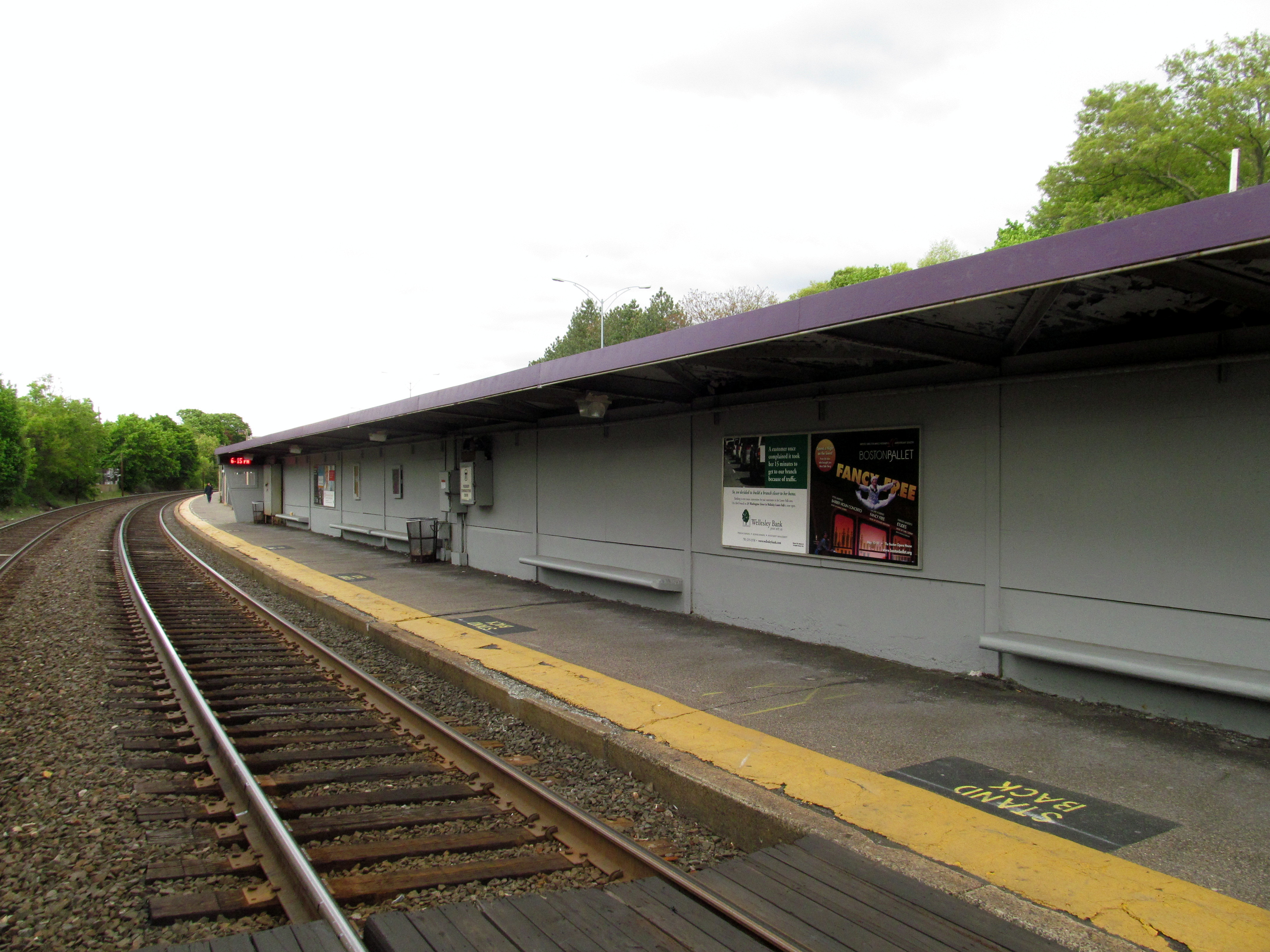
Modern metal shelter and bare platform

Despite the accolades, H. H. Richardson's depot was torn down in 1961 after 80 years in service. The extension of the Massachusetts Turnpike from Route 128 to downtown Boston involved removing two of the line's four tracks from Auburndale to downtown. The historic stations at Auburndale, West Newton, Newtonville, Newton Corner, and Brighton were demolished; only the Allston depot survived. Auburndale, West Newton, and Newtonville stayed in service, but with extremely diminished facilities – bare asphalt platforms with simple metal shelters. The single side platform provides access to only one of the line's two tracks; passengers use short asphalt strips to access trains on the other track. The 1961-built platform stretches from Woodland Street to Auburn Street, just west of the previous station locations.

Service to West Newton and Auburndale stations was reduced to one daily round trip on January 30, 1981, as part of a series of service cuts due to a budget crisis. Normal service resumed to the two stations on March 16, 1981.

=== Planned renovations ===
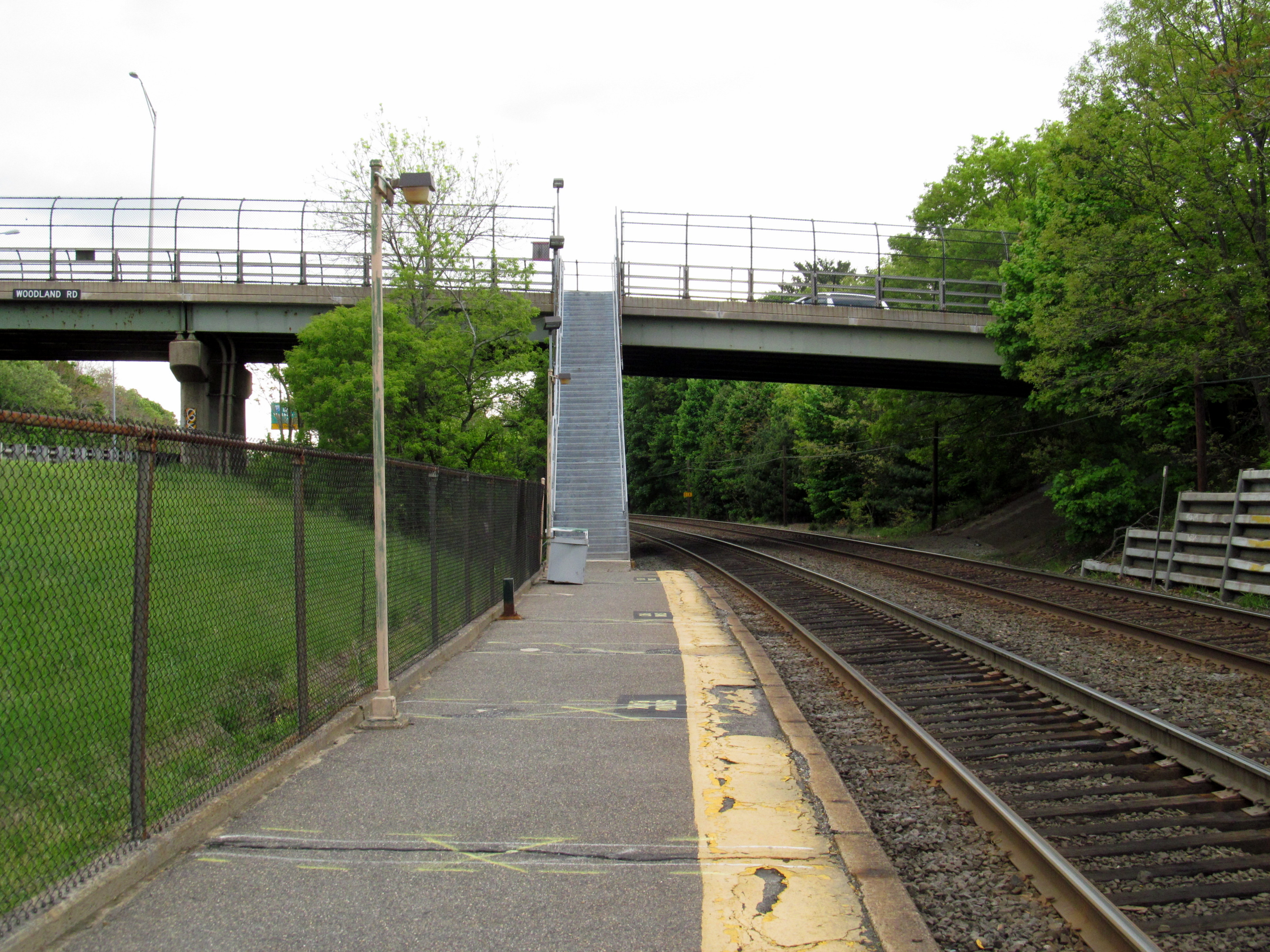
Due to the low-level platforms and the stairs to street level, Auburndale is not currently accessible

The bare platform and steep metal stairs make Auburndale station inaccessible. In the future, the station is planned to be rebuilt with a high-level platform and elevators or ramps to street level to meet ADA guidelines. In April 2004, the Boston Regional Metropolitan Planning Organization voted to add $368,000 (funded by a federal earmark) for planning Auburndale renovations to its 2004-2008 spending plan. However, the project was not pursued at that time.

Beginning in 2008, Representative Barney Frank secured $3 million in funding for design of the replacement station. 30% design plans were released in July 2013, at which point construction was estimated to cost $11.5 million. 100% design was completed in January 2017, with construction scheduled for April 2017.

The 100% design was unveiled at a public meeting in February 2017. It includes a full-length high-level platform on the north side of the tracks, with ramps to provide an accessible route to the village center. Because the platform would be on the opposite side of the tracks from the other Newton stations, a new interlocking would be added east of the station. Although the improved access to the village center was popular with residents, the new station design was criticized by transit advocates because it would likely degrade service on the line. Trains switching tracks to access Auburndale station would prevent trains from passing in the opposite direction, which could reduce the number of trains that could be operated on the line. The MBTA did not perform traffic modeling to determine whether the station design would cause operational issues.

The proposal was abandoned due to service impacts. A new set of accessibility plans, with all three Newton stations receiving identical new platforms on the north side, were announced in 2019. Design reached 30% in November 2020 and was expected to be complete in spring 2022. The designs were later changed to have two platforms to reduce operational impacts. The new design reached 30% completion in early 2022, with design completion expected in February 2024. Drilling for geotechnical surveying took place in October–December 2022. Design work for the Newton stations was paused at 75% completion in September 2023 because project costs had risen to $255 million.

The MBTA unsuccessfully applied for a federal grant for the projects in January 2024. In April 2024, lacking the federal funding, the MBTA indicated that it would proceed with Newtonville before Auburndale or West Newton.
