= North Star House =

North Star House may refer to:

- North Star House (Grass Valley, California), US
- North Star, California, formerly North Star House, California, US; see List of places in California (N)
