= Newton-on-Ayr =

Newton-on-Ayr may refer to:

- Newton-on-Ayr, a neighbourhood of the town of Ayr in South Ayrshire, Scotland
- Newton-on-Ayr railway station, in the Newton-on-Ayr neighbourhood

== See also ==
- River Ayr
- Ayr (disambiguation)
- Newton (disambiguation)
