= Newton =

Newton most commonly refers to:

- Isaac Newton (1643–1727), English polymath
- Newton (unit), SI unit of force

Newton may also refer to:

== Arts and entertainment ==
- Newton (film), a 2017 Indian film
- Newton (band), Spanish electronic music group
- Newton (singer), British singer and former firefighter.
- Newton (Blake), a print by William Blake
- Newton (Paolozzi), a 1995 bronze sculpture by Eduardo Paolozzi
- Cecil Newton (Coronation Street), a character in the British soap opera Coronation Street
- Curtis Newton, "real" name of pulp magazine character Captain Future
- George Newton, a character in the film series Beethoven
- Newton Gearloose, a Disney character, nephew of Gyro Gearloose
- Newton, a character in The Mighty Hercules animated series
- Newton Pud, a character in LittleBigPlanet 3

== People ==
- Newton (surname), including a list of people with the surname
- Newton (given name), including a list of people with the given name

== Places ==
- List of places called Newton in the United Kingdom
- Newton, South Australia, Australia
- Newtown Cunningham, County Donegal, a village, Ireland
- Newton, Singapore
- Newton Station (disambiguation)

=== Canada ===
- Mount Newton (Yukon), a mountain in Canada
- Newton, Edmonton, Alberta
- Newton, Surrey, British Columbia

=== New Zealand ===
- Newton, New Zealand
- Newton (New Zealand electorate), a 19th-century parliamentary constituency in Auckland

=== United States ===
- Newton, Alabama, a town
- Newton County, Arkansas
- Newton, Georgia, a city
- Newton County, Georgia
- Newton, Illinois, a city
- Newton County, Indiana
- Newton, Iowa, a city
- Newton, Kansas, a city
- Newton, Massachusetts, a city
- Newton, Mississippi, a city
- Newton County, Mississippi
- Newton County, Missouri
- Newton, New Hampshire, a town
- Newton, New Jersey, a town
- Newton, North Carolina, a city
- Newton, Texas, a city
- Newton County, Texas
- Newton, Utah, a town
- Newton, Washington, an unincorporated community
- Newton, West Virginia, an unincorporated community
- Newton, Wisconsin (disambiguation), several places
- Newton Township (disambiguation), several places

== Science and technology ==
=== Astronomy and physics ===
- 8000 Isaac Newton, a minor planet
- Newton (lunar crater)
- Newton (Martian crater)
- Newton scale, temperature scale devised by Isaac Newton
- XMM-Newton, an orbiting X-ray observatory

=== Computing ===
- Apple Newton, a series of personal digital assistants by Apple Computer
  - Newton OS, an operating system for the Apple Newton
- Newton (software), an email application by CloudMagic
- Newton Game Dynamics, a free physics engine for simulating rigid bodies in games

=== Other science ===
- Hurricane Newton, several tropical cyclones

== Other uses ==
- Newton Vineyard, a wine estate in California, United States
- Newtons (cookie), a Nabisco cookie

== See also ==
- New Town (disambiguation)
- Newtown (disambiguation)
- Newtonville (disambiguation)
- The Newton Letter, a 1982 novella by John Banville
