= Newton Township, Michigan =

Newton Township is the name of some places in the U.S. state of Michigan:

- Newton Township, Calhoun County, Michigan
- Newton Township, Mackinac County, Michigan

== See also ==
- Newton Township (disambiguation)
