= Newtown Township =

Newtown Township may refer to several places in the United States:

- Newtown Township, Livingston County, Illinois
- Newtown Township, Bucks County, Pennsylvania
- Newtown Township, Delaware County, Pennsylvania

== See also ==
- Newtown (disambiguation)
- Newton Township (disambiguation)
