= Lancaster Smokehouse =

Barbeque restaurant in Kitchener, Canada

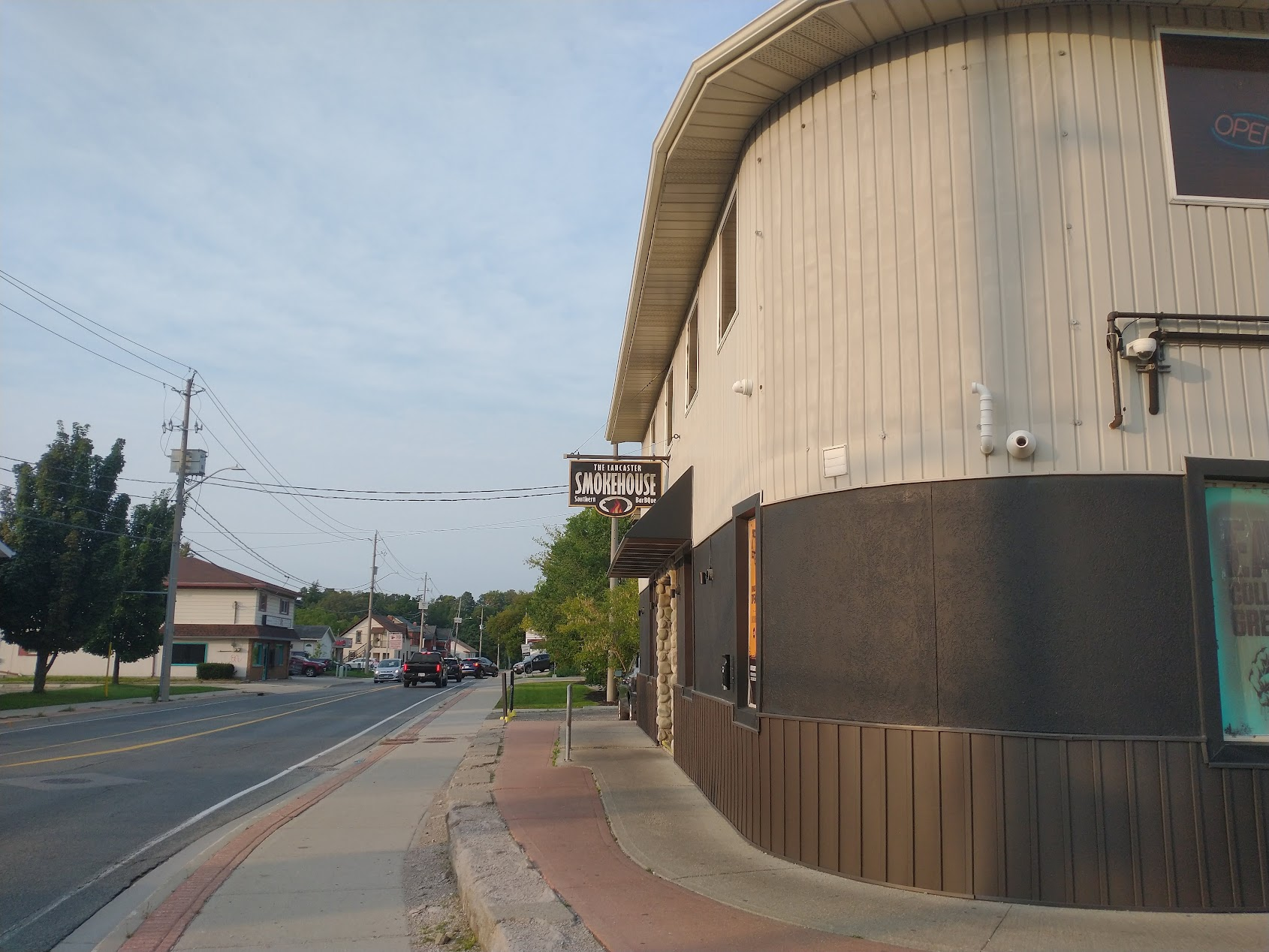
- The Smokehouse in 2023
- Interactive map of Lancaster Smokehouse

Restaurant information
- Established: 2011; 15 years ago
- Owners: Chris Corrigan and Cathy Corrigan
- Previous owner: Mike Kelly
- Food type: Southern barbeque
- Location: 574 Lancaster St. W., Kitchener, Ontario, Canada
- Coordinates: 43.479660°N 80.484245°W
- Seating capacity: 600
- Website: lancsmokehouse.com

The Lancaster Smokehouse (colloquially The Lanc) is a southern-style barbeque restaurant in Kitchener, Ontario, Canada at 574 Lancaster Street West.

The restaurant is located at a historical building, which was built as a railroad hotel in the 1840s. It was heavily renovated after 4 fires between 1992 and 1994. The building was purchased by Hog Tails in 2011, becoming their second location. The restaurant mostly serves meat-focused dishes which are smoked using aged hickory. The restaurant began a trend of Southern food restaurants in Waterloo Region.

== History ==
=== Use as hotel and tavern ===
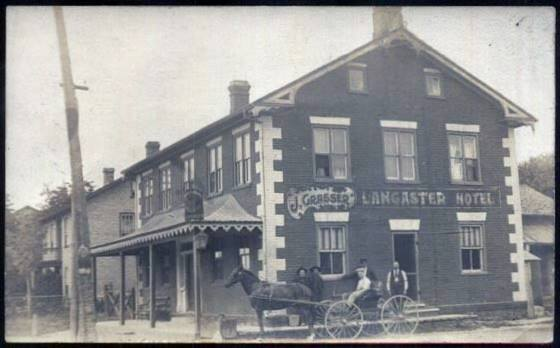
The Lancaster Hotel ca. 1900

The Lancaster House was a railroad hotel built in the 1840s located at 574 Lancaster St. W. It was the first hotel built in Bridgeport, Ontario. The hotel's license was issued to Gottlieb Bitzer. In 1896, the building was purchased by John Grasser from Habfried Hunderhager. In the 1930s, the building was used as a meeting space and held a 85-person dining room; Herman Wagner owned the building at this time. David Kirby, who owned the Tavern from 1956 to 1976, established the Ocean Queen lounge: a nautical-themed jazz venue.

Between 1992 and 1994, there were a series of four fires which resulted in the building being completely renovated. During this period, Mike Kelly owned the building. The first fire, in February 1992 was caused by a cigarette; the second, in May 1992, was thought to be caused by light bulbs and destroyed the tavern's top floor. Both the third and fourth fires were arsons: they occurred in February 1993 and July 1994. The Tavern continued to operate as a bar and Dixieland jazz venue.

=== Purchase by Hogtails ===
Hog Tails, a Waterloo-based southern barbeque restaurant, was opened in 2009 by Chris and Cathy Corrigan. Due to their lack of seating and lengthy wait times, the restaurant looked for a second location and purchased the Tavern from Kelly in 2011. The restaurant was renamed to the Lancaster Smokehouse, and the Corrigans renovated its kitchen and dining area—which seats 600. Darryl Haus purchased the original Waterloo Hog Tails location in 2015 and it later permanently closed.

The Corrigans stated the weekly Dixieland jazz shows would continue; the shows were later moved elsewhere. As of a 2016 Waterloo Region Record article, the Smokehouse now hosts weekly blues shows. The Smokehouse was featured on the Food Network show You Gotta Eat Here!. The segment was recorded in 2013 and was broadcast in 2014. The Smokehouse added a concrete outdoor patio in the early 2020s.

== Food and menu ==
The Lancaster Smokehouse serves southern-style barbeque with mostly meat-focused dishes, for example, Texas short ribs, Nashville Hot Chicken, Po' Boy, and Beef Brisket. According to Andrew Coppolino of CBC News, the Smokehouse recognizes "the pigtail's historic place at the Waterloo County table" by having it on the menu. For drinks, local beers, wines, bourbons, Southern-themed cocktails, and soft drinks are served. The meats are smoked using aged hickory and large pieces of meat are smoked overnight. Food portions are large, with Jasmine Mangalaseril of The Record writing "we [left] with a couple days' lunches and suppers in hand". Dessert is provided by Crumb Bakehouse, a sister company of the Smokehouse.

== Reception ==
According to a 2012 Record article, HogTails and the Smokehouse started a trend of Southern food restaurants in Waterloo Region. Sandra Walneck of The Record reviewed the restaurant in 2016. Walneck praised the food and atmosphere, but criticized the slow service and some of the dishes.
