= Seth Davis House =

Historic house in Massachusetts, United States

- U.S. National Register of Historic Places
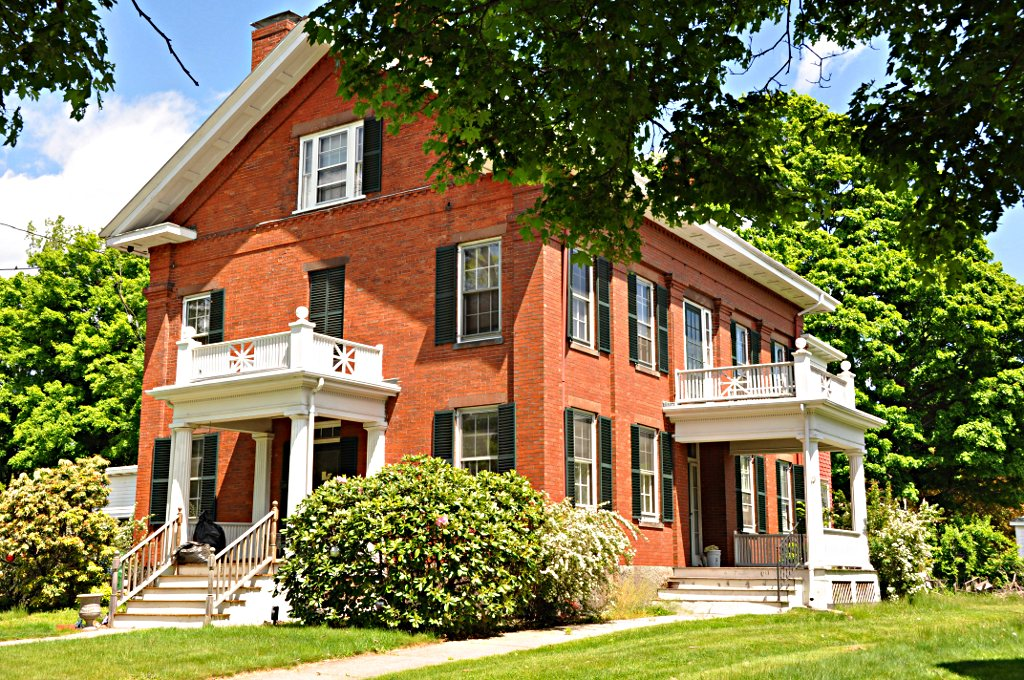

- Location within Massachusetts Location within the United States
- Location: 32 Eden Ave., Newton, Massachusetts
- Coordinates: 42°21′03.8″N 71°13′27.7″W
- Built: 1825
- Architectural style: Greek Revival
- MPS: Newton MRA
- NRHP reference No.: 86001960
- Added to NRHP: September 04, 1986

The Seth Davis House is a historic house located at 32 Eden Avenue in Newton, Massachusetts.

== Description and history ==
The 2 1/2-story brick house was built in the 1820s by Seth Davis, a locally prominent teacher and real estate investor, and is one of the finest Greek Revival houses in the city. It is unusual for having brick detailing instead of wood for the cornices. Seth Davis was a major investor in West Newton's Railroad Hotel, and owned much land in the area. Davis Street, Davis Court, and the Davis School are all named in his honor.

The house was listed on the National Register of Historic Places on September 4, 1986.

== See also ==
- National Register of Historic Places listings in Newton, Massachusetts
