= New Town =

A new town is a generic name for a planned community, or a planned expansion of a community.

New Town may also refer to:

== Music ==
- New Town (Jandek album)
- New Town (Koop Arponen album)
- New Town, song by Dutch YouTuber Jelly

== Places ==
=== Australia ===
- New Town, South Australia, a suburb of Kadina
- New Town, Tasmania, a suburb of Hobart

=== Canada ===
- New Town, former name of Montreal neighbourhood Golden Square Mile

=== China ===
- Zhujiang New Town, Guangzhou, Guangdong Province

=== Czechia ===
- New Town, Prague (Nové Město), a district of Prague

=== Finland ===
- Uusikaupunki ("New Town" in Finnish; Swedish: Nystad)

=== Ghana ===
- New Town, Ghana, Western Region

=== India ===
- Rajarhat, also called New Town, Kolkata
- New Town, Kolkata

=== Japan ===
- Tama New Town, Tama, Tokyo
- Senboku New Town, Osaka

=== Malta ===
- Paola, Malta, also known as Raħal Ġdid (new town in Maltese)

=== Pakistan ===
- New Town, Karachi, also called Binori Town

=== Poland ===
- Warsaw New Town, an old district of Warsaw

=== Slovakia ===
- Nové Mesto, Bratislava (New Town in English), a borough in Bratislava

=== Slovenia ===
- Novo mesto (New Town in English)

=== United Kingdom ===
- New Town, Luton, a district of Luton, Bedfordshire
- New Town, Stevenage, Hertfordshire
- New Town, Southampton, a district of the city of Southampton, Hampshire
- New Town, Ashford, Kent, original spelling of Newtown, Kent
- New Town, Walsall, a district of Walsall, West Midlands
- New Town, Enford, Wiltshire
- New Town, Ramsbury, Wiltshire
- New Town (Colchester ward), Essex
- New Town (Newham ward), London
- New Town, Edinburgh, the centre of Edinburgh

=== United States ===
- New Town, California, the former name of Nubieber, California
- New Town, California, the former name of Newtown, El Dorado County, California
- New Town (Jacksonville), a neighborhood in Jacksonville, Florida
- New Town (Key West), a neighborhood within the City of Key West, Florida
- New Town, Georgia
- New Town, Louisiana, the former British name of New Iberia, Louisiana
- New Town, North Dakota
- New Town, South Carolina, the former name of Myrtle Beach
- New Town, a historically African American neighborhood in Marshall, Texas
- Newe Towne, the former name of Cambridge, Massachusetts
- New Towne, a neighborhood in colonial Jamestown, Virginia
- New Towne Mall, a shopping mall in New Philadelphia, Ohio

=== Zimbabwe ===
- New Town, Kwekwe, a suburb of Kwekwe

== Town planning ==
- New town (Alberta), a former municipal status in Alberta, Canada, from 1956
- New towns of Hong Kong, since the 1950s
- New towns of Singapore, since 1952
- New towns in the United Kingdom, designated under Acts of Parliament since 1946
- New towns movement

== See also ==
- Garden city movement
- Newton (disambiguation)
- Newtonville (disambiguation)
- Newtown (disambiguation)
