= Newtown, Ikerrin =

There are two townlands with the name Newtown, (Irish: An Baile Nua) in the Barony of Ikerrin in County Tipperary, Ireland.

- Newtown in the civil parish of Bourney
- Newtown in the civil parish of Corbally

There are nineteen townlands known as Newtown in the whole of County Tipperary.
