= Newtown station =

Newtown station may refer to:

- Newtown railway station, Sydney
- Newtown railway station (Wales), in Powys, Wales
- New Mills Newtown railway station, Derbyshire, England
- Newtown station (SEPTA), Newtown, Pennsylvania, USA

== See also ==
- Newton station (disambiguation)
