= Nashmead, California =

Unincorporated community in California, United States

Nashmead
- Unincorporated community
- Location in California Nashmead (the United States)
- Coordinates: 39°49′21″N 123°24′53″W
- Country: United States
- State: California
- County: Mendocino
- Elevation: 814 ft (248 m)

Nashmead (formerly Nash) is an unincorporated community in Mendocino County, California, United States. It is located on the Eel River and Northwestern Pacific Railroad, 4 miles (6.4 km) south-southeast of Spyrock, at an elevation of 814 feet (248 m).

Nashmead began as a railroad stop with a store, hotel, and a few vacation cabins. For a time, Nashmead was a transfer point for mail being shipped by rail on the Northwestern Pacific. Nashmead was the site of a suspension bridge across the Eel River for foot traffic, unique for having only a single tower to support the cables. The bridge was constructed in 1939 and was the only means for residents of the nearby Round Valley Indian Reservation to obtain supplies shipped by rail.

A post office operated at Nashmead from 1915 to 1960. The name honors J. Nash, its first postmaster. The name Nashmead was formed from "Nash's Meadows".
