= Newtown, Iffa and Offa East =

Townland in County Tipperary, Ireland

Newtown, (Irish: An Baile Nua) is a townland in the Barony of Iffa and Offa East in County Tipperary, Ireland. It is in the civil parish of Killaloan and is one of nineteen townlands known as Newtown in County Tipperary.
