= Riverview, San Bernardino =

- Neighborhood community
- Nicknames: North Loma Linda, Old Riverside
- Location of the Riverview, San Bernardino in California
- Coordinates: 34°10′44″N 117°19′37″W
- Country: United States
- State: California
- County: San Bernardino
- City: San Bernardino
- Elevation: 1,165 ft (355 m)

Population (2024)
  - Total: 5,540
- Time zone: UTC-8 (PST)
  - Summer (DST): UTC-7 (PDT)

Riverview, also known as North Loma Linda, is a neighborhood in the city of San Bernardino, California. The urban neighborhood has a population of 5,540 and is bounded on the west by Tippecanoe Avenue; on the east by Mountain Avenue; on the south by the 10 freeway;and on the north by the Santa Ana River. Riverview borders the Hospitality Lane District sharing its main commercial street, Tippecanoe Avenue and lies in the city's 3rd ward.

== Education ==
Riverview is home to one school, Victoria Elementary School. The school is located within the Redlands Unified School District and most students in the neighborhood fall within the boundaries of the Redlands USD, unlike the majority of other San Bernardino neighborhoods which are serviced by the San Bernardino City Unified School District.

== Transportation ==
Riverview is adjacent to I-10 to the south, off the Tippecanoe Avenue/Anderson Street exit. Like the rest of the San Bernardino Valley, the neighborhood is serviced by the Omnitrans bus service. The sbX green line has a station near Riverview at Tiippecanoe and Hospitality Lane. Additionally, Metrolink's Arrow has a train station on the border with the Hospitality Lane District at Tippecanoe Avenue. The San Bernardino International Airport is located just north of the neighborhood's boundary.

== See also ==
- San Bernardino, California
