= New City =

New City may refer to:

== Places ==
- New City, Chicago, a neighborhood of Chicago
- New City, Illinois
- New City, Massachusetts, former name of Hudson, Massachusetts
- New City, New York
- New City, Wisconsin, a ghost town
- New City, Tijuana, a high-rise residential development in Tijuana
- a form of subdivision of Egypt

== Arts and entertainment ==
- New City (band), a band based in Toronto, Ontario, Canada
- New City (album), a 1975 album by Blood, Sweat & Tears
- Newcity, an alternative weekly in Chicago

== See also ==
- List of planned cities
- Model Cities Program
