= Newton, Wisconsin =

Newton is the name of some places in the U.S. state of Wisconsin:

- Newton, Manitowoc County, Wisconsin, a town
  - Newton (community), Manitowoc County, Wisconsin, an unincorporated community
  - Newtonburg, Wisconsin, an unincorporated community
- Newton, Marquette County, Wisconsin, a town
- Newton, Vernon County, Wisconsin, an unincorporated community
