= North Dinuba, California =

Unincorporated community in California, United States

- Unincorporated community
- Location within California Location within the United States
- Coordinates: 36°34′03″N 119°23′40″W
- Country: United States
- State: California
- County: Tulare
- Elevation: 344 ft (105 m)
- Time zone: UTC-8 (Pacific (PST))
  - Summer (DST): UTC-7 (PDT)
- Area code: 559
- GNIS feature ID: 1659247

North Dinuba is an unincorporated community in Tulare County, California, United States. North Dinuba is 1.7 miles (2.7 km) north of downtown Dinuba. It is served by Washington Intermediate School and John F. Kennedy Elementary.
