= Newville =

Newville may refer to:

== Places ==
Canada

- Newville, Newfoundland and Labrador

United States

- Newville, Alabama
- Newville, California
- Newville, Indiana
- Newville, New York
- Newville, Ohio
- Newville, Pennsylvania
- Newville, Bucks County, Pennsylvania
- Newville, West Virginia
- Newville, Wisconsin
- Newville Township, DeKalb County, Indiana

== People with the surname ==
- Joshua A. Newville (born 1984), American lawyer

== Lakes ==
- Newville Lake, Canada
