= New Auberry, California =

Unincorporated community in California, United States

New Auberry
- Unincorporated community
- Location in California New Auberry (the United States)
- Coordinates: 37°05′36″N 119°29′49″W
- Country: United States
- State: California
- County: Fresno
- Elevation: 2,064 ft (629 m)

New Auberry (also Auberry) is an unincorporated community in Fresno County, California, United States. It is located 10 miles (16 km) west of Shaver Lake Heights, at an elevation of 2064 feet (629 m).
