= Navelencia, California =

Unincorporated community in California, United States

Navelencia
- Unincorporated community
- Location in California Navelencia (the United States)
- Coordinates: 36°41′00″N 119°23′08″W
- Country: United States
- State: California
- County: Fresno
- Elevation: 420 ft (128 m)

Navelencia is an unincorporated community in Fresno County, California, United States. It is located 7 miles (11 km) east-southeast of Centerville, at an elevation of 420 feet (128 m). The farmland surrounding Navelencia supports orchards of oranges and other citrus trees. The township's name is a portmanteau of two varieties of oranges: navel and valencia. This orange-themed naming is shared with the neighboring city, Orange Cove.

A post office operated at Navelencia from 1915 to 1931.
