= Railroad Hotel =

- U.S. National Register of Historic Places
- U.S. Historic district – Contributing property
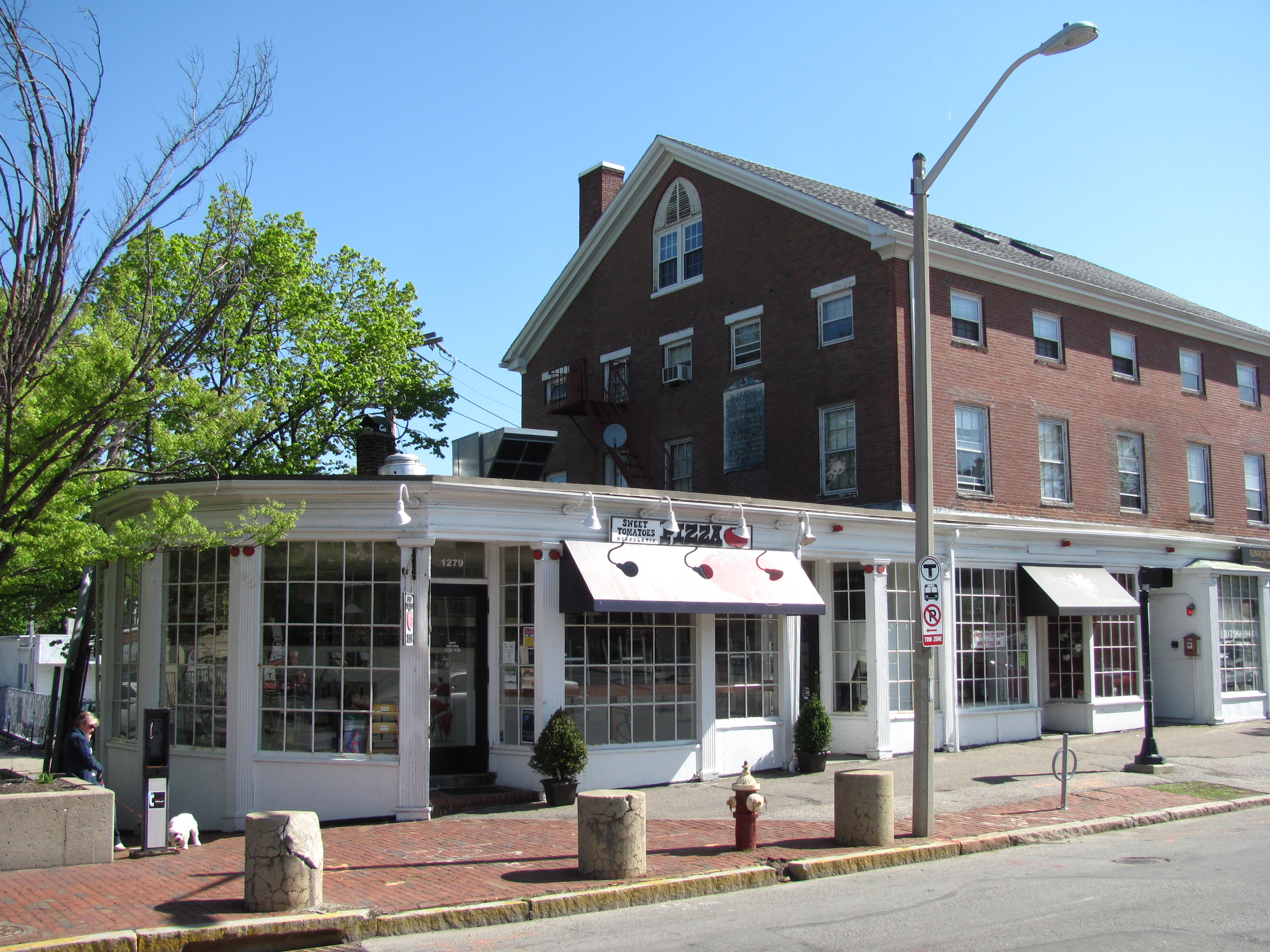
- 2011

- Location within Massachusetts Location within the United States
- Location: 1273–1279 Washington Street; West Newton, Massachusetts
- Coordinates: 42°20′58.4″N 71°13′31.3″W
- Built: 1831
- Architectural style: Greek Revival, Federal
- Part of: West Newton Village Center Historic District (ID90000017)
- MPS: Newton MRA
- NRHP reference No.: 86001868

Significant dates
- Added to NRHP: September 4, 1986
- Designated CP: March 16, 1990

The Railroad Hotel (Seth Davis Tavern) is a building that served as a historic hotel at the triangular lot where Washington Street joins Watertown Street (Route 16) in the West Newton section of Newton, Massachusetts. Built in 1831, it is the only early building still standing in West Newton's village center. The Railroad Hotel is on the National Register of Historic Places and is a contributing property to the West Newton Village Center Historic District.

== History ==
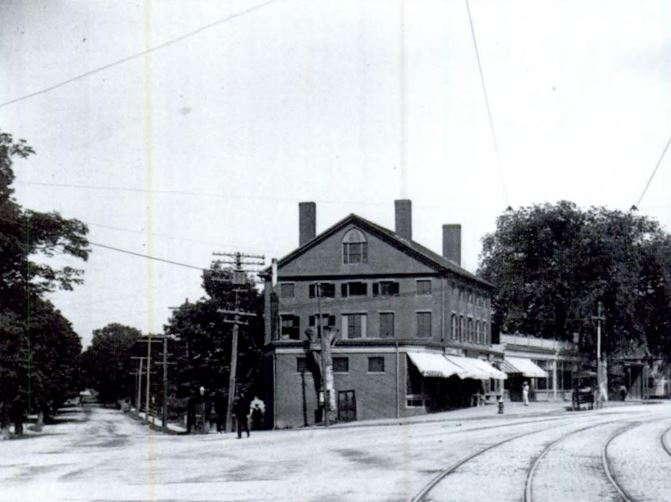
The Railroad Hotel in the 1890s

The hotel was built in 1831 in a Greek Revival/Federal style by Seth Davis to serve at first as a lodging stop along a stagecoach line that ran from Boston to Worcester. Mr Davis was a teacher, an entrepreneur and a developer who had a big influence on the early community of West Newton. The Seth Davis House. Located nearby on Eden Avenue, is also on the National Register.

When the Boston and Worcester Railroad reached West Newton in April 1834, the hotel served as the line's first terminal, and as a transfer point to stagecoaches until the railroad was extended to Worcester the next year. It was known as the Railroad Hotel and Terminal Hotel thereafter, even after the B&W built a dedicated station nearby.

It was added to the National Register of Historic Places in 1986. The building currently houses retail shops and no longer serves as a hotel. It is the only early building still standing in West Newton's village center.

== See also ==
- National Register of Historic Places listings in Newton, Massachusetts
