= Nichols, California =

Unincorporated community in California, United States

Nichols
- Unincorporated community
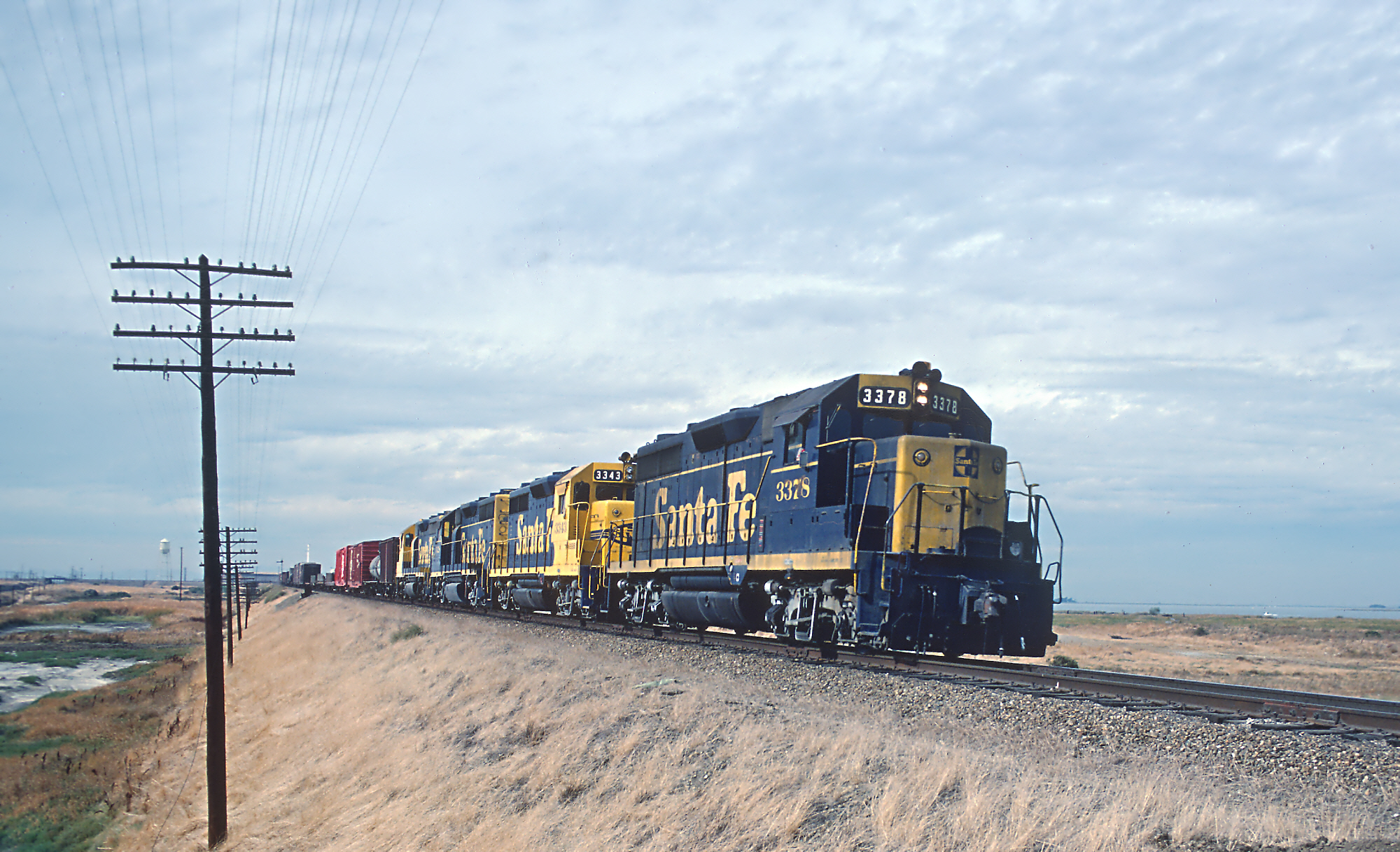
- A freight train in Nichols in 1980

- Location in California
- Coordinates: 38°02′29″N 121°59′17″W
- Country: United States
- State: California
- County: Contra Costa
- Elevation: 62 ft (19 m)
- GNIS ID: 1659765
- FIPS code: 06-51322

Nichols is an unincorporated community in Contra Costa County, California, United States. It is on the Atchison, Topeka and Santa Fe Railroad, 5.5 miles (9 km) west of Pittsburg, at an elevation of 62 feet (19 m). The place is named for William H. Nichols, president of the General Chemical Company of New York, which built in 1909 a plant here to produce fertilizer and a number of other chemicals for industrial use. In 1921, General Chemical became a division of Nichols's Allied Chemical, later Allied Corporation.
