= Newtown, Kilnamanagh Upper =

There are two townlands with the name Newtown, (Irish: An Baile Nua) in the Barony of Kilnamanagh Upper in County Tipperary, Ireland.

- Newtown in the civil parish of Ballycahill
- Newtown in the civil parish of Templebeg

There are nineteen townlands known as Newtown in the whole of County Tipperary.
