= Newtown, Owney and Arra =

There are two townlands with the name Newtown, (Irish: An Baile Nua) in the Barony of Owney and Arra in County Tipperary, Ireland.

- Newtown in the civil parish of Youghalarra
- Newtown in the civil parish of Templeachally

There are nineteen townlands known as Newtown in the whole of County Tipperary.
