= Newyears Green =

Coordinates: 51.58060074°N 0.46005281°W

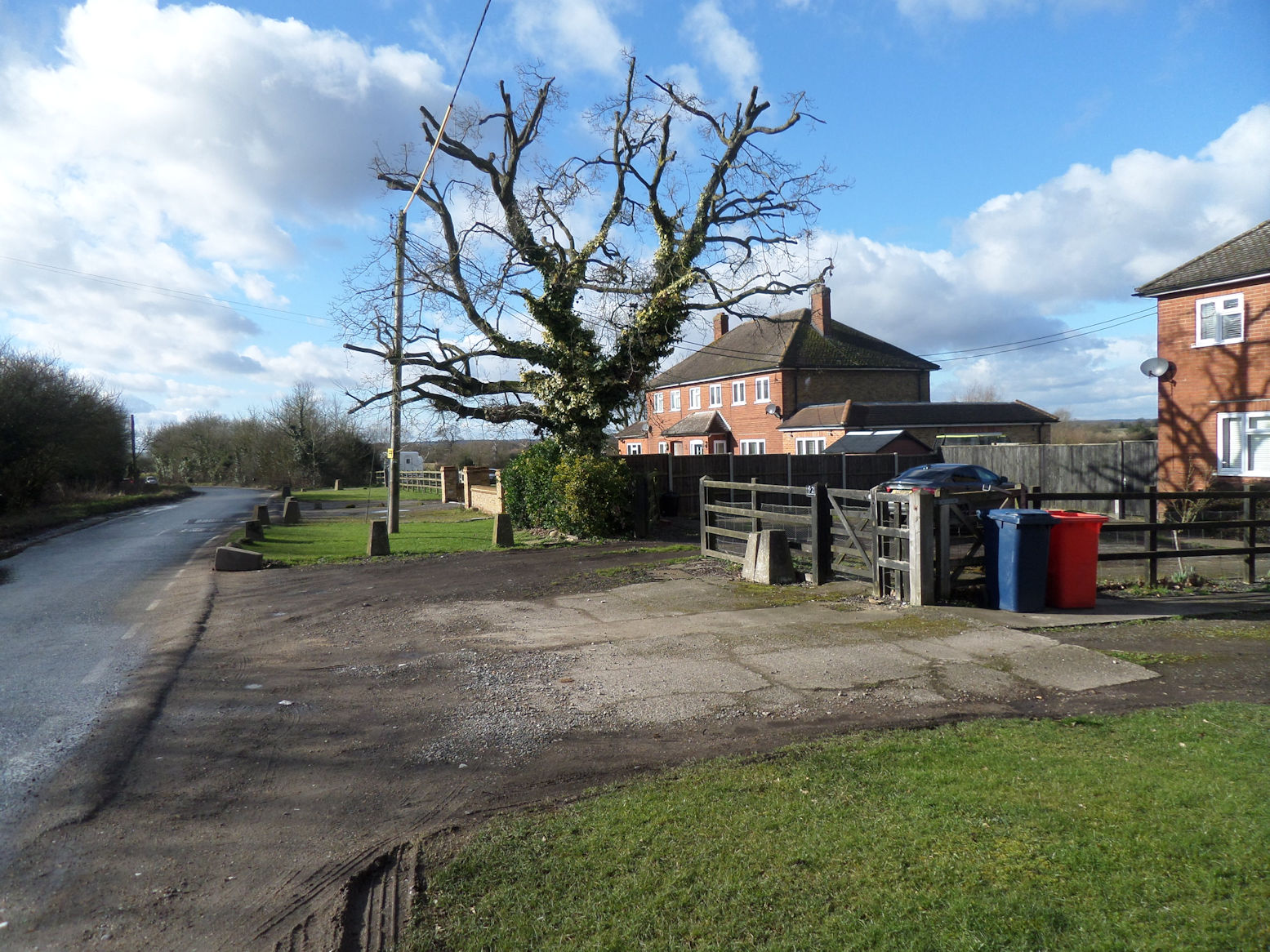
- Cottages in Newyears Green

- Location within Greater London
- OS grid reference: TQ068879
  - Charing Cross: 16.6 mi (26.7 km) SE
- London borough: Hillingdon
- Ceremonial county: Greater London
- Region: London
- Country: England
- Sovereign state: United Kingdom
- Post town: Uxbridge
- Postcode district: UB9
- Dialling code: 01895
- Police: Metropolitan
- Fire: London
- Ambulance: London
- UK Parliament: Ruislip, Northwood and Pinner
- London Assembly: Ealing and Hillingdon

Newyears Green is a hamlet of the London Borough of Hillingdon in London, England. It lies 16.6 miles (26.7 kilometers) northwest of Charing Cross.

It is situated south of Harefield, west of Ruislip and north of Ickenham, in Greater London. The etymology behind the name of the town is unknown.
