= Newtown, Kilnamanagh Lower =

Townland in County Tipperary, Ireland

Newtown, (Irish: An Baile Nua) is a townland in the Barony of Kilnamanagh Lower in County Tipperary, Ireland. It is in the civil parish of Aghacrew and is one of nineteen townlands known as Newtown in County Tipperary.
