= Newton Corner station =

Transit hub in Newton, Massachusetts, US

Newton Corner
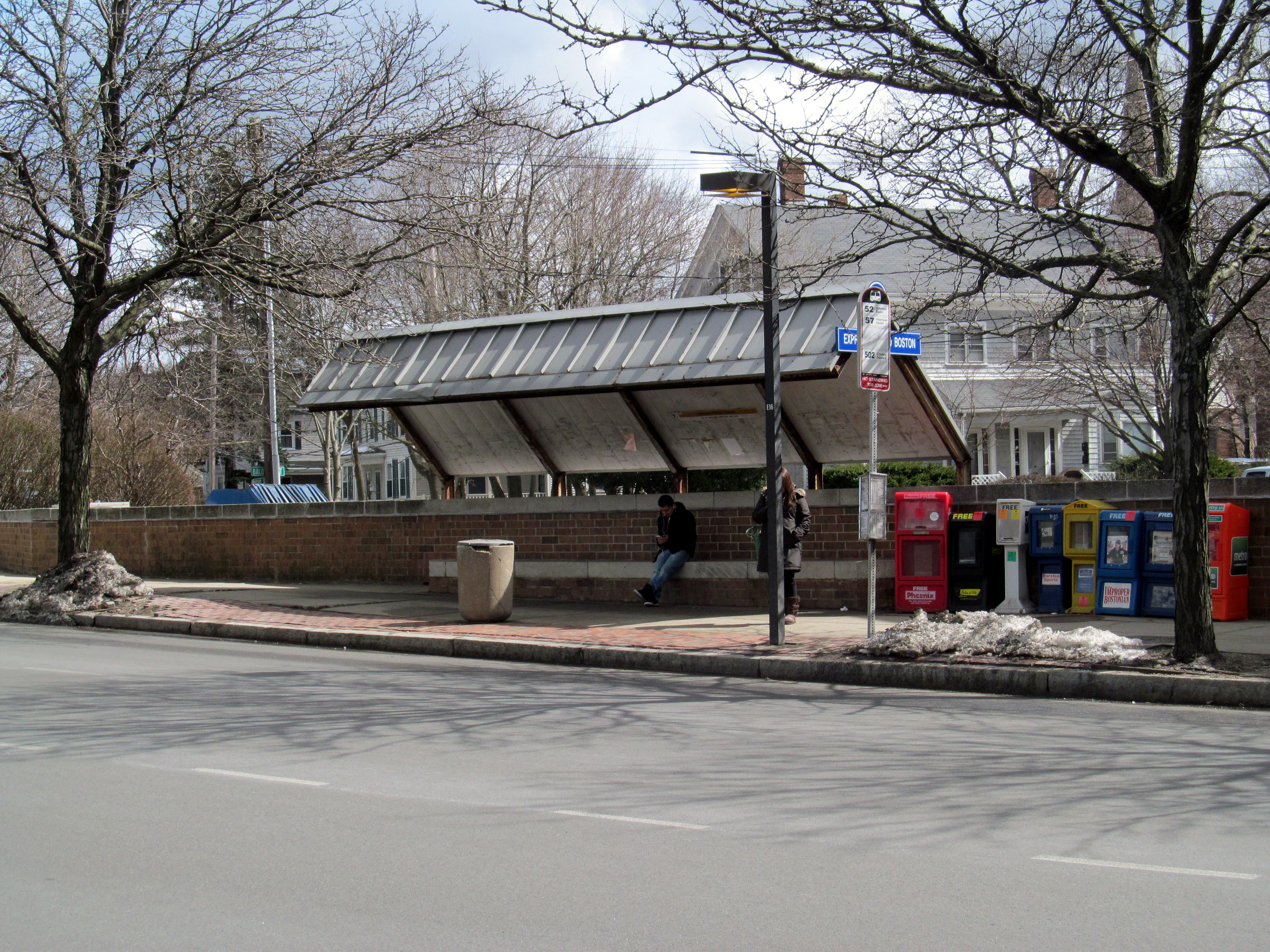
- The south bus shelter at Newton Corner in 2013

General information
- Location: Washington Street at Centre Street; Newton Corner, Newton, Massachusetts
- Coordinates: 42.35756°N 71.18441°W
- Connections: MBTA bus: 52, 57, 501, 504, 553, 554, 556, 558

History
- Opened: c. 1834 (commuter rail); 1863 (streetcars)
- Closed: April 1959 (commuter rail); June 21, 1969 (Green Line)

Former services
Preceding station	MBTA	Following station
Watertown via local stops Terminus	Green Line A branch	Oak Square via local stops toward Park Street
Preceding station	New York Central Railroad	Following station
Newtonville toward Worcester	Worcester Line Closed 1959	Faneuil toward Boston
Location

Newton Corner is an MBTA bus transfer point in the Newton Corner neighborhood of Newton, Massachusetts, located on the rotary where Washington Street crosses the Massachusetts Turnpike. The Newton Corner station, known simply as Newton for much of its lifetime, served commuters on the Worcester Line (run by the New York Central Railroad and its predecessors) from 1834 to 1959. A streetcar stop, located on the surface streets, served a number of routes beginning in 1863, including the Green Line A branch until 1969. Newton Corner is now a stop and transfer point for MBTA routes 52, 57, 501, 504, 553, 554, 556, and 558, which include express routes to downtown Boston as well as local routes, with stops on the north and south sides of the rotary.

== History ==
=== Commuter rail ===
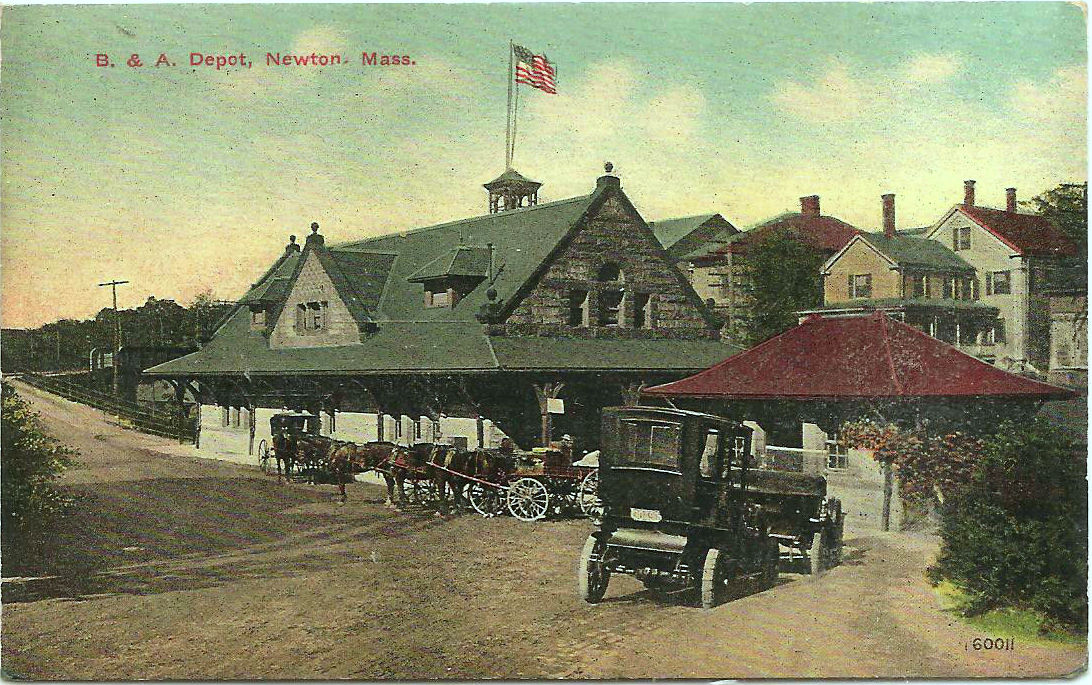
Postcard of the 1880s-built station

The Boston and Worcester Railroad opened the segment from downtown Boston to West Newton on April 7, 1834, with a station called Newton Corner opening then or soon after in the Angier's Corner neighborhood. The station was located on the south side of the tracks west of Centre Street. A second track was added in 1839, and in 1843 the railroad began offering season fares for around $60, making it one of the first commuter rail systems. Newton Corner was among the most popular stations, with ridership of 26,000 in 1866.

A village petition around 1870 resulted in the station being renamed as simply Newton. Third and fourth tracks through the station were built in 1884. Around this time, a new station building was built in the Richardsonian Romanesque style. The Boston and Worcester became part of the Boston and Albany Railroad in 1867, which itself was leased by the New York Central Railroad in 1900.

The Massachusetts Turnpike was extended from Route 128 in Weston to I-93 in downtown Boston. The highway occupied a significant portion of the right-of-way, dropping the Worcester Line from 4 to 2 tracks from Back Bay to Riverside. Newton and the local stops in Boston were closed and demolished; station buildings further west in Newton were removed, but service to those stops continued.

=== Streetcars ===
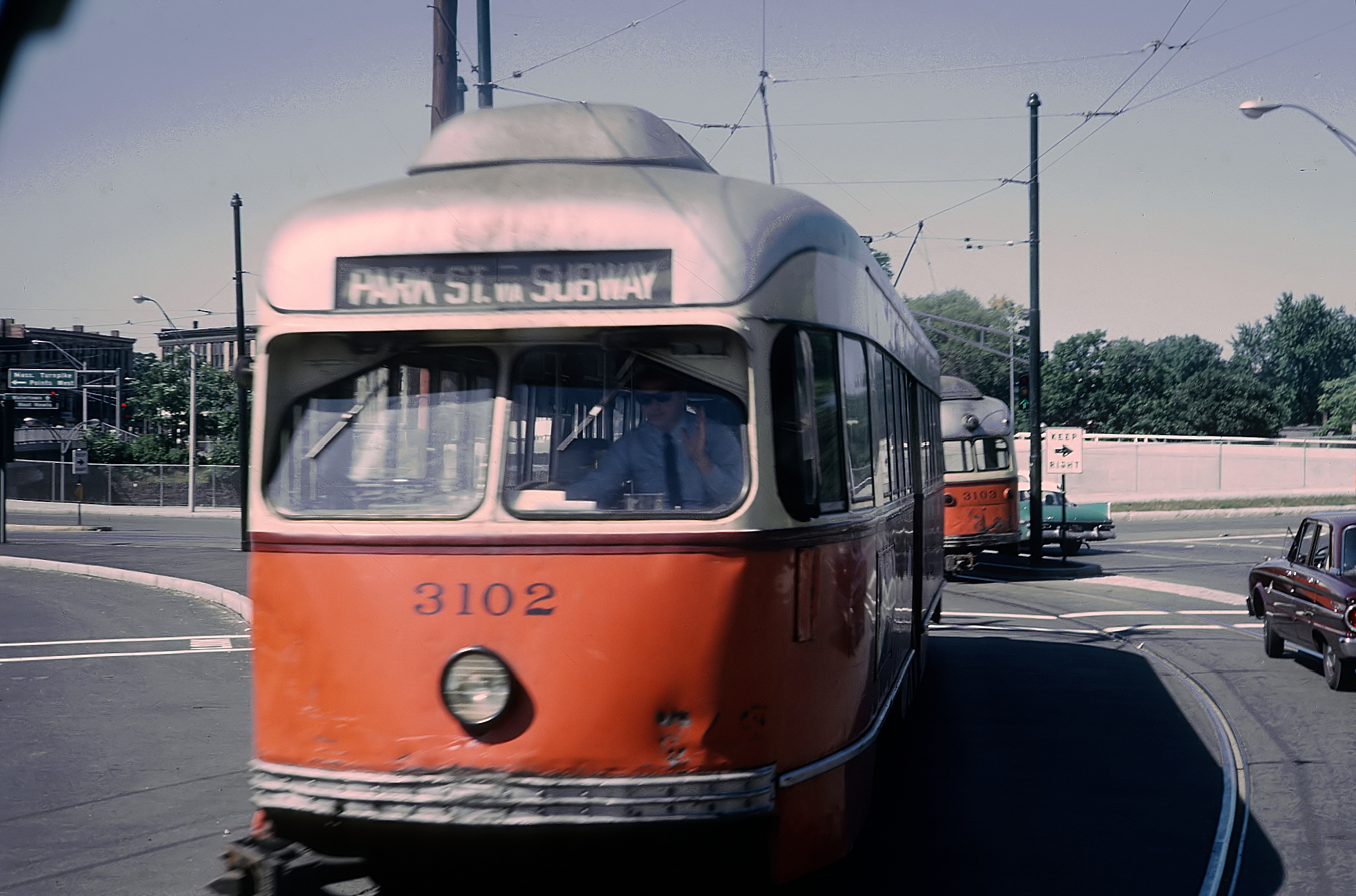
A branch streetcars just south of the rotary in 1965

The Cambridge Railroad extended its Central Square–Oak Square horsecar line to Nonantum Square (Newton Corner) in 1863, though it was cut back to Oak Square in 1871. In 1881, the company extended its Harvard Square–Watertown line to Nonantum Square. That line began using electric streetcars on December 13, 1893. The Cambridge Railroad merged in 1887 into the West End Street Railway, which in turn was leased by the Boston Elevated Railway (BERy) in 1897. On June 13, 1896, the West End opened trackage on Commonwealth Avenue and Brighton Avenue, providing a electrified route between Oak Square and downtown more direct than the previous route through Cambridge. At the same time, the line was extended to just short of Newton Corner.

The line began running to Park Street in the new Tremont Street Subway on November 8, 1897. On May 21, 1898, the line was extended to Nonantum Square. On December 9, 1912, the transfer point between the Harvard and Oak Square lines was changed from Nonantum Square to Watertown Yard. This completed the Watertown Line from Park Street to Watertown Yard - its route for the next half-century. In the 1920s, a concrete boarding island was built in the square. The BERy was replaced by the Metropolitan Transit Authority (MTA) in 1947.

The Newton Street Railway opened an extension of its Waltham–West Newton streetcar line to Nonantum Square in 1890. The square soon became a transfer point between the Newton Street Railway's expanding suburban system and service into Cambridge and Boston. The Newton Square Railway was merged into the Middlesex and Boston Street Railway (M&B) in 1909. The M&B operated through services from Newton Corner as far west as Framingham. These routes were replaced by buses in the 1920s; the final M&B streetcar route to Newton Corner was the Framingham route, which was converted to buses in September 1929.

The Massachusetts Bay Transportation Authority (MBTA) took over MTA transit service in 1964. That year, the exit 17 rotary was constructed at Newton Corner. Expecting little traffic at the intersection, the streetcar tracks were placed in a contraflow lane, while the platforms were moved to the north side of the rotary in a dedicated median. However, the rotary proved to be busy and congested, resulting in frequent delays and automobile-streetcar collisions. In 1967, the route 69 streetcar line was renamed as the Green Line A branch. After a series of temporary bustitutions during the 1960s, the A branch was again "temporarily" substituted on June 21, 1969. However, the replacement route 57 bus became permanent and the trolleys never returned. The trackage was intact for non-revenue moves to Watertown Carhouse until 1994.

=== Bus service ===
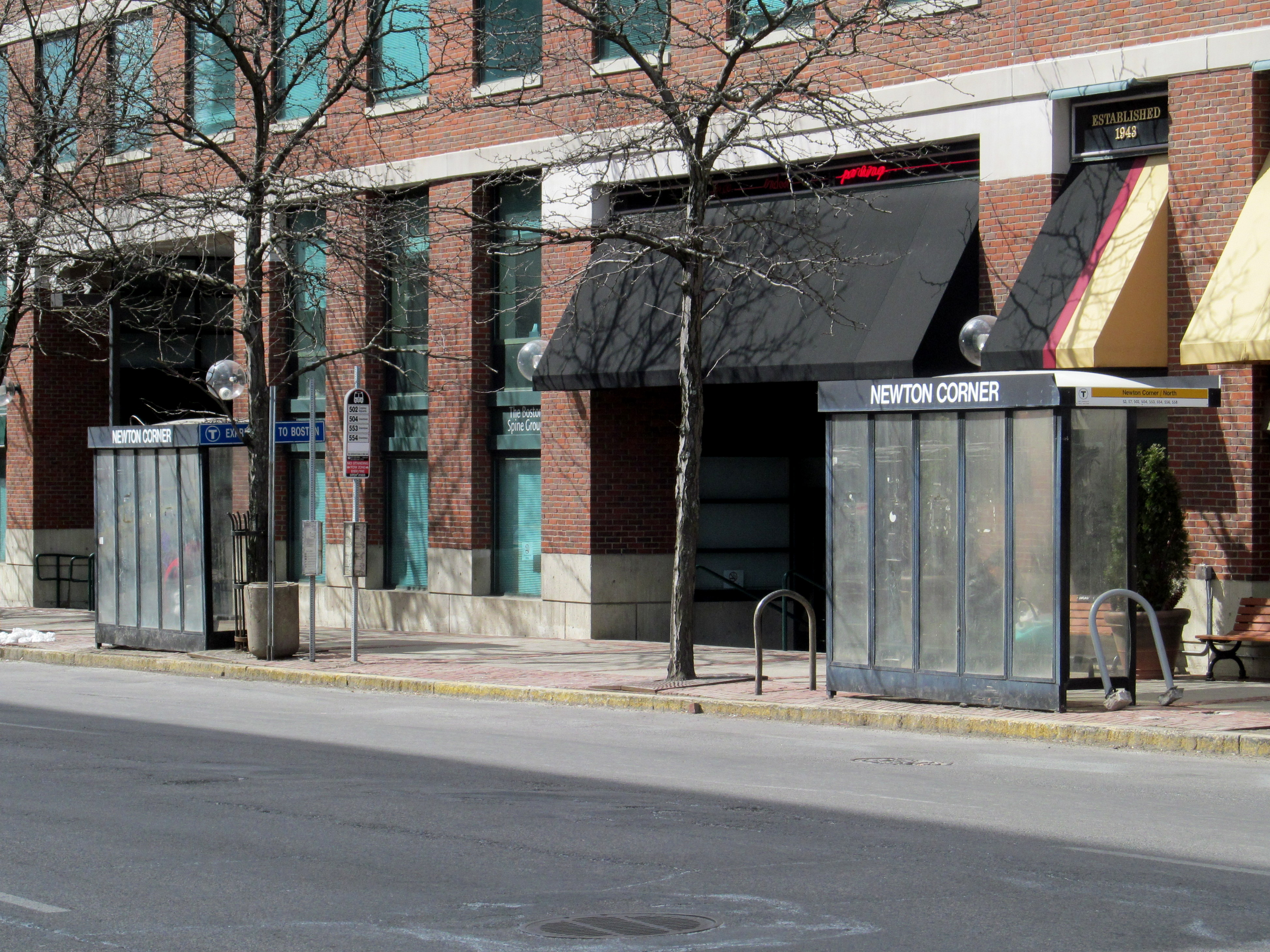
The north bus stop in 2013

Although no longer served by rail transport, Newton Corner remained a transfer point for bus routes. In 1967, the MBTA began operating express bus routes from Watertown Yard and Oak Square (later extended to Brighton Center) to downtown Boston. A Watertown–Copley Square express route was added in 1968; the three routes were renumbered 504, 501, and 502 in 1970. In 1972, the MBTA took over remaining M&B bus service, including six routes that terminated at Newton Corner. The Framingham–Newton Corner route was extended to Boston in 1974, but discontinued in 1981. In 1983, four routes running between Waltham points and Newton Corner were extended to Boston. These routes were renumbered into the 550 series in 1996, while the 300-series routes were renumbered in the 500s.

When proposals to reactivate the A branch were considered in the 1970s and 1980s, a likely possibility was that the streetcars would only return as far as Oak Square, with trolleybuses filling the gap between Watertown and Oak Square. The City of Newton did not approve of overhead lines, however, and the proposals never came to fruition. However, a limited version of the proposal was considered wherein the route 71 trolleybus would be extended from Watertown to Newton Corner. In the 2004 Program for Mass Transportation, the $1.5 million project was estimated to add 600 new daily transit riders but was given low priority compared to other bus expansion projects.

The combination of local routes (the 57 and the ex-M&B 52) and express routes has kept Newton Corner a significant transfer point. In 2006, over 60 buses traversed the rotary hourly during the morning peak. Stops are located on both the north and south side of the rotary. While this allows passengers to avoid crossing the bus rotary on foot, it caused some routes to loop the rotary just to serve both stops. The 550-series routes formerly looped one-and-one-half times around the rotary before re-entering the Turnpike.

On September 1, 2019, outbound route 502 and 504 buses began turning directly onto Galen Street rather than serving the Newton Corner rotary stops; outbound route 501 and 503 buses began serving the rotary stops at that time. Most MBTA service began operating on Saturday schedules on March 17, 2020, due to the COVID-19 pandemic. Weekday-only routes 502, 503, 554, 556, and 558 were suspended (along with route 501 in June), while Newton Corner became the east terminal for route 553 except evenings. Routes 501, 554, 556, and 558 resumed on August 31, 2020, with Newton Corner the east terminal for the 550-series routes; evening route 553 service was similarly cut back that December. The MBTA's November 2022 bus network redesign plan calls for Newton Corner to no longer be a terminal though it would continue to see frequent bus service. Routes 501 and 504 would continue operating, routes 502 and 503 would not resume operation, routes 556 and 558 would become local routes (56 and 58) running to Watertown Yard via Newton Corner, and routes 553 and 554 would become local routes that no longer serve Newton Corner.
