= Newtown, Greene County, Virginia =

Unincorporated community in Virginia, US

Coordinates: 38°14′15″N 78°20′14″W

Newtown is an unincorporated community in Greene County, Virginia, United States.
