= Newton Township =

Newton Township may refer to:

== Arkansas ==
- Newton Township Faulkner County, Arkansas, in Faulkner County, Arkansas

== Illinois ==
- Newton Township, Whiteside County, Illinois

== Indiana ==
- Newton Township, Jasper County, Indiana

== Iowa ==
- Newton Township, Buchanan County, Iowa
- Newton Township, Carroll County, Iowa
- Newton Township, Jasper County, Iowa
- Newton Township, Winnebago County, Iowa

== Kansas ==
- Newton Township, Harvey County, Kansas

== Michigan ==
- Newton Township, Calhoun County, Michigan
- Newton Township, Mackinac County, Michigan

== Minnesota ==
- Newton Township, Otter Tail County, Minnesota

== Missouri ==
- Newton Township, Shannon County, Missouri

== New Jersey ==
- Newton Township, Camden County, New Jersey
- Newton Township, Sussex County, New Jersey

== North Carolina ==
- Newton Township, Catawba County, North Carolina, in Catawba County, North Carolina

== Ohio ==
- Newton Township, Licking County, Ohio
- Newton Township, Miami County, Ohio
- Newton Township, Muskingum County, Ohio
- Newton Township, Pike County, Ohio
- Newton Township, Trumbull County, Ohio

== Pennsylvania ==
- Newton Township, Lackawanna County, Pennsylvania

== See also ==
- Newtown Township (disambiguation)
