= Newtown-in-St Martin =

Hamlet in Cornwall, England

Coordinates: 50°03′53″N 5°09′23″W

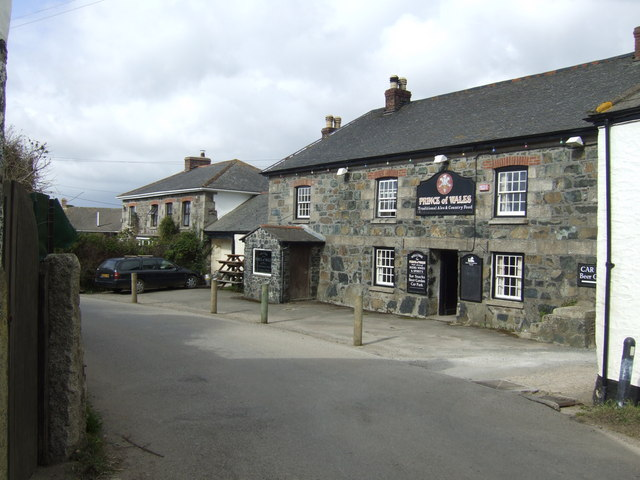
The Prince of Wales public house

Newtown-in-St Martin is a hamlet in the parish of St Martin-in-Meneage, Cornwall, England. Newtown is south-southeast of St Martin's Green.
