= Newtown, Staffordshire =

Area of Essington in Staffordshire, England

Coordinates: 52.639°N 2.012°W

Newtown
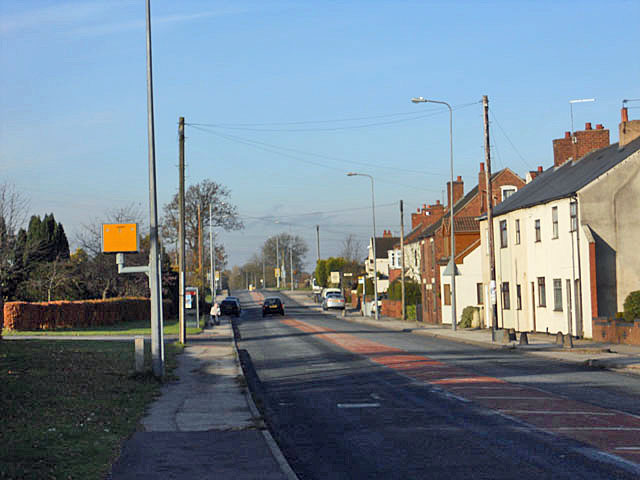
- Newtown, Essington

- Location within Staffordshire
- OS grid reference: SJ988048
- Civil parish: Essington
- District: South Staffordshire
- Shire county: Staffordshire
- Region: West Midlands
- Country: England
- Sovereign state: United Kingdom
- Post town: Walsall
- Postcode district: WS6
- Dialling code: 01922
- Police: Staffordshire
- Fire: Staffordshire
- Ambulance: West Midlands
- UK Parliament: South Staffordshire

Newtown is an area of the civil parish of Essington in the South Staffordshire district of Staffordshire, England.

Newtown lies between Landywood, Great Wyrley and Bloxwich. The village lies on Walsall Road, the main route between Walsall and Cannock, which forms part of the A34.
