= Newtown, Nevada County, California =

Unincorporated community in California, United States

Newtown
- Unincorporated community
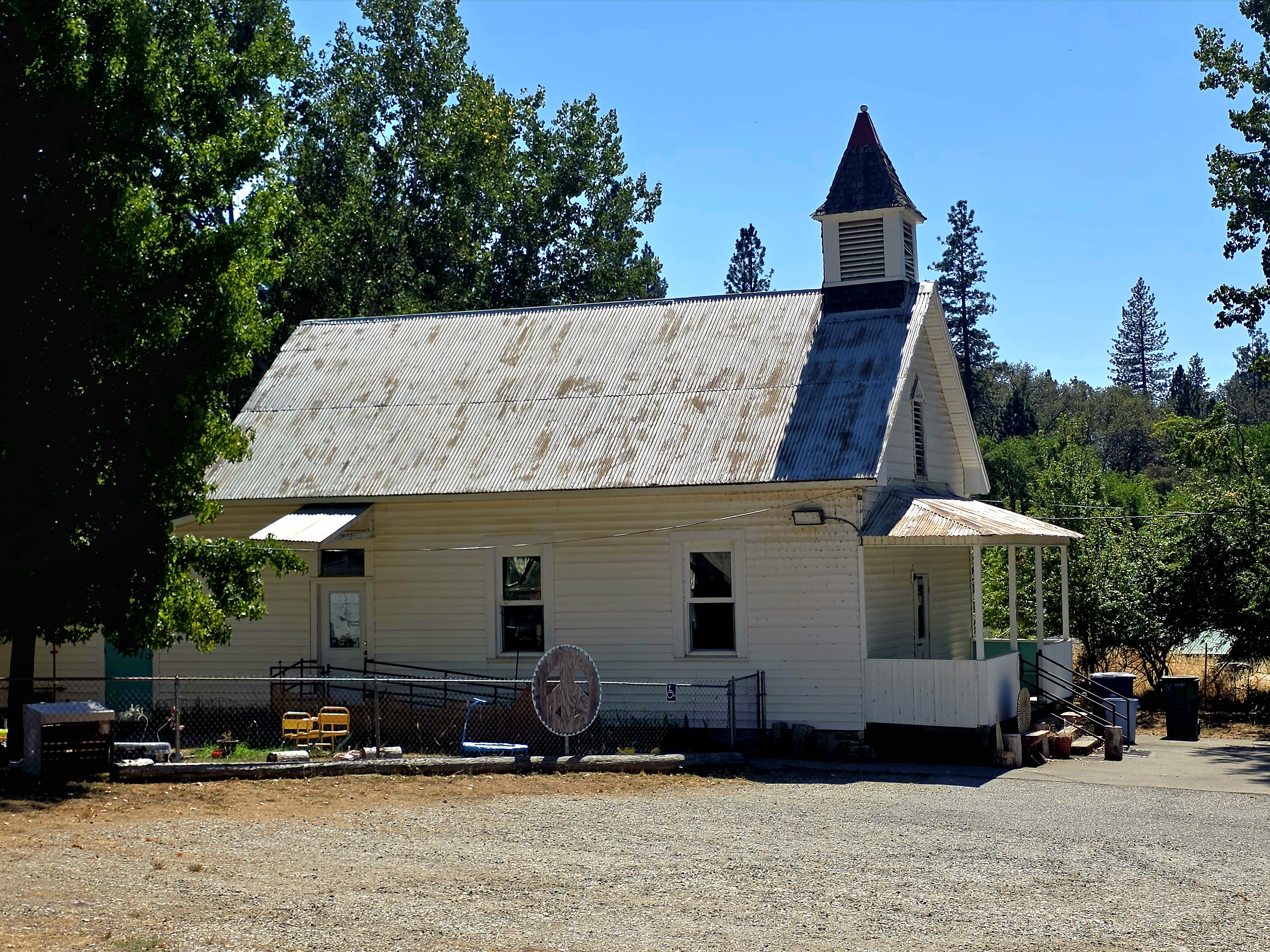
- The Kentucky Flat School has been in Newtown since 1855

- Location in California Newtown (the United States)
- Coordinates: 39°15′10″N 121°06′12″W
- Country: United States
- State: California
- County: Nevada County
- Elevation: 2,113 ft (644 m)

Newtown (formerly, Sailor Flat, Newton and Sailors Flat) is a former California Gold Rush settlement in Nevada County, California. It lies at an elevation of 2113 feet (644 m). Newtown is located 4.5 miles (7.2 km) west of Nevada City.

Newtown was settled in 1850, but never grew very large; its 1855 population was 53. The Newtown area later became a farming district, particularly for the cultivation of pears.
