= Newtown, Exeter =

Area of Exeter, Devon, England

Coordinates: 50.728°N 3.505°W

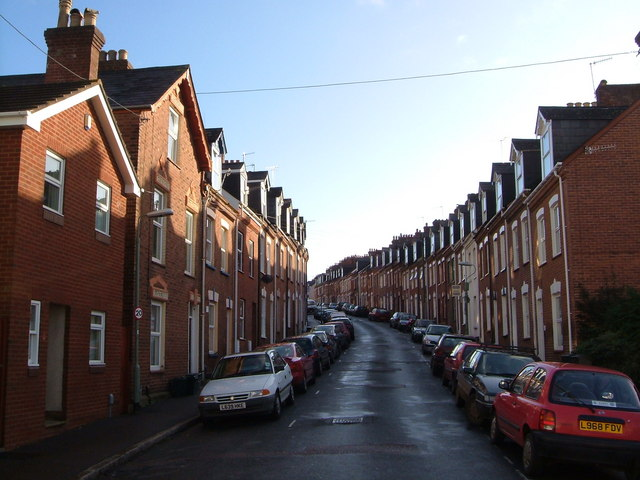
Portland Street, Newtown

Newtown is an area of Exeter between St Sidwells and Heavitree. It was traditionally an area for the poor since Saxon times. A workhouse was built in 1671 on a site currently used as a car park, but Newtown remained largely rural up until the 19th century. Around 1700 a new workhouse was built on what is now the site of Heavitree Hospital.

Brick and tile making were carried on in Exeter by the Romans from clay workings within the city wall. By the 16th century, the rich red clay of Newtown was exploited for brick making, the main brickworks being sited in the location of what is currently the dry ski-slope and golf driving range.

Due to the Cholera epidemics of the 1830s the open sewer that ran along the bottom of the hill was covered over, to create Clifton Road. In the mid-19th century four streets of small terraced houses were built to house manual workers, labourers and their families. In the 1880s St Matthew's Church was built.

In May 1942 Exeter was heavily bombed in the Baedeker raids of the Second World War. Newtown was badly affected with many buildings destroyed, including the lower section of Newtown School. Post war development saw the creation of the Inner By-pass (Western Way) which cut through the northern part of Newtown, while regeneration work in the late 1960s saw new developments of blocks of flats, some of which were placed to 'disrupt' the uniform Victorian street pattern.
