= West Newton station =

West Newton
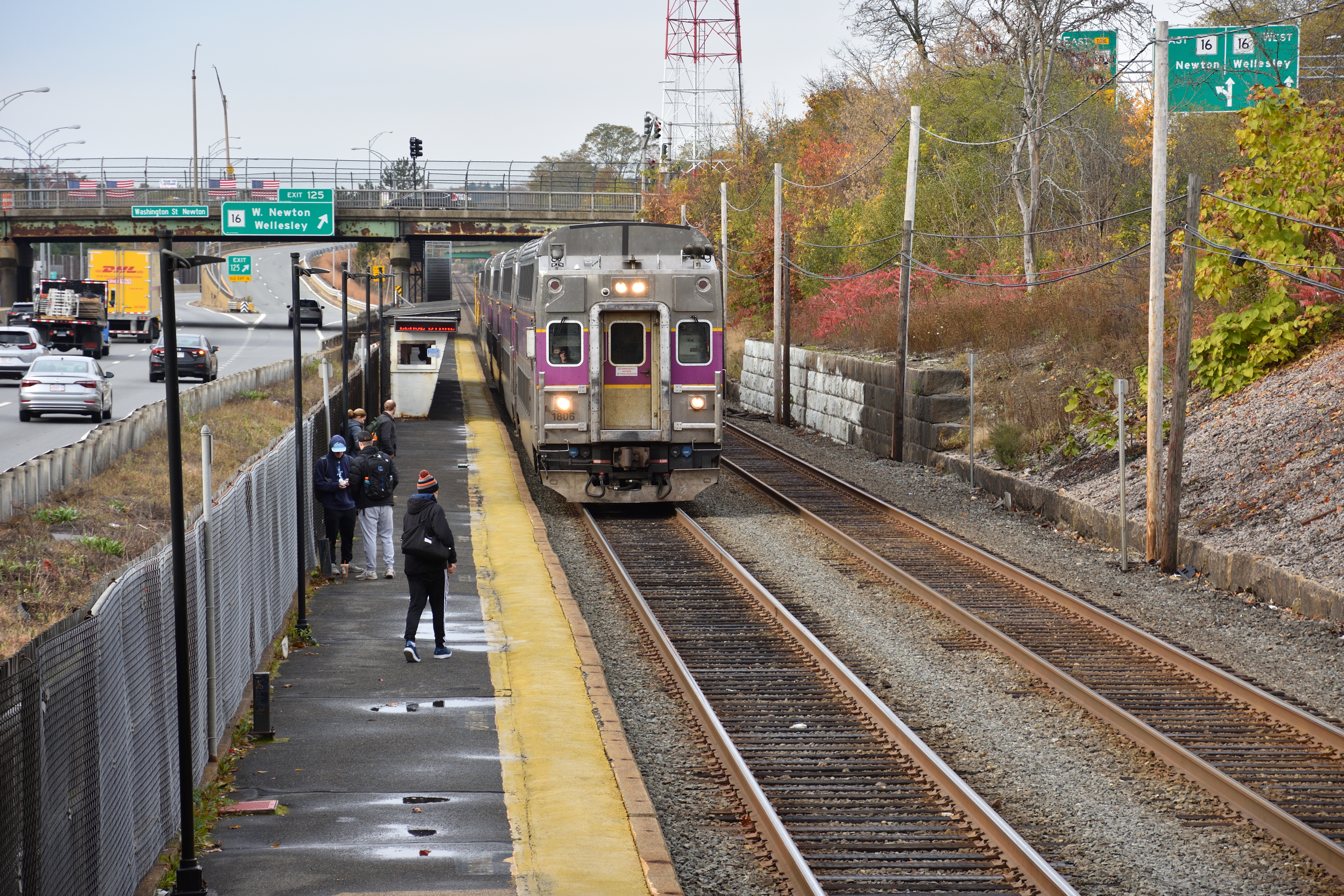
- An inbound train at West Newton station in 2023

General information
- Location: 1395 Washington Street; Newton, Massachusetts
- Coordinates: 42.34780°N 71.23075°W
- Line: Worcester Main Line
- Platforms: 1 side platform
- Tracks: 2
- Connections: MBTA bus: 553, 554

Construction
- Parking: 206 spaces
- Accessible: No

Other information
- Fare zone: 2

History
- Opened: 1834

Passengers
- 2024: 227 daily boardings

Services
| Preceding station | MBTA | Following station |
|---|---|---|
| Auburndale toward Worcester | Framingham/Worcester Line | Newtonville toward South Station |
Former services
| Preceding station | New York Central Railroad | Following station |
|---|---|---|
| Auburndale toward Albany | Boston and Albany Railroad Main Line | Newtonville toward Boston |
Location

West Newton station is an MBTA Commuter Rail station in Newton, Massachusetts. It serves the Framingham/Worcester Line, and is located inside the Massachusetts Turnpike Exit 16 rotary in the village of West Newton. West Newton has had continuous rail service since 1834. The station consists of a single low side platform serving one of the line's two tracks, with small crossings to access trains on the far track. West Newton is not accessible; a renovation for accessibility is planned.

== History ==
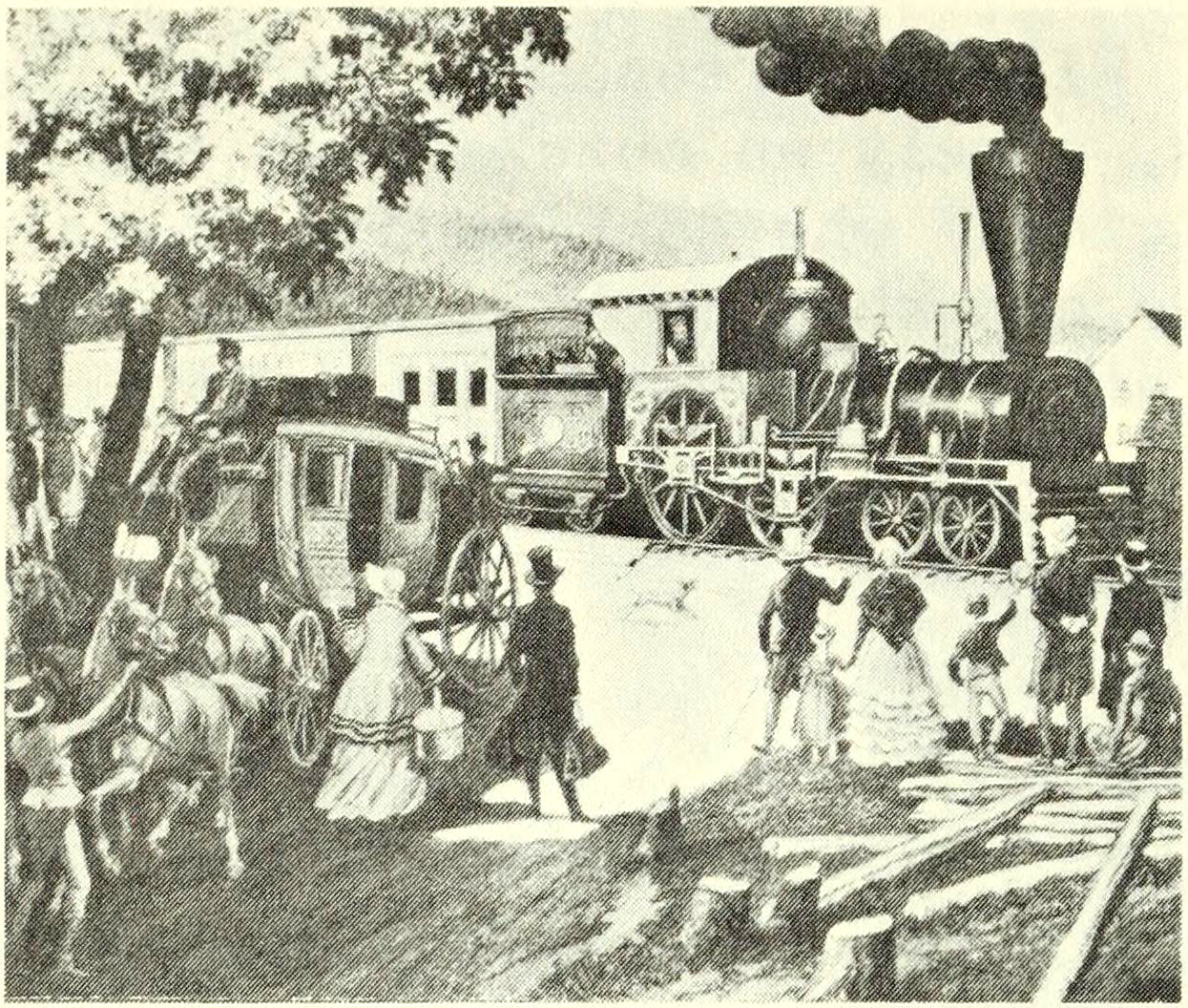
A stagecoach and train at West Newton in 1834

West Newton was the first terminus of the Boston and Worcester Railroad in April 1834, and one of the first locations in the world from which workers could commute to a city by rail for regular working hours. The Railroad Hotel originally served as the train station. By the late 1840s, a dedicated station building was located on the north side of the tracks just west of Chestnut Street. A new station building was constructed in 1850 at an expense of $2,700. It was located on the south side of the tracks.

Service to West Newton and Auburndale stations was reduced to one daily round trip on January 30, 1981, as part of a series of service cuts due to a budget crisis. Normal service resumed to the two stations on March 16, 1981.

A 2011 village plan prepared for the city by MIT proposed a four-story development integrated with a rebuilt commuter rail station, with two high-level side platforms providing accessible boarding on both tracks.

Design for an accessible platform on the north side of the tracks reached 30% in November 2020 and was expected to be complete in spring 2022. The designs were later changed to have two platforms to reduce operational impacts. The new design reached 30% completion in early 2022. A ramp was added to the design scope at that time, delaying expected design completion to February 2024. Drilling for geotechnical surveying took place in October–November 2022. Design work for the Newton stations was paused at 75% completion in September 2023 because project costs had risen to $255 million.

The MBTA unsuccessfully applied for a federal grant for the projects in January 2024. In April 2024, lacking the federal funding, the MBTA indicated that it would proceed with Newtonville before Auburndale or West Newton.
