= Newtonville station =

Railway station in Newton, Massachusetts

Newtonville
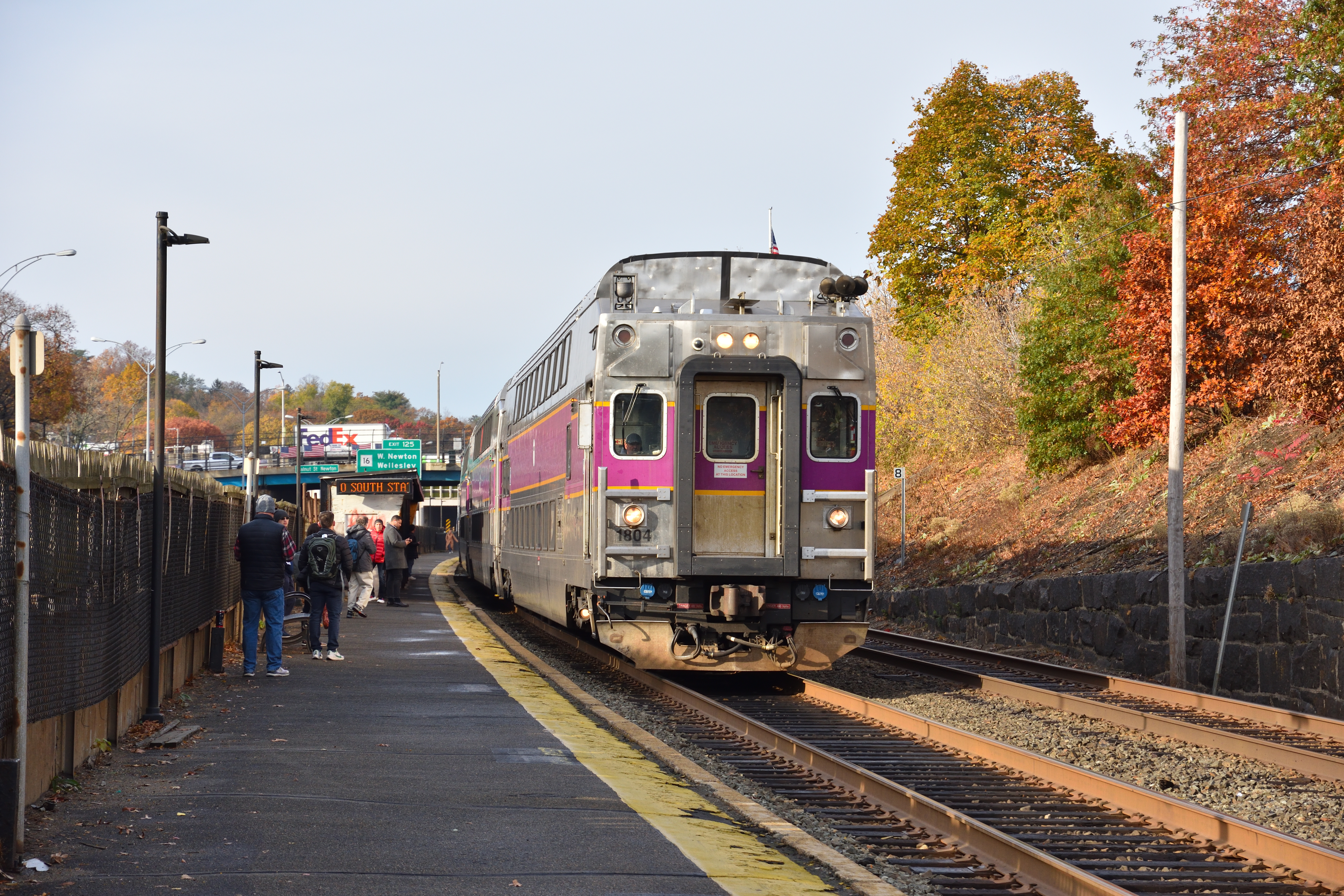
- An inbound train at Newtonville in November 2023

General information
- Location: 770 Washington Street; Newtonville, Massachusetts
- Coordinates: 42.35170°N 71.20525°W
- Line: Worcester Main Line
- Platforms: 1 side platform
- Tracks: 2
- Connections: MBTA bus: 59, 553, 554, 556

Construction
- Parking: None
- Accessible: No

Other information
- Fare zone: 1

History
- Opened: 1842
- Rebuilt: January 2027–June 2029 (planned)
- Former names: Hull's Crossing

Passengers
- 2024: 421 daily boardings

Services
Preceding station	MBTA	Following station
West Newton toward Worcester	Framingham/Worcester Line	Boston Landing toward South Station
Former services
Preceding station	Amtrak	Following station
Wellesley toward Philadelphia	Bay State	Boston Back Bay toward Boston South
Preceding station	New York Central Railroad	Following station
West Newton toward Albany	Boston and Albany Railroad Main Line	Newton toward Boston
Location

Newtonville station is a commuter rail station on the MBTA Commuter Rail Framingham/Worcester Line, located between the Massachusetts Turnpike and Washington Street at Newtonville Square in the village of Newtonville in Newton, Massachusetts. Stairway entrances are located on the bridges over the Turnpike at Walnut Street and Harvard Street. Newtonville station is not accessible; a reconstruction for accessibility is planned between 2027 and 2029.

== History ==
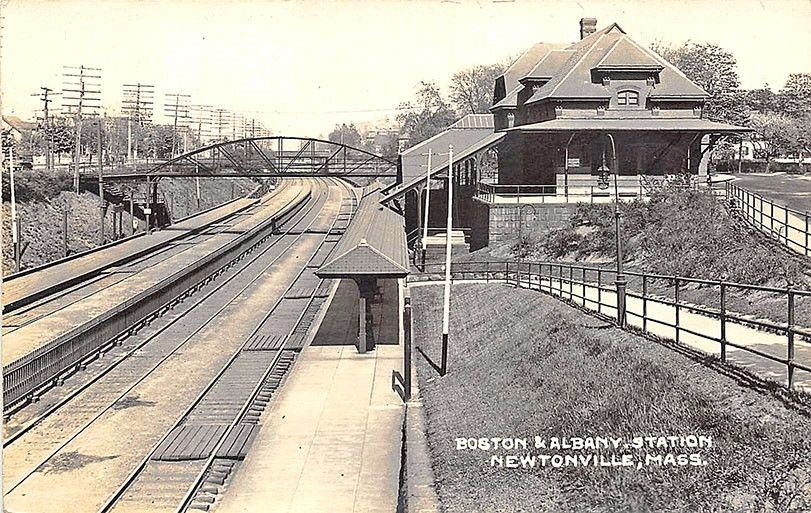
Newtonville station in the early 1900s

Hulls Crossing station opened as a flag stop on the Boston and Worcester Railroad in the early 1840s. It was first located on the south side of the tracks on the west side of Harvard Street, then later moved to the east side. The first station agent, Joshua Ramsdell, worked at Newtonville from 1844 to 1889, by which time he was "probably the oldest station agent in New England".

A red brick station was constructed slightly to the east in the 1870s, one of a small number of B&A stations built that decade. It ultimately became the first stop outside Boston for long-distance trains on the Boston and Albany Railroad.

The original station was destroyed in the 1960s by the extension of the Massachusetts Turnpike along the railroad's right-of-way, narrowing it from four tracks to two. After Amtrak took over intercity service in 1971, the Bay State briefly stopped at Newtonville.

The present station has one active side platform next to the southern track (Turnpike side); trains on the other track can be boarded via a wooden crossing, as is occasionally done when the southern track is closed for repairs. A second platform, now abandoned, sits aside the northern track. Both platforms are low level.

The station was temporarily closed on October 22–25, 2019, while repairs were made to the stairs.

=== Reconstruction ===
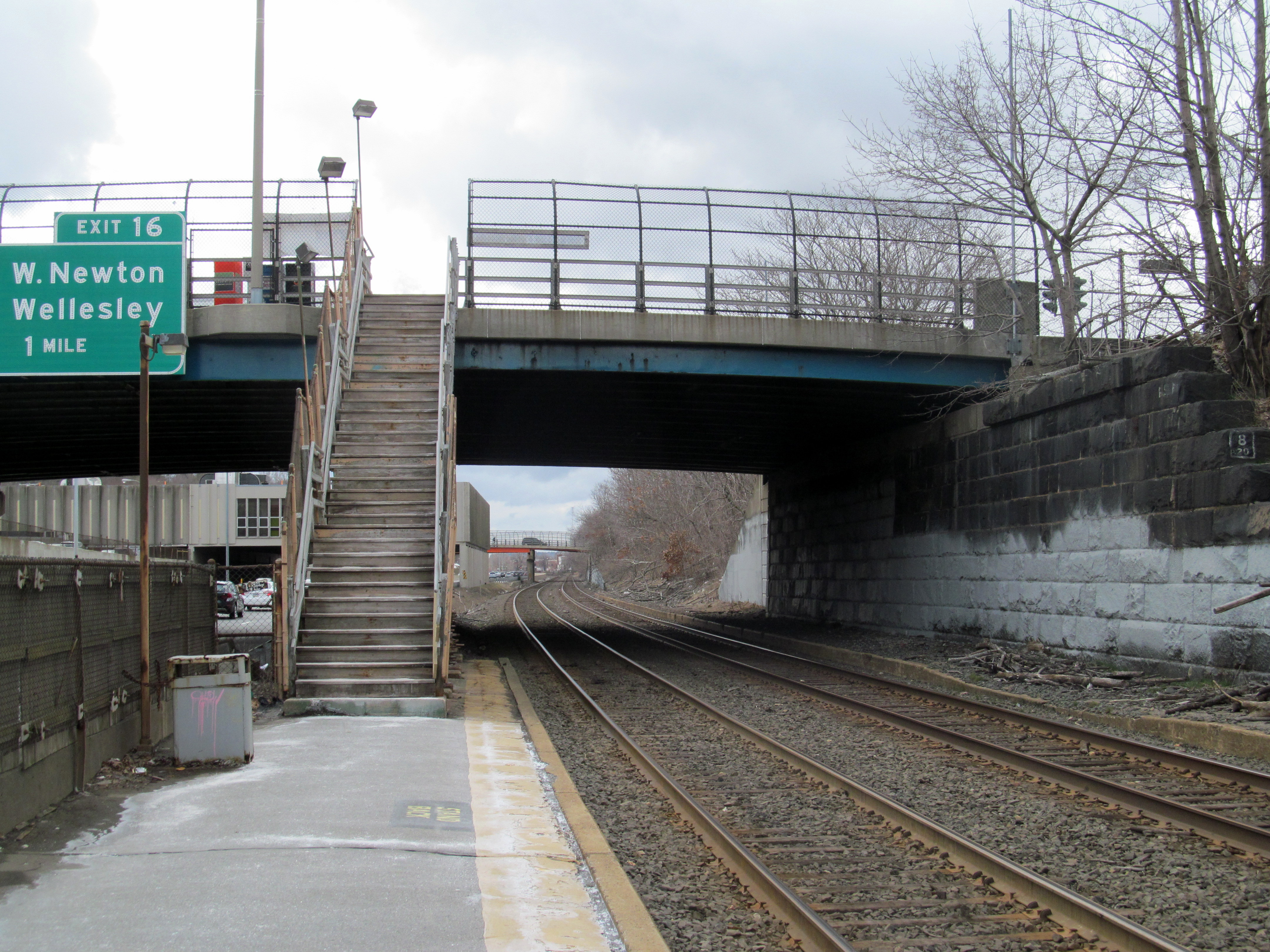
Stairs at Newtonville station in 2013

None of the stations on the Framingham line in Newton — Newtonville, West Newton, and Auburndale — are accessible. All have only one active platform, all low-level, and all are accessed by stairs. In 2019, the MBTA proposed three alternative plans to make the Newton stations accessible, so as to comply with the Americans with Disability Act. Plan 1 would add a high level platform on only one track, would cost an estimated $46 million and would take five years to complete. Plan 2 would have high-level side platforms on both tracks, would cost $129 million and take 8 years. The platform on the north side would be built first and used for service while the south platform was rebuilt. Plan 1 could be upgraded to Plan 2 at a later date. All stations would remain in service during construction of both plans. A more elaborate plan 3 would cost 218 million. Plan 3 would have center island platforms at each station and would take 12 years. Each station would have to be closed during its construction. Plans 2 and 3 would permit increased service to Newton, up to 20 inbound trains per day vs the current and Plan 1 limit of 13.

The MBTA opted for Alternative 1, providing a single side platform at each station, and awarded a design contract to Vanasse Hangen Brustlin. The projected timeline had all stations being complete by June 2024. Design reached 30% in November 2020 and was expected to be complete in spring 2022. The designs were later changed to have two platforms to reduce operational impacts. The new design reached 30% completion in early 2022. A ramp was added to the design scope at that time, delaying expected design completion to February 2024. Drilling for geotechnical surveying took place in October–November 2022. Design work for the Newton stations was paused at 75% completion in September 2023 because project costs had risen to $255 million.

The MBTA unsuccessfully applied for a federal grant for the projects in January 2024. In April 2024, lacking the federal funding, the MBTA indicated that it would proceed with Newtonville before West Newton or Auburndale. Two potential designs were shown for the station's redesign – a pair of side platforms close to Walnut Street, or a single island platform further east. Both concepts would have a platform length of just 400 feet (120 m), rather than the standard MBTA length of 800 feet (240 m).

In November 2024, the state committed to the reconstruction of Newtonville station with 400-foot side platforms. The MBTA issued a construction manager at risk contract in December 2025. Design was 30% complete by May 2026. By June 2026, early action work was expected to begin in November 2026, followed by main construction from March 2027 to spring 2029. The new station will include two high-level platforms, each accessible, with pathways, including elevator and stair connections to and from Washington Street and between the platforms. The budget for the project is $66 million. The station was originally expected to temporarily close in December for the duration of construction. However, in September 2026, the MBTA indicated that the station would remain open except for a three-month closure in 2027 and a two-month closure in 2029. The state received $15 million for the station project as part of a set of federal grants in September 2026. As of November 2026, the MBTA expects to start construction in January 2027.
