= Newtown, Stockton-on-Tees =

Electoral Ward of Stockton borough council, County Durham, England

Coordinates: 54.571°N 1.322°W

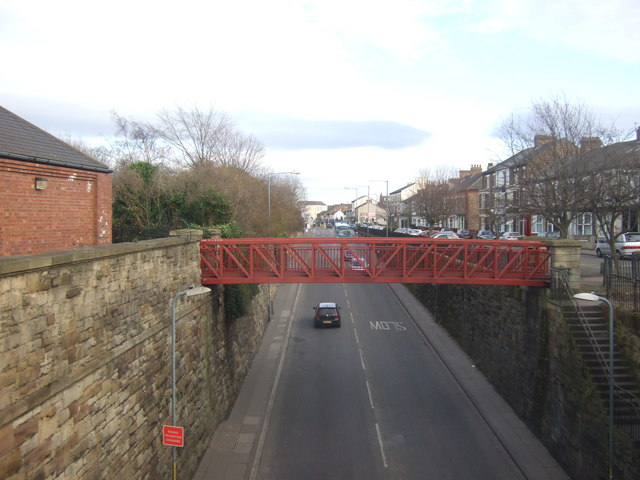
Bishopton Lane under

Newtown is an electoral ward within the borough of Stockton-on-Tees, County Durham, England. It is next to the Stockton town centre's north-west and is home to about 7,200 people.

As of 2025 the local councillor is Marilyn Surtees.

== See also ==
- Fairfield
- Roseworth
