= Newtown, Cornwall =

Hamlet in Cornwall, England

Coordinates: 50°06′47″N 5°23′38″W

Newtown
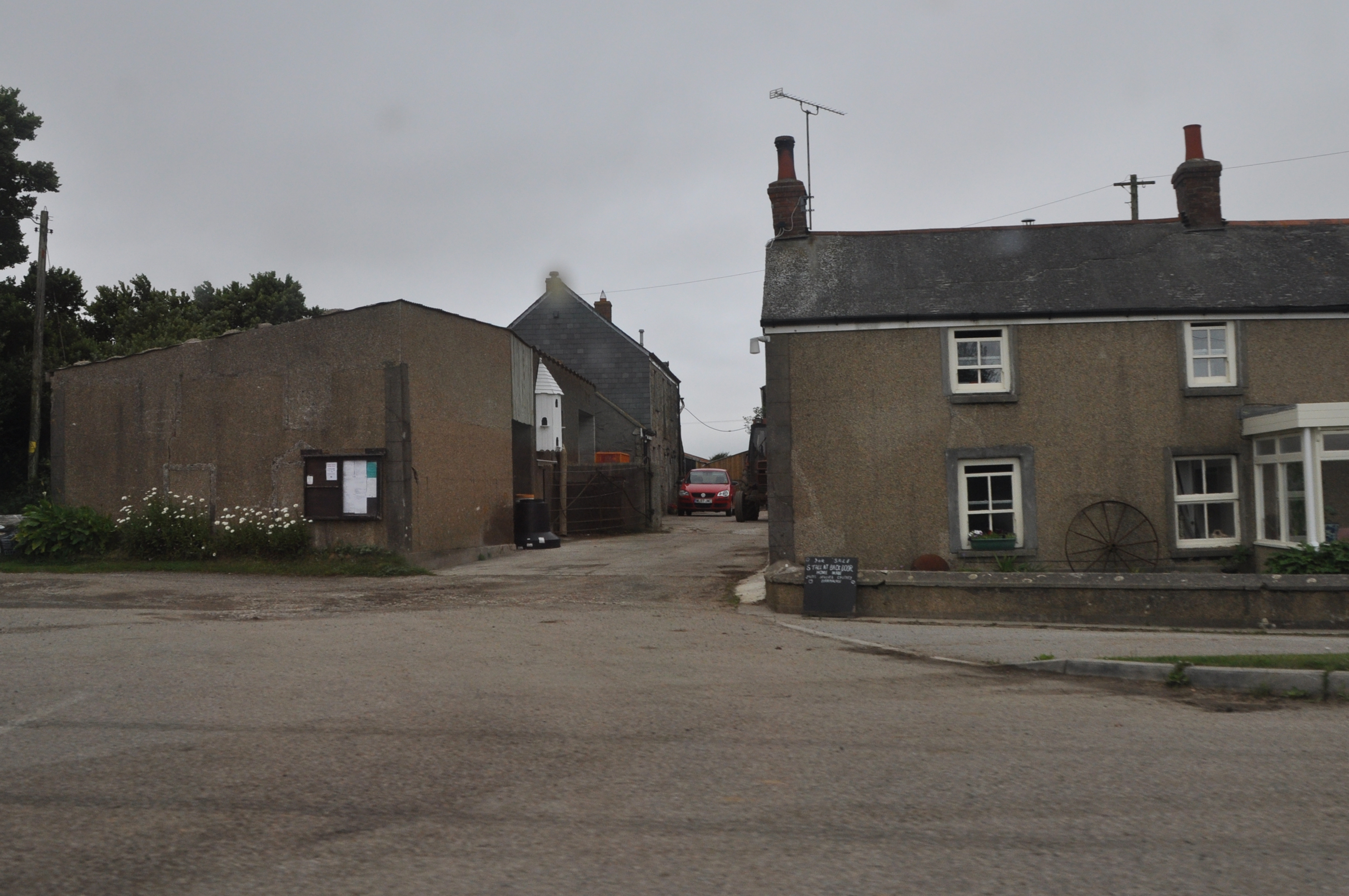

- Location within Cornwall
- Civil parish: Germoe
- Unitary authority: Cornwall
- Ceremonial county: Cornwall
- Region: South West
- Country: England
- Sovereign state: United Kingdom
- Police: Devon and Cornwall
- Fire: Cornwall
- Ambulance: South Western

Newtown is a hamlet in the parish of Germoe, Cornwall, England.
