= List of places in California (R) =

List of places in California - R

This list of current:

- cities
- towns, unincorporated communities
- counties, and other recognized places in the U.S. state of California.

Information on the number and names of counties in which the place lies, and its lower and upper ZIP Code bounds, if applicable are also included.

Name of place	Number of counties	Principal county	Lower zip code	Upper zip code
Rackerby	1	Yuba County	95972	
Raco	1	Fresno County		
Radec	1	Riverside County	92536	
Radnor	1	Tulare County		
Radum	1	Alameda County		
Radwin	1	Fresno County		
Rafael Village	1	Marin County	94949	
Raffetto	1	El Dorado County		
Ragby	1	Mariposa County		
Ragtown	1	San Bernardino County		
Rail Road Flat	1	Calaveras County	95248	
Rainbow	1	Placer County		
Rainbow	1	San Diego County	92028	
Rainbow Spring	1	Shasta County		
Rainbow Valley	1	San Diego County	92028	
Rainbow Wells	1	San Bernardino County		
Raisin	1	Fresno County	93652	
Raisin City	1	Fresno County		
Ralph	1	Tuolumne County	95370	
Ramirez	1	Los Angeles County	90037	
Ramona	1	Los Angeles County		
Ramona	1	Sacramento County		
Ramona	1	San Diego County	92065	
Ramona Bowl	1	Riverside County		
Ramona Indian Reservation	1	Riverside County	92263	
Ramsey	1	Mendocino County		
Rana	1	San Bernardino County		
Ranch Club Estates	1	Riverside County	92263	
Ranch House	1	San Diego County	92055	
Ranchita	1	San Diego County	92066	
Rancho Bernardo	1	San Diego County	92128	
Rancho Calaveras	1	Calaveras County		
Rancho Cordova	1	Sacramento County	95670	
Rancho Cucamonga	1	San Bernardino County	91701	39
Rancho Del Campo	1	San Diego County		
Rancho Del Mar	1	Napa County	94590	
Rancho Del Rey	1	San Diego County	91909	
Rancho Dominguez	1	Los Angeles County	90220	
Rancho Dos Palmas	1	Riverside County		
Rancho La Costa	1	San Diego County	92008	
Rancho Llano Seco	1	Butte County		
Rancho Marieta	1	Sacramento County	95683	
Rancho Mirage	1	Riverside County	92270	
Rancho Murieta	1	Sacramento County	95683	
Rancho Palos Verdes	1	Los Angeles County	90274	
Rancho Park	1	Los Angeles County	90064	
Rancho Rinconada	1	Santa Clara County	95014	
Rancho San Diego	1	San Diego County	92019	
Rancho San Fernando Rey	1	Santa Barbara County	93101	
Rancho Santa Clarita	1	Los Angeles County	91350	
Rancho Santa Fe	1	San Diego County	92067	91
Rancho Santa Margarita	1	Orange County	92688	
Rancho Seco	1	Kern County		
Rancho Tehama	1	Tehama County		
Rancho Trabuco	1	Orange County		
Randall	1	El Dorado County	95725	
Randall Island	1	Sacramento County	95615	
Randolph	1	Sierra County	96126	
Randsburg	1	Kern County	93554	
Ranlett	1	Amador County		
Ravendale	1	Lassen County	96123	
Ravenna	1	Los Angeles County		
Ravenswood	1	San Mateo County	94303	
Rawhide	1	Tuolumne County	95370	
Rawson	1	Tehama County	96080	
Raymer	1	Los Angeles County		
Raymond	1	Los Angeles County		
Raymond	1	Madera County	93653	
Raynor Park	1	Santa Clara County		
Rayo	1	Tulare County		
Reclamation	1	Sonoma County		
Rector	1	Tulare County	93291	
Red Apple	1	Calaveras County		
Red Bank	1	Tehama County	96080	
Redbanks	1	Tulare County		
Red Bluff	1	Tehama County	96080	
Redcrest	1	Humboldt County	95569	
Redding	1	Shasta County	96001	99
Redding Rancheria	1	Shasta County		
Red Dog	1	Nevada County		
Red Hill	1	Orange County	92705	
Redlands	1	San Bernardino County	92373	75
Redlands Heights	1	San Bernardino County	92373	
Redman	1	Los Angeles County		
Redmond Cut	1	Alameda County		
Red Mountain	1	San Bernardino County	93558	
Redondo Beach	1	Los Angeles County	90277	78
Redondo Junction	1	Los Angeles County		
Red Rock	1	Lassen County		
Reds Meadow	1	Mono County	93546	
Red Top	1	Madera County	95340	
Redway	1	Humboldt County	95560	
Redwood City	1	San Mateo County	94059	65
Redwood Corral	1	Tulare County		
Redwood Creek	1	Mendocino County		
Redwood Estates	1	Santa Clara County	95044	
Redwood Grove	1	Santa Cruz County	95006	
Redwood Harbor	1	San Mateo County		
Redwood Junction	1	San Mateo County		
Redwood National Park	2 Humboldt County	95531		
Redwoods	1	Shasta County		
Redwood Terrace	1	San Mateo County	94020	
Redwood Valley	1	Mendocino County	95470	
Redwood Valley Rancheria	1	Mendocino County		
Reed	1	Yuba County		
Reedley	1	Fresno County	93654	
Regina	1	Imperial County		
Regina Heights	1	Mendocino County		
Reilly Heights	1	Mendocino County		
Relief	1	Nevada County		
Renoville	1	San Bernardino County		
Represa	1	Sacramento County	95671	
Requa	1	Del Norte County	95548	
Rescue	1	El Dorado County	95672	
Reseda	1	Los Angeles County	91335	
Resighini Rancheria	1	Del Norte County	95546	
Retreat	1	Monterey County		
Reward	1	Inyo County		
Reward	1	Kern County		
Rex	1	Santa Barbara County		
Reyes	1	Los Angeles County		
Reynolds	1	Mendocino County	95467	
Rheem	1	Contra Costa County	94806	
Rheem Valley	1	Contra Costa County	94570	
Rhodes	1	San Joaquin County	95376	
Rialto	1	San Bernardino County	92376	77
Ribbonwood	1	Riverside County		
Ricardo	1	Kern County		
Riccas Corner	1	Sonoma County	95407	
Rice	1	San Bernardino County	92280	
Rich	1	Kern County		
Richardson Grove	1	Humboldt County	95440	
Richardson Springs	1	Butte County	95973	
Rich Bar	1	Plumas County		
Richfield	1	Orange County		
Richfield	1	Tehama County	96021	
Richgrove	1	Tulare County	93261	
Rich Gulch	1	Calaveras County		
Richmond	1	Contra Costa County	94801	05
Richmond	1	San Francisco County		
Richmond District	1	San Francisco County		
Richvale	1	Butte County	95974	
Ridge	1	Mendocino County		
Ridgecrest	1	Kern County	93555	
Ridgemark	1	San Benito County		
Ridgeville	1	Trinity County		
Ridgewoods Heights	1	Humboldt County		
Riego	1	Placer County	95626	
Riego	1	Sutter County	95626	
Rimcrest	1	Riverside County	92263	
Rimforest	1	San Bernardino County	92378	
Rimlon	1	Riverside County		
Rimpau	1	Los Angeles County	90019	
Rimrock	1	San Bernardino County	92268	
Rinckel	1	Shasta County		
Rincon	1	San Diego County		
Rincon	1	Santa Cruz County		
Rincon Annex	1	San Francisco County	94119	
Rincon Island	1	Ventura County	93001	
Rincon Indian Reservation	1	San Diego County	92082	
Rincon Valley	1	Sonoma County		
Rio Bonito	1	Butte County	95917	
Rio Bravo	1	Kern County	93306	
Rio Campo	1	Sonoma County	95462	
Rioco	1	Los Angeles County		
Rio Dell	1	Humboldt County	95562	
Rio Dell	1	Sonoma County	95436	
Rio del Mar	1	Santa Cruz County	95003	
Rio Hondo	1	Los Angeles County		
Rio Linda	1	Sacramento County	95673	
Rio Nido	1	Sonoma County	95471	
Rio Oso	1	Sutter County	95674	
Rio Vista	1	Solano County	94571	
Rio Vista Junction	1	Solano County		
Ripley	1	Riverside County	92272	
Ripon	1	San Joaquin County	95366	
Ripperdan	1	Madera County	93637	
Rivera	1	Los Angeles County	90660	
Riverbank	1	Stanislaus County	95367	
Riverbank Army Ammunition Plant	1	Stanislaus County	95367	
Riverbend	1	Fresno County		
Riverdale	1	Fresno County	93656	
Riverdale	1	Mendocino County		
Riverdale Park	1	Stanislaus County		
River Kern	1	Kern County	93238	
River Oaks	1	San Benito County		
River Pines	1	Amador County	95675	
River Road	1	Stanislaus County	95350	
Riverside	1	Humboldt County		
Riverside	1	Orange County	92663	
Riverside	1	Riverside County	92501	22
Riverside Grove	1	Santa Cruz County	95006	
Riverside Junction	1	Riverside County		
Riverside Park	1	Humboldt County		
Riverton	1	El Dorado County		
Riverview	1	Kern County	93306	
Riverview	1	San Diego County	92040	
Riverview	1	Shasta County		
Riverview	1	Yolo County		
Riverview Farms	1	San Diego County	92040	
Riviera	1	Los Angeles County		
Riviera Cliff	1	San Joaquin County	95204	
Riz	1	Glenn County		
Roads End	1	Tulare County	93238	
Roaring Creek Rancheria	1	Shasta County	96065	
Robbins	1	Sutter County	95676	
Robert	1	Alameda County		
Robertsville	1	Santa Clara County	95118	
Robinson Mills	1	Butte County		
Robinson Ranch	1	Orange County		
Robinson Rancheria	1	Lake County		
Robinsons Corner	1	Butte County	95965	
Robla	1	Sacramento County		
Roblar	1	Sonoma County		
Robles del Rio	1	Monterey County	93924	
Rob Roy Junction	1	Santa Cruz County		
Rochester	1	San Bernardino County		
Rockaway Beach	1	San Mateo County	94044	
Rockfield	1	Fresno County		
Rock Haven	1	Fresno County	93664	
Rocking Horse Ranchos	1	Los Angeles County	90731	
Rocklin	1	Placer County	95677	
Rock Mills	1	Alameda County		
Rockport	1	Mendocino County	95488	
Rockridge	1	Alameda County	94618	
Rocktram	1	Napa County		
Rockville	1	Solano County	94585	
Rockwell	1	San Joaquin County		
Rockwood	1	Imperial County		
Rocky Hill	1	Tulare County		
Rodeo	1	Contra Costa County	94572	
Rogas	1	Kern County		
Rogers Flat	1	Plumas County	95980	
Rogina Heights	1	Mendocino County	95482	
Rohnert Park	1	Sonoma County	94928	
Rohnerville	1	Humboldt County	95540	
Rohnerville Rancheria	1	Humboldt County		
Rolands	1	Sonoma County		
Rolinda	1	Fresno County	93706	
Rolling Hills	1	Los Angeles County	90274	
Rolling Hills	1	Los Angeles County	90274	
Rolling Hills	1	Madera County		
Rolling Hills	1	Riverside County	92306	
Rolling Hills Estates	1	Los Angeles County	90274	
Rolling Hills Estates	1	San Luis Obispo County	93401	
Rolling Hills Riviera	1	Los Angeles County	90731	
Rollingwood	1	Contra Costa County	94806	
Rolph	1	Humboldt County		
Romac	1	San Mateo County		
Romie Lane	1	Monterey County	93901	
Romoland	1	Riverside County	92585	
Roosevelt	1	Los Angeles County		
Roosevelt Corner	1	Los Angeles County	93534	
Roosevelt Terrace	1	Solano County	94590	
Rosamond	1	Kern County	93560	
Rose Bowl	1	Los Angeles County	91011	
Rosedale	1	Kern County	93314	
Roseland	1	Sonoma County	95407	
Rosemary	1	Santa Barbara County		
Rosemead	1	Los Angeles County	91770	
Rosemont	1	Sacramento County	95826	
Rosemont	1	San Diego County		
Roseville	1	Placer County	95661	95747
Roseville	1	San Diego County		
Rosewood	1	Humboldt County	95501	
Rosewood	1	Tehama County		
Ross	1	Marin County	94957	
Ross	1	Sonoma County		
Ross Corner	1	Imperial County	92222	
Rossmoor	1	Orange County	90720	
Rossmoor Highlands	1	Orange County	90720	
Rossmoor Leisure World	1	Orange County		
Rotavele	1	Glenn County	95951	
Rough and Ready	1	Nevada County	95975	
Round Mountain	1	Shasta County	96084	
Round Valley	1	Inyo County	93514	
Round Valley Indian Reservation	2	Mendocino County	95804	
Round Valley Indian Reservation	2	Trinity County	95804	
Routier	1	Sacramento County		
Rovana	1	Inyo County	93514	
Rowen	1	Kern County		
Rowland	1	Los Angeles County	91743	
Rowland Heights	1	Los Angeles County	91748	
Royal Gardens	1	San Diego County		
Royal Oaks	1	Los Angeles County		
Rubidoux	1	Riverside County	92509	
Rucker	1	Santa Clara County	95020	
Rudell	1	Los Angeles County	91780	
Rumsey	1	Yolo County	95679	
Rumsey Rancheria	1	Yolo County	95606	
Running Springs	1	San Bernardino County	92382	
Rupert	1	Yuba County	95901	
Russ	1	Los Angeles County		
Russell	1	Alameda County		
Russell	1	Solano County		
Russell City	1	Alameda County		
Russian River Terrace	1	Sonoma County	95436	
Rustic Canyon	1	Los Angeles County	90065	
Ruth	1	Trinity County	95526	
Rutherford	1	Napa County	94573	
Ryan	1	Inyo County		
Ryans Slough	1	Humboldt County		
Ryde	1	Sacramento County	95680	
