= Federal Surplus Commodities Corporation =

New Deal-era agriculture and food relief program

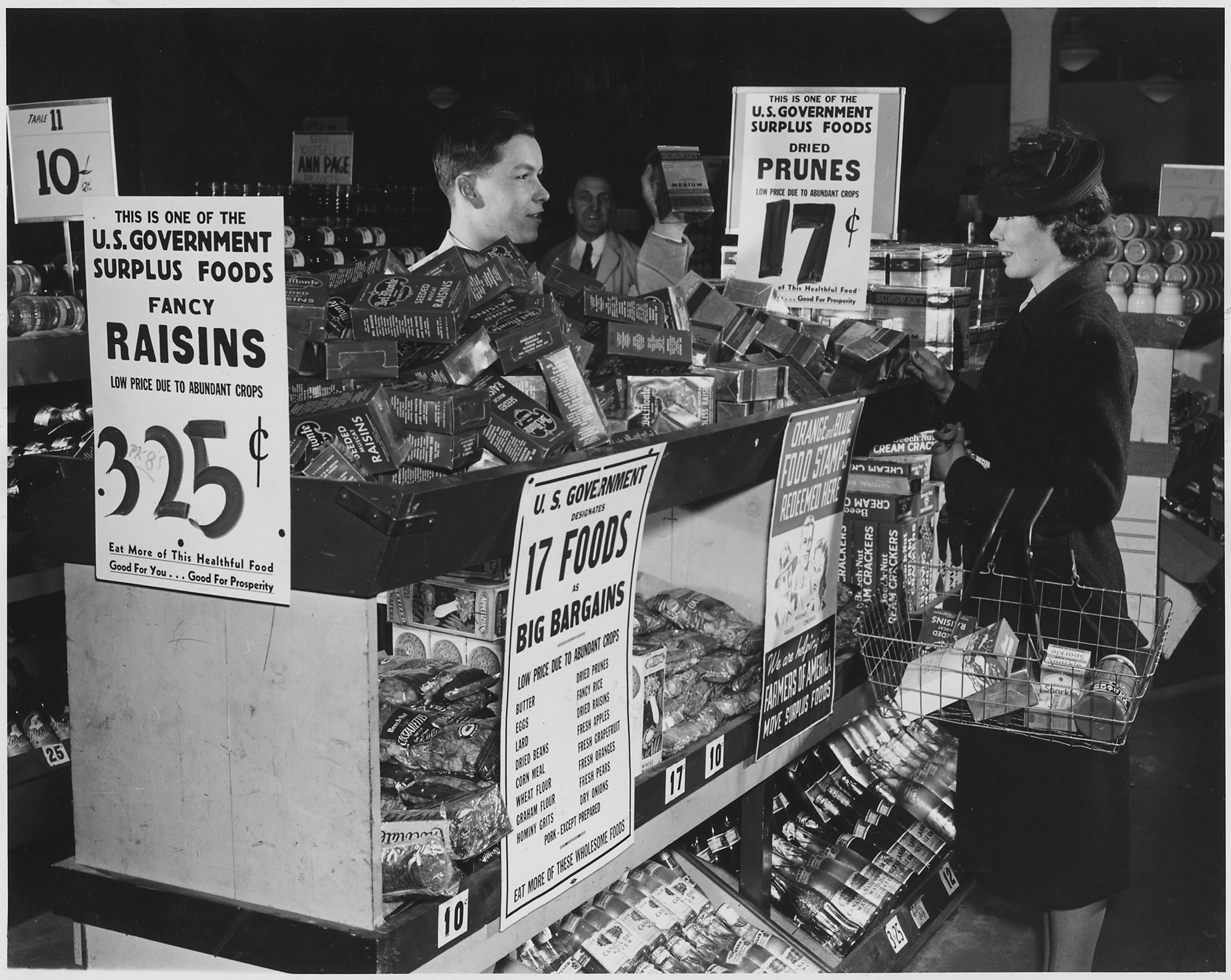
- Marketing surplus commodities (1939)

Agency overview
- Formed: Charter granted by State of Delaware, October 4, 1933
- Dissolved: February 23, 1942
- Superseding agency: Agricultural Marketing Administration
- Parent department: United States Department of Agriculture

The Federal Surplus Commodities Corporation was one of the so-called alphabet agencies set up in the United States during the 1930s as part of President Franklin D. Roosevelt's New Deal. Created in 1933 as the Federal Surplus Relief Corporation, its name was changed by charter amendment on November 18, 1935. In 1937 its administration was placed within the United States Department of Agriculture. In 1940 it was combined with other USDA initiatives to form the Surplus Marketing Administration. It was abolished February 23, 1942, with the creation of the Agricultural Marketing Administration.

The purpose of the agency was to divert agricultural commodities from the open market, where prices were depressed by surplus farm products, to destitute families.

As of 2012, the federal purchase and distribution of surplus food still continues, now under the auspices of the Emergency Food Assistance Program.

== History ==
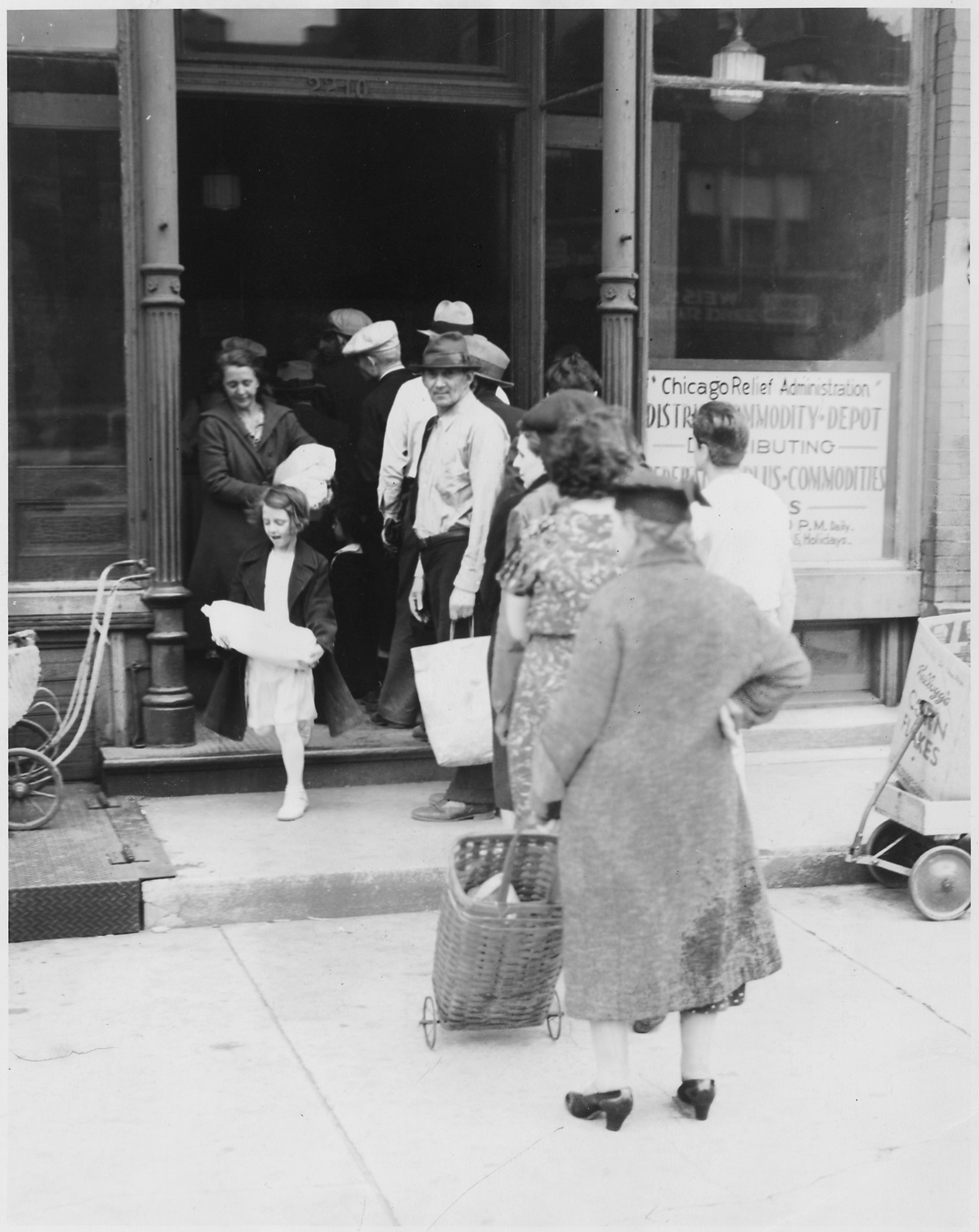
Distributing surplus commodities in Chicago (1936)

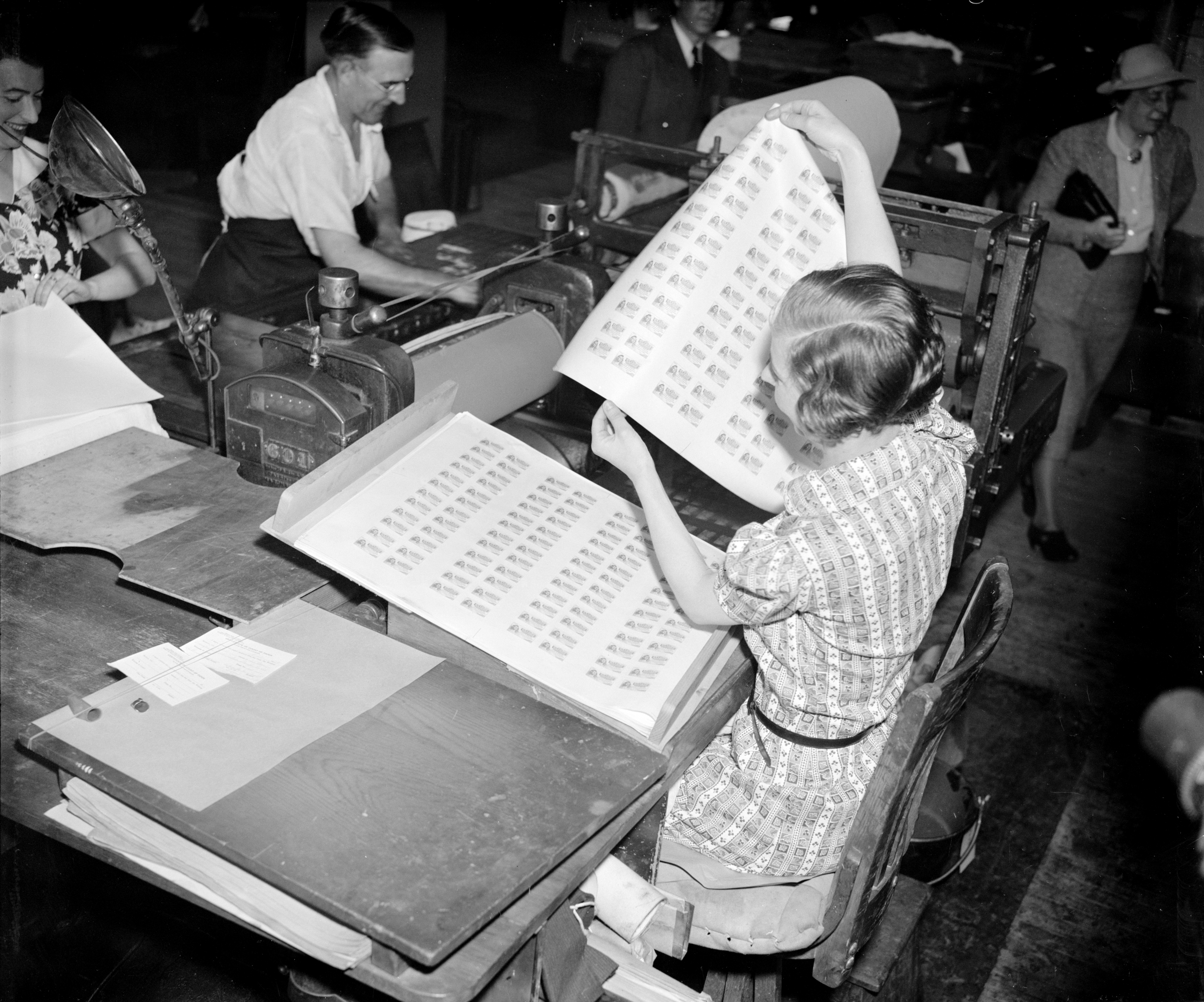
An effort to manage agricultural surpluses, the first food stamps (marked "F.S.C.C." at top) came off the presses at the Bureau of Engraving and Printing on April 20, 1939.

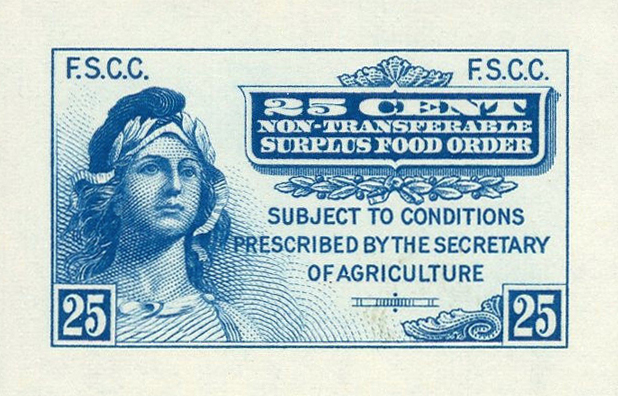
Orange stamps were good for any grocery item the purchaser chose, while blue stamps bought only surplus foods such as dairy products, eggs, citrus fruits, prunes and fresh vegetables.

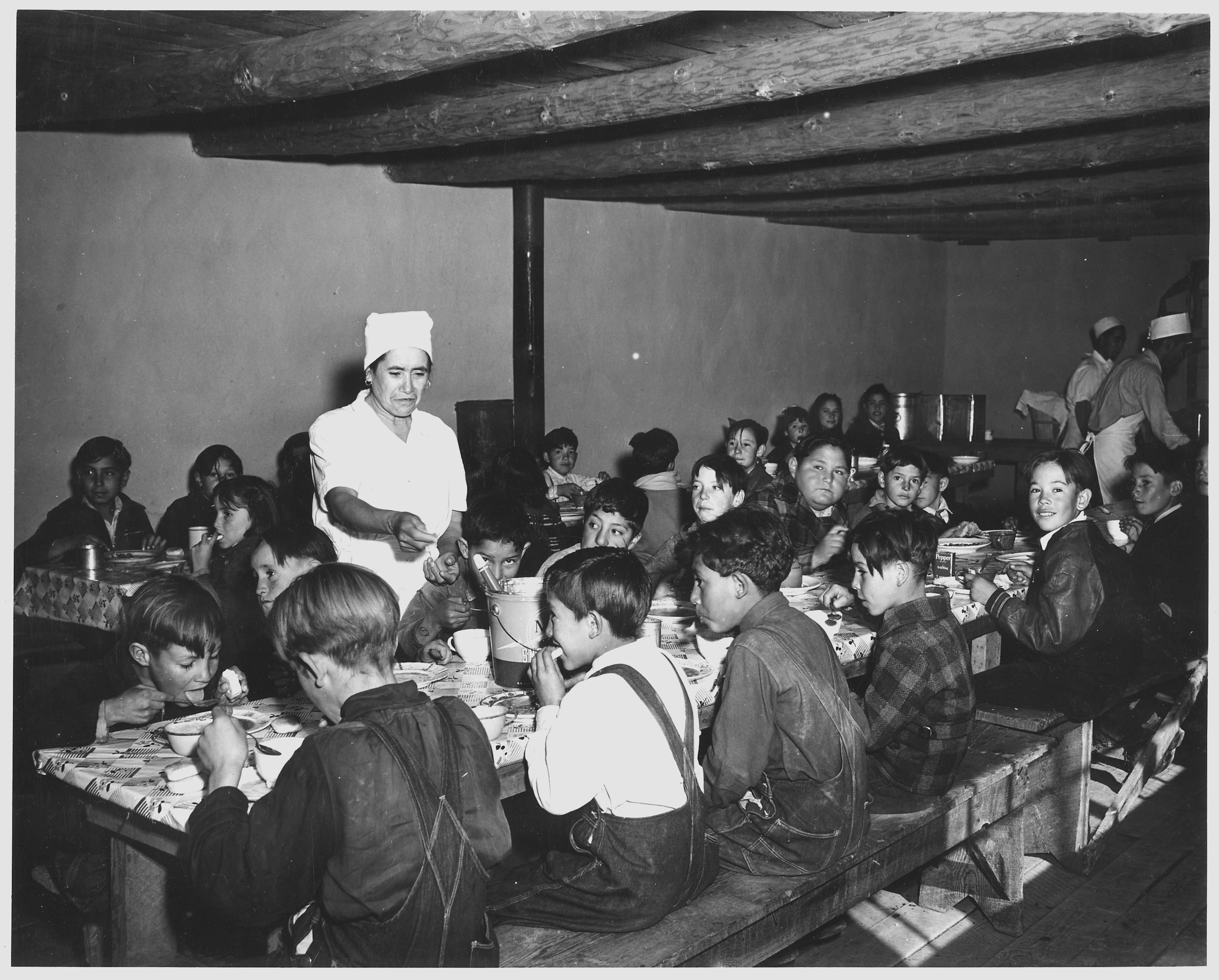
In Peñasco, New Mexico, students paid about one cent daily for a hot meal made primarily of food from the surplus commodities program, prepared by cooks paid by the Works Progress Administration (1941).

In summer 1933, the Agricultural Adjustment Administration tried to boost the wholesale price of agricultural produce through an artificial scarcity initiative, in which crops were plowed up or left to rot and six million pigs were killed and discarded. The public outcry over this waste of resources led to the October 1933 establishment of the Federal Surplus Relief Corporation, which aimed to divert commodities such as apples, beans, canned beef and cotton to local relief organizations. In December 1933, the agency distributed three million tons of coal to the unemployed of Wisconsin, Minnesota, Michigan, North Dakota, South Dakota and Iowa and in September 1934 shipped 692,228,274 pounds of foodstuffs to the unemployed in 30 US states.

On November 18, 1935, its name was changed to the Federal Surplus Commodities Corporation, and the Secretary of Agriculture, Henry A. Wallace at that time, the head of the Agricultural Adjustment Administration, and the governor of the Farm Credit Administration were placed on its board of directors.

The Federal Surplus Commodities Corporation was the first federal contribution to the school lunch programs and the first step toward the national school lunch program. In March 1937, there were 3,839 schools receiving commodities for lunch programs serving 342,031 children daily. Two years later, the number of schools participating had grown to 14,075 and the number of children had risen to 892,259.

The Federal Surplus Commodities Corporation was continued as an agency under the secretary of agriculture by acts of June 28, 1937 (50 Stat. 323) and February 16, 1938 (52 Stat. 38). The agency was consolidated with Division of Marketing and Marketing Agreements into Surplus Marketing Administration by Reorg. Plan No. III of 1940, then merged into Agricultural Marketing Administration by Executive Order 9069 of February 23, 1942.

During World War II, the federal purchase and distribution of food surpluses continued, including overseas supplies made under the Lend-Lease Act of 11 March 1941. A 1947 legal case relating to the contracted supply of dried eggs to the Federal Surplus Commodities Corporation for aid to Russia in 1942 (Priebe & Sons, Inc. v. United States) held that a provision in the contract for "liquidated damages" to be paid for late inspection and certification of the product constituted an unenforceable penalty clause.

Federal purchase and distribution of food continued after the war. In the 1960s, counties began to cease distributing the surpluses direct to low income individuals, instead providing an early form of food stamp.

The move to food stamps was criticized by most of the representatives of the Civil Rights Movement. Because Black sharecroppers relied on the federal surplus commodities as one of the only food sources and because Black sharecroppers were not earning money, the abandonment of the program meant many Black families went hungry. This phenomenon was protested and circumvented with independent food projects, such as the North Bolivar County food cooperative.

Since 1990, the main program responsible for the distribution of surpluses has been the Emergency Food Assistance and Soup Kitchen-Food Bank Program. In the 1980s, the program was called the Temporary Emergency Food Assistance Program. It is now often referred to as the Emergency Food Assistance Program and is administrated by the USDA. As of 2012, surpluses are still distributed, though to food banks and other emergency food agencies, not directly to individuals.

== See also ==
- Commodity Credit Corporation
- Government cheese
- Milo Randolph Perkins
- Supplemental Nutrition Assistance Program
