= Embassy of Belgium, Warsaw =

Embassy in Warsaw

Embassy of Belgium to Poland and Lithuania Ambassade van België in Polen en Litouwen Ambassade de Belgique en Pologne et en Lituanie Ambasada Belgii w Polsce i na Litwie
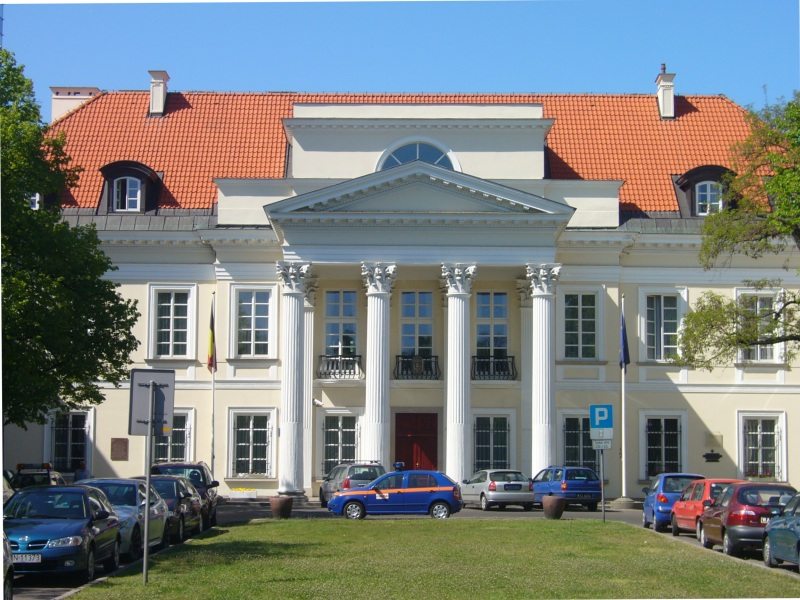
- Location: Warsaw
- Address: Ulica Senatorska, 34
- Opened: 10 March 1919
- Relocated: 1962 (current location)

The Embassy of Belgium in Warsaw is the diplomatic mission of Belgium for Poland and Lithuania. It is located in Ulica Senatorska, near the historical city center of Warsaw and the Theatre Square. The diplomatic mission was established in 1962. The embassy is based in Mniszech Palace, originally built for the Mniszech family in 1714. It was designed by Burkhard Christoph von Münnich, the General-Architect in the service of the King Augustus II the Strong. In the following decades the palace was several times severely damaged. After being destroyed during the Second World War, the Belgian government decided to rebuild the palace in its original shape. The reconstruction began in 1959.

== History of the Mniszech Palace ==
In the early 17th century there was a small wooden manner-house on the location of the palace. In 1714 Józef Wandalin Mniszech, the Grand Marshal of the Crown, becomes the owner of the property. He orders the building of the palace, led by General-Architect Burkhard Christoph von Münnich. Following the death of Mniszech, his son enriches the palace with extra sculptural decorations. In the beginning of the 19th century, after many changes of owners and a fire, a Prussian official Friedrich Wilhem Mosque acquires the place. With its new owner, E. T. A. Hoffmann visits the palace on a different occasions to host musical events. During the stay of Napoleon the French army transforms the palace in a field hospital. Hereby the interior design gets severely damaged. After the defeat of Napoleon, the palace will be used for different purposes: in 1809 it seats a puppet theater and a French theater, in 1817 it seats a Masonic lodge. Mniszech palace had a nickname in that period: Lucifer's Palace, after the opera of Karol Kurpiński, a Polish composer, conductor and pedagogue that showed affinity with Masonic themes and symbolism.

When the lodge is disbanded it is bought by an industrialist and banker. He conducts a thorough renovation of the palace, giving it neoclassical style reminiscent of the current shape of the palace. From 1919 till 1939 the Merchants’ chamber is the next owner of the building. During this period the Palace becomes the centre of the public and cultural life of Warsaw.

=== The Second World War ===
In September 1939, the Merchants’ Chamber transfers the Palace over to the Sovereign Military Order of Malta. In August 1944 the Germans order the evacuation of the hospital and on 20 September they set fire to the palace. The only parts that remain are the ruins of the outer wall and the burned columns of the front portico.

== See also ==
- List of diplomatic missions of Belgium
