= Benefit =

Benefit(s) may refer to:

== Arts and entertainment ==
- Benefit (album), by Jethro Tull, 1970
- "Benefits" (How I Met Your Mother), a 2009 TV episode
- "Benefits", a 2018 song by Zior Park
- The Benefit, a 2012 Egyptian action film

== Businesses and organisations ==
- Benefit Cosmetics, an American cosmetics company
- The Benefit Company, a Bahraini interbanking company

== Places ==
- Benefit, Georgia, US

== Welfare and employment ==
- Benefit (social welfare)
  - Federal benefits, US
  - Unemployment benefits
- Benefit (sports), a pre-retirement event to benefit a player
- Benefit performance, entertainment to support a cause
  - Benefit concert, or charity concert
- Employee benefits
  - Health benefits (insurance)

== See also ==
- Entitlement (disambiguation)
- Health benefits (medicine)
- Incentive
- Incentive program
- Loyalty marketing
- Loyalty program
- Reward (disambiguation)
- Value (disambiguation)
