= Water stop =

Place along a steam railroad

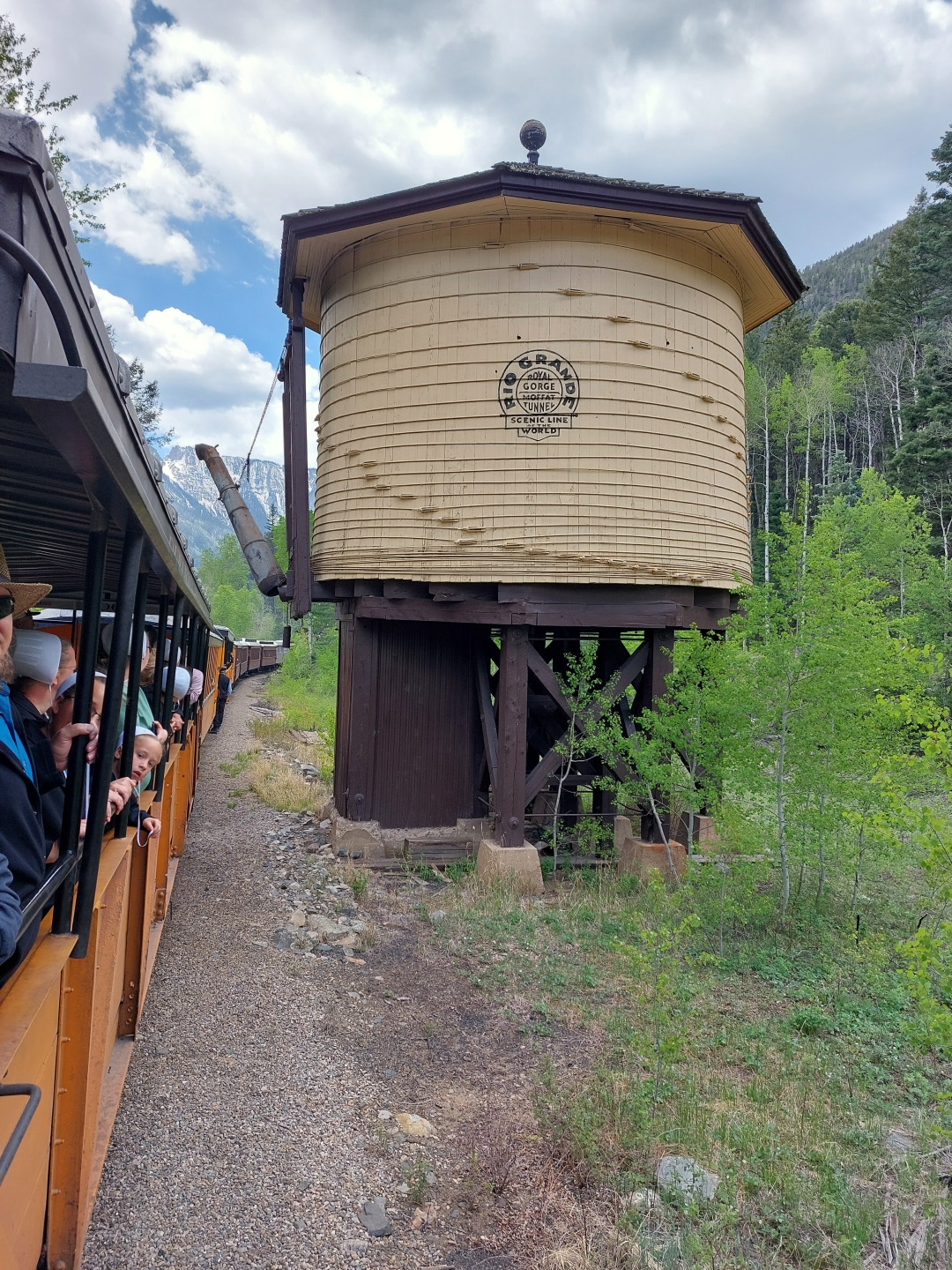
Typical wooden water tank along the Durango and Silverton Narrow Gauge Railroad in May 30, 2024.

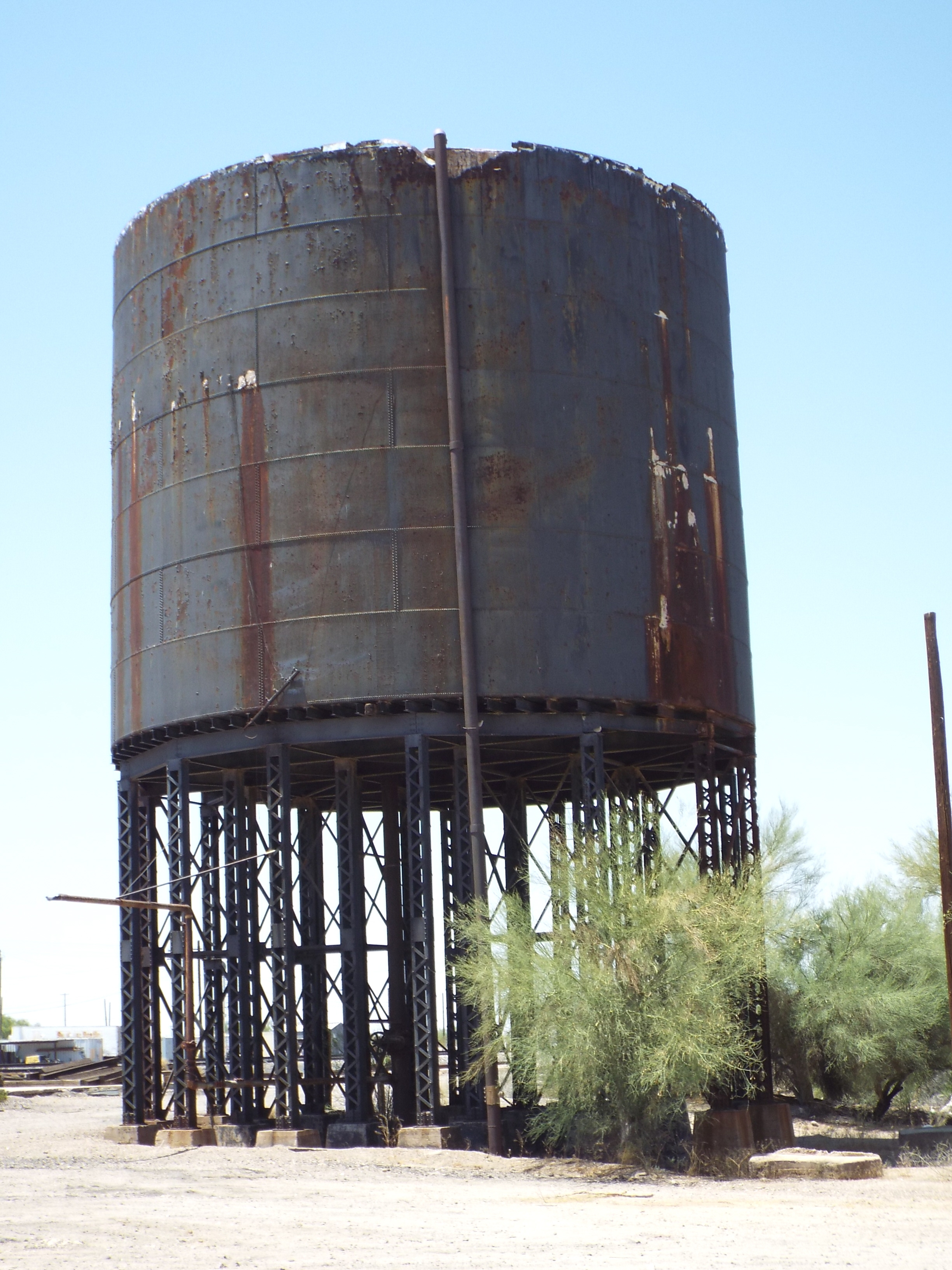
The Gila Bend Steam Locomotive Water Stop was built in 1900 and is located in Gila Bend, Arizona

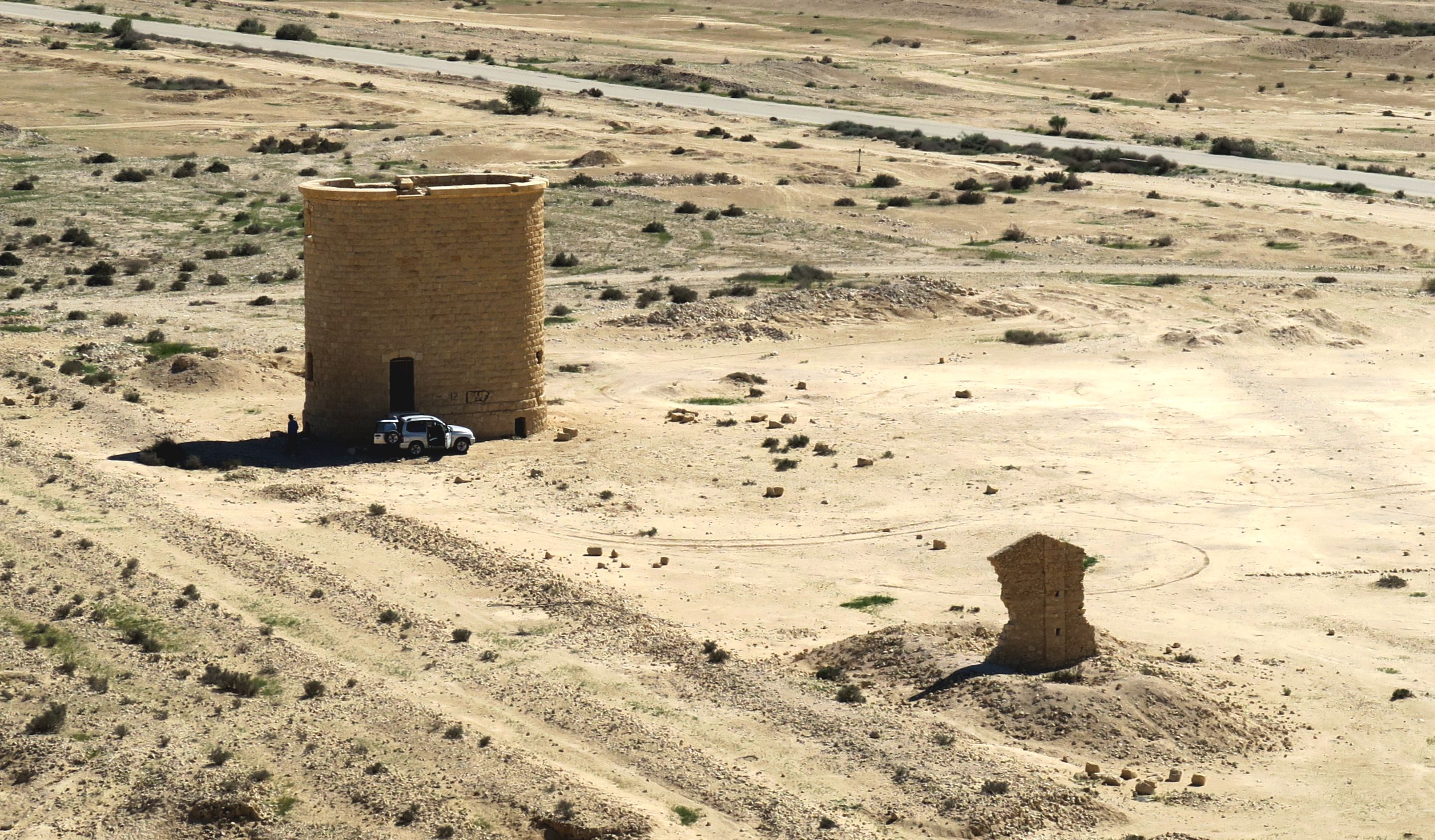
Remnants of Turkish railway station in Nitzana, Israel. Left: Water stop. Right: Wall of the Stationmaster's office.

A water stop or water station on a railroad is a place where steam trains stop to replenish water. The stopping of the train itself is also referred to as a "water stop". The term originates from the times of steam engines when large amounts of water were essential. Also known as wood and water stops or coal and water stops, since it was reasonable to replenish engines with fuel as well when adding water to the tender.

== United States ==
During the very early days of steam locomotives, water stops were necessary every 7–10 miles (11–16 km) and consumed much travel time. (Note: For example, a section of the Atlantic and Pacific Railroad running in the Mojave Desert between Ludlow and Amboy had water stops spaced every 5–10 miles: Lavic, Ragtown, Ash Hill, Klondike, Siberia, Bagdad,) With the introduction of tenders (a special car containing water and fuel), trains could run 100–150 miles (160–240 km) without a refill.

To accumulate the water, water stops employed water tanks, water towers and tank ponds. The water was initially pumped by windmills, watermills, or by hand pumps often by the train crew themselves. Later, small steam and gasoline engines were used.

As the U.S. railroad system expanded, large numbers of tank ponds were built by damming various small creeks that intersected the tracks in order to provide water for water stops. Largemouth bass were often stocked in tank ponds.

Many water stops along new railways evolved into new settlements. When a train stopped for water and was positioned by a water tower, a member of the engine crew, usually the fireman, swung out the spigot arm over the water tender and "jerked" the chain to begin watering. This gave rise to a 19th-century slang term "Jerkwater town" for towns too insignificant to have a regular train station. Some water stops grew into established settlements: for example, the town of Coalinga, California, formerly, Coaling Station A, gets its name from the original coal stop at this location. On the other hand, with the replacement of steam engines by diesel locomotives many of the then obsolete water stops, especially in deserted areas, became ghost towns.

During the days of the Wild West, isolated water stops were among the favorite ambush places for train robbers.

== See also ==
- Track pan - a water trough
- Water crane
