= Roads End =

Roads End may refer to:

- Roads End, California, an unincorporated community
- Roads End State Recreation Site, a state park in Oregon

== See also ==
- End of the Road (disambiguation)
