= Siberia, California =

Siberia
- Ghost town
- Location within the state of California Siberia (the United States)
- Coordinates: 34°37′36″N 115°59′09″W
- Country: United States
- State: California
- County: San Bernardino
- Elevation: 1,283 ft (391 m)
- Time zone: UTC-8 (Pacific)
  - Summer (DST): UTC-7 (PDT)
- ZIP code: 92357
- Area codes: 442/760
- GNIS feature ID: 1661437

Siberia is a ghost town in the Mojave Desert of San Bernardino County, California, United States. It lies along historic Route 66 between Bagdad and Ludlow, in the ZIP code 92357 and area codes 442 and 760.

Siberia was a water stop and a rail siding for the Santa Fe Railroad and a motorist stop on U.S. Route 66 until it faded out after the 1973 opening of Interstate 40, which bypassed the town. Since 2001, all traces of the town have been removed.

== See also ==
- List of ghost towns in the United States
