= Bagdad-Chase Mine =

Abandoned gold mine in the Bullion Mountains of California, USA

Coordinates: 34°37′39″N 116°10′1″W

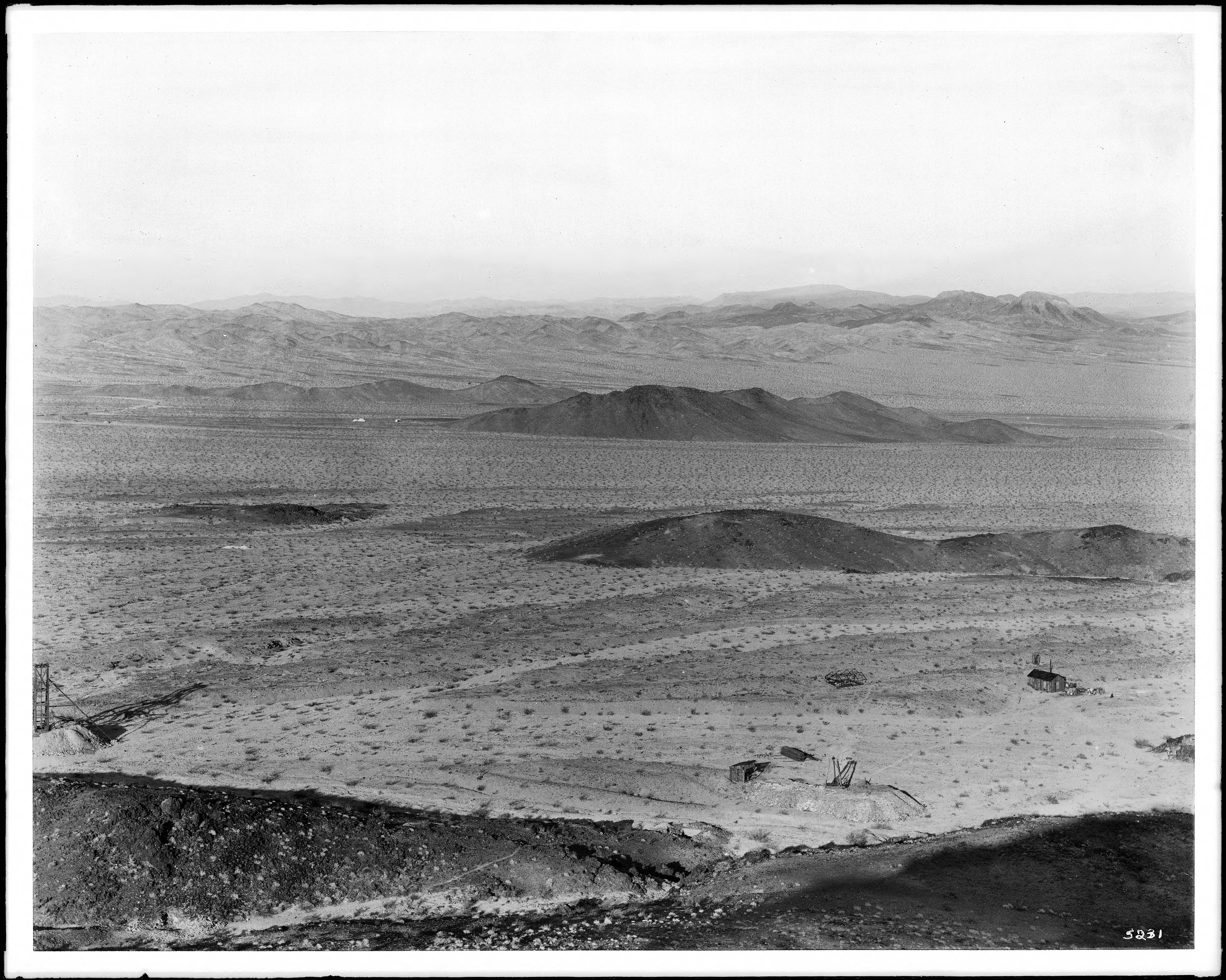
- Scenic view of the Mojave Desert and Providence Mountain from Bagdad Mine (the Chase Mill Site), Riverside, ca.1903

- The Bagdad-Chase Mine on a map of California.
- Location: California, United States
- Products: Gold, Copper, Silver, Lead, Zinc
- Production: 150,000 tons of gold
- Financial year: lifetime
- Greatest depth: 200 feet
- Discovered: 1898
- Opened: 1900
- Active: 1900 – circa 1950, briefly in 1971
- Closed: circa 1950
- Company: John Suter and Company (1900–1902), Bagdad Mining Company (1902–1910), Pacific Mining Corporation (1910–1971), Bagdad-Chase Incorporated (1971–present)

The Bagdad-Chase Mine is a deep mine in the Bullion Mountains of the Mojave Desert. It is located in San Bernardino County, California. It once was the largest single producer of gold and copper in the county. Bagdad Chase Road is named after the Bagdad-Chase Mine, and runs parallel to the Ludlow and Southern Railroad. It is part of the Steadman-Rochester-Buckeye (or Bagdad-Amboy) Mining District. It is located nearby the Marine Corps Air Ground Combat Center Twentynine Palms.

== History ==
=== Establishment and peak ===
In 1898, Santa Fe railroad worker and Swiss pioneer, John Sutter (also spelled Suter) found gold while searching for a water source in the Mojave. A mine opened in 1900 when John Suter and Company employed a dozen miners to extract minerals from the land John Sutter claimed after discovering the gold. At the end of 1901 the first shipment of ore was sold and sent to a mill owned by the Randsburg Company in nearby Barstow, California, for a high profit. By the beginning of 1902, the land claims were sold to the Bagdad Mining Company for $100,000 (from which the Bagdad-Chase Mine acquired part of its name; the mine is also named for Benjamin Chase, who built the Santa Fe railroad, and whom the nearby Chase Mill was also named for),and soon after the Ludlow Southern Railroad was laid from the nearby town of Ludlow to its terminus at the mining site. Ludlow saw a significant boom in population and economic stimulation as a result of the nearby mining activity generating jobs.

Peak mining activity occurred between 1904 and 1916, with 4.5 million dollars worth of gold alone being extracted from the Bagdad-Chase Mine between the years of 1904 and 1910 alone. In 1910 the Pacific Mines Corporation took over operating the mine and shipped the ore mined to a mill in Clarkdale, Arizona.

The Bagdad-Chase Mine produced 150,000 tons (6 million dollars' worth of gold) of ore in its lifetime, and mined half of the gold mined in San Bernardino County's history.

=== Downfall ===
Although the Bagdad-Chase mine survived the Panic of 1907 and the Great Depression, which saw many of the mines in the area close, and even though the Bagdad-Chase Mine was one of only four in California that was allowed to continue extracting ore during World War II (Bagdad-Chase produced ores that were useful as flux), the Bagdad-Chase mine would go into receivership in the 1930s, and would halt operations in the early 1950s. Shortly before that, in 1947 and 1948, ore would be extracted from a 200 foot vertical shaft.

== Modern-day ==
In 1971 the Bagdad-Chase Company (named after the Bagdad-Chase Mine) would purchase the property and extract a further 14,000 tons of ore from an open pit. This ore was brought to the Goldome Mill in Vanderbilt, California, and processed 3 months after. A 1999 earthquake may have had effects on the mine.

Bagdad Chase Incorporated currently owns the property and is dedicated to developing mines in San Bernardino County. In 2012 Bagdad Chase Inc. announced plans to reopen the Bagdad-Chase Mine after the Cestle Mountain Mine yielded $2 billion in gold in silver.

The property consists of 20 patented land claims.

== Stedman and Ragtown ==
Stedman is classified as a hot desert under the Köppen climate classification. Ragtown is classified as a cold desert under the Köppen climate classification.

=== Activity ===
Stedman, the site of the Bagdad-Chase Mine was originally called Camp Rochester, after Rochester, New York, the hometown of many of the mine board's members and investors, but after it was realized that a Rochester already existed in San Bernardino County (not as its own community or city but as a neighborhood in Rancho Cucamonga), the mining camp was renamed to Stagg and then later Stedman (Steadman was the surname of one of the mine's investors). The name Bagdad was also considered, and a nearby community chose the name Bagdad after Baghdad, Iraq. By November 1902, Stedman was at its peak activity with 40 cabins of five, four, and three rooms mid-construction (construction would finish in 1903). The outhouses were located behind the cabins. Stedman also had telephone service.

On March 28, 1904, a post office (named after Stedman's general manager) was established (it was discontinued in November 1907). Since John Sutter never found any water, Stedman's water supply was piped in from nearby Newberry Springs and stored in a 10,000 gallon water tank atop a hill in the surrounding desert. A company store existed on site while it was owned by the Pacific Mines Corporation, which site employees were barred from purchasing from. Miners working for other nearby mines such as the Pacific Mine and Roosevelt Mine also lived in Stedman. Since so many Stedman miners were Scandinavian, locals began to jokingly refer to Stedman as Copenhagen, in reference to the Danish capital city. A local celebrity, Mother Preston, operated a saloon and restaurant in Stedman. Stedman may have once contained a small kitchen and a mess hall. Stedman's camp superintendent was Edward H. Stagg. Neither liquor nor prostitution were allowed in Stedman.

Another settlement, Ragtown, existed north of Stedman (having been established later) on Bagdad Chase Road. Ragtown's name was derived from the many tents that served as its residents sleeping quarters, as well as its infamy as a red-light district, as a ragtown was another word for that.

=== Abandonment ===
Stedman, by October 1971 had turned completely to a ghost town. Presently, all that remains of Stedman are the bare foundations and crumbling husks or rubble of very few of the town's buildings (including a cook shack and mess hall), many of which are scorched after an attempt by vandals to destroy what was left of Stedman. Old mining equipment, dysfunctional cars, burned crucibles, fuel tanks (described as partially buried), and glass bottles can be found abandoned across the settlement. The rusted remnants of the water tank, now covered in graffiti warning visitors not to enter any of the deadly mine entrances around the site, can also be seen at the bottom of the hill. Newspapers from soon after Stedman's desolation mention gems and minerals strewn across the dirt (including chrysocolla rocks around the camp. Nearly a mile of the Ludlow and Southern Railroad has been washed out and destroyed by a 1932 thunderstorm. Some of the track was sold to the Philippines when the Bagdad-Chase Mine went into receivership.

Little remains of Ragtown except a few building foundations, a trash midden, and a boulder-lined dirt road, as well as the Old Pete Mine. A plaque commemorating the historical significance of Ragtown was installed by E Clampus Vitus in 1981.

The plaque reads:

Site of Ragtown and the Buckeye Mining District

At this location, Ragtown stood as a part of the once-booming "Buckeye Mining District". One mine in the district, the Bagdad-Chase, discovered by John Suter in the 1880s, was to become the largest single source of copper and gold in San Bernardino County. The owner, Benjamin Chase, built the Ludlow and Southern Railroad, just west of here, to carry ore to the Santa Fe Railroad in Ludlow.

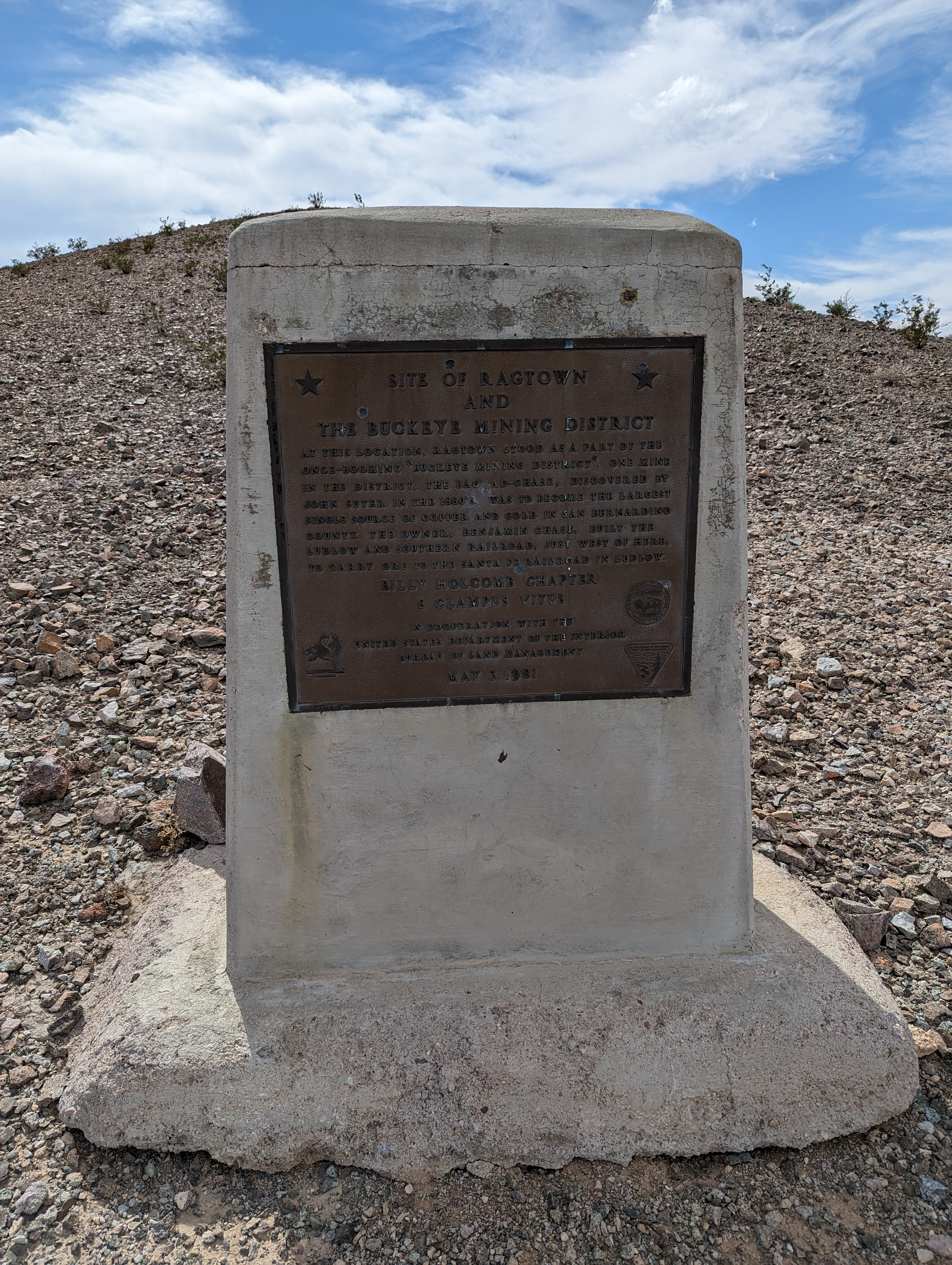
Dedicatory plaque at the site of Ragtown and the Buckeye Mining District

== Geology ==
Most of Stedman's mineral deposits are located within breccia zones that occur within porphyry andesite. While the Bagdad-Chase Mine was best known for its gold and copper ores, it also produced silver, zinc, and lead.
