= Reward =

Reward may refer to:

== Places ==
- Reward (Shelltown, Maryland), a historic home in Shelltown Maryland
- Reward, California (disambiguation)
- Reward-Tilden's Farm, a historic home in Chestertown Maryland
- Reward, Saskatchewan, a hamlet in Canada

== Arts, entertainment, and media ==
- "Reward" (song), a 1981 song by The Teardrop Explodes
- The Reward (opera), an 1815 opera by Karol Kurpiński
- The Reward (1965 film), a 1965 American Western film
- The Reward, 2009 short film with Anatol Yusef and Phoebe Waller-Bridge
- The Reward (1915 film) by Reginald Barker starring Bessie Barriscale and Arthur Maude

== Business and economics ==
- Bounty (reward), a reward, often money, which is offered as an incentive
- Cashback reward program, an incentive program
- Reward website, a website that offers rewards for performing tasks

== Science ==
- Brain stimulation reward, an operant response following electrical stimulation of the brain
- Incentive salience, the form of motivational salience which is associated with rewards
- Reward dependence, a personality trait in psychology
- Reward system, the brain structures and neural pathways that are involved in reward cognition

== See also ==
- Award
- Incentive
- Incentive program
- Loyalty program
- Premium (marketing), e.g., "premiums"
