= My EBT =

2011 song by Stanley Lafleur

"My EBT" is a 2011 hip-hop song performed by Stanley Lafleur under the alias "Mr. EBT". The song laments what can be done with an Electronic Benefit Transfer card (used for social service/public assistance benefits in the United States), part of the welfare system.

The song and its video became controversial, especially among conservative pundits, who considered the song a glorification of the country's welfare system, even though it was a parody.

== Content ==
The lyrics of "My EBT" are based on real-life examples of welfare abuse that Lafleur had witnessed first-hand. The song laments a person using their sister's E.B.T. card (which is considered to be a fraudulent and hence also abusive use of the card) to acquire a large array of junk food (mostly potato chips and soft drinks) from various stores ("never going hungry, swiping all day"), and attempting to, but failing to also purchase marijuana and alcohol on the card as well. As an excuse for the actions, the song also states that it is okay because "it's an E.B.T., it ain't food stamps."

The song was also accompanied by a music video posted on YouTube, which featured Lafleur going around to various stores to purchase junk food using an E.B.T. card, much like what is described in the song itself.

== Reception ==
The song gained attention when its music video was posted by the Drudge Report. Numerous conservative commentators and websites criticized the song and video, complaining that the video "celebrat[ed] the pure coolness of any and all things gotten for nothing", and glorified welfare. Ben Shapiro criticized the song by evoking racist imagery and stating that the rapper is "the sort of leech who is bankrupting our society."

In response to the criticism, Lefleur defended the video by saying that the song and video represented the problems with the E.B.T. system and people who abuse it, described as being people who "[rub] the benefit card in the face of taxpayers" (as he portrayed himself doing in the video), thus denying help to those who really need it the most.
