= Soup Kitchen-Food Bank Program =

U.S. federal aid program

The Soup Kitchen-Food Bank Program was originally authorized under the Hunger Prevention Act of 1988 to buy commodities for soup kitchens and food banks not participating in the Emergency Food Assistance Program (EFAP). This program was consolidated with EFAP by an amendment to the Emergency Food Assistance Act of 1983 (P.L. 98-92) that was enacted as part of the 1996 welfare reform law (Personal Responsibility and Work Opportunity Reconciliation Act of 1996 (P.L. 104-193)). Program authority was extended through FY2007 by the 2002 farm bill (P.L. 107-171, Sec. 4126).
