= Stedman, California =

Abandoned mining camp in San Bernardino County, California, USA

Coordinates: 34°37′47″N 116°10′05″W

Stedman, also known as Copenhagen, is a ghost town in the Bagdad-Chase area of the Mojave Desert, located in San Bernardino County, California. Stedman, which sits near the end of Bagdad Chase Road, is approximately 2 miles south of Ragtown, 2 miles north of Pacific Mesa, and 8 miles south of Ludlow. Stedman's camp superintendent was Edward H. Stagg.

Stedman on a map of California.

== History ==
Stedman was founded by John Sutter when he found gold in the Bagdad-Chase area in 1898.

Stedman was the site of the Bagdad-Chase Mine was originally called Camp Rochester, after Rochester, New York, the hometown of many of the mine board's members and investors, but after it was realized that a Rochester already existed in San Bernardino County (not as its own community or city but as a neighborhood in Rancho Cucamonga), the mining camp was renamed to Stagg and then later Stedman (Steadman was the surname of one of the mine's investors). The name Bagdad was also considered, and a nearby community chose the name Bagdad after Baghdad, Iraq. By November 1902, Stedman was at its peak activity with 40 cabins of five, four, and three rooms mid-construction (construction would finish in 1903). The outhouses were located behind the cabins. Stedman also had telephone service. On March 28, 1904, a post office (named after Stedman's general manager) was established (it was discontinued in November 1907). Since John Sutter never found any water, Stedman's water supply was piped in from nearby Newberry Springs and stored in a 10,000 gallon water tank atop a hill in the surrounding desert. A company store existed on site while it was owned by the Pacific Mines Corporation, which site employees were barred from purchasing from. Miners working for other nearby mines such as the Pacific Mine and Roosevelt Mine also lived in Stedman. Since so many Stedman miners were Scandinavian, locals began to jokingly refer to Stedman as Copenhagen, in reference to the Danish capital city. A local celebrity, Mother Preston, operated a saloon and restaurant in Stedman. Stedman may have once contained a small kitchen and a mess hall. Stedman's camp superintendent was Edward H. Stagg. Neither liquor nor prostitution were allowed in Stedman.

When the mine went into receivership, The Ludlow and Southern Railroad's, which ends in Stedman, near the Bagdad Chase Mine, track was sold to the Philippines in the 1930s and Stedman was abandoned.

== Remains ==
Stedman, by October 1971 had turned completely to a ghost town. Presently, all that remains of Stedman are the bare foundations and crumbling husks or rubble of very few of the town's buildings (including a cook shack and mess hall), many of which are scorched after an attempt by vandals to destroy what was left of Stedman. Old mining equipment, dysfunctional cars, burned crucibles, fuel tanks (described as partially buried), and glass bottles can be found abandoned across the settlement. The rusted remnants of the water tank, now covered in graffiti warning visitors not to enter any of the deadly mine entrances around the site, can also be seen at the bottom of the hill. Newspapers from soon after Stedman's desolation mention gems and minerals strewn across the dirt (including chrysocolla rocks around the camp. Nearly a mile of the Ludlow and Southern Railroad has been washed out and destroyed by a 1932 thunderstorm.
