= Cash in lieu of commodities =

Cash in lieu of commodities is cash provided to food program operators (e.g., elderly nutrition programs, child care food programs, and some school food programs) instead of mandated commodity assistance. Meal program operators receive funding instead of commodities to buy whatever foods they need to operate their meal service programs.

== See also ==
- Block grant
