= End of the Road =

End of the Road or The End of the Road may refer to:

== Film ==
- The End of the Road (1919 film), an American silent drama
- The End of the Road (1936 film), a British musical
- End of the Road (1944 film), an American crime film
- The End of the Road (1954 film), a British drama
- End of the Road (1970 film), an American comedy drama
- The End of the Road (1976 film), a British documentary
- End of the Road (1993 film), a Taiwanese film featuring Ng Man-tat
- End of the Road (2022 film), an American crime thriller

== Music ==
- "End of the Road" (Boyz II Men song), 1992
- "End of the Road" (Jerry Lee Lewis song), 1956
- "End of the Road", a song by Dog Fashion Disco from Sweet Nothings, 2014
- "End of the Road", a song by Eddie Vedder from Into the Wild, 2007
- "End of the Road", a song by Infected Mushroom from Legend of the Black Shawarma, 2009
- "End of the Road", a song by Juice WRLD from Goodbye & Good Riddance, 2018
- "End of the Road", a song by Sentenced from The Funeral Album, 2005
- End of the Road Festival, an annual music festival in England
- End of the Road World Tour, a 2019–2023 concert tour by Kiss

== Television episodes ==
- "End of the Road" (Thunderbirds), 1965
- "End of the Road" (Torchwood), 2011
- "The End of the Road" (Preacher), 2017
- "The End of the Road", an episode of On the Yorkshire Buses, 2014

== Other uses ==
- The End of the Road, a 1958 novel by John Barth
- The End of the Road, a 1989 novel and radio show by Tom Bodett
- The End of the Road Show, a 1991–1992 British radio comedy series

== See also ==
- "It's the End of the Road", a 2006 song by Matt Goss
