= Hunger Prevention Act of 1988 =

United States Law

- Long title: An Act to amend the Temporary Emergency Food Assistance Act of 1983 to require the Secretary of Agriculture to make available additional types of commodities, to improve child nutrition and food stamp programs, to provide other hunger relief, and for other purposes.
- Enacted by: the 100th United States Congress
- Effective: September 19, 1988

Citations
- Public law: 100-435
- Statutes at Large: 102 Stat. 1645

Codification
- Acts amended: Temporary Emergency Food Assistance Act of 1983
- Titles amended: 7 U.S.C.: Agriculture
- U.S.C. sections amended: 7 U.S.C. ch. 51 § 2011 et seq.

Legislative history
- Introduced in the Senate as S. 2560 by Patrick Leahy (D–VT) on June 23, 1988; Committee consideration by Senate Agriculture, Nutrition, and Forestry; Passed the Senate on July 26, 1988 (90-7); Passed the House on August 11, 1988 (passed voice vote) with amendment; Senate agreed to House amendment on August 11, 1988 (agreed voice vote); Signed into law by President Ronald Reagan on September 19, 1988

The Hunger Prevention Act of 1988 (P.L. 100-435) amended the Temporary Emergency Food Assistance Act of 1983 (P.L. 98-8) to require the United States Department of Agriculture (USDA) to make additional types of commodities available for the Temporary Emergency Food Assistance Program (TEFAP), to improve the child nutrition and food stamp programs, and to provide other hunger relief.
