= Milo Randolph Perkins =

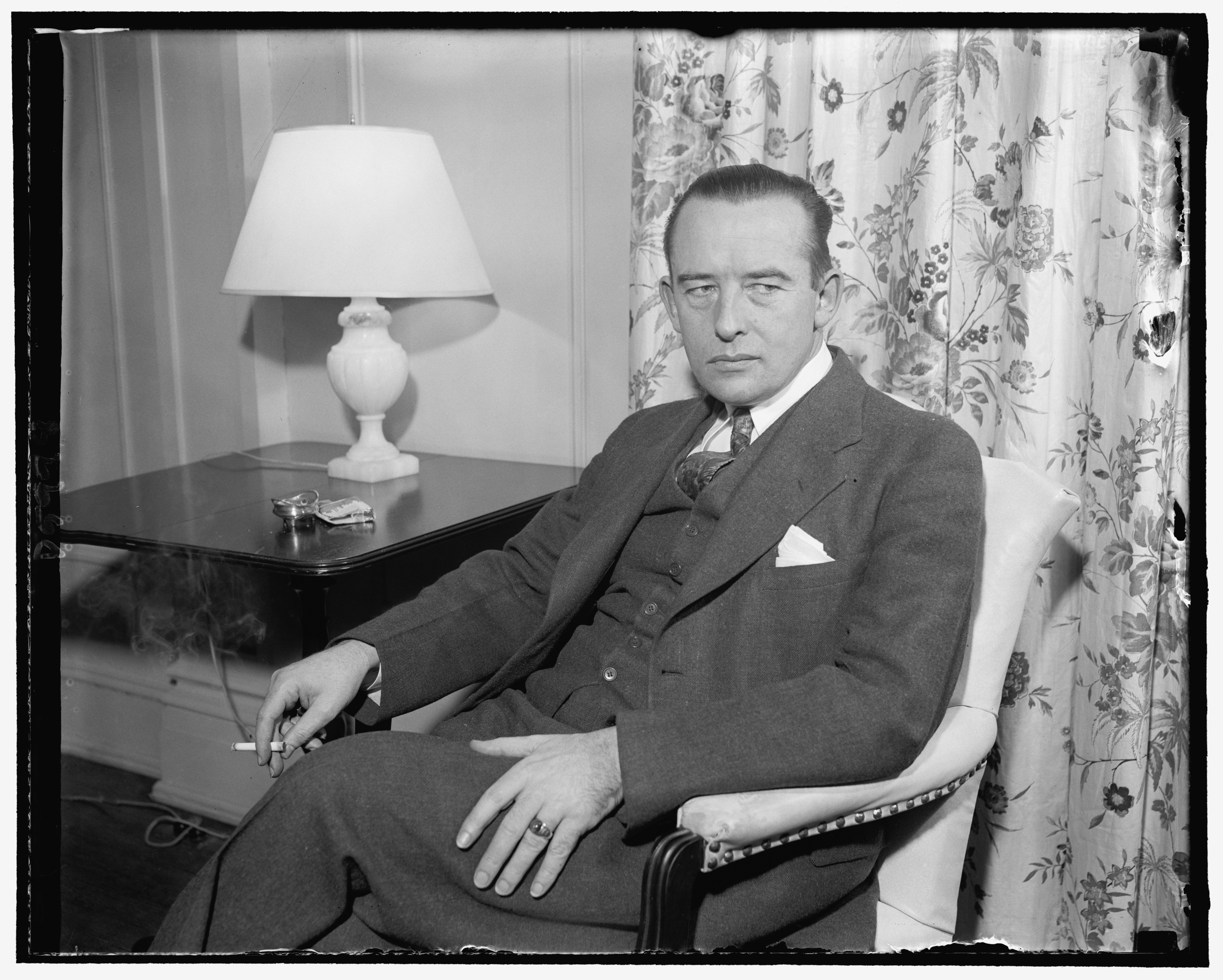
- Born: 1900
- Died: 1972 (aged 71–72)
- Occupation: Economist

Milo Randolph Perkins (1900–1972) was an American economic expert working for the Department of Agriculture in Washington, DC. He was the first administrator for the First Food Stamp Program (FSP) (May 16, 1939 – Spring 1943).

== Professional life ==
Born in Missouri, Milo Perkins became a successful businessman in Houston, Texas, launching the ‘King-Perkins-Bag Company’ in 1917 for the production of burlap bags. In 1935 or 1936 he was called to Washington, D.C. to become aide to Henry Wallace, who was the 11th US Secretary of Agriculture (1933–1940).

In a 1939 publication, Perkins was titled as the “President of the Federal Surplus Commodities Corporation”, an agency of the U.S. Department of Agriculture. To Perkins’ responsibilities belonged the ministerial exportation policy to stabilize the internal markets and to secure financial returns from the surpluses through exports. At this time, the United States was member of several ‘state cartels’ for international commodity regulation e.g. in the International Wheat Agreement (since 1933). In 1944, Perkins rejected the project of leftist Progressivists to ban all cartels, nationally and internationally.

In 1942, Perkins was featured as one of the prominent "young New Dealers" along with Francis Biddle, Archibald Macleish and Abe Fortas. He also was said to be "now top war and postwar planner“ on the American side of World War II. In 1944. he had resigned from his last official post in Washington, being ‘Executive Director of the Board of Economic Warfare’. Then he was “consultant to several business firms on foreign trade”.

In later years, Perkins became an adviser in questions of economic development e.g. for Venezuela.

== Private life ==
Perkins lived for long in Montgomery, MD near Washington, DC. He was married with the former Tharon Kidd (1902-1976). They had two sons, who both died during World War II. Milo and Tharon founded an azalea garden in Washington to commemorate them.

== Bibliography (in selection) ==
- Report of the associate administrator of the Agricultural Adjustment Administration, in charge of the Division of Marketing and Marketing Agreements, and the president of the Federal Surplus. Washington D.C 1939), U.S. G.P.O. Online available under http://worldcatlibraries.org/wcpa/oclc/14986522.
- Cartels. What shall we do about them? In: Harper' Magazine 189 (1944), 11 (Nov.), p. 570-578.German economic policies and the German economists. Washington. 1942).
- ''The azalea handbook (as a co-author with: Coe, Frederick W. et alii). Baltimore MD 1952: Monumental Print Co. Online available under http://worldcatlibraries.org/wcpa/oclc/676825947.
- Por el desarrollo y estabilidad de Venezuela : principios de acción. Caracas 1952: BCV Banco Central de Venezuela. Online available under http://worldcatlibraries.org/wcpa/oclc/838951564.
