= Reward, California =

Reward, California may refer to:

- Reward, Inyo County, California
- Reward, Kern County, California
