= Entitlement reform =

In the United States, entitlement reform may refer to:

- Social Security reform
- reforms to other social programs, such as Medicare, Medicaid, and food stamps (Supplemental Nutrition Assistance Program)

== See also ==
- Entitlement (disambiguation)
