= Old Pete Mine =

Abandoned mine in Ragtown, California, USA

Coordinates: 34°40′52″N 116°9′3″W

- The Old Pete Mine on a map of California.
- Location: California
- Products: Gold, Silver, Copper, Lead
- Opened: 1932
- Active: 1932–1940
- Closed: 1940

The Old Pete Mine, or Yim-Wheelock Mine, is an abandoned mine in Ragtown, California, in the Stedman-Rochester-Buckeye Mining District, and in the Kelso Dunes Wilderness Area, at an elevation of 2,080 feet above sea level. The Old Pete Mine produced gold, silver, copper, and lead.

The Old Pete Mine is composed of three claims with a combined area of 60 acres. It operated from 1932 to 1940. There were surface and underground mining operations.

== Geology ==
The Old Pete Mine's ore deposit was approximately 50 feet thick and produced 0.81 ounces of gold extracted per ton of rock. The ore deposit was hosted primarily in dacite, as well as andesite and sedimentary breccia.

Although the Old Pete Mine only exploited gold, silver, copper, and lead, other minerals such as mimetite and willemite could also be found in the region.
