= Electronic benefit transfer =

Form of U.S. state assistance

SNAP Allotment Logic & Parameters
Core Program Metrics (FY 2027)
- Max Monthly Allotment (Household of 4): $1,023
- Max Monthly Allotment (Household of 1): $306
- Minimum Monthly Benefit: $25
- Primary Core Networks: Quest Network, State-specific infrastructure (e.g., Link, CalFresh)

Net Income Deductions Pipeline
- Earned Income Check: Gross monthly employment income is immediately reduced by 20% to incentivize active employment.
- Standard Deductions: A fixed reduction subtracted automatically based on family size (e.g., baseline credit for 1–3 people).
- Excess Shelter Deduction: Shelter costs exceeding 50% of the remaining adjusted income are deducted (capped unless elderly/disabled).

The 30% Expected Contribution Math
- SNAP assumes families should spend a baseline portion of their net cash flow on food. The card load reflects this deficit: Monthly Allotment = Max Allotment - (Net Monthly Income × 0.30)  (Final payouts round down to the nearest whole dollar) • Note on Thresholds: If the resulting allotment lands below the $25 minimum safety threshold for a 1–2 person family, the flat baseline rate is assigned instead.

Restricted vs. Permitted Transactions
- Eligible Items: Breads, cereals, fruits, vegetables, meats, fish, poultry, dairy, and seeds/plants producing food.
- Absolute Disqualifiers: Beer, wine, liquor, tobacco, vitamins, medicines, hot prepared foods ready for immediate consumption, and nonfood items (pet food, soap, cosmetics).

Official Portal
- USDA FNS SNAP Hub

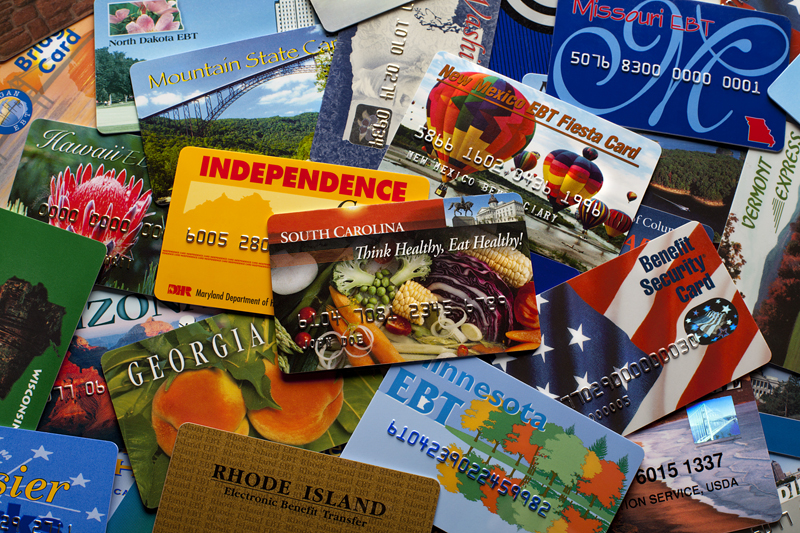
EBT cards from several states

Electronic benefit transfer (EBT) is an electronic system used in the United States that allows state welfare departments to issue benefits via a magnetically encoded payment card. It reached nationwide operations in 2004.

Benefits provided via EBT are of two types: food and cash. Food benefits are federally authorized benefits that can be used only to purchase food and non-alcoholic beverages. Food benefits are distributed through the Supplemental Nutrition Assistance Program (SNAP), formerly the Food Stamp Program, and the WIC program (Special Supplemental Nutrition Program for Women, Infants, and Children). Cash benefits include state general assistance, Temporary Assistance for Needy Families (TANF) benefits, and refugee benefits. The average monthly EBT disbursement for SNAP is $211.45 per participant as of 2023.

== History ==
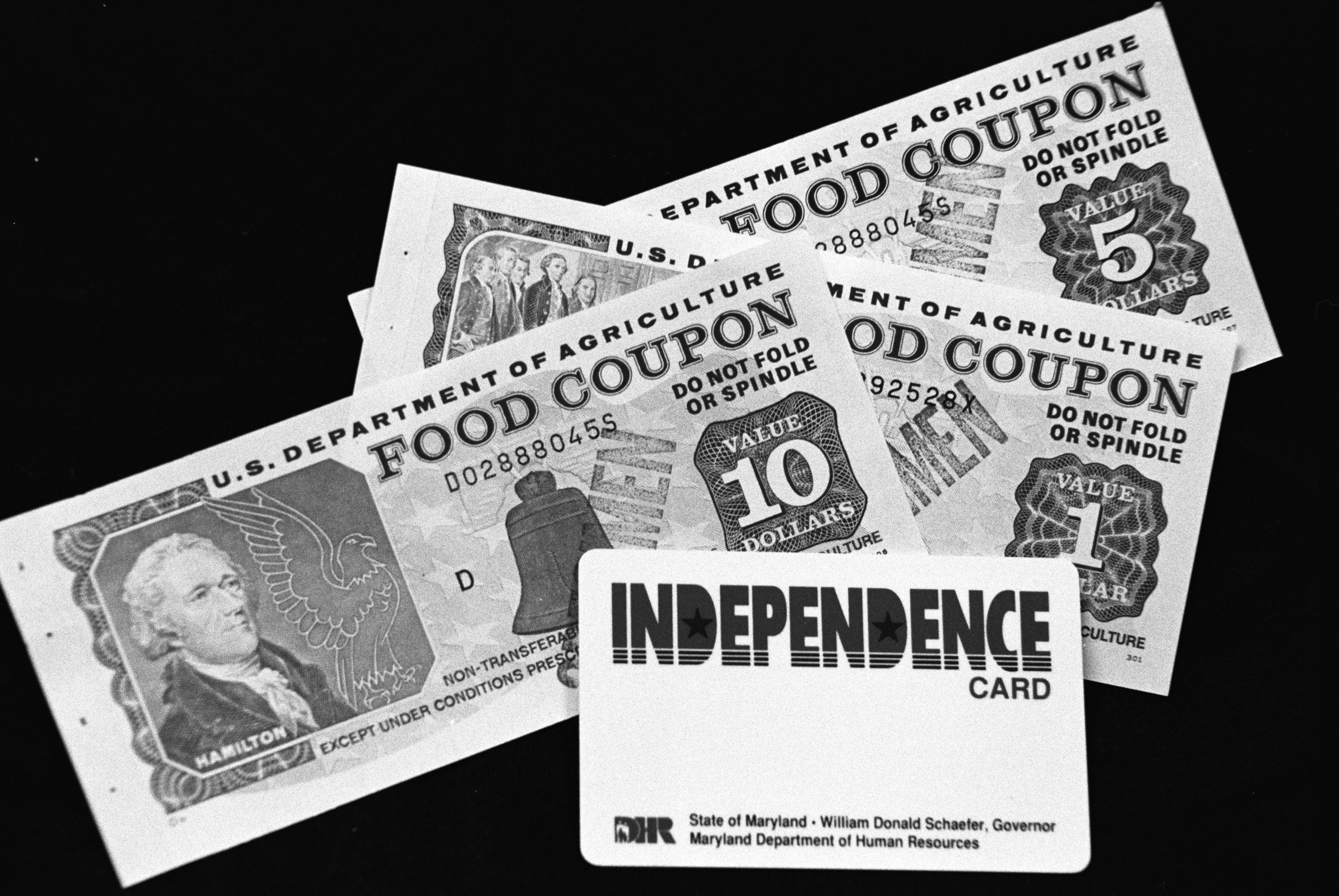
Traditional paper food stamps with an early EBT card

Before the introduction of electronic benefit transfer (EBT), government benefit programs primarily relied on paper-based methods. The Food Stamp Program (FSP), for example, utilized color-coded paper coupons ("stamps") that were redeemable at authorized retailers. Other programs, such as Aid to Families with Dependent Children (AFDC) and Temporary Assistance for Needy Families (TANF), typically distributed benefits through mailed checks. These systems presented numerous challenges, including logistical complexities associated with printing, distributing, and processing paper documents, along with increased vulnerability to fraud, theft, and counterfeiting, all resulting in significant administrative costs.

The development of EBT began with pilot programs in the 1980s. In 1984, Reading, Pennsylvania, piloted the first program that used an EBT card for food stamp benefits. This initial experiment aimed to assess the feasibility and potential advantages of transitioning to an electronic system for the delivery of benefits. The Hunger Prevention Act of 1988 provided legislative authorization for further pilot projects to evaluate the use of benefit cards and automated systems. This exploratory phase continued with the Mickey Leland Memorial Domestic Hunger Relief Act of 1990, which formally recognized EBT as a viable alternative to paper-based methods and authorized further demonstration projects.

The 1990s witnessed growing momentum toward nationwide EBT implementation. The Conference Report accompanying the Omnibus Budget Reconciliation Act of 1993 expressed strong federal support for state-level EBT development. Soon after, the Personal Responsibility and Work Opportunity Reconciliation Act of 1996 (PRWORA) was passed, which made many significant changes to the US welfare system. One of the changes mandated that all states implement EBT systems by October 1, 2002, dramatically accelerating the shift from paper to electronic benefit distribution.

State agencies, private sector contractors, banks, and retailers collaborated to develop the necessary technological infrastructure, such as card processing networks and point-of-sale terminals, that could process the EBT card as a form of payment. To ensure the interoperability and portability of benefits across state lines, the Electronic Benefit Transfer Interoperability and Portability Act of 2000 established national standards for electronic benefit transactions. Puerto Rico, which transitioned to a block grant program (the Nutrition Assistance Program) in 1982, was exempted from these interoperability standards.

The Farm Security and Rural Investment Act of 2002 further broadened the application of EBT by allowing group homes and institutions to directly redeem benefits electronically. By 2004, all U.S. states, territories, and the District of Columbia had implemented statewide EBT systems for administering SNAP benefits (the successor to the FSP).

The 2008 Farm Bill (Food, Conservation, and Energy Act of 2008) formally changed the name of the Food Stamp Program to the Supplemental Nutrition Assistance Program (SNAP) and codified EBT as the standard method of benefit issuance. This legislation removed all references to "stamps" or "coupons" from federal law, replacing them with "cards" or "EBT," thereby cementing the shift to electronic benefit delivery. The 2008 Farm Bill also addressed issues such as transaction fees and established programs to incentivize the purchase of healthy foods using SNAP benefits.

The Agricultural Act of 2014 enacted several SNAP-related changes impacting EBT. The law expanded retailer eligibility to include entities serving elderly and disabled individuals and direct-marketing agricultural producers, enabling home delivery pilot programs and direct-to-consumer sales. Other EBT-related provisions included restrictions on using SNAP for bottle/can refunds, mandates for retailer-funded EBT infrastructure (with exceptions), elimination of manual vouchers (except in emergencies), requirements for electronic sales restriction enforcement, expanded retailer approval based on food access, USDA oversight of excessive card replacements, and reporting requirements for state-operated restaurant meals programs for vulnerable populations.

The 2018 Farm Bill authorized the USDA's Food and Nutrition Service (FNS) to conduct a mobile payment pilot for EBT in five states. In March 2023, the FNS announced the selection of Illinois, Louisiana, Massachusetts, Missouri, and Oklahoma for the pilot, enabling SNAP recipients in these states to use mobile payment technologies as an alternative to physical EBT cards.

In 2023, the payment industry began collaborating to revise the ISO standard governing EBT cards to enable the integration of EMV chip technology. This security enhancement is designed to mitigate the risk of fraud, particularly skimming attacks. In 2025, California and Oklahoma are slated to be the first states to implement this updated standard, transitioning to EBT cards equipped with EMV chip technology.

=== Modernization ===
Since 2025, select states have begun issuing new cards with newer entry methods, such as EMV contact (chip) and EMV contactless (tap) technology.

State	EMV Contactless	EMV Contact	Citation
Alabama	No	Yes	
California	Yes	Yes	
Maryland	Yes	Yes	
Massachusetts	Yes	Yes	
Michigan	Yes	Yes	
Oklahoma	No	Yes	
Virginia	Yes	Yes	

== Usage ==
Through EBT, a recipient uses their EBT card at participating retailers to purchase food items authorized by the USDA's SNAP program. Cash benefits may be used to purchase any item at a participating retailer, as well as to obtain cash-back or make a cash withdrawal from a participating ATM.

State agencies work with contractors to procure their own EBT systems for delivery of SNAP and other state-administered benefit programs. In the United States, all SNAP benefits are now being issued via EBT.

For example, recipients apply for their benefits in the usual way, by filling out a form at their local food stamp office or online. Once eligibility and level of benefits have been determined, information is transferred to the state's EBT contractor. Once they are approved for benefits, an account is established in the recipient's name, and their SNAP benefits are deposited electronically in this account each month. A plastic debit card is issued and a personal identification number (PIN) is assigned or chosen by the recipient to control access to their account.

All states have systems that use magnetic stripe cards and "online" authorization of transactions, with the additional options of inserting or tapping the card also being available for some cardholders. When paying for groceries, the SNAP customer's card is run through an electronic reader or a point of sale terminal (POS), and the recipient enters the PIN to access the food stamp account. Then, electronically, the processor verifies the PIN and the account balance, and sends an authorization or denial back to the retailer. The recipient's account is then debited for the amount of the purchase, and the retailer's account is credited. No physical money changes hands. Payment is made to the retailer through an ACH settlement process at the end of the business day. Most states' online EBT systems are interoperable through the Quest network, which is sponsored by the Electronic Benefits and Services Council (formerly the EBT Council) of NACHA.

Many states stagger the issuing of benefits to EBT SNAP accounts, with the particular day of the month determined for each recipient based on the case number, Social Security number, or date of birth. The states of Alaska, Idaho, Nevada, North Dakota, Oklahoma, Vermont, along with Guam and the US Virgin Islands, credit accounts on the first of the month to all recipients, New Hampshire credits on the 5th, and South Dakota on the 10th.

== Taxation ==
It is illegal for anyone to charge sales tax, surcharges or card processing fees from an EBT SNAP account, according to federal law and USDA SNAP Guidelines. New state and federal law grants new provisions to law enforcement and state agencies to investigate the criminal use, including taxation on EBT purchases, of state and federal benefits.
