= Entitlement =

Entitled or Entitlement may refer to:

== Social sciences and philosophy ==
- Entitlement (fair division)
- Entitlement (psychology)
- Entitlement commodities
- Entitlement program
- Entitlement theory

== Arts and entertainment ==
=== Television ===
- "Entitled" (Law & Order: Special Victims Unit) (February 2000)
- Entitled (TV series), 2023 British comedy drama series
- Entitled, the working title of the 2021 Australian series Fisk

=== Other uses in arts and entertainment ===
- Entitled (album) (2016), the second studio album by American rapper Torae
- Entitled: The Rise and Fall of the House of York, an unauthorised biography of Andrew Mountbatten-Windsor and Sarah Ferguson

== See also ==
- Entitlement reform (disambiguation)
- I'm entitled to my opinion – Informal fallacy
