= Commodity Assistance Program =

U.S. federal aid program

In United States agricultural law, Commodity Assistance Program is term used by appropriators to refer to a variety of domestic programs receiving food in the form of USDA supplied commodities. The term was formalized for the first time in FY1996 appropriations law (P.L. 104–37, October 21, 1995) to refer to the consolidation for funding purposes of three commodity donation programs that are authorized under two separate statutes: the Emergency Food Assistance Program (EFAP), Soup Kitchen-Food Bank Program, and the Commodity Supplemental Food Program (CSFP).

Entitlement commodities are food commodities purchased by the USDA for the purpose of meeting legislatively specified rates of commodity assistance for various food assistance programs (e.g., school lunches). These commodities may be in government holdings as a result of agricultural surplus removal or price support activities carried out under a variety of agriculture laws, but more commonly they are items purchased to meet food program needs.

== See also ==
- Cash in lieu of commodities
