= Bonus commodities =

Bonus commodities from the agricultural perspective, are commodities donated to domestic feeding programs that USDA acquires for unexpected surplus removal reasons or because the Commodity Credit Corporation (CCC) holdings acquired under its price support programs are not needed for other purposes, or are in danger of waste or spoilage. For example, if meat prices fall, USDA may buy beef and donate it to the National School Lunch Program, or if the CCC is holding an excess of cornmeal that is in danger of spoiling, it might donate this to the Emergency Food Assistance Program (EFAP/TEFAP). From the food program perspective, these are commodities that are donated in addition to the commodities that must be provided under mandatory requirements in food program statutes.
