= Offer versus serve =

Offer versus serve refers to the option children in the United States may be given to refuse up to two items offered as part of a federally subsidized school lunch or breakfast without the meal service operation losing the federal reimbursement for the meal. It was enacted to reduce plate waste, which, some contended, was exacerbated by forcing children to take items they did not want as part of a meal in order for the meal to qualify for a federal subsidy.

== See also ==
- National School Lunch Act
- School meal
