= Rafael Village, California =

Rafael Village
- Former unincorporated community District of Novato
- Location in California
- Coordinates: 38°04′08″N 122°32′59″W
- Country: United States
- State: California
- County: Marin County
- City: Novato
- Elevation: 49 ft (15 m)

Rafael Village (formerly, Rafael) is a former unincorporated community now incorporated in Novato in Marin County, California. It lies at an elevation of 49 feet (15 m).
