= Riccas Corner, California =

Riccas Corner
- Unincorporated community
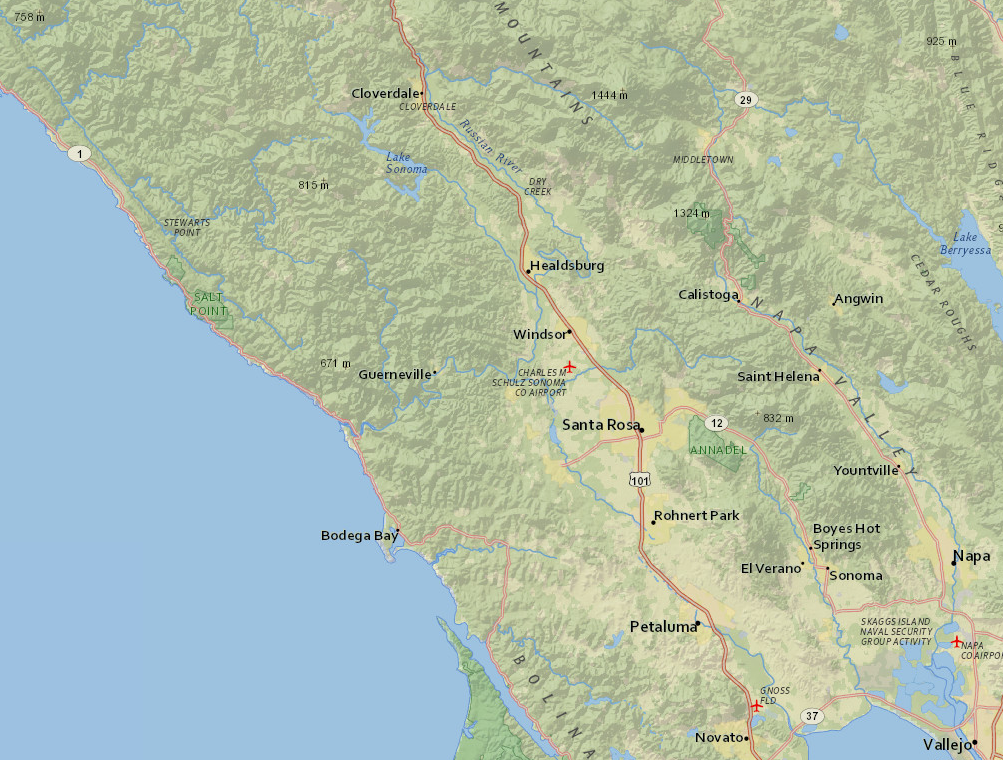
- Location within Sonoma County Location within California Location within the United States
- Coordinates: 38°25′24″N 122°47′17.5″W
- Country: United States
- State: California
- County: Sonoma County
- Elevation: 95 ft (29 m)

Population
  - Total: 27,234
- Time zone: UTC-8 (Pacific Standard Time)
  - Summer (DST): UTC-7 (Pacific Daylight Time)
- ZIP Code: 95401
- Area code: 707
- GNIS FID: 231524

Riccas Corner is an unincorporated community in Sonoma County, California. The population is 27,234.
