= Rainbow, Placer County, California =

Unincorporated community in California, United States

Rainbow
- Unincorporated community
- Location in California Rainbow (the United States)
- Coordinates: 39°18′37″N 120°30′31″W
- Country: United States
- State: California
- County: Placer County
- Elevation: 5,781 ft (1,762 m)

Rainbow is an unincorporated community in Placer County, California. Rainbow is located 1.5 miles (2.4 km) east of Cisco Grove. It lies at an elevation of 5781 feet (1762 m).

Rainbow is named for the Rainbow Lodge, a tavern built on US 40 at the site in 1927. The lodge soon became a service stop on the highway and a recreational destination, with a small rope-pulled ski lift.
