= The Reward (opera) =

The Reward (Polish: Nadgroda) — Polish opera in 2 acts by Karol Kurpiński with libretto written by Ludwik Adam Dmuszewski. Its first performance took place on 24 December 1815 in Warsaw.

This opera was written "because of the desired arrival of the brightest Alexander I, Emperor and King of the newly resurrected Polish Kingdom" Its other titles are:

- The Reward, or The Resurrection of the Nation (Nagroda, czyli Wskrzeszenie narodu)
- The Brightest Guests, or The Reward (Najjaśniejsi goście, czyli Nagroda)
- The Reward, or the Resurrection of Polish Kingdom (Nagroda, czyli Wskrzeszenie Królestwa Polskiego)

An arrangement of the overture for piano was published in Tygodnik Muzyczny (1820 No.5). It appears to be the only part of the music to survive.

== Roles ==
- Podczaszy (The Cup-bearer), heir of the estate
- Ekonom (The Steward)
- Organista (The Organist)
- Justyna, his daughter
- Basia, her friend, a peasant
- Grzegorz, former steward
- Stanisław, his son, former soldier

Chorus:

- Goście z sąsiedztwa (Guests from the neighborhood)
- Wieśniacy (Villagers)

The scene is staged in Kraków.

- Act I: a village
- Act II: palace garden.

The action takes place on 10 November 1815.

== Music numbers ==
- Overture

Act I

- (?) Maidens chorus. «Cieszmy się, ciesmy w tej radosnej chwili» (Scene I)
- Dumka (Justyna). «Gdym przestała bydż dziecięciem» (Scene I)
- Duet (Justyna and Basia). «Nadziejo, droga nadziejo!» (Scene II)
- Polonaise (Basia). «Jak prawdziwa Krakowianka» (Scene III)
- Duet (Justyna and Stanisław). «Ach jak szczęśliwy był dzisiejszy ranek» (Scene VIII)
- Finale (Justyna, Stanisław, Basia, Ekonom, Organista, a group of villagers). «Niech żyje! niech żyje! niech żyje!» (Scene X)

Act II

- Mazurek (Organista). «Cieszmy się miłą nadzieją» (Scene I)
- (?) Chorus and krakowiaks. «Nasz sędziowy od Skalmierza» (Scene II)
- Cantata (text by Ludwik Osiński, music by Józef Elsner). «Jakaż radość weselnych rozwesela plemie?» (after the play)
