= The End of the Road Show =

British radio comedy series

- Genre: Comedy
- Running time: 30 minutes
- Country of origin: United Kingdom
- Language: English
- Home station: BBC Radio 4
- Starring: Nick Hancock; Neil Mullarkey; Tony Hawks; Rebecca Front; Regina Freedman
- Written by: Stewart Lee; Richard Herring; Armando Iannucci (script editor)
- Produced by: Sarah Smith
- Website: The End of the Road Show

The End of the Road Show is a 1991-2 UK radio comedy series, broadcast on BBC Radio 4.

The programme's comedian presenters would visit a different university town or city in the UK in each edition. The running joke was that the presenters were trying to entice young people away from BBC Radio One, a pop music station, to Radio Four, a conservative speech-based station. The title of the programme was derived from the Radio 1 Roadshow (in which the station's disc jockeys would tour Britain's seaside resorts each summer, presenting from a different town each day). The show, very much tongue-in-cheek, claimed that The End of the Road Show was "just like the Radio One roadshow. Except indoors, in the middle of winter, and with everyone sitting in rows".

The programme featured contemporary Radio One jingles, but with the sung word "one" in the original jingle replaced by a Radio Four continuity announcer speaking the word "four".

== Episodes ==
This table has the episodes of The End of the Road Show listed in it
No.	Recording location	Original release date
1	Newcastle Polytechnic	28 December 1991
2	Edinburgh	4 January 1992
3	Bristol	11 January 1992
4	Oxford	18 January 1992
