= Emergency Food Assistance and Soup Kitchen-Food Bank Program =

United States federal aid program

The Emergency Food Assistance and Soup Kitchen-Food Bank Program (EFAP-Soup Kitchens) provides United States Department of Agriculture (USDA) commodities to emergency feeding organizations to help with the food needs of low-income populations. It also authorizes grants to states to help with the state and local costs of transporting, storing, and distributing the commodities to the appropriate local agencies and organizations.

The program is authorized under the Emergency Food Assistance Act of 1983 (P.L. 98-92, as amended; 7 U.S.C. 7501 et seq.). In addition to authorizing funding to buy commodities, the program also requires specifically that $100 million of food stamp funds be used annually for that purpose. Eligible agencies include food banks, food pantries, soup kitchens, and public and private charitable agencies serving the poor. States determine the agencies eligible to participate and set low-income standards for eligibility.
