= Karol Kurpiński =

Polish composer and conductor

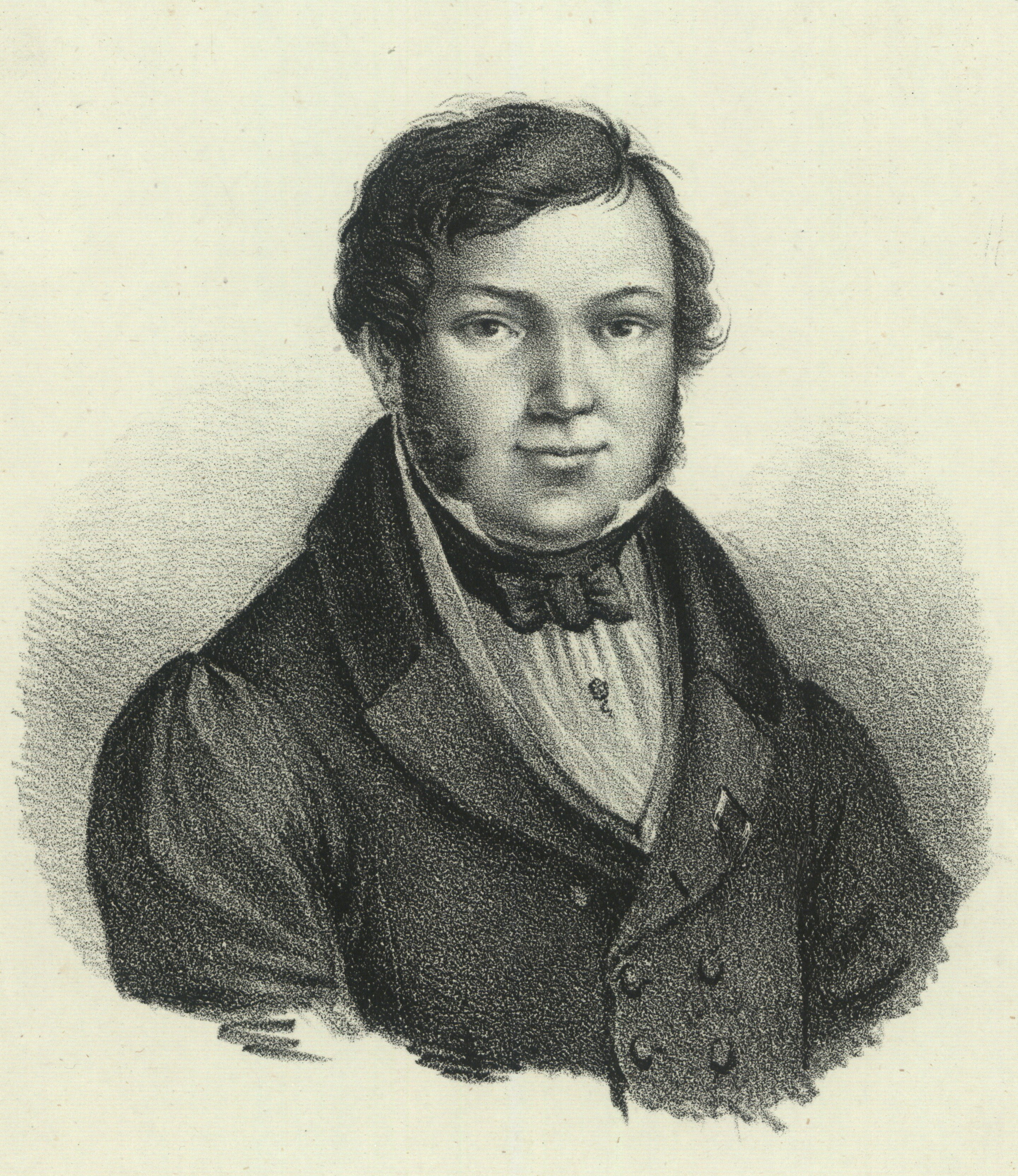
- Karol Kurpiński in 1850
- Born: Włoszakowice, Polish-Lithuanian Commonwealth
- Baptised: March 6, 1785
- Died: September 18, 1857 (aged 72); Warsaw, Congress Poland, Russian Empire
- Occupations: Conductor, Teacher
- Known for: National Theatre, Warsaw
- Spouse: Zofia Browska (1800-1879)
- Parents: Marcin Kurpiński (1744-1803); Franciszka Wańska

Karol Kazimierz Kurpiński (March 5, 1785 – September 18, 1857) was a Polish composer, conductor and pedagogue. He was a representative of late classicism and early romanticism as well as being a member of the Warsaw Society of Friends of Learning (Polish: Towarzystwo Warszawskie Przyjaciół Nauk, TWPN). He is also known for having composed the music to the 1831 patriotic song La Varsovienne with lyrics by Casimir Delavigne. He was also a mentor and an influence on young Chopin.

== Early life ==
Karol Kurpiński was born in Włoszakowice, Greater Poland, shortly before his baptism on 6 March 1785, probably 4 or 5 March. He was the sixth child Marcin Kurpiński (né Kurp), organist at the Church of the Holy Trinity in Włoszakowice, and Franciszka née Wańska, the daughter of the village sołtys and member of a prominent musical family in Poland. Marcin changed his ethnic family name Kurp to the noble-sounding Kurpiński around 1768.

Karol attended the village parish school while learning music theory, violin, and organ from his father. By the age of eight, he was able to stand in for his father as an organist on occasion. In 1797, at the age of 12, Karol became the organist at the Church of St. Andrew the Apostle in Sarnowa, Rawicz, where his maternal uncle Karol Wański was parish priest. Karol was also responsible for two choirs and two orchestras.

In 1800, Karol's maternal uncles Roch and Jan Wański—a professional cellist and a popular composer, respectively—arranged for him to travel to Moszków (now Huta, Ukraine), where Roch held a position in an orchestra under the supervision of starost Feliks Polanowski. The young Kurpiński played second violin in the orchestra and remained there until 1808 to continue his musical education. Roch Wański, though only five years Karol's senior, became a father figure for him during these years, and Polanowski often took him to opera productions in Lviv, about 90 kilometers to the north.

== Career ==
Kurpiński composed his first opera, Pygmalion, in 1808 at Moszków. In 1810 he settled in Warsaw. With the help of Józef Elsner, he became a conductor of the Warsaw Opera, a position he held until 1840. He taught music at several prominent schools including one he founded. In 1815 he became a member of many musical societies in Poland and abroad, including the Société des Enfants d'Apollon in Paris. He became Kapellmeister of the Polish royal chapel in 1819 and the same year received a lifetime achievement award for his services to music. In 1820 he founded and edited the first Polish music newsletter. He was decorated with the Order of Saint Stanislaus in 1823.

In 1829, together with Józef Elsner he was ordered by the authorities to write music for the coronation of Nicolas I of Russia for King of Poland. For this occasion Kurpiński composed Te deum. The work wasn't performed again until 2011.

Kurpiński was a romanticist and one of the most revered Polish composers before Chopin, whom he met in 1828. He helped to lay the foundations of a national style and prepared the ground for Polish music of the Romantic period, particularly Chopin. He contributed to the development of Polish opera, introducing new musical devices and achieving a novel mode of expression.

He died on September 18, 1857, in Warsaw, aged 72.

== Works, editions and recordings ==
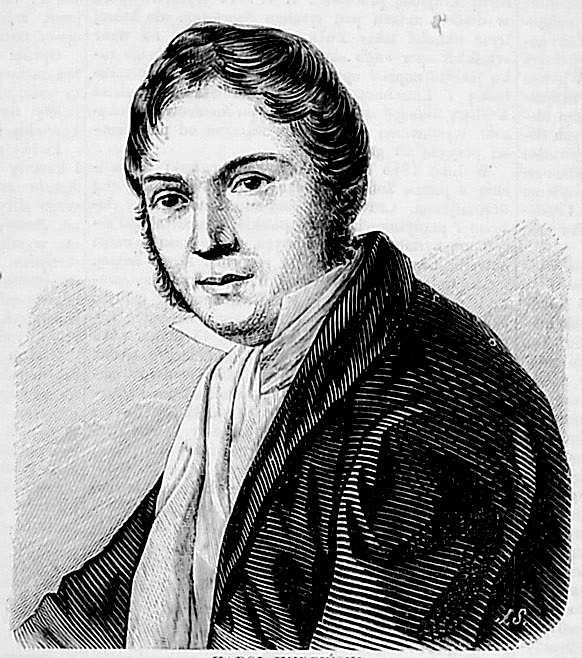
Karol Kurpiński

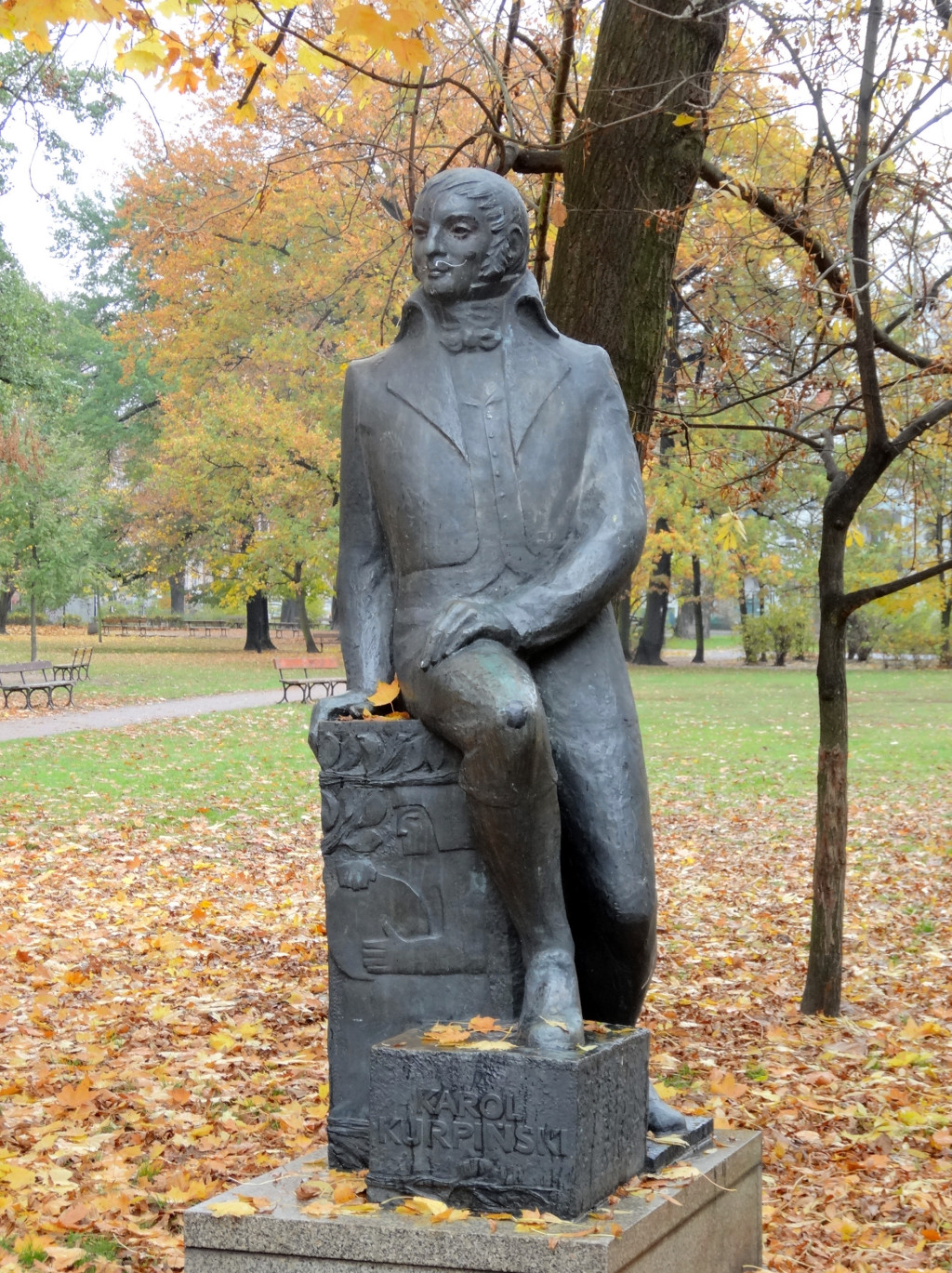
Karol Kurpiński monument in Bydgoszcz

=== Stage works ===
- Pygmalion, opera (c. 1800–08) (lost)
- The Palace of Lucifer, opera in 4 acts (1811)
- Mistress Marcin of the Harem, comic opera in 3 acts (1812)
- The Charlatan, or The Raising of the Dead, opera in 2 acts (1814)
- Jadwiga, Queen of Poland, opera in 3 acts (1814)
- The Reward, or the Revival of the Polish Kingdom, melodrama in 2 acts (1815)
- Superstition, or Krakovians and Mountaineers, or The new Krakovians, opera in 3 acts (1816)
- Jan Kochanowski at Czarny Las, opera comique in 2 acts (1817)
- Czaromysl the Slav Prince, opera in 1 act (1818)
- Terpsichore's New Colony on the Vistula, ballet (1818)
- The Castle of Czorsztyn, or Bojomir and Wanda, opera in 2 acts (1819) Libretto: Józef Wawrzyniec Krasiński z Radziejowic (recording by Polska Orkiestra Sinfonia Iuventus – conducted Michał Niedziałek, with soloists Aleksandra Orłowska-Jabłońska, Hubert Stolarski, Jadwiga Niebelska, Tomasz Raff, Witold Żołądkiewicz Dux Records)
- Kalmora, or The Paternal Right of the Americans, melodrama in 2 acts (1820) libretto by Kazimierz Brodziński
- Mars and Flora, ballet in 1 act (1820)
- The Foresters of Kozienice, opera in 1 act (1821)
- The Three Graces, ballet (1822)
- Cecylia Piaseczynska, opera in 2 acts (1829)

=== Orchestral works ===
- Grand Symphony Imagining a Battle, or The Battle of Mozhaysk Op. 15.
- Grand Fugue on the Song "Poland has not perished yet", arranged for piano (1821)
- Potpourri, or Variations on National Themes, for piano and orchestra (1822)
- Clarinet Concerto in B-flat major, arranged for clarinet and piano (1950)

=== Chamber music ===
- Fantaisie en quatuor
- Trio, for clarinet, violin and cello
- Reverie over Wanda's tomb, for violin and piano (1820)
- Nocturne, for horn, bassoon and viola, Op. 16 (1823)
- Paysage Musical, for horn and bassoon, Op. 18 (1823)
- Cavatina, for trumpet or trombone and piano (1953)

=== Piano music ===
- A Dreadful Dream (1820)
- Le reveil de J.J. Rousseau au printemps (1821)
- Nine variations (1821)
- Fantaisie for alto (1821)
- Fantaisie, Op. 10 (1823)
- Six Variations (1823)

=== Vocal works ===
==== Sacred ====
- Six Masses, including "Country Mass" (1821)
- Oratorio, for 4 voices, 2 trumpets, 2 trombones, double bass, timpani and organ,
- Te deum laudamus (1829).

==== Cantata ====
- Cantata on the Anniversary of Napoleon's Coronation (1810)
- Elegy on the Death of Tadeusz Kosciuszko (1819)
- Cantata on the Unveiling of the Copernicus Monument (1830)

==== Songs ====
- The Song of Warsaw (1831)
- The Song of the Lithuanian Legionaries (1831)
