= Lucifer's Palace =

Opera by Karol Kurpiński

Lucifer's Palace (Polish: Pałac Lucypera) — Polish opera in 4 acts by Karol Kurpiński. Libretto was written by Alojzy Żółkowski, based on Joseph-Marie Loaisel de Tréogate's play Le château du diable published in 1792 (another adaptation of this was Des Teufels Lustschloss by August von Kotzebue from 1801). The opera was staged for the first time on 9 November 1811 in Warsaw.

Parts of the libretto were published in Roczniki Teatru Narodowego 1811-1812. Though no part of the opera was published during Kurpiński's life, it has completely survived in full score.

== Roles ==
- Lancelot, a knight - bass/barytone
- Adelajda, his wife - soprano
- Gaweł, Lancelot's squire - bass
- Rządca (The Governor) or hrabia Magnus (Count Magnus) - bass/baryton
- Paź (The Page) - soprano
- Niewolnik (The Slave) or Habakuk - tenor
- Amanda or Róża - soprano
- Królowa (The Queen) - soprano
- Leida - soprano
- Emira - soprano
- Gospodyni oberzy (Tavern hostess) - soprano

Chorus: peasants, courtiers, servants.

== Plot ==
The opera takes place in the Middle Ages. Brave and noble knight Lancelot faces the intrigues of his newly married wife Adelajde's uncle, Count Magnus, who with a diabolical hoax tries to destroy the love of the young couple. Through many adventures Lancelot can be neither intimidated nor tempted to infidelity to wife.
