= Ragtown, California =

Ragtown
- Ghost town
- Location within the state of California Ragtown (the United States)
- Coordinates: 34°39′54″N 116°09′07″W
- Country: United States
- State: California
- County: San Bernardino
- Time zone: UTC-8 (Pacific (PST))
  - Summer (DST): UTC-7 (PDT)
- GNIS feature ID: 252961

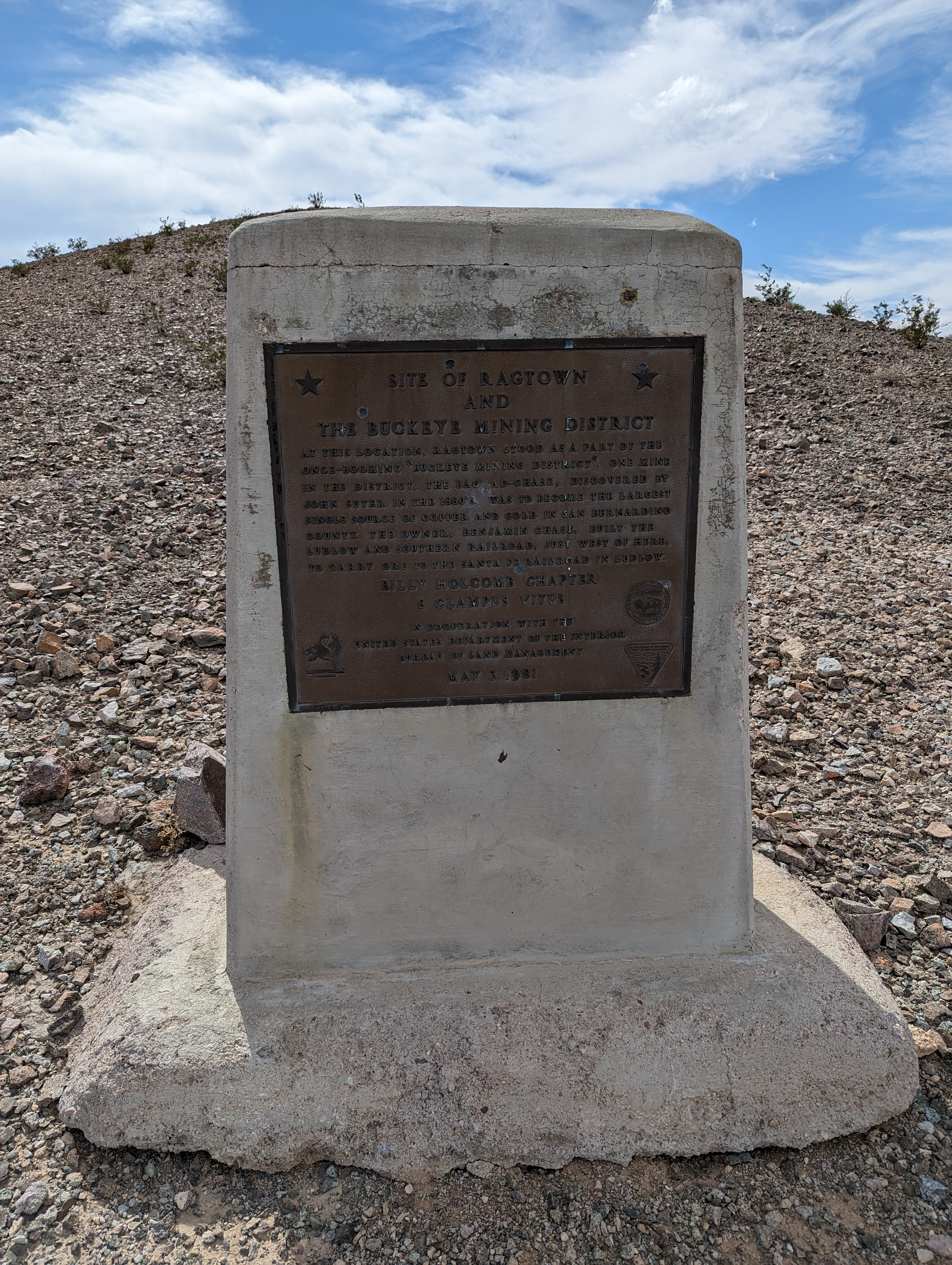
Dedicatory plaque at the site of Ragtown and the Buckeye Mining District

Ragtown was a mining town, now a ghost town, in the Mojave Desert, San Bernardino County, California, United States. John Sutter found gold in the Bagdad-Chase area in about 1898. Ragtown was also the site of the Old Pete Mine.

Ragtown, existed just north of Stedman, California (Stedman was established first, and Ragtown's development was closely related to Stedman's) on Bagdad Chase Road. Ragtown's name was derived from the many tents that served as its residents sleeping quarters, as well as its infamy as a red-light district, as a ragtown was another word for that.

Ragtown is classified as a cold desert under the Köppen climate classification.

== Abandonment ==
Little remains of Ragtown except a few building foundations, a trash midden, and a boulder-lined dirt road, as well as the Old Pete Mine.

A plaque in memory of this historical place is installed by E Clampus Vitus on May 3, 1981, about six miles south of Ludlow, California.

The plaque reads:

Site of Ragtown and the Buckeye Mining District

At this location, Ragtown stood as a part of the once-booming "Buckeye Mining District". One mine in the district, the Bagdad-Chase, discovered by John Suter in the 1880s, was to become the largest single source of copper and gold in San Bernardino County. The owner, Benjamin Chase, built the Ludlow and Southern Railroad, just west of here, to carry ore to the Santa Fe Railroad in Ludlow.
