= Temporary Emergency Food Assistance Act of 1983 =

United States Law

The Temporary Emergency Food Assistance Act of 1983 (TEFAA) (P.L. 98-8) was a supplemental appropriations act for FY 1983 that, among other things, explicitly authorized a discretionary commodity donation effort begun in 1981 by the USDA. The initial effort was limited to disposal of excess commodities held by the Commodity Credit Corporation (CCC) by donating them to states. This law also authorized funding to help states and local emergency feeding organizations with the storage and distribution costs of handling the commodities. This is the origin of the current Emergency Food Assistance Act of 1983 (P.L. 98-92, as amended; 7 U.S.C. 7501 et seq.).
