= Roads End, California =

Unincorporated community in California, United States

Coordinates: 35°55′36″N 118°29′57″W

Roads End is an unincorporated community in Tulare County, California, in the United States. In 2005, The Peter Lebeck Chapter 1866 of E Clampus Vitus placed a historical plaque at or near the site of historic Roads End. This is what the plaque said: PLAQUE READ:

In 1910 this was Camp 8 – the end of the road. From this uppermost camp a rough wagon track pushed one and one half miles up the river to where Southern California Edison Company constructed the intake for Kern River No. 3 Power Plant. In 1922, Earl and Lucille Pascoe started Pascoe’s Pack Station. By 1927 it was a year round operation and by 1934 boasted the Roads End Store, a Lodge and Guest cottages. Earl built up his packing business to 150 head of horses and mules and 12 or 13 packers and guides in the peak season. A 100 man Conservation Corps (CCC) Camp was brought in by the U. S. Forest Service in 1936 to extend the road north, to build the historic town of Johnsondale. The Pascoe’s retired in 1952 and sold to Mildred and Skeets Byers. In 1973 new owners Al & Frank Keegan added a restaurant. The last owners to operate the store and cottages were Mike and Marcia Burford. Forest Service Fire Patrolman John T. “Jack” Moore was a permanent fixture from 1944 to 1972. Jack and his wife, Loreen, lived and worked in the Guard Station at Roads End during an era when Rangers work, private lives, home and office melded into one. Thousands of forest visitors and natives benefited from his knowledge of the area and remember Ranger Jack Moore as a caregiver, rescuer, fire fighter and friend. Roads End Resort was a popular stop for visitors until July 2002 when the majority of the buildings were lost in a human caused fire called The McNally.

In cooperation with Sequoia National Forest, Southern California Edison & by Samuel Gregg George Chapter ECV. Dedicated September 25, 2005 Kern River Valley Historical Society Peter LeBeck Chapter #1866 E Clampus Vitus
