= Reward, Inyo County, California =

Unincorporated community in California, United States

Reward
- Ghost town
- Location in California Reward (the United States)
- Coordinates: 36°44′51″N 118°03′18″W
- Country: United States
- State: California
- County: Inyo
- Elevation: 3,865 ft (1,178 m)

Reward was a mining site in Inyo County, California, United States. It is located on the west side of the Inyo Mountains, 9.5 miles (15 km) north of Lone Pine, at an elevation of 3865 feet (1178 m).

A post office operated at Reward from 1900 to 1906. The town's name originates from a local mining company, Reward Consolidated Mining Co, who operated the gold and silver Eclipse Mine in 1878 at the site.
