= Emergency Food Assistance Act of 1983 =

United States Law

The Emergency Food Assistance Act of 1983 (P.L. 98-92) amended the original Temporary Emergency Food Assistance Act of 1983 (P.L. 98-8) to authorize multi-year funding and commodity donations from excess Commodity Credit Corporation (CCC) inventories of foodstuffs for food distribution by emergency feeding organizations serving the needy and homeless (7 U.S.C. 7501 et seq.). It subsequently was amended in the 1985 Farm Bill, 1988, 1990, 1996 and the 2002 farm bill under the 2002 farm bill (P.L. 107-171, Sec. 4126, Sec. 4204). This is the Emergency Food Assistance and Soup Kitchen-Food Bank Program.

The law authorizes funding through FY2007 to buy and donate commodities and to provide grants to cover the state and local costs of transporting, storing, and distributing these commodities to emergency feeding organizations, soup kitchens, and food banks serving low-income persons. In addition to discretionary funds authorized to be appropriated by this law, there is a requirement that $100 million of food stamp appropriations be used annually to buy commodities for emergency feeding organizations.
