= Bagdad, California =

- Ghost town
- Interactive map of Bagdad, California
- Coordinates: 34°34′58″N 115°52′32″W
- Country: United States
- State: California
- County: San Bernardino
- Founded: 1883
- Abandoned: 1970-72
- Elevation: 750 ft (230 m)
- Time zone: UTC-8 (PST)
  - Summer (DST): UTC-7 (PDT)
- ZIP code: 92304
- Area codes: 442/760
- FIPS code: 06-03456
- GNIS feature ID: 1660291

Bagdad is a ghost town in the Mojave Desert, in San Bernardino County, California.

== Geography ==
Bagdad is located along the historic U.S. Route 66, east of Barstow and Ludlow, and west of Amboy and Needles.

The town was founded in 1883 when the Atchison, Topeka and Santa Fe Railway line between Barstow and Needles was built. At this time, Bagdad provided services to the Orange Blossom Mine several miles to the north, and to the War Eagle Mine several miles to the south. In addition, a dirt track extended south past the War Eagle Mine into the Dale Mining District in the Pinto Mountains.

Bagdad was long a thriving town along the National Old Trails Road and the famous Route 66. It was bypassed by the opening of Interstate 40 to the north in 1973, and lost travelers' business and resident population.

The remaining buildings were razed in 1991, leaving little trace of the town.

Bagdad holds the record for the longest dry streak in United States history with 767 straight days without rain, from October 3, 1912, to November 8, 1914. It is to the south of the Granite Mountains and the Mojave National Preserve, and north of the Bullion Mountains.

A small airfield known as the Bagdad Intermediate Field was built south of the town, immediately south of Route 66. It was operational in 1932, with abandonment between 1954 and 1958. A small, red concrete pad that was formerly the base of the airway beacon tower is all that remains.

== Bagdad Café ==
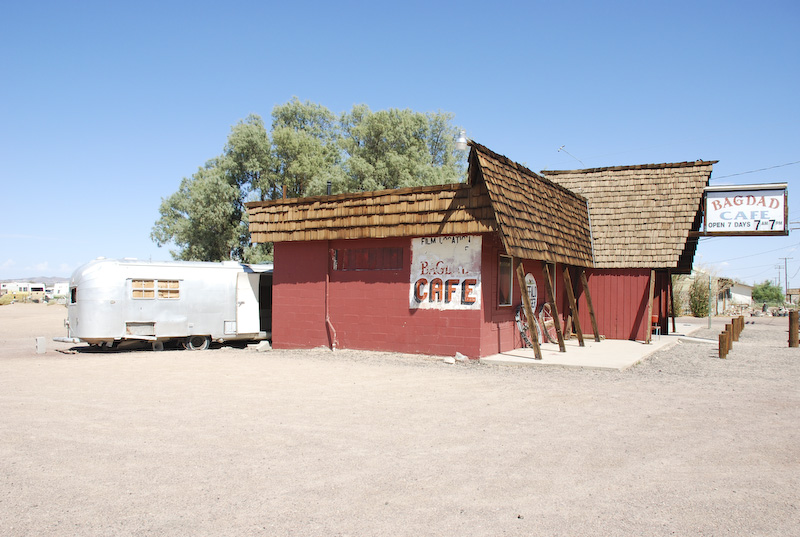
The "Bagdad Café", located in Newberry Springs, California

The town is known as the fictionalized setting of a novel and a motion picture called Bagdad Café.

The movie was shot at the Sidewinder Cafe in nearby Newberry Springs, which has since been renamed the "Bagdad Café."

In 1990, CBS ran a television series Bagdad Cafe, for two seasons.

== See also ==
- El Garces Hotel
- Kelso Depot, Restaurant and Employees Hotel
- Harvey House Railroad Depot

== Bibliography ==
- Alan Hensher, Ghost Towns of the Mojave Desert: A Concise and Illustrated Guide, California Classics Books, Los Angeles (1991) ISBN 978-1-879395-07-7
- Ghost Towns.com - Bagdad Webpage about Bagdad, CA with numerous photographs.
- Bagdad, California Brief history of Bagdad, CA.
