= List of ghost towns in California =

This is an incomplete list of ghost towns in California. Their abandonment was caused by multiple factors, such as the end of the California gold rush, the creation of new lakes, and the abandonment of formerly-used rail and motor routes.

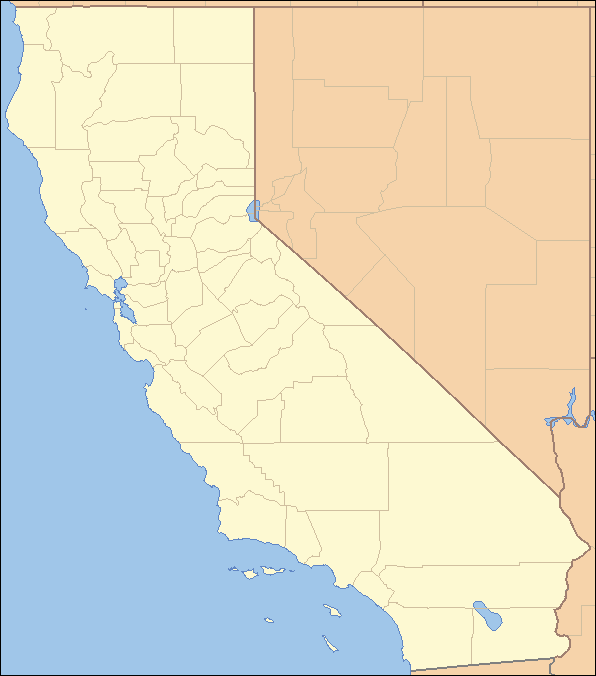

== Classification ==
=== Barren site ===
- Sites no longer in existence
- Sites that have been destroyed
- Only remnants of structures left
- Reverted to pasture

=== Neglected site ===
- Only rubble left
- Roofless building ruins
- Buildings or houses still standing, but majority are roofless

=== Abandoned site ===
- Building or houses still standing
- Buildings and houses all abandoned
- No population, except caretaker
- Site no longer in existence except for one or two buildings, for example old church, grocery store

=== Semiabandoned site ===
- Building or houses still standing
- Buildings and houses largely abandoned
- few residents
- many abandoned buildings
- Small population

== List ==
Town	Other names	County	Latitude/Longitude	Founded	Abandoned	Status	Remarks
Agua Fria		Mariposa	37°29′06″N 120°01′13″W	1850	1862	Barren	Truly was abandoned after a fire burnt down the town in 1866.
Agua Mansa		San Bernardino	34°02′31″N 117°21′50″W	1853	After 1862	Barren	Declined slowly after the Great Flood of 1862.
Alma	Lexington	Santa Clara	37°10′48″N 121°58′48″W	1861	1952	Submerged	Already declined to less than 100 residents, Alma was demolished during the 1952 construction of the James J. Lenihan Dam. Currently, the few remaining structures are underneath the Lexington Reservoir and can only be seen during low water levels.
Amboy		San Bernardino	34°33′25″N 115°44′42″W	1858	N/A	Semi-abandoned	declined slowly from the opening of Interstate 40
Ashford Mill		Inyo	35°55′08″N 116°41′05″W	1914	unknown	Neglected	
Ash Hill		San Bernardino	34°42′25″N 116°03′18″W	unknown	unknown	Neglected	
Asphalto	La Brea	Kern	35°18′17″N 119°36′03″W	Before 1893	1932	Barren	
Atolia		San Bernardino	35°18′53″N 117°36′33″W	1906	After 1965	Abandoned	
Bagdad		San Bernardino	34°34′58″N 115°52′32″W	1883	1973	Barren	Abandoned due to opening of Interstate 40
Bagby		Mariposa	37°36′39″N 120°08′04″W	c.1850	abt. 1966	Inundated	
Ballarat		Inyo	36°02′52″N 117°13′24″W	1897	1968	Neglected	The Manson Family left graffiti here. The town became abandoned after its sole resident, who had been living there alone for five decades, died
Beeks Place		Orange	33°49′14″N 117°38′20″W	Before 1940	unknown	Abandoned	
Belleville		San Bernardino	34°18′4″N 116°53′3″W	1860	Before 1900	Abandoned	Slowly declined after gold deposits in the region dried up
Ben Hur		Mariposa	37°21′06″N 119°57′28″W	1859	2019?	Semi-abandoned	Property sold in 2019. Unclear if still inhabited.
Bennettville	Tioga	Mono	37°56′15″N 119°15′38″W	1860	1890	Abandoned	Abandoned after not enough silver was found in the region
Bend City		Inyo	36°49′09″N 118°07′50″W	1863	After 1872	Abandoned	the 1872 Owens Valley Earthquake caused the Owens River to flow away from the town, driving the last remaining residents out
Bestville		Siskiyou	41°18′03″N 123°08′35″W	1850	aft. 1854	Barren	
Blue Mountain City		Calaveras	38.37080°N 120.36642°W	1863	aft. 1864	Barren	
Bodie		Mono	38°12′44″N 119°00′44″W	1876	N/A	Semiabandoned	Declined slowly from mining profits decreasing since 1914
Branson City	Branson	San Diego	33°04′41″N 116°37′02″W	1870	unknown	Abandoned	Abandoned due to not being able to compete with nearby Julian
Briceburg		Mariposa	37°36′18″N 119°58′01″W	1926	N/A	Semiabandoned	
Bridgeport		Mariposa	37°26′00″N 120°00′16″W	c.1852	N/A	Semiabandoned	
Cadiz		San Bernardino	34°31′12″N 115°30′46″W	1883	c.1950s	Neglected	
Calico		San Bernardino	34°56′56″N 116°51′51″W	1881	1907	Abandoned	Abandoned due to an end to borax mining in the region
Camanche	Clay's Bar	Calaveras	38°12′48″N 120°56′07″W	Before 1849	After 1962	Submerged	Inundated by Camanche Reservoir
Cañon City		Trinity	40°49′53″N 123°03′10″W	1851	1891	Barren	
Carnegie/Tesla		San Joaquin	37°37′46″N 121°31′41″W	1902	1915	Neglected	Known as Tesla at first. Site of a coal mine and eventually brick-making factories. Slowly declined after a flood in 1911 destroyed many roads and buildings as well.
Carson Hill	Slumgullion	Calaveras	38°01′42″N 120°30′24″W	Before 1853	1935	Abandoned	
Cat Town		Mariposa	37°38′40″N 120°05′22″W	c. 1850s	c.1850s	Barren	Gold Rush placer mining camp in Solomon Gulch
Cement		Solano	38°17′34″N 121°59′46″W	1902	1927	Neglected	Slowly declined after limestone deposits in the region were depleted.
Cerro Gordo		Inyo	36°32.2626′N 117°47.70186′W	1866	N/A	Semiabandoned	One man has been living here since 2020, after everyone else left.
Chinquapin	Chincapin	Mariposa	37°39′00″N 119°42′19″W	1882	N/A	Semiabandoned	Still used as a rest stop and ranger station within Yosemite National Park
Chloride City		Inyo	36°42′24″N 116°52′56″W	1905	bef.1908	Neglected	No longer appears on USGS maps by 1908. Accompanying Chloride Spring also served as its own, small townsite.
Chrysopolis		Inyo	36°57′38″N 118°11′48″W	1863	1910	Neglected	Abandoned after a mining boom in the region started in 1900, it went away.
Coleman City	Emily City	San Diego	33°05′10″N 116°38′42″W	1870	unknown	Abandoned	Abandoned after depletion of gold deposits in the region. 2 structures still stood there as of 1903 according to USGS.
Coso	Granite Springs	Inyo	36°10′36″N 117°38′49″W	1860	aft. 1913	Barren	Town still extant in 1913.
Cox & Clark Trading Post		Kings	35°58′08″N 119°56′21″W	1870	bef. 1914	Barren	Does not appear on 1914 USGS map.
Cuyamaca City	’Ekwiiyemak	San Diego	32°59′05″N 116°34′15″W	1887	1906	Abandoned	
Deadwood		Placer	39°04′50″N 120°41′22″W	1852	between 1938-1952	Abandoned	Disappears from USGS maps between those years. Cemetery remains.
Deadwood		Trinity	40°43′10″N 122°44′01″W	1851	1915	Abandoned	Abandoned with the closing of the town's post office.
Dedrick		Trinity	40°51′46″N 123°02′12″W	1890	After 1941	Abandoned	Seems to have still been inhabited as of 1951, per USGS.
Denny		Trinity	40°56′38″N 123°23′12″W	After 1851	c.1990s	Abandoned	
Desert Spring		Kern	35°16′20″N 118°37′34″W	Before 1834	After 1850	Barren	
Dogtown	Dogtown Diggings	Mono	38°10′13″N 119°11′51″W	1857	c.1890s	Barren	
Drawbridge	Saline City	Alameda	37°27′54″N 121°58′28″W	1876	1979	Abandoned	Population slowly declined due to the closing of nearby bridges and rampant vandalism in the town.
Dunmovin	Cowan Station	Inyo	36°05′19″N 117°57′40″W	Before 1936	N/A	Semi-abandoned	
Eagle Mountain		Riverside	33°51′27″N 115°29′14″W	1948	2003	Abandoned	A jailbreak at the Eagle Mountain Community Correctional Facility caused the prison to be shut down and the last population of the town to leave
Eastwood		San Diego	33°05′15″N 116°36′40″W	1869	c.1870s	Barren	Failed to compete with the rapidly growing nearby town of Julian.
Eldoradoville		Los Angeles	34°13′47″N 117°46′11″W	1859	1862	Barren	Town was washed away during the Great Flood Of 1862.
Elliott	Hocks Corners	San Joaquin	38°14′05″N 121°10′51″W	1846	After 1942	Semiabandoned	Site still inhabited, but the town itself ceased to exist decades ago. Last labeled on USGS maps in 1953.
Empire City		Stanislaus	37°38.239′N 120°54.167′W	1850	1862	Barren	The town was washed away during the Great Flood of 1862.
Essex		San Bernardino	34°44′01″N 115°14′42″W	Before 1937	N/A	Semi-abandoned	Declined slowly due to the opening of Interstate 40 as well as the remoteness of the town.
Falk		Humboldt					
Fountain Springs		Tulare	35°53′28″N 118°54′56″W				
Freeman Junction		Kern	35°36′06″N 117°54′11″W				
Fremont Valley		Calaveras					
French Flat		Tuolumne	37°58′20″N 120°28′17″W				
Furnace		Inyo	36°11′29″N 116°39′54″W				
Furnace Creek Inn		Inyo	36°27′02″N 116°51′08″W				
Garlock		Kern	35°24′09″N 117°47′24″W				
Gas Point		Shasta	40°24′56″N 122°32′04″W				
Gibsonville		Sierra	39°44′25″N 120°54′32″W				
Girard		Kern					
Glenburn		Kern	43°38′19″N 116°14′28″W				
Goffs		San Bernardino	34°55′09″N 115°03′46″W				
Gold Town		Kern	35°00′06″N 118°10′08″W				
Goler Heights		Kern	35°25′37″N 117°44′45″W				
Greasertown		Calaveras	38°11′28″N 120°45′15″W				
Greenwater		Inyo	36°10′46″N 116°36′59″W				
Greenwich		Kern					
Gerstley		Inyo	36°00′43″N 116°16′28″W				
Grub Gulch		Madera	37°19′29″N 119°46′15″W				
Gullion's Bar		Siskiyou	41°17′48″N 123°21′36″W				
Haiwee		Inyo	36°08′48″N 117°58′33″W				
Hamilton		Butte	39°27′09″N 121°38′28″W				
Hart		San Bernardino	35°17′20″N 115°06′12″W				
Hatfields Camp		Kern	35°28′26″N 117°52′06″W				
Hector		San Bernardino	34°48′13″N 116°27′08″W	around 1937	unknown	Semiabandoned	
Helena		Trinity	40°46′25″N 123°07′42″W				
Hoboken		Sacramento	38°33′28″N 121°25′04″W				
Hodson		Calaveras	37°59′48″N 120°41′08″W				
Hokokwito		Mariposa	37°45′30″N 119°35′43″W				
Holy City		Santa Clara	37°09′25″N 121°58′44″W				
Hope Valley		Alpine					
Horseshoe Bend		Mariposa	37°40′41″N 120°13′52″W				
Hollands		Los Angeles					
Igo		Shasta	40°30′20″N 122°32′30″W				
Independence Flat		Calaveras					
Indian Gulch		Mariposa	37°26′22″N 120°11′49″W				
Indian Springs		Kern					
Iowa Hill		Placer	39°06′31″N 120°51′34″W				
Isabella		Kern	35°39′20″N 118°27′40″W				
Ivanpah		San Bernardino	35°32′42″N 115°32′07″W				
Jaeger City		Imperial	32°43′52″N 114°37′47″W				
Joe Walker Town		Kern	35°25′20″N 118°29′35″W				
Joyfull		Kern					
Kasson		Inyo					
Kern River Slough		Kern	35°15′35″N 118°58′03″W				
Kernvale		Kern					
Kernville		Kern	35°42′51″N 118°26′12″W				
Kearsarge		Inyo	36°48′36″N 118°19′30″W				
Keeler		Inyo	36°29′14″N 117°52′26″W				
Kelso		San Bernardino	35°00′45″N 115°39′13″W				
Kingston		Kings	36°25′25″N 119°41′38″W				
Kumaini		Mariposa					
La Panza		San Luis Obispo	35°21′40″N 120°12′56″W				
Langdon		Kern					
Lavers' Crossing		Kern	35°44′12″N 118°43′16″W				
Leadfield		Inyo	36°50′48″N 117°03′33″W				
Lee		Inyo	36°34′46″N 116°40′12″W				
Lee Camp		Kern					
Leliter		Kern	35°42′38″N 117°49′49″W				
Leon		Riverside	33°39′09″N 117°08′08″W				
Lexington		Santa Clara	37°11′47″N 121°59′18″W				
Liberty		San Joaquin					
Linda Rosa		Riverside					
Lila C		Inyo	36°14′36″N 116°29′56″W				
Lillis		Fresno	36°26′18″N 119°43′03″W				
Little Cienega	La Cienega, Falling Springs	Los Angeles	34°18′06″N 117°50′21″W	before 1934	after 1998	Barren	Former resort town most recently occupied by a religious group. Remnants mostly destroyed by the Curve Fire.
Little Lake	Bramlette	Inyo					
Llano del Rio		Los Angeles	34°30′23″N 117°49′38″W				
Lone Pine Station		Inyo					
Lookout City		Inyo	36°14′45″N 117°26′05″W				
Lower Calaveritas		Calaveras					
Ludlow		San Bernardino	34°43′16″N 116°09′36″W				
Lyons Station		Los Angeles	34°21′46″N 118°30′27″W				
Macheto		Mariposa					
Mammoth City		Mono					
Manchester		Monterey					
Malakoff		Nevada					
Manzanar		Inyo	36°44′24″N 118°04′50″W				
Martensdale		Kern					
Martinez		Tuolumne County	38°01′24″N 120°22′47″W				
Masonic		Mono	38°21′45″N 119°06′45″W				
Melones		Calaveras	38°00′45″N 120°29′55″W				
Mentryville		Los Angeles	34°22′44″N 118°36′40″W				
Merced Falls		Merced	37°31′23″N 120°19′57″W				
Mercuryville		Sonoma	38°46′34″N 122°50′22″W				
Midland		Riverside	33°51′40″N 114°48′08″W				
Midway		Kern					
Mill Valley		Calaveras					
Minear		Mariposa					
Minersville		Trinity	40°51′05″N 122°46′59″W				
Mount Ophir		Mariposa	37°30′53″N 120°03′53″W				
Miramonte		Kern					
Mono Mills		Mono	37°53′15″N 118°57′34″W				
Monterio		Kern					
Moore's Flat		Nevada					
Mormon Island		Sacramento	38°42′13″N 121°07′03″W	1848	1856	Submerged	
Mountain House		Kern	35°41′31″N 118°55′03″W				
Muroc		Kern	34°55′23″N 117°52′20″W				
Narka		Inyo	35°53′52″N 117°54′04″W				
Negro Flat		Siskiyou	41°14′31″N 123°16′51″W				
Neuralia		Kern	35°11′52.80″N 118°02′31.20″W	1914	1916	Barren	
New Almaden		Santa Clara	37°10′48″N 121°50′08″W				
New Idria		San Benito	36°25′1″N 120°40′28″W				
Newtown		Mariposa	37°42′12″N 120°11′31″W				
Noonday Camp		Inyo	35°48′39″N 116°06′15″W				
Norristown		Sacramento	38°33′28″N 121°25′04″W				
North Muroc		Kern	35°00′18″N 117°49′08″W				
North Shore		Riverside	33°30′46″N 115°55′38″W				
Nortonville		Contra Costa	37°57′28″N 121°52′50″W				
Notomidula		Mariposa					
Olig		Kern	35°19′30″N 119°39′23″W				
Oregon Bar		Calaveras					
Oregon City		Butte	39°35′38″N 121°31′46″W				
Owensville		Inyo	37°24′03″N 118°20′44″W				
Packwood Station		Tulare					
Panamint City		Inyo	36°07′06″N 117°05′43″W				
Pasinogna		San Bernardino	33°59′24″N 117°43′03″W				
Patchen		Santa Clara					
Petersburg		Kern	35°36′09″N 118°36′13″W				
Petroleopolis		Los Angeles					
Picacho		Imperial	33°01′23″N 114°36′40″W				
Pinacate		Riverside	33°45′36″N 117°14′00″W				
Pioneertown		San Bernardino					
Piute		Kern					
Politana		San Bernardino					
Port Chicago		Contra Costa	38°02′46″N 122°01′15″W				
Port Wine		Sierra					
Prado		San Bernardino					
Prairie City		Sacramento					
Providence		San Bernardino	34°58′49″N 115°30′19″W				
Purissima		San Mateo	37°24′11″N 122°25′01″W	1868	early 1900s	Barren	Declined slowly due to declined of Redwood Lumber industry, and failure of the Ocean Shore Railroad
Pylema		Kern					
Quartzburg		Kern					
Quartzburg		Mariposa	37°32′22″N 120°12′16″W				
Ragtown		San Bernardino	34°39′36″N 116°09′03″W	after 1898	unknown	Barren	
Rincon		San Bernardino					
Randsburg		Kern					
Reefer City		Kern	35°00′21″N 118°11′06″W				
Reilly		Inyo	36°00′25″N 117°22′08″W				
Rice		San Bernardino	34°05′01″N 114°50′59″W				
Ridleys Ferry		Mariposa					
Rincon		San Bernardino					
Rio Bravo		Kern	35°17′49″N 119°03′24″W				
Riverview		Kern					
Roachville		Inyo					
Rock Springs		Kern					
Sablon	Rudolph	San Bernardino	34°10′29″N 114°59′39″W	1909	unknown	Barren	
Sage		Kern					
San Carlos		Inyo	36°48′14″N 118°07′34″W				
San Joaquin City		San Joaquin	37°40′12″N 121°15′58″W				
San Miguel de los Noches		Kern					
Sakaya		Mariposa					
Salmon Falls		El Dorado	38°45′29″N 121°03′30″W	1850	1950s	Submerged	California State Historical Marker #571
Saltus		San Bernardino	34°32′27″N 115°41′20″W	unknown	unknown	Abandoned	Supported salt evaporation. Notable for an unverified claim to the hottest temperature ever recorded.
Sandy Bar		Calaveras					
Sawmill Flat		Tuolumne	38°01′14″N 120°22′51″W				
Scheelite		Inyo					
Schwaub		Inyo	36°30′20″N 116°43′25″W				
Scovern Hot Springs		Kern	35°37′17″N 118°28′27″W				
Second Garrotte		Tuolumne	37°49′30″N 120°11′51″W				
Seneca		Plumas	40°06′38″N 121°05′05″W				
Shamrock		Kern					
Shasta		Shasta	40°35′32″N 122°28′40″W				
Siberia		San Bernardino	34°37′36″N 115°59′09″W				
Silver Mountain		Alpine					
Silver City, Tulare		Tulare	36°27′50″N 118°39′03″W				
Silver Lake		San Bernardino	35°22′16″N 116°6′54″W				
Skidoo		Inyo	36°26′08″N 117°08′51″W				
Sloss		Mariposa					
Smyrna		Kern					
Sodan		Inyo	35°55′16″N 117°54′10″W				
Sorrell's		Kern					
Spanish Bar		Calaveras					
St. Louis		Sierra					
Stedman	Steadman, Rochester, Copenhagen	San Bernardino	34°37′45″N 116°10′13″W	1898	1930s	Neglected	Abandoned when the Bagdad-Chase Mine went into receivership.
Stickneys Ferry		Tulare					
Stonewall		San Diego					
Stony Bar		Calaveras					
Strader		Kern					
Strand		Kern					
Stratton		San Diego					
Sullivan		Kern					
Sunland		Inyo	37°19′57″N 118°24′16″W				
Sunset		Kern					
Swansea		Inyo	36°31′29″N 117°54′14″W				
Taylors Bar		Calaveras					
Teagle		Kern					
Tehichipa		Kern					
Tejon		Kern					
Telegraph City	Grasshopper City	Calaveras	37°56′04″N 120°44′24″W	1860		Neglected	
Temescal		Riverside					
Terese Siding		Kern					
Terra Cotta		Riverside	33°42′11″N 117°22′29″W				
Timbuctoo		Yuba	39°13′01″N 121°19′07″W				
Toolwass		Kern					
Tumco		Imperial					
Unadilla		Kern					
Vaca Adobe		Kings	36°03′08″N 119°57′52″W				
Vallecito		San Diego	32°58′34″N 116°21′01″W				
Valley Wells		San Bernardino	35°49′42″N 117°19′54″W				
Vanderbilt		San Bernardino	35°19′38″N 115°14′59″W				
Vaughn		Kern					
Water Station		Kern					
Wenger		Mariposa					
Westville		Placer	39°10′30″N 120°38′53″W				
White Mountain City		Inyo					
Willard		Riverside					
Wingo		Sonoma	38°12′33″N 122°25′36″W				
Winter Garden		Kern					
Wiskala		Mariposa					
Woodfords		Alpine					
Woolsey Flat		Nevada	39°24′41″N 120°52′05″W				
Wrights		Santa Clara	37°08′21″N 121°56′49″W				
Yaqui Camp		Calaveras					
You Bet		Nevada	39°12′33″N 120°54′00″W				A gold mining town
Zurich	Alvord, Station	Inyo	37°10′58″N 118°15′36″W				

== Gallery ==
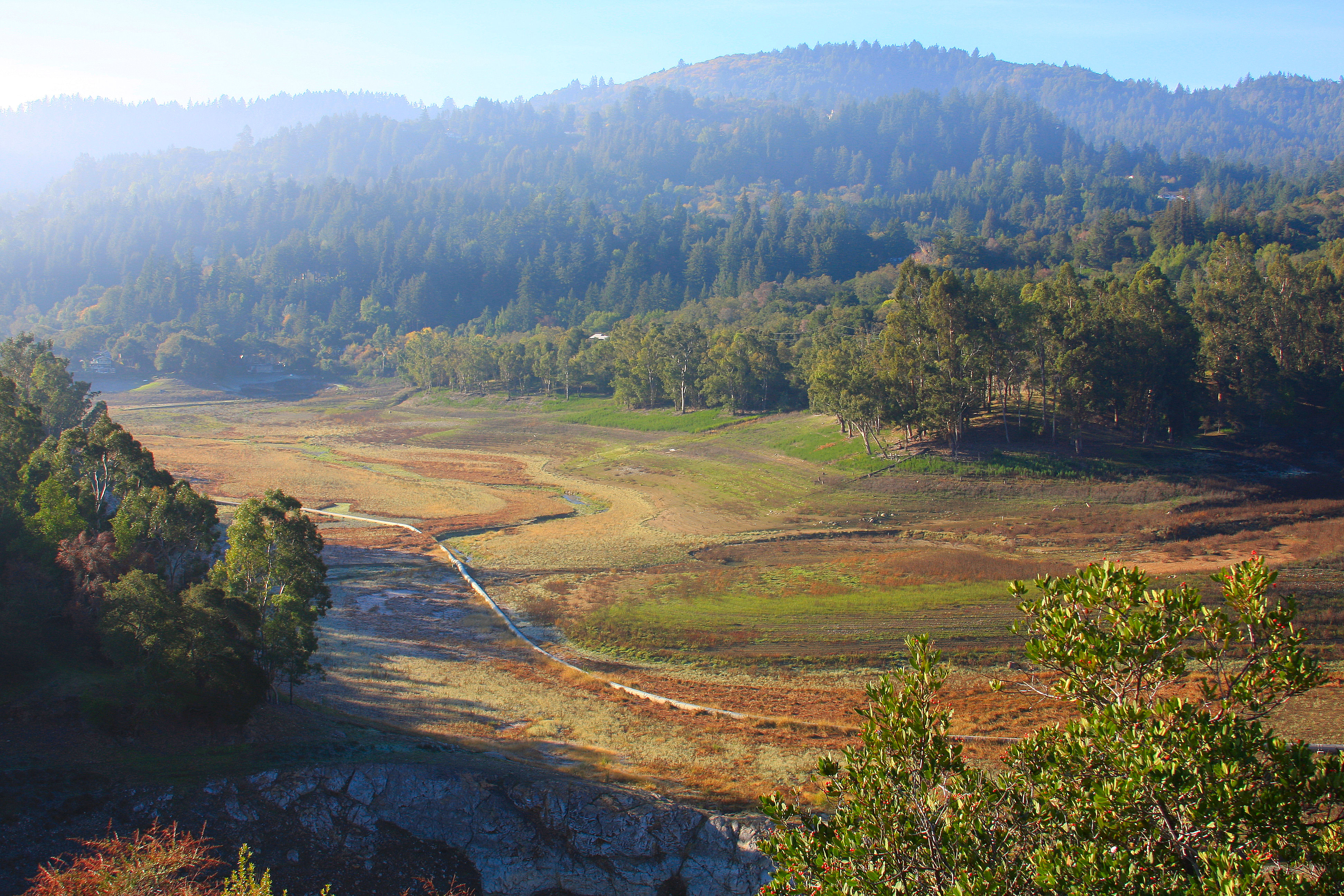
Alma in present times at low tide

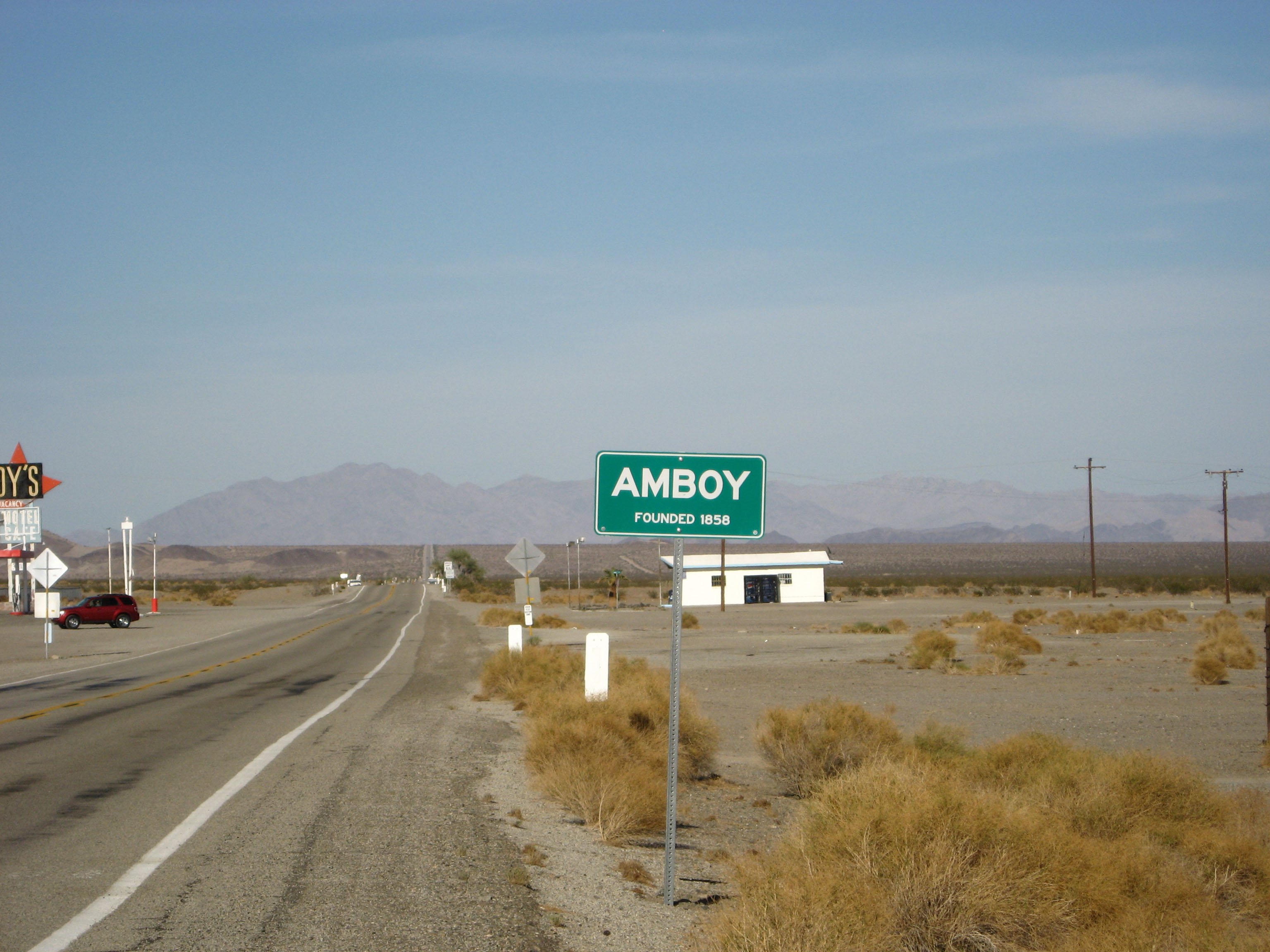
A sign for Amboy on the west side of town

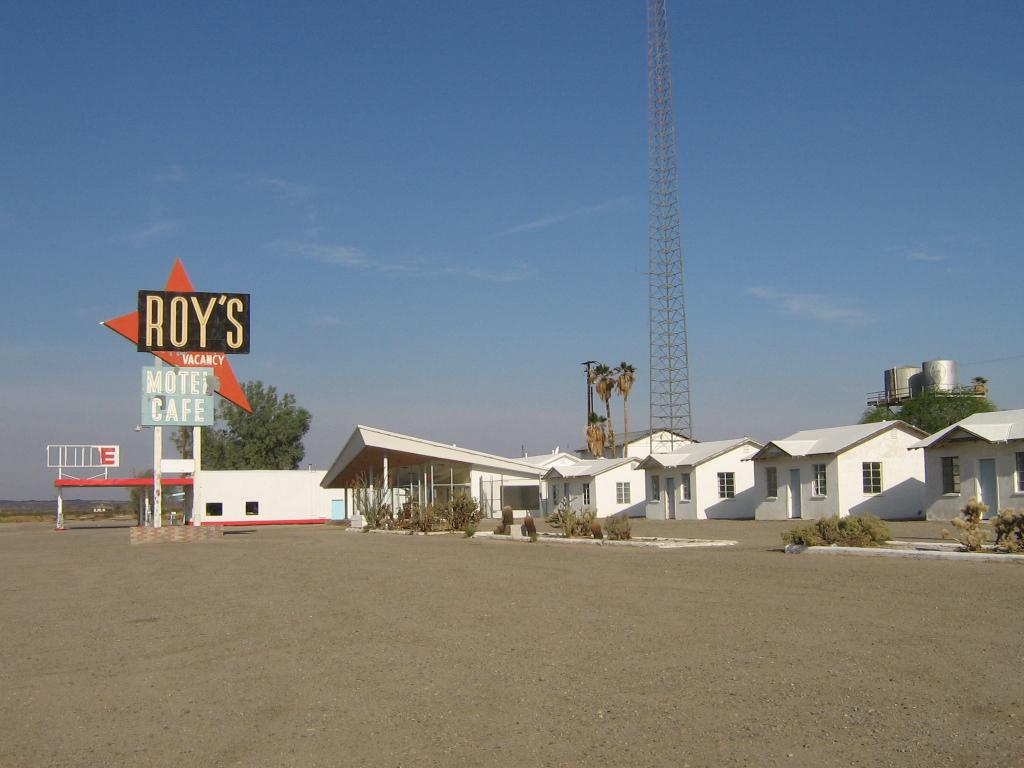
Roy's Motel and Café in Amboy on U.S. Route 66 in California in the Mojave Desert
