= Quartzburg =

Quartzburg may refer to:

- Quartzburg, former name of Nashville, California
- Quartzburg, Kern County, California
- Quartzburg, Mariposa County, California
- Quartzburg, Idaho
