= Sunland =

Sunland may refer to:

== Places ==
=== Canada ===
- Sunland, Alberta, a locality in Lamont County

=== South Africa ===
- Sunland, Eastern Cape, on the list of cities and towns in the Eastern Cape province

=== United States ===
- Sunland, Inyo County, California
- Sunland-Tujunga, Los Angeles, California
- Sunland, Tulare County, California, on the list of places in California
- Sunland, Florida in Seminole County, on the list of places in Florida
- Sunland Estates, Washington, a census-designated place in Grant County

== Other uses ==
- Sunland (train), a Seaboard Air Line train, on the list of named passenger trains of the United States
- Sunland Hospital, a defunct mental health chain in Florida
- Sunland Group, an Australian property development company

== See also ==
- Sunland Park (disambiguation)
- Sunlands, South Australia, a settlement on the Murray River
