= Blind Owl =

Blind Owl may refer to:

- The Blind Owl, a 1936 Persian novel by Sadegh Hedayat
  - The Blind Owl (film) (La chouette aveugle), 1987 film of the novel by Sadegh Hedayat, directed by Raúl Ruiz
- The Blind Owl Band, American bluegrass-rock-country-folk band formed in 2011
- "Blind Owl", a song by Badfinger on the 1973 album Ass
- Alan Wilson (musician) (1943–1970), American musician, leader, singer, and primary
