= Ivanpah (ghost town), California =

Ivanpah
- Ghost town
- Location within the state of California Ivanpah (the United States)
- Coordinates: 35°32′42″N 115°32′7″W
- Country: United States
- State: California
- County: San Bernardino
- Founded: 1869
- Time zone: UTC-8 (Pacific (PST))
  - Summer (DST): UTC-7 (PDT)

Ivanpah (sometimes referred to as Ivanpah I) was a short-lived silver mining town located in San Bernardino County, California, United States. It was founded in 1869 and existed until at least the mid-1880s.

View of the Bidwell Mill about 1880

== Location ==
Ivanpah was located at 35° 32' 42.15" -115° 32' 7.19" (WGS84), on the northeast side of Clark Mountain.

== History ==
While searching for copper, the Piute Company of California and Nevada in 1869 found rich deposits of silver ore on the lower slopes of what was soon named Clark Mountain, west of the Nevada line. The company laid out a townsite at Willow Spring, near a wash on the southeast slope, about nine miles east of the discoveries. The settlement was named Ivanpah, which, roughly translated from a Native American language (probably one of the Numic languages), means “clear water”.

By the summer of 1871, Ivanpah had become a small but well-established trading center for a huge district spilling over into Nevada. A traveler came across fifteen well-built adobe buildings, including a hotel, two stores, the office and headquarters of the Piute Company, and several small houses.

A deep gorge led to the mines, which were scattered about Mineral (Alaska) Hill. The chief properties were the Hite & Chatfield claim, which was soon renamed the Lizzie Bullock, and the Monitor and Beatrice, owned by the McFarlane brothers: Tom, Andrew, John, and William. Six miles southwest of Ivanpah was the Copper World Mine.

Despite litigation and intermittent depressions, the McFarlanes put up a 5-stamp mill near town in 1875; JA Bidwell, the new owner of the Lizzie Bullock, built a 10-stamp mill in 1876; and a post office was established in early 1878. By the spring of 1879, the 100 men on Alaska Hill were carrying on a brisk trade at Ivanpah’s two saloons, two stores, two blacksmith shops, two shoemakers’ shops, two hotels, two hay yards, a butcher shop, and several “neat and comfortable” houses. A weekly newspaper, named the Green-Eyed Monster, was founded in early 1880, but it died after a few issues.

The ore, however, was losing its value, and the new camps of Calico and Providence were drawing away miners. The post office was moved to the new smelter camp of Valley Wells in early 1899, and its name was changed to Rosalie. About a dozen stone and adobe ruins remain at the town-site and millsites.
