= Keane Wonder Mine =

Abandoned mining facility in Death Valley National Park, California

Coordinates: 36°40′9″N 116°54′34″W

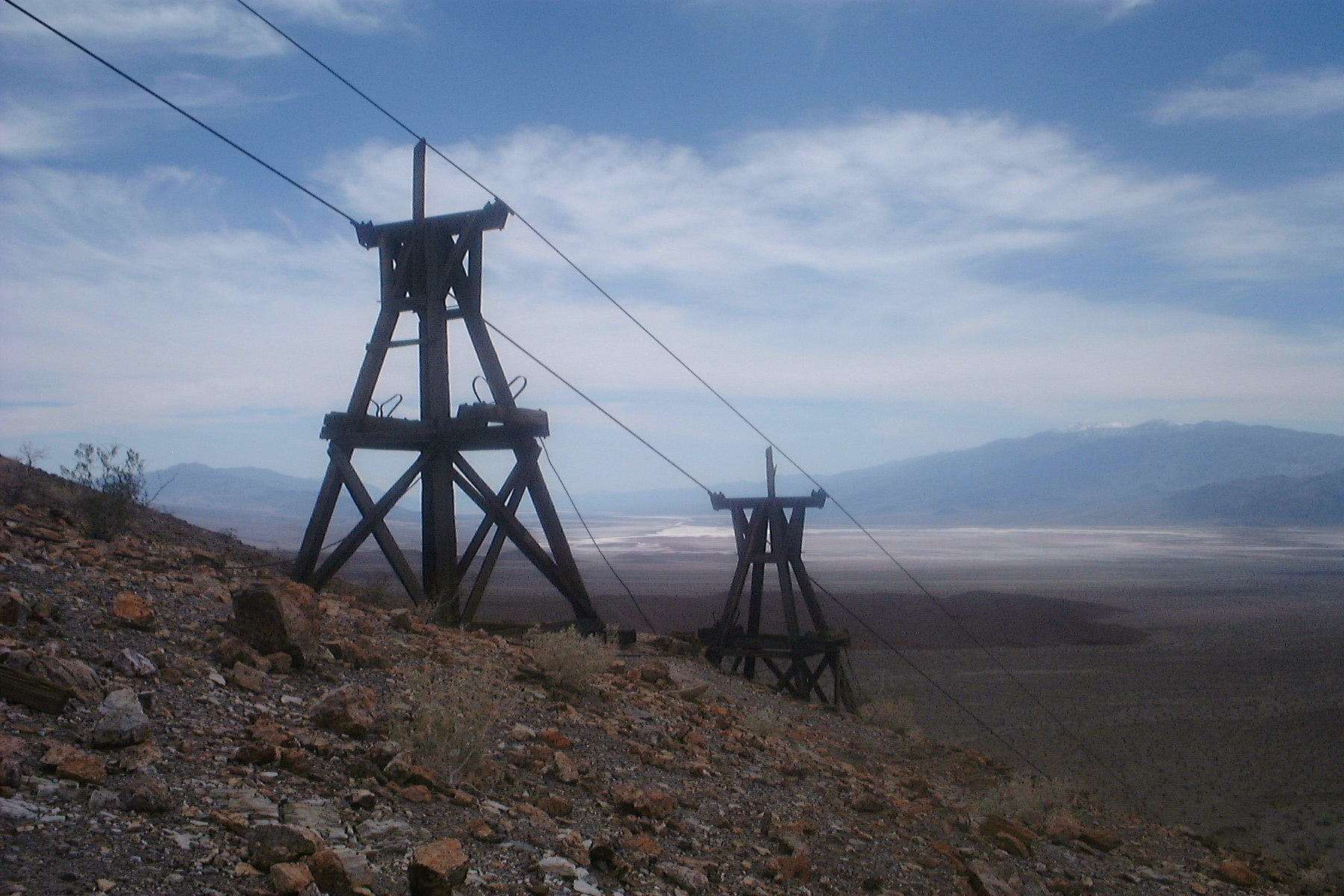
Tramway, Keane Wonder Mine.

The Keane Wonder Mine and mill is an abandoned mining facility located within Death Valley National Park in Inyo County, California. It is located in the Funeral Mountains east of Death Valley and Furnace Creek, California

== History ==
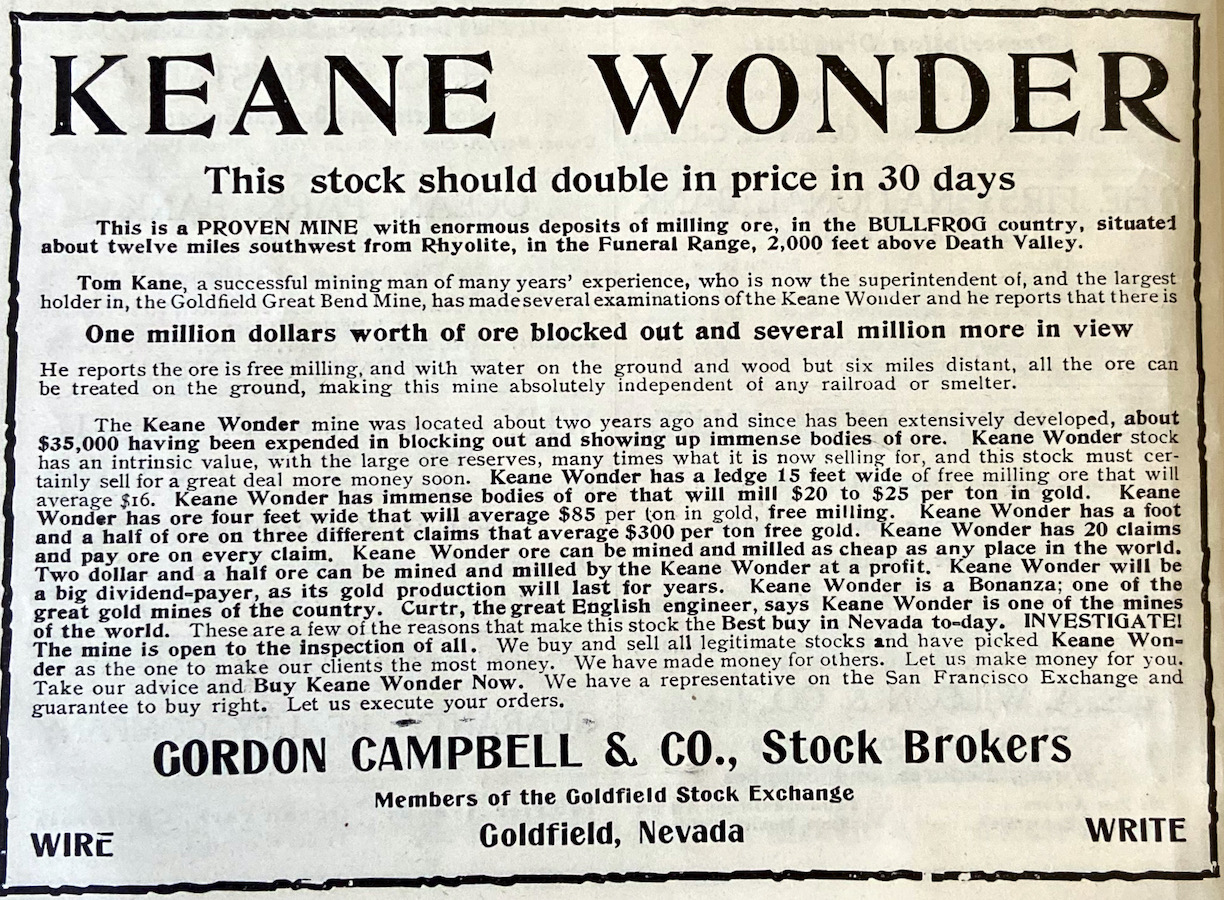
Advertisement of 1906

The mine was dug during the early 1900s Death valley mining boom. Neighboring mines with names like Skidoo, California and Rhyolite, Nevada competed to pull as much gold out of the ground as possible. This boom slowed as a result of the Panic of 1907 and paused when the area was designated a National Monument by President Herbert Hoover. Mining in the valley did not stop completely until an increasing series of government interventions eventually resulted in Death Valley's 1994 designation as a National Park. The last active mine in Death Valley closed in 2005.

The location was discovered by a miner named Jack Keane. Keane and a partner named Domingo Etcharren had scouted the area, called Chloride Cliffs, and had located a potential silver mine. Etcharren eventually left while Keane stayed behind to scout the area more thoroughly. As Etcharren was leaving he noticed an outcropping of quartz, which can often be found near gold deposits. When Keane investigated further, he discovered gold. Keane named the find "Keane's Wonder" and the two miners quickly sold an option on the claim to a New Yorker named Joseph DeLamar.

The discovery caused a brief gold rush, which was soon eclipsed by a larger find further north. DeLamar was disappointed with the gold his employees found and forfeited the option. This happened with a second investor as well. It was not until 1906 when investors John Campbell and then Homer Wilson turned the find into a major mine. The mine turned out to be a profitable operation. Etcharren used his share to purchase a store, while Keane was later involved in two shootings and was imprisoned in Ireland for murder.

Homer Wilson moved to the mine site with his family, and created two towns in the area called Keane Springs and Chloride City, California. Both towns failed within months of their founding in April, 1906. Despite the failure of the towns, the mine continued to be profitable throughout the Panic of 1907 and the subsequent depression. It was limited only by a lack of water and the extremely high heat in the valley, which forced Wilson to have the miners work at night. The mine's aerial tramway became an attraction, and a railroad was briefly built in the area to connect with the Tonopah and Tidewater Railroad. However, the mine was embroiled in a long legal controversy after a financial maneuver involving the failed State Bank and Trust Company of Nevada. The mine had largely been tapped out by 1912, and it was closed that year after being sold.

== Visiting ==
The Keane Wonder Mine was among the most successful gold mines in the valley and followed the course of a rich vein of ore. The miners attempted to remove as much of the ore as possible, and as a result dug out large areas, with only a few pillars to keep the mine from collapsing. This has led to the instability of both the mine and the land above it, and has led the National Park Service to close the area to visitors.

The presence of toxic chemicals, such as lead and mercury, which are by-products of processing, and the detection of cyanide, which was used to process gold ore, added to the park closing the mine area.

In addition to the mine, a gravity-powered aerial tramway and a stamp mill were built on the site. Both of these structures were popular with tourists, but have suffered from neglect, but the National Park Service reopened the mill and mine site to visitors in November 2017.

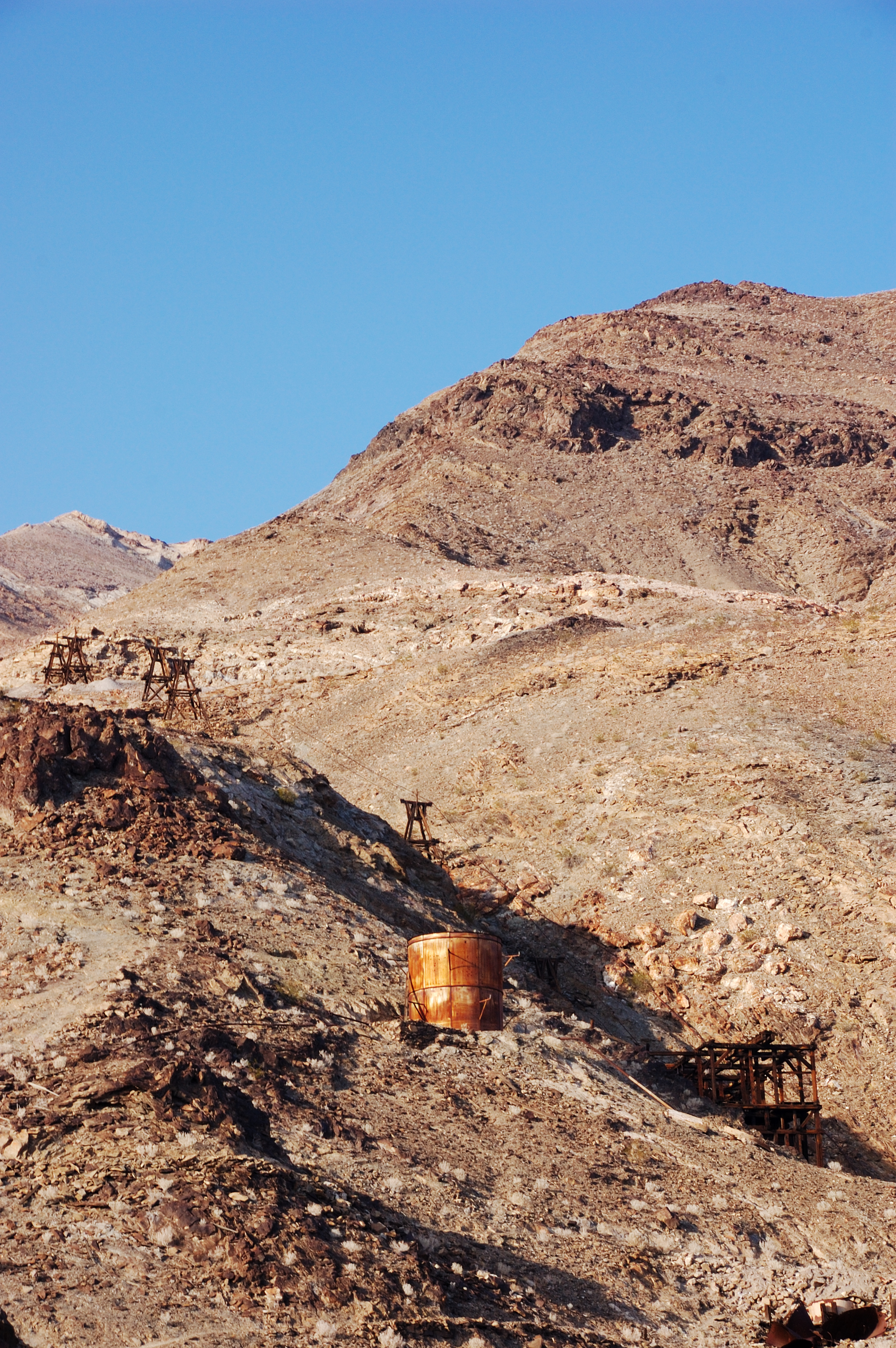
Tramway Ruins

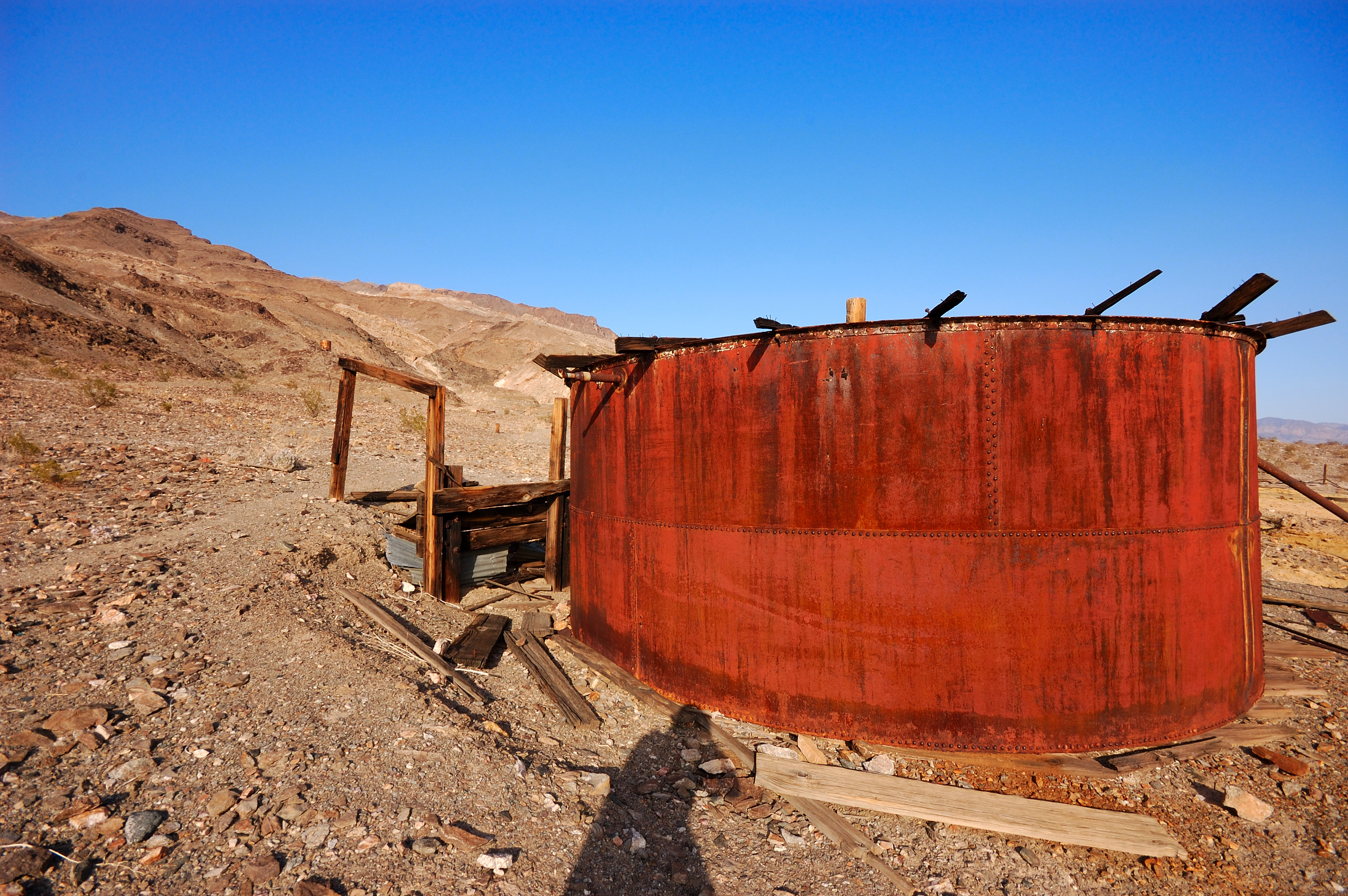
Storage Tank

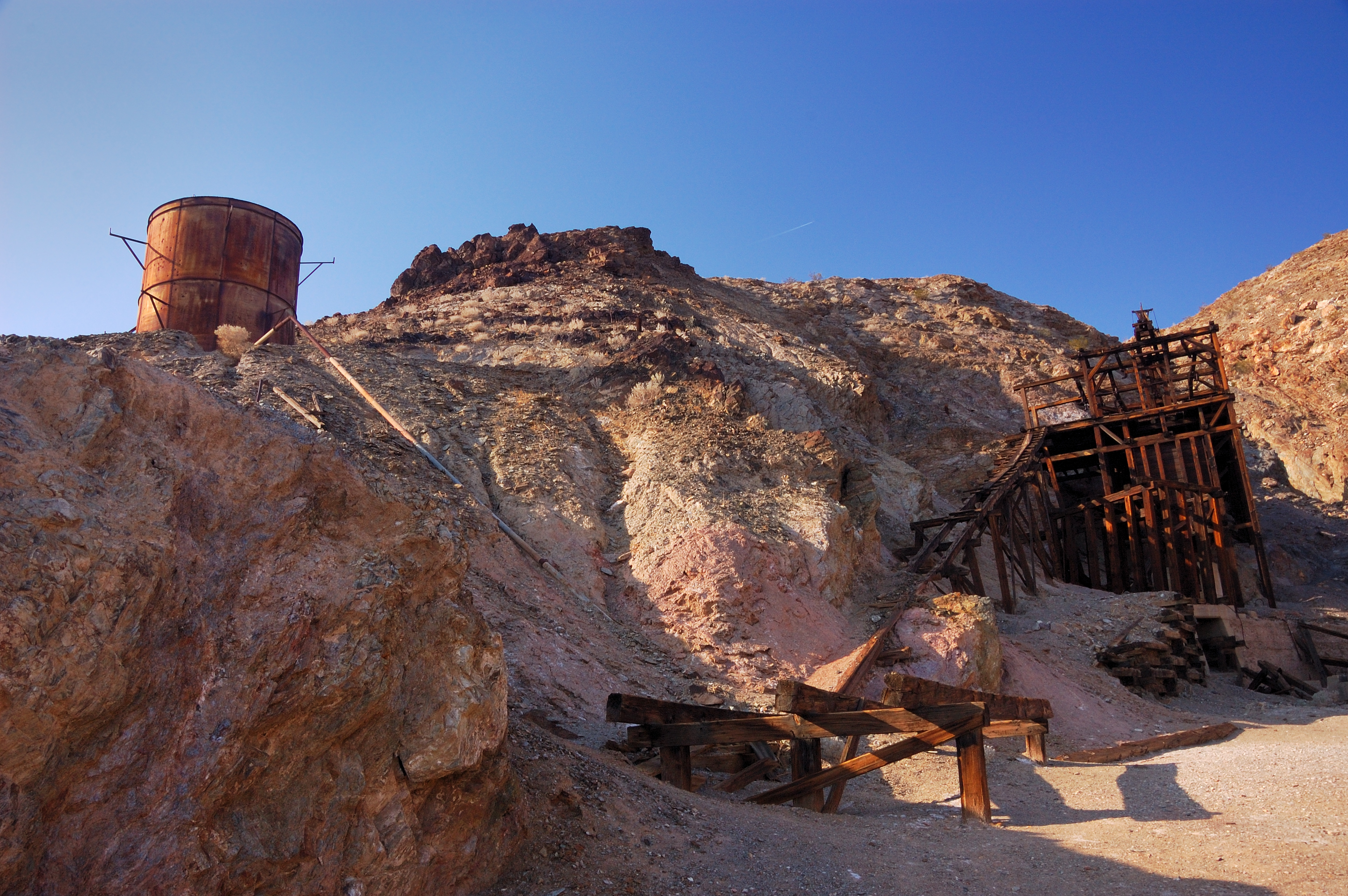
Lower Tramway Terminal and Mill

== See also ==
- Category: Death Valley
