= Sodan =

Sodan may refer to:

- Sodan, California, a former settlement in the United States
- Sodan, a fictional faction in the mythology of Stargate
