= Minersville =

Minersville may refer to the following places in the United States:

- Minersville, California
- Minersville, Nebraska
- Minersville, Ohio
- Minersville, Pennsylvania
- Minersville, Utah
- Minersville, Wisconsin, part of Ashland
- Minersville, Iowa County, Wisconsin
