= Susquehanna Breakdown Music Festival =

Coordinates: 41.34757°N 75.66382°W

- Genre: Alternative Rock, Americana, Bluegrass, Blues, Blues Rock, Classic Rock, Folk, Hard Rock, Jam, Psychedelic Rock, Rock, Roots Rock, Soul, Southern Rock
- Dates: Early/Mid May
- Location: Scranton, Pennsylvania
- Years active: 2013-19, 2021–present
- Founders: The Weekender, Cabinet, Backyard Alehouse, and Live Nation Entertainment
- Website: www.susquehannabreakdown.com

The Susquehanna Breakdown Music Festival, formerly known as The Old Farmer's Ball, is a one-day music festival held at the Toyota Pavilion at Montage Mountain in Scranton, Pennsylvania. The focus of the festival centers around the arts and spans musical genres including folk, Americana, roots, and bluegrass. The festival began in 2013 when Cabinet, a prominent regional band in Northeastern Pennsylvania, and Live Nation Entertainment started the festival to bring attention to not only their musical genre, but also to regional artists, farmers and craftsmen, who showcased and sold their wares throughout the festival. To bring further attention to the festival The Weekender and local pub The Backyard Alehouse signed on as sponsors, and thus the festival began. It was renamed in 2014 to reflect the name of a Cabinet song and to further personalize it for not only themselves, but both fans and concertgoers.

There was no festival in 2020.

== 2016 Lineup ==
- Railroad Earth
- The Infamous Stringdusters
- Cabinet
- Twiddle
- The Larry Keel Experience
- Fruition
- Driftwood
- Cornmeal
- Pappy & Friends
- Flux Capacitor
- Swift Technique
- Coal Town Rounders
- FMO
- The Far Future
- Kopec
- The Dishonest Fiddlers
- Graham Mazer Duo

== 2015 Lineup ==
- Cabinet - 4 full sets including a Big Band set
- Bill Evans' Soulgrass
- Pigeons Playing Ping Pong
- Ryan Montbleau
- Citizens Band Radio
- Scott Law
- Ron Holloway
- Coal Town Rounders
- King Radio
- Grand Ole' Ditch
- Pappy
- Tom Graham & Justin Mazer
- George Wesley
- Still Hand String Band
- Mountain Sky Orchestra
- Boiled Owls
- Jay Noble

== 2014 Lineup ==
- Cabinet
- Sister Sparrow & the Dirty Birds
- Marco Benevento
- Floodwood featuring Al Schnier and Vinnie Amico
- Ron Holloway
- Terrapin Flyer
- Leroy Justice
- Schooley Mountain Band
- Driftwood
- The Brummy Brothers
- Eastbound Jesus
- Coal Town Rounders
- The Blind Owl Band
- Rogue Chimp
- And The Moneynotes
- FMO
- Pappy
- Tom Graham
- The Kalob Griffin Band
- Freight Train
- Jami Novak
- Abby Millon
- Jordan Tarter
- Mollie Edsell
- Sam Cutler

== 2013 Old Farmer's Ball Lineup ==
- Cabinet
- Yarn
- Holy Ghost Tent Revival
- MiZ
- And The Moneynotes
- Pappy
- Coal Town Rounders
- Kyle Morgan
