= Deadwood, California =

Deadwood, California may refer to:

- Deadwood, Placer County, California
- Deadwood, Sierra County, California
- Deadwood, Trinity County, California
- Deadwood, Tuolumne County, California
