= Roachville =

Roachville may refer to:

- Roachville, Kentucky, a community in Green County
- Roachville, California, a mining settlement in Inyo County
