= Blue Mountain City, California =

Coordinates: 38.3822°N 120.3552°W

Blue Mountain City is a former settlement in Calaveras County, California, United States, along Licking Fork, approximately 20 miles (32 km) northeast of Mountain Ranch. The town was built on a flat bench of land above the mining camp which perched on a steep canyon slope on the west side of Licking Fork, just over one mile downstream from the headwaters. The town was first announced in January, 1863. The Heckendorn Gold and Silver Mining Company was organized by July, with C. C. Bowman as its secretary. A post office operated in Blue Mountain from 1863 to 1864.

Blue Mountain is also the name of a mining district located 10 miles southeast of West Point that includes the Black Wonder, Gold King and Heckendorn mines.

== See also ==
- List of ghost towns in California
