= Reilly, California =

Reilly
- Former settlement
- Location in California
- Coordinates: 36°00′25″N 117°22′08″W
- Country: United States
- State: California
- County: Inyo
- Elevation: 2,582 ft (787 m)

Reilly is a former settlement in Inyo County, California, United States. It was located on the west side of the Panamint Valley, at an elevation of 2582 feet (787 m). Reilly was a silver mining community during the late 19th century.

A post office operated at Reilly in 1883.

Reilly is on the National Register of Historic Places.

== Time Line ==
- The Sherman Mining District was established in the 1860s. Theodore and Albert Wibbett discovered ore here in 1869. Between 1877 and 1882 Theodore staked several claims that were purchased on May 23, 1882, by Edward Reilly.
- October 1882. A mill was ordered, the claims were surveyed.
- November 13, 1882. Reilly sold the claims & water rights to the Argus Range Silver Mining Company for $500,000. The Argus Range Silver Mining Company of New York operated 24 months from 1882 until June 1884, $240,000 was invested. The Mine Returned $23,000
- January 22, 1883. A post office was established.
- October 1883. The mill operated for 4 days, produced 137 oz. from 30 tons of ore.
- October 15, 1883 the post office moved to Darwin.
- The mill operated intermittently until April 1884.
- June 20, 1884. An ad in the Inyo Independent offering to custom mill ore at Reilly, implying that the mines have “played out.”
- 1884. Numerous lawsuits filed by unpaid laborers and suppliers.
- February 29, 1885 the property was sold for $287.74 to Isaac Harris for unpaid taxes. The mill and millsite was sold for $171.63, also to Harris.
- May 4, 1885 Edward Reilly bought back the claims and mill.
- August 7, 1885. The property was sold for $1,360.34 to Harris Yerington, owner of the Virginia and Truckee Railroad, for unpaid debts.
- February 20, 1891 Yerington sold the property to the State of California for $300.

== See also ==
- List of ghost towns in California
