= San Miguel de los Noches, California =

Human settlement in Kern County, California, United States of America

Coordinates: 35.3869°N 119.01880°W

San Miguel de los Noches was an Indian rancheria in Kern County, California, United States. Its site is covered by the modern-day city of Bakersfield.

Franciscan friar Padre Francisco Garces visited San Miguel de los Noches on May 7, 1776. Father Garces named this site San Miguel de los Noches.

Today, the Garces Memorial Circle is a testament of San Miguel de los Noches.

== See also ==
- List of ghost towns in California
