= French Flat =

Coordinates: 37°58′20″N 120°28′17″W

French Flat or French Camp now a ghost town was in Tuolumne County, California, United States. It was located near French Flat from which it took its name, one and one-half miles south-southwest of Tuttletown. Its location was near the flat, northwest of an 1,894-foot (577 m) mountain.

== History ==
The town was a company mining town during the 1860s with a population of about 1,000.

== Today ==
The site today is accessed by French Flat Road, off Rawhide Road, through private property. There are remains of a water cistern, water tanks, foundations of a hotel and various buildings and remains of fences.

== See also ==
- List of ghost towns in California
