= Westville, California =

Unincorporated community in California, United States

Westville
- Unincorporated community
- Location in California Westville (the United States)
- Coordinates: 39°10′30″N 120°38′53″W
- Country: United States
- State: California
- County: Placer County
- Elevation: 5,200 ft (1,600 m)

Westville was a former settlement in Placer County, California. Westville was located 14 miles (22.5 km) northeast of Foresthill, at an elevation of 5249 feet (1600 m).

The Westville post office operated from 1889 to 1919. The name honors the first postmaster, George C. West.

Westville was once a supply and staging center for forty mines in the area. By 1925, only two residents remained, both of whom were arrested on October 8 of that year for possession of liquor, rendering Westville a "ghost city". Little remains at the site today.

== See also ==
- List of ghost towns in California
