= Woolsey Flat, California =

Woolsey Flat
- Ghost town
- Location in California
- Coordinates: 39°24′41″N 120°52′05″W
- Country: United States
- State: California
- County: Nevada County
- Elevation: 4,199 ft (1,280 m)

Woolsey Flat or Woolsey's Flat was a historic mining town located on the San Juan Ridge, located about 17 miles northeast of Nevada City and about 3 miles northeast of North Bloomfield. The town was about 1 mile south of the Middle Yuba at an elevation of about 4200 ft. To the east lay the mining towns of Moore's Flat and Orleans Flat, each about I mile apart. All three were settled in 1851 and their histories frequently intertwine. Collectively, they are sometimes referred to as "The Flats. All three were part of Eureka Township.

An early pioneer describes the physical relation of the three Flats as follows: "Moore's Flat, Orleans Flat and Woolsey's Flat are all similarly situated on different points of the mountain, on the north side of the ridge between the South and Middle Yuba River, and all at about the same altitude. A very deep canyon lies between each of them, but a good mountain road was built around the head of each canyon, connecting the towns."

== Early history ==
Woolsey's Flat was founded in 1851, and named after its founder James Woolsey. It lies on a part of the auriferous (gold bearing) channel which runs the length of the San Juan Ridge.

Woolsey's Flat flourished in the 1850s. It had hotels, saloons, stores and a stable. Advertisements for balls and other entertainments appear regularly. The town benefited from several toll roads. It was served daily first by Langton's Pioneer Express and then by the Gregory & English Stage and Express Line, which ran between Nevada City and Eureka, now Graniteville. In 1856, a resident reported a population of 500 and 100 houses. In the 1856 presidential election, a total of 214 votes were cast, of which 112 were for Buchanan, 104 for Fillmore and 4 for Fremont. By the 1860 election, the number of presidential votes had fallen to 108, of which Lincoln received 27 and Douglas 41.

== Mining ==
Mining began with surface mining which soon played out. With the arrival of ditch water in 1853, hydraulic mining took off. The first ditch, the Poorman's Creek Ditch was commenced in 1853 by Berryman and others, running from Poorman's Creek to Orleans Flat. The Miners' Ditch, bringing water from the Middle Yuba, was constructed in 1855. Eventually, these ditches hooked up with the Eureka Lake Water Co. ditch bringing water from the High Sierra. The mines were deemed to be very rich but difficult to mine. Principal mines included the Boston, X IX and the Blue Ravine.

Jim Woolsey, the town's founder, was a successful miner. Contemporary accounts credit him with finding a gold nugget weighing 154 ounces valued then at $2000, another weighing 103 ounces and a boulder containing 97 ounces of gold. Nevertheless, by 1857, Woolsey advertised that "having determined to remove to the Atlantic States," his mining claims were for sale.

In the 1860s, mining and the town experienced a period of decline. Part of the problem was a shortage of water on that part of the Ridge, presumably from drought, in 1864. One newspaper reported that at Woolsey's Flat "there is not sufficient water to supply one fourth of the demand" leaving the town "nearly depopulated." When water reappeared, there arose a dispute between the miners and the water company over the price of water, the miners claiming that they were being overcharged compared to neighboring towns. Mining was particularly dangerous at Woolsey's Flat because the gold lay under very deep gravel; at one place hydraulic mining cut a 200 foot bank. As one paper reported, at Woolsey's Flat "the banks are so high and steep, that there is constant danger of their caving in and burying the workmen." Reports of mining accidents, many fatal, were frequent.

== Decline ==
In 1867, one historian deemed Woolsey's Flat "an unimportant place, most of the inhabitants having removed to the more prosperous neighboring town [Moore's Flat], or left for other sections." A scarlet fever outbreak in Woolsey's Flat in 1869 did not help matters. Even as the town declined, hydraulic mining continued into the 70s with regular reports of profitable returns at such mines as the Blue Banks, the Oriental and the Boston.

In 1874, it was reported that "[t]he country about Woolsey's Flat has been settling and sliding very fast the last three or four days and the inhabitants of that berg [sic] are tearing down and moving houses at a lively rate." Both hotels were torn down and some of the houses were moved closer to Moore's Flat.

Soon the mines were becoming exhausted. By 1880, another historian observed: "One by one the hotels, stores and saloons closed out their business and departed until, in 1874, the last attempt at business, a hotel, was closed, and Woolsey's Flat gave up the ghost."
