= Martinez, Tuolumne County, California =

Coordinates: 38°01′24″N 120°22′47″W

Martinez (Spanish: Martínez) was a mining settlement during the California Gold Rush in Tuolumne County, California, United States. It became a ghost town, but now is a populated place at a mean elevation of 2,182 feet (665 meters), north of Sawmill Flat, another former gold rush settlement.

== See also ==
- List of ghost towns in California
