= Lingo Canyon =

Coordinates: 35.37028°N 120.30611°W

Lingo Canyon is a canyon in San Luis Obispo county in California.

It was named for George Washington Lingo, an early settler. George Washington Lingo was a native of Randolph County, Missouri, where he was born on March 25, 1833, a son of Samuel Lingo, a Carolinian who came to Missouri by way of Tennessee.

== See also ==
- La Panza Canyon
