= Roachville, California =

American former small mining settlement

Roachville is a former small mining settlement, now in Inyo County, California, United States. It was founded in 1861 on the eastern slope of the White Mountains, at the lower reaches of Cottonwood Creek, northwest of White Mountain City.

== History ==
Roachville and White Mountain City, settlements east of the White Mountains from Owens Valley, were used for a California election fraud in the fall of 1861. The Warm Springs precinct covering these sparsely populated settlements was populated with an additional 521 voters culled from the passenger list of a steamship that had recently arrived in San Francisco.

== Location ==
The site of Roachville is on Cottonwood Creek, northeast of White Mountain City near the Mono County border.

== See also ==
- List of ghost towns in California
