= Greasertown, California =

Coordinates: 38.1817°N 120.7694°W

Greasertown is a former gold rush settlement in Calaveras County, California, United States, 4 miles (6.4 km) west of San Andreas, on the west side of the Calaveras River. It was first mentioned in a newspaper in 1851. When it caught fire the next year, "Spanish incendiaries" were blamed which so angered the locals that they drove out all the Hispanics they could find. However, it survived at least into the 1860s. It was submerged when the first Hogan Dam on the Calaveras River was built in the late 1920s. Greasertown was not renamed Petersburg; they were separate communities a mile apart. Petersburg was founded in 1858.

== See also ==
- List of ghost towns in California
