= Leliter, California =

Leliter
- Ghost town
- Location in California
- Coordinates: 35°42′38″N 117°49′49″W
- Country: United States
- State: California
- County: Kern
- Elevation: 2,303 ft (702 m)

Leliter (also Muerto) is a former settlement in Kern County, California, United States. It was located on the Southern Pacific Railroad, 4.5 miles (7.2 km) north-northwest of Inyokern in the Indian Wells Valley, at an elevation of 2303 feet (702 m). Leliter still appeared on maps as of 1943.

Though Leliter is a former settlement, residents still reside in and around the area. Today, no sign of the original settlement remains, except for Leliter Road (named after the settlement) that heads west from Brown Road (Old US 395) to link up with modern-day US 395. A post office operated at Leliter from 1910 to 1927.
