= Lookout City, California =

Lookout City
- Ghost town
- Location in California
- Coordinates: 36°14′45″N 117°26′05″W
- Country: United States
- State: California
- County: Inyo
- Elevation: 3,579 ft (1,091 m)

Lookout City is a former settlement in the Mojave Desert, in Inyo County, California, United States. It lay at an elevation of 3579 feet (1091 m).

== History ==
In 1875 rich deposits of silver-lead ore were discovered in the Argus Range on top of Lookout Mountain. The discovery was named the Modoc, and was sold to a group of investors which included George Hearst, the famed mining engineer, U.S. Senator, and father of William Randolph Hearst. (He was also the great-great grandfather of Patty Hearst.)

The Modoc Consolidated Mining Company was formed with the Modoc mine as the principal mine. Together with the discovery of other nearby mines, which included the Minnietta Belle below Lookout Mountain, these mines formed the basis for the Modoc District with the townsite of Lookout located on top of Lookout Mountain.

The town of Lookout consisted of two general stores, three saloons, company offices, and as many as 30 other wood and stone structures. By 1876, two 60 ton furnaces and a 10-stamp mill were running and production was quoted as running 160 silver-lead bars per day. The bars averaged 90 lbs. each and assayed around $400.00. By the end of 1876 Remi Nadeau's Cerro Gordo Freighting Company had hauled 10,000 bars worth some $4,000,000 over the Bullion Trail which was originally built for the ore of the Cerro Gordo Mines. Remi Nadeau needed a faster route for his teams, so he constructed the Nadeau "Shotgun" road across the Panamint Valley and over the Slate Range to meet the Bullion Trail south of China Lake.

To supply the furnaces with charcoal, ten charcoal kilns were built in Wildrose Canyon, 25 miles away in the Panamint Range, and a steady stream of burros delivered charcoal in sacks to Lookout City via a pack trail on the east side of Lookout Mountain. The U.S. Bureau of Mines reported that total production during the period 1875 through 1890 amounted to $1,900,000 from the Modoc Mine alone.
