= Reefer City, California =

Reefer City
- Ghost town
- Location in California
- Coordinates: 35°00′21″N 118°11′06″W
- Country: United States
- State: California
- County: Kern
- Named for: Refrigerated train cars
- Elevation: 2,762 ft (842 m)

Reefer City is a ghost town in Kern County, California, United States. It was located 3.25 miles (5.2 km) south-southwest of Mojave, at an elevation of 2762 feet (842 m). Reefer City still appeared on maps as late as 1947.

Reefer City was established in June 1936 by Consolidated Gold Fields of South Africa, formerly Gold Fields of South Africa Limited, a company founded and based in London, after a gold lode was discovered on Soledad Mountain near Mojave. The company purchased refrigerator cars, known colloquially as "reefers", from the Southern Pacific Railroad to house the miners. After the mine closed in 1942, the community housed military personnel from Edwards Air Force Base until the 1960s. In 1971, Reefer City was purchased and demolished by a salvage company.
