= Cañon City, California =

Canon City, California
- Ghost town
- Location within California
- Coordinates: 40°49′53″N 123°03′10″W
- Country: United States
- State: California
- County: Trinity
- Elevation: 2,142 ft (653 m)
- GNIS feature ID: 257940

Canon City, California is a ghost town in Trinity County, California.

== History ==
The town was populated circa 1851–1891. It had a post office from 1856 to 1857. In 1857, a road was completed from Canon City to Weaverville.

A historical marker is all that remains of the former town.

== Demographics ==
Historical population
Census	Pop.	Note	%±
1870	130		—
U.S. Decennial Census; 1850–1870 1880-1890; 1900 1910 1920; 1930 1940 1950; 1960 1970 1980; 1990 2000 2010

== See also ==
- List of ghost towns in California
