= Sodan, California =

Extinct hamlet in California, U.S.

Coordinates: 35°55′15.9″N 117°54′09.9″W

Sodan is a former settlement in Inyo County, California, United States. It was located on the Southern Pacific Railroad about halfway between Narka and Little Lake.

== See also ==
- List of ghost towns in California
