= Schwaub, California =

Schwaub
- Former settlement
- Location in California
- Coordinates: 36°30′20″N 116°43′25″W
- Country: United States
- State: California
- County: Inyo
- Elevation: 3,389 ft (1,033 m)

Schwaub (also Schwab) is a former settlement in Inyo County, California, United States. It was located in the Funeral Mountains of Death Valley 12 miles (19 km) north of Ryan.

In 1905, gold was discovered nearby, and the town was built. The Schwab post office opened and closed in 1907.

The town was named for Charles M. Schwab, and had several saloons, a blacksmith, a boarding house, and a general store. However, the town was taken over by three women who drove out the town's saloons, and as a result, most of Schwab's men, leading to the eventual decline of the town. The Stray Horse mine, which served the workers who lived in Schwab, still stands today, along with several buildings of the town, and items such as cans and shattered glass.

== See also ==
- List of ghost towns in California
