= Dedrick, California =

Dedrick
- Ghost town
- Location within California Location within the United States
- Coordinates: 40°51′46″N 123°02′12″W
- Country: United States
- State: California
- County: Trinity
- Elevation: 2,526 ft (770 m)
- GNIS feature ID: 1655959

Dedrick is a ghost town in Trinity County, California, United States.

== History ==
Dedrick had a post office from 1891 to 1941.

The Globe Mine near Dedrick was in operation from 1890 until 1918. The mine, reported as being among the highest in the state, was located at about 7000 feet and used a two mile long aerial tramway and a 20-stamp mill. In 1912, it was reported that one hundred men were on the payroll.

In 1903, Dedrick was referred to as a mining camp with the Chloride-Bailey mine in operation along with Dibble's Saloon.

== Historical Marker ==
A historical marker was erected in 1994 by Leonard Morris Family and E Clampus Vitus, Trinitarianus Chapter #62.

== See also ==
- List of ghost towns in California
- Trinity County, California
