= Elliott, California =

Coordinates: 38°14′05″N 121°10′51″W

Elliott is a ghost town in San Joaquin County, in the U.S. state of California.

== History ==
The first settlement at Elliott was made in 1846. A post office called Elliott was established in 1863, and remained in operation until 1901.

== See also ==
- List of ghost towns in California
