= Deadwood, Placer County, California =

Deadwood
- Ghost town
- Location in California Deadwood (the United States)
- Coordinates: 39°04′50″N 120°41′22″W
- Country: United States
- State: California
- County: Placer County
- Established: 1852
- Elevation: 4,000 ft (1,200 m)

Deadwood is a ghost town in Placer County, California.

== History ==
Deadwood town was founded in 1852 after the gold was found in the surrounding areas.

== See also ==
- List of ghost towns in California
- Deadwood, California (disambiguation)
