= Telegraph City, California =

Unincorporated community in California, United States

Telegraph City
- Unincorporated town
- Location in California Telegraph City (the United States)
- Coordinates: 37°56′04″N 120°44′24″W
- Country: United States
- State: California
- County: Calaveras
- Elevation: 653 ft (199 m)

Telegraph City was an unincorporated town in Calaveras County, California, United States. It lies at an elevation of 653 feet (199 m). First named Grasshopper City when it was started in the early 1860s, it was renamed in the 1870s for its location on the telegraph line between Stockton and Sonora. A post office operated here from 1862 to 1894.

The town had copper mining nearby, and was the location of a large sheep and cattle ranching operation. The site is now abandoned, though fieldstone walls and foundations remain.

== See also ==
- List of ghost towns in California
