= Sawmill Flat, California =

Coordinates: 38°01′14″N 120°22′51″W

Sawmill Flat is a locale, formerly a settlement during the California Gold Rush, now a ghost town in Tuolumne County, California, United States. It lies at an elevation of 2,136 feet (651 meters), south of Martinez, another former gold rush settlement.

Sawmill Flat is a California Historical Landmark. California Historical Landmark number 424 reads:

NO. 424 SAWMILL FLAT - Its name derived from two sawmills erected here to supply mining timbers in the early 1850s, Sawmill Flat was rich in pocket gold in its heyday, population at one time was 1,000. The mining camp of a Mexican woman, Dona Elisa Martínez, at north end of the flat, is reported to have been a hideout of the famous bandit Joaquin Murieta. The legendary 'Battle of Sawmill Flat' would have taken place here.

== See also ==
- California Historical Landmarks in Tuolumne County, California
- List of ghost towns in California
