= Greenwater, California =

Unincorporated community in California, United States

Greenwater
- Ghost town
- Location in California Greenwater (the United States)
- Coordinates: 36°10′46″N 116°36′59″W
- Country: United States
- State: California
- County: Inyo
- Elevation: 4,288 ft (1,307 m)

Greenwater (formerly Ramsey, The Camp, and Kunze) was an unincorporated community near Death Valley, located on the eastern side of the Inyo County, California, United States. It is now a deserted ghost town.

== Geography ==
Greenwater is located 5.5 miles (8.9 km) north of Funeral Peak in the Funeral Mountains above southeastern Death Valley, at an elevation of 4,288 feet (1,307 m). It is now located within Death Valley National Park, north of Smith Mountain, and south of the Rand, California mining district ruins.

== History ==
Greenwater was a mining town in the Mojave Desert that saw its rise and fall within the first decade of the 20th century. Greenwater's first records date back to the year 1904, these records stated that there were claims that Greenwater dated back to the 1880s however no solid evidence or records were found.

The original townsite, "Kunze", named after its founder Arthur Kunze was located 2 miles (3.2 km) west of the current site. Kunze was abandoned in favor of the current site, which had the original name of "Ramsey". Greenwater had begun to become more and more operable to the point that a post office was needed and operated at Greenwater from 1906 to 1908.

Furnace was a tent city located between three and four miles west of Greenwater. Patrick Clark founded the Furnace Creek Copper Company at Furnace. Furnace was a boomtown by 1905, but deserted by 1907. The Furnace post office operated from 1907 to 1908. The postmaster was Sidney Norman, but the USPS has no evidence that the post office was ever in operation. Sidney Norman also operated the Furnace Townsite Co. out of a tent. The residents of Furnace abandoned the site and moved to Greenwater.

=== Copper and water ===
Founded around a copper ore strike in 1905 the town of Greenwater was a short-lived Death Valley community. So dry was its region that water had to be hauled 28 miles into the town. The lucrative business of water barrel salesman fetched any entrepreneur $15 (equivalent to about $490 in 2025) per barrel.

Greenwater's many copper mining companies were first mentioned on public records on the 4th of May, 1906. The last mentioned copper company in record books was mentioned on the 1st of September, 1909. The copper companies in Greenwater failed because there were so many different companies in such a small area (56 total listed). Of the 56 different copper companies listed, four were exposed as fraudulent companies. This further points to the failure of the companies, since there was such congestion mixed in with fraudulent leaders, there was a fall in the companies.

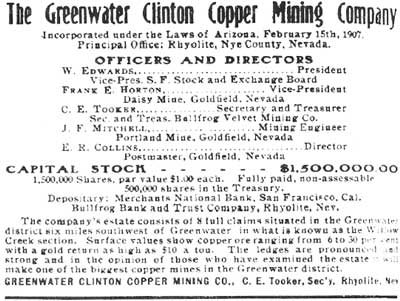
A typical Willow Creek mining advertisement, from the Death Valley Chuck-Walla.

Eventually the town grew to 2,000 people and became known for a local magazine, The Death Valley Chuckwalla. The Death Valley Chuckwalla was the magazine which exposed fraudulent companies as stated in the previous paragraph. By 1909 the copper mining had collapsed without ever turning a profit and the residents left town for other areas. Today, there is nothing left of Greenwater.

In 2000, the results of a study concerning the ecological recovery of the soil at Greenwater was reported. Robert Webb of the USGS compared the recovery of the soil at Skidoo, California with the recovery at Greenwater. He found that the soil at Skidoo recovered much more quickly than the soil at Greenwater because the soil at Skidoo was less than 4,000 years old whereas the soil at Greenwater was at least 100,000 years old. Webb stated that it took less time for the soil at Skidoo to recover to the earlier successional stage than the older soil at Greenwater. This research suggests that if the desert soil must be disturbed, then it is best to disturb younger soil sites.

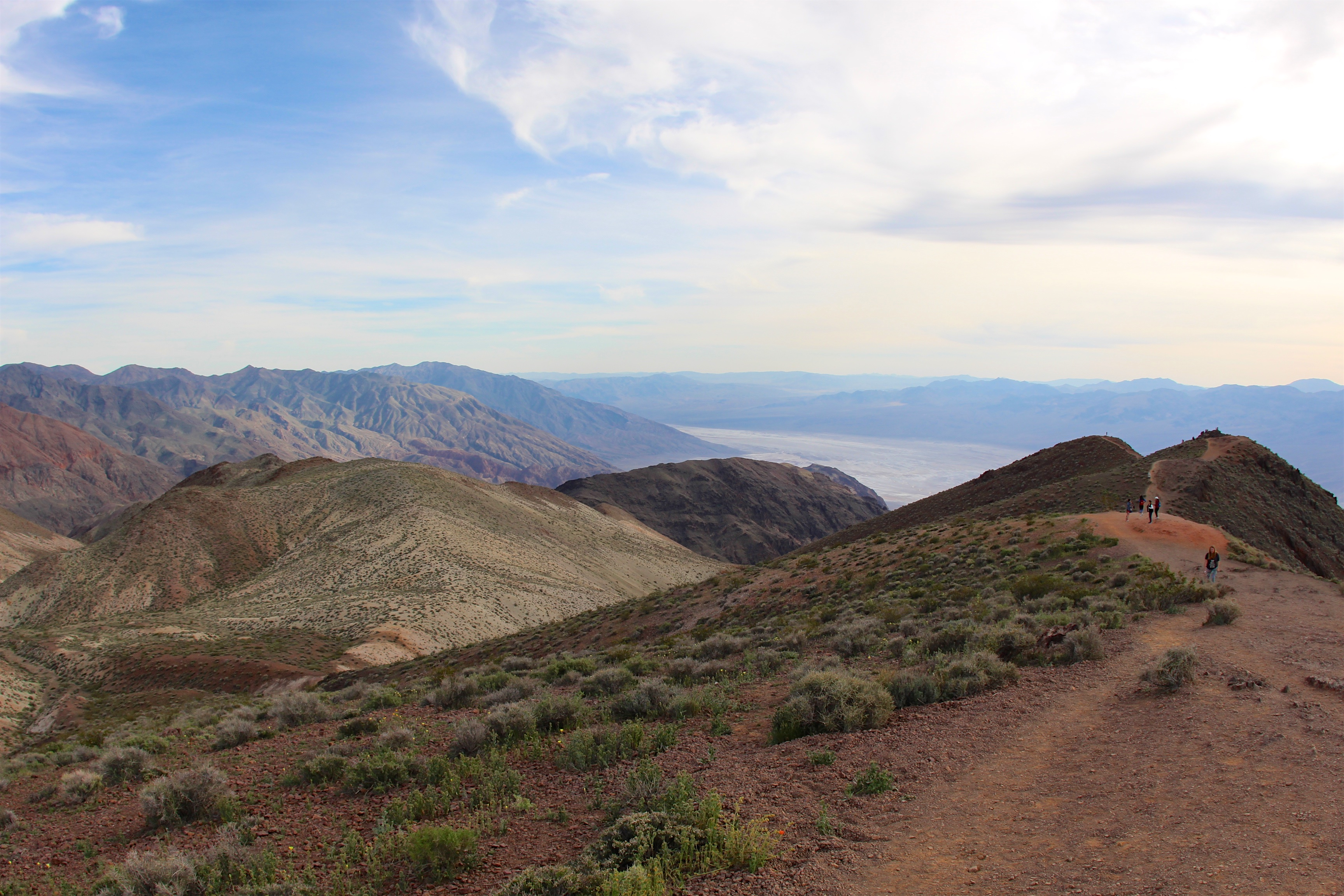
Dantes View @ Death Valley National Park, California

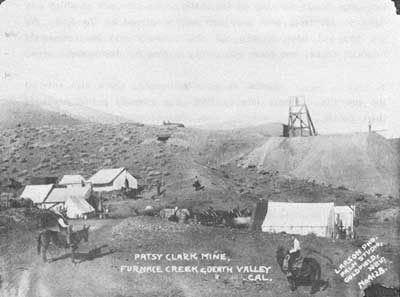
Greenwater California campsite.

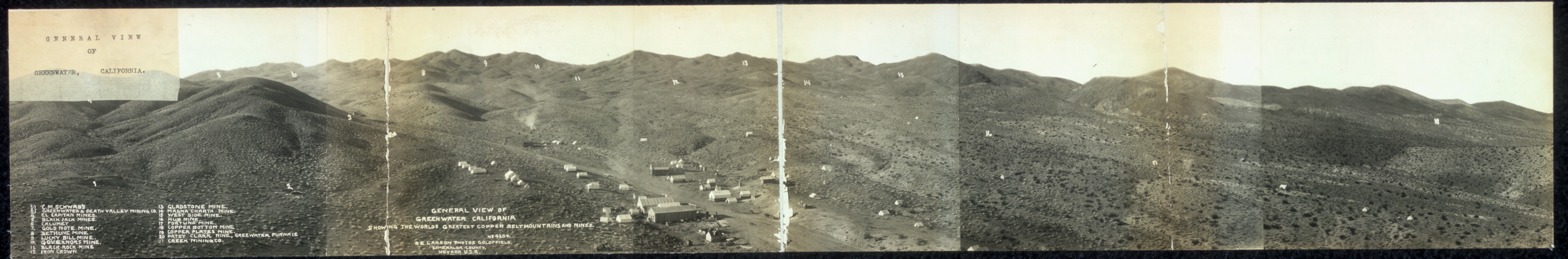
General view of Greenwater, California, showing the world's greatest copper belt, mountains and mines. (1906)
