= La Panza Canyon =

Canyon located in California

Coordinates: 35°22′20″N 120°8′34″W

La Panza Canyon is a valley in the La Panza Range in San Luis Obispo County, California. Its mouth is at an elevation of 1509 feet (460m).

This canyon was the site of a gold strike and gold rush in 1878, that led to the founding of La Panza, California.

== See also ==
- Lingo Canyon
