= Petersburg, California =

Petersburg
- Ghost town
- Location in California
- Coordinates: 35°36′09″N 118°36′13″W
- Country: United States
- State: California
- County: Kern
- Elevation: 4,731 ft (1,442 m)

Petersburg (also Petersburgh and Greenhorn) is a former settlement in Kern County, California, United States. It was located on Greenhorn Creek, 4.5 miles (7.2 km) west-northwest of Miracle Hot Springs, at an elevation of 4731 feet (1442 m). Petersburg still appeared on maps as of 1956.

A post office operated at Petersburgh from 1858 to 1863. The place was named for Peter Gardett, early merchant there.
