= La Panza, California =

Ghost town in California

La Panza
- Ghost town
- Location within the state of California
- Coordinates: 35°21′40″N 120°12′56″W
- Country: United States
- State: California
- County: San Luis Obispo
- Elevation: 1,880 ft (570 m)
- Time zone: UTC−8 (Pacific (PST))
  - Summer (DST): UTC−7 (PDT)
- GNIS feature ID: 1660863

La Panza (Spanish for "the paunch") is a former settlement and gold-mining boom town in San Luis Obispo County, California, United States. It lies in the La Panza Range at an elevation of 1,880 feet (573 m). The name comes from the practice of Californio vaqueros at nearby ranchos, who used the paunch and other parts of slaughtered beef as bait to trap grizzly bears, once common in the range. The location was recorded in 1828 as paraje la panza, "the paunch place". Placer gold found in La Panza Canyon in 1878 drew a short-lived rush; the town had a post office from 1879 to 1908, and one dilapidated building survives on private land.

== History ==
The La Panza Range, in which the town stood

Placer mining is thought to have been carried on in the district as early as the beginning of the nineteenth century, by Mexican and Indian miners. The discovery of placer gold in La Panza Canyon in 1878 began a small gold rush, and La Panza grew into a mining town. It had a post office from November 4, 1879, to June 15, 1908.

The rush lasted several years. Output for 1888 was valued at more than $100,000. Small-scale mining continued through the early 1900s, with renewed activity in the 1930s and early 1940s; total production for the district has been estimated at about $200,000.

== Mining district ==
The La Panza district is a placer-mining district in east-central San Luis Obispo County, about 40 miles (64 km) east of San Luis Obispo. It covers the ground around the town site, east of the crest of the range, together with the Pozo area to the west.

Most of the gold came from San Juan Creek, which flows north along the eastern flank of the range, and from its tributaries; the richest were Navajo, McGinnis, Placer and Hay creeks. West of the summit, gold was recovered from Pozo, Frazer and Toro creeks and possibly from the upper Salinas River. The placer deposits were small and discontinuous but locally rich, and the gold was fairly coarse and irregular.

== The site today ==
One dilapidated building remains at the site, on private property, and can be seen from Pozo Road. Placer and quartz claims are still worked in the vicinity. Bulletin 193 likewise records that a few old buildings remained in the area.

== See also ==
- Carrizo Plain
