= Ashford Mill (California) =

- Former settlement
- Location in California
- Coordinates: 35°55′08″N 116°41′05″W
- Country: United States
- State: California
- County: Inyo County
- Elevation: −121 ft (−37 m)

Ashford Mill is a former mill in Inyo County, California. It was located in Death Valley, at an elevation of 121 feet (37 m) below sea level. The place is now protected ruins within Death Valley National Park.

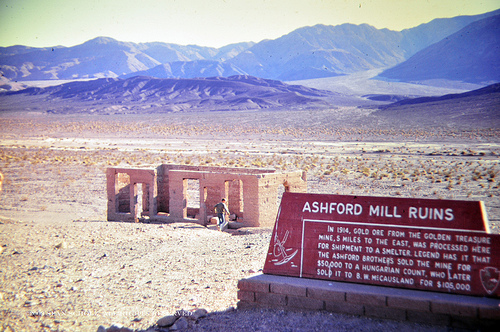
The ruins of Ashford Mill in 1970. They have deteriorated substantially since.

The original mill at the site was built in 1914 by brothers named Ashford. The ore was processed here from the Golden Treasure Mine 5 miles to the east in the Amargosa Range, and processed for further smelting.

== See also ==
- List of ghost towns in California
