= Masonic, California =

Masonic
- Ghost town
- Location in California Masonic (the United States)
- Coordinates: 38°21′45″N 119°06′45″W
- Country: United States
- State: California
- County: Mono

Masonic (formerly Lorena) is a ghost town located approximately 10 miles (16 km) northeast of Bridgeport in Mono County, California, United States. The town consists of an upper, middle, and lower town; most of the few ruins remaining are in the middle town. Gold was first discovered in the 1860s, but production ceased near the start of the 20th century. The town's population peaked at about 1,000.

== History ==
The town was founded by Freemasons, hence its name. Middle Town, the largest of the three towns, had a post office, boarding house, and a general store. It also housed the offices of the town's newspaper: The Masonic Pioneer.

The Lorena post office opened in 1905, changed its name to Masonic in 1906, closed in 1912, re-opened in 1913 and closed for good in 1927.

Masonic's population in 1906 was about 500. The principal mine, called the Pittsburg-Liberty Mine, produced $700,000 in gold before closing in 1910. By 1911, Masonic was in decline, although some mines kept in production until the 1920s.

== See also ==
- List of ghost towns in California
