= Liberty, San Joaquin County, California =

Ghost town in California, USA

Coordinates: 38.2402°N 121.2900°W

Liberty is a ghost town in San Joaquin County, in the U.S. state of California.

== History ==
Liberty was established in 1852. A post office was opened at Liberty in 1860, and remained in operation until 1874. With the construction of the railroad in the late 1860s, business activity shifted to nearby Galt, and the town's population dwindled. As of 2024, the Galt Historical Society maintains The Liberty cemetery which is east of highway 99 at Liberty Road.

== See also ==
- List of ghost towns in California
