= Packwood Station, California =

American ghost town and former settlement

Packwood Station was a settlement established in Tulare County, California, United States in 1857, on the Stockton - Los Angeles Road. From 1858 to 1861, it was a stagecoach station on the Butterfield Overland Mail route, 12 miles southeast of Visalia and 14 miles north of Tule River Station.

The exact site of the settlement is unknown. It lay on land owned by the prosperous cattleman Elisha Packwood. In the winter of 1861 - 1862, the station, Packwood's cattle and all his other property were swept away in the flood waters of the Great Flood of 1862. His once fertile land was buried in sand, making the vicinity worthless and the site unrecognizable. Losing all his net worth of $40,000 and nearly his life, Packwood moved to Oregon to attempt to rebuild his fortune.

== See also ==
- List of ghost towns in California
