= Norristown, California =

Coordinates: 38°33′28″N 121°25′04″W

Norristown, or Hoboken, was an ephemeral California Gold Rush settlement and steamboat landing on the American River in present-day Sacramento County, California, United States.

== History ==
It was located on the south bank of the American River, four miles east of Sacramento on a road leading to the gold fields, that later became L Street, in the vicinity of what is now the California State University Sacramento.

Norristown was built above the reach of flooding by the river, unlike Sacramento below it. During the flooding of Sacramento in 1852–53 it began as a settlement called Hoboken, for citizens of Sacramento who fled the inundation of their city. Sam Norris who owned the land tried to make it a permanent settlement, however most of the refugees returned to Sacramento and Norristown failed to grow and soon vanished.

== See also ==
- Mining communities of the California Gold Rush
