= North Muroc, California =

North Muroc
- Former settlement
- Location in California
- Coordinates: 35°00′18″N 117°49′08″W
- Country: United States
- State: California
- County: Kern
- Elevation: 2,290 ft (698 m)

North Muroc is a former settlement in Kern County, California, United States. It was located 8 miles (13 km) south-southeast of Castle Butte, at an elevation of 2290 feet (698 m). North Muroc still appeared on maps as of 1947.
