= Mercuryville, California =

Mercuryville
- Mercuryville, California
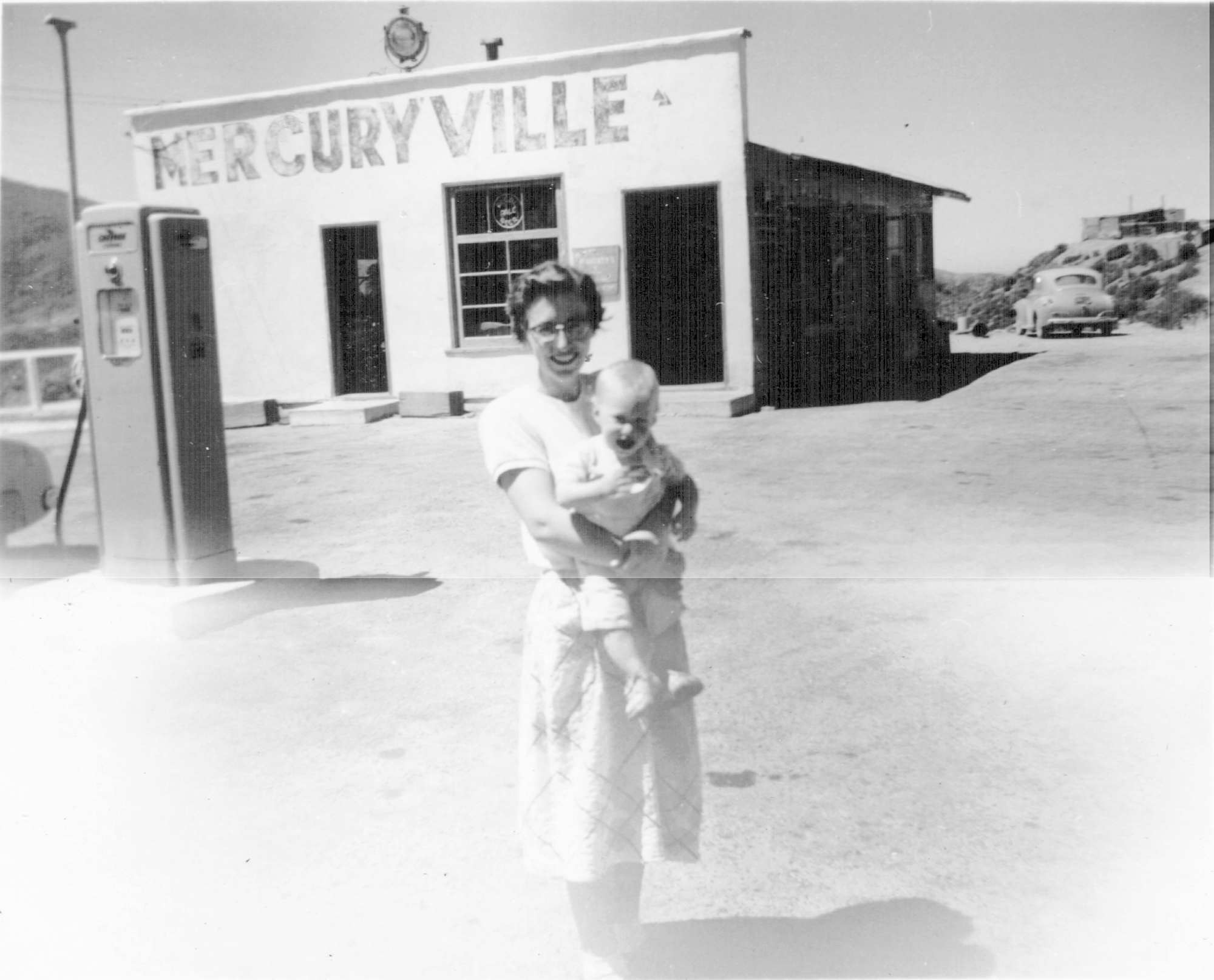
- The town of Mercuryville in 1956

- Location within California
- Coordinates: 38°46′34″N 122°50′22″W
- Country: United States
- State: California

Mercuryville, California is a ghost town in the Mayacamas Mountains of Sonoma County, California along The Geysers road.

== History ==
Mercuryville was founded in 1874, after cinnabar, a mercury-bearing ore, was discovered in eastern Sonoma County around 1870. Mercury is a dense liquid metal that can be used to separate gold from other less dense materials. The California Gold Rush, which had begun only 20 years earlier, increased the demand and price of mercury to $1 a pound—approximately $20 in 2018 dollars—making ore extraction profitable and prompting a short-lived mercury rush in the 1870s. When the price of ore dropped within a few years, most mines were quickly abandoned. In its heyday, the town had eight bars that were notorious for fights, and a single church. Mercury was also mined in other areas of Sonoma County at the time, including mines near Guerneville.

As per the name of the town, mercury was its primary economic engine and there were several mines in the area. The nearby Socrates Mine, about 5 miles west of Mercuryville, produced mercury-bearing ores including: cinnabar, montroydite, edgarbaileyite, magnesite, and tiemannite. The mine also bore other minerals including chalcedony, opal, and pyrite. The area has considerable geothermal resources, with active fumaroles and hot springs. Located nearby is the Geysers, the world's largest geothermal energy generation facility that provides 725 megawatts of electricity; it produces enough electricity to power the city of San Francisco.

By 1963 the settlement of Mercuryville had diminished in population to a population of two, and the town then consisted of a gas station/store that doubled as a home for an elderly couple. By this time the nearby Geysers resort was rundown with a main pool and a few smaller gender-segregated pools. By the mid-1960s the gas station had closed and Mercuryville had become a ghost town. One of the last remaining large mine buildings was burned in wildfires in the mid-1970s, although some concrete structures and metalwork from the mines remain.

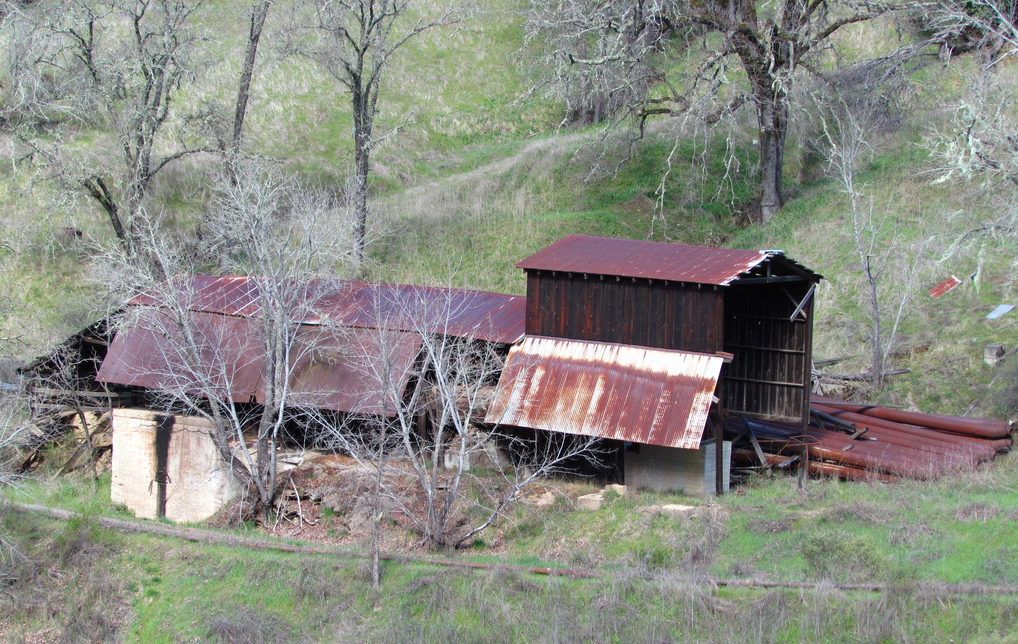
Abandoned quicksilver mine near Mercuryville, California

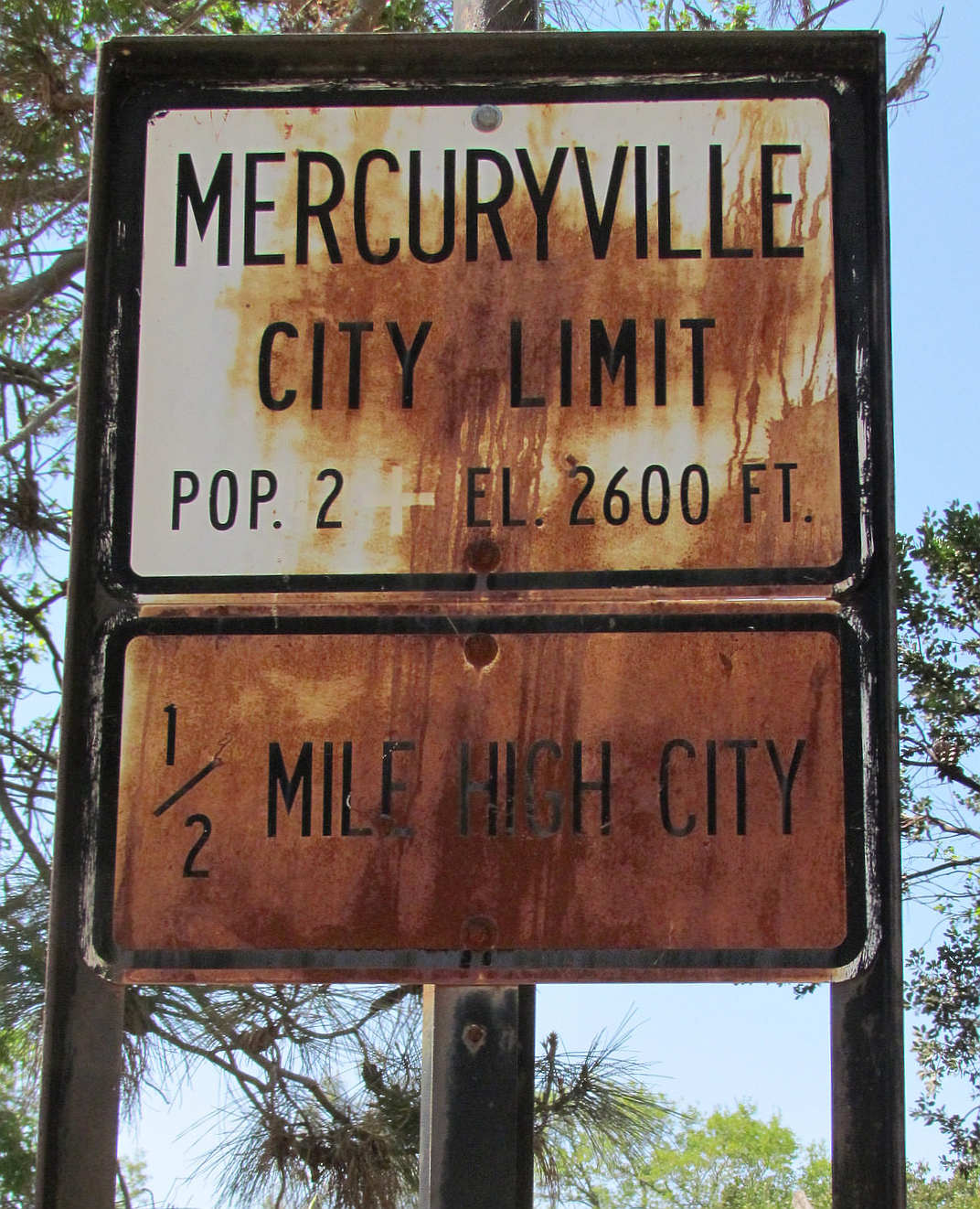
Mercuryville City limits road sign from the 1950s
