= Narka, California =

Coordinates: 35°53′51.8″N 117°54′04.4″W

Narka is a former settlement in Inyo County, California, United States. It was located on the Southern Pacific Railroad, approximately 3.5 miles (5.6 km) south of the current settlement of Little Lake. Narka, also known as siding 20, was created in February 1909 to support construction of the Los Angeles Aqueduct camp at Soda Hill. Narka began as a railroad camp before Little Lake was settled. A post office operated at Narka from 1909 to 1913, when the service was transferred to Little Lake. Narka was abandoned on March 15, 1935.

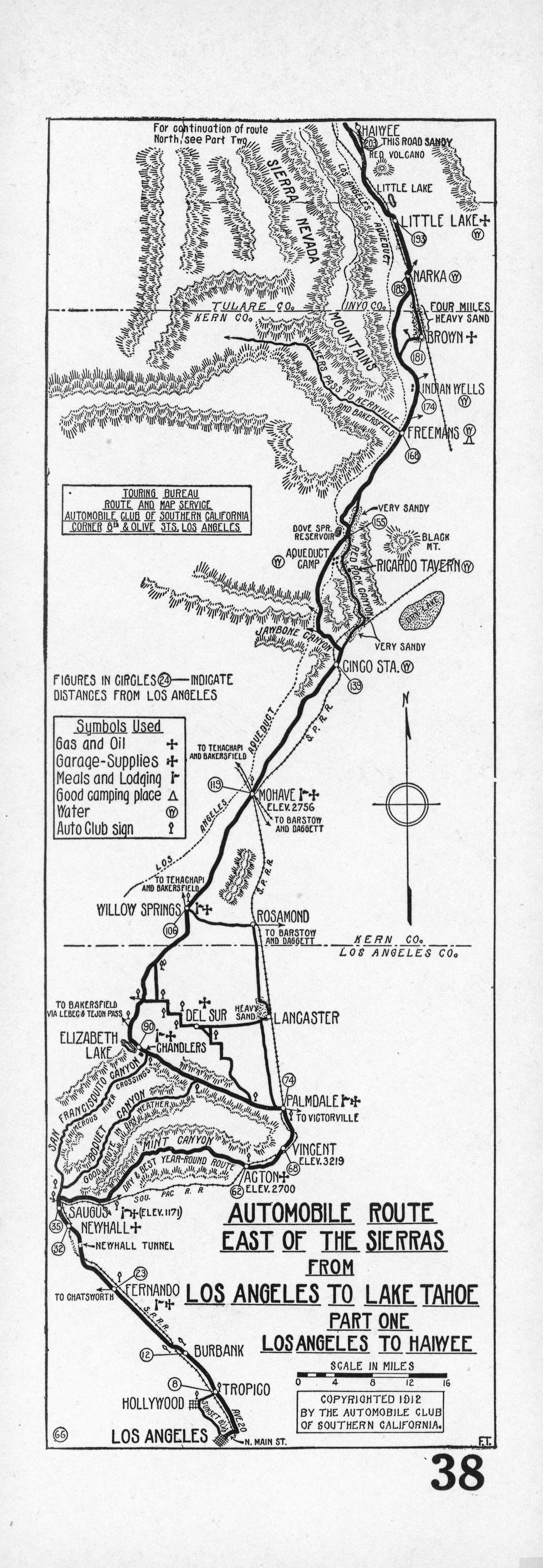
Automobile route east of the Sierras from Los Angeles to Lake Tahoe. Part one: Los Angeles to Haiwee, 1912. Narka is shown at the upper left.

== See also ==
- List of ghost towns in California
