= Chloride City, California =

Chloride City
- Ghost town
- Location in California
- Coordinates: 36°42′24″N 116°52′56″W
- Country: United States
- State: California
- County: Inyo
- Elevation: 4,770 ft (1,454 m)

Chloride City is a ghost town in Inyo County, California, United States. It is located 8.5 miles (14 km) north-northeast of Beatty Junction, at an elevation of 4,770 ft (1,450 m). The former settlement is in Death Valley National Park.

The town was established in 1905 when the Bullfrog, Nevada, gold discovery brought people into the area. The ghost town contains numerous adits, waste dumps, three stamp mills and the grave of James McKay,about whom nothing is further recorded.

== See also ==
- List of ghost towns in California
