= Newtown, Mariposa County, California =

Newtown
- Former settlement
- Location in California
- Coordinates: 37°42′12″N 120°11′31″W
- Country: United States
- State: California
- County: Mariposa
- Elevation: 1,821 ft (555 m)

Newtown is a former settlement in Mariposa County, California, United States. It lay at an elevation of 1821 feet (555 m).
