= White Mountain City, California =

Ghost town in California, United States

Coordinates: 37°24′42″N 117°59′51″W

White Mountain City (WMC) is a ghost town at the mouth of Wyman Canyon in Deep Springs Valley in Inyo County, California, United States. The site is on a dirt road east of CA-168 near the Nevada border. Today, White Mountain City is marked by some ruins.

== History ==
Information of White Mountain City's existence appears to only come from a single letter published in The Sacramento Union on March 28, 1864, promoting mining activity in the area and states that the town was laid out by Lieutenant W.A. Oliver and surveyed by L.F. Cooper. Several buildings had been erected and others were under construction when the letter was written. The author of the Sacramento Union letter (“D.Q.C.”) asserted that he visited WMC due to a desire to visit the famous “Deep Spring precinct where the heavy vote was recorded for Judge Quint two years and a half ago which gave rise to the famous contested election case…” The first modern historian to write about the contested election, W.A. Chalfant, took D.Q.C's letter at face value and concluded that WMC was: 1) the site of the voter fraud which led to the contested election; and 2) must have existed as early as 1861, when the fraud occurred.

However, the letter may be unreliable and misleading. A close reading of the testimony given to the legislature in the contested election makes it clear that neither conclusion is correct. The fraudulent ballots were those of the “Big Springs precinct,” not “Deep Spring precinct” and the “Big Springs precinct,” had it existed, was at a mining camp at the headwaters of Cottonwood Creek, not White Mountain City.

Over 36 people, largely prospectors and outfitters, gave evidence to the investigating elections committees of the legislature and not a single one mentioned White Mountain City. Prospectors testified that the only habitation in the White Mountains was a cabin at the head of Cottonwood Creek and that the nearest place to the White Mountains to get supplies was the town of Aurora – not White Mountain City.

== See also ==
- List of ghost towns in California
