= Sunland, Inyo County, California =

Sunland
- Former settlement
- Location in California
- Coordinates: 37°19′57″N 118°24′16″W
- Country: United States
- State: California
- County: Inyo
- Elevation: 4,209 ft (1,283 m)

Sunland is a former settlement in Inyo County, California, United States. It lay at an elevation of 4209 feet (1283 m).

== See also ==
- List of ghost towns in California
