= Rovana, California =

Unincorporated community in California, United States

Rovana
- Unincorporated community
- Location in California Rovana (the United States)
- Coordinates: 37°24′46″N 118°36′55″W
- Country: United States
- State: California
- County: Inyo
- Elevation: 5,141 ft (1,567 m)

Rovana is an unincorporated community in Inyo County, California, United States. It is located at the western edge of Owens Valley, 5.5 miles (8.9 km) north-northeast of Mount Tom, at an elevation of 5141 feet (1567 m).

== History ==
Rovana was established in 1947, when the US Vanadium corporation purchased the former Foreman Ranch near the mouth of Pine Creek Canyon as a housing site for workers at their high-altitude Pine Creek Mine, which had expanded due to military demand for tungsten during World War II. By 1951 there were 85 houses in Rovana and later another 50, all still in use. Most were transported there from further up the canyon, where earlier mine-worker housing was vulnerable to heavy snow, avalanches, earthquakes, and mud slides. The name came from "Ro" for Round Valley and "vana" for US Vanadium. The streets were named from states of the Union matching the letters in "vanadium" (such as Nevada, Utah, and Montana).

The village of Scheelite, located closer to the Pine Creek Mine, was another company town for the mine. The town was named for scheelite, one of the main tungsten ores.

== Climate ==
This region experiences warm (but not hot) and dry summers, with no average monthly temperatures above 71.6 °F. According to the Köppen Climate Classification system, Rovana has a warm-summer Mediterranean climate, abbreviated "Csb" on climate maps.
