= Olig, California =

Olig
- Former settlement
- Location in California
- Coordinates: 35°19′30″N 119°39′23″W
- Country: United States
- State: California
- County: Kern
- Elevation: 1,030 ft (314 m)

Olig is a former settlement in Kern County, California, United States. It was located 2 miles (3.2 km) northwest of McKittrick, at an elevation of 1030 feet (314 m). Olig still appeared on maps as of 1912.

Olig is within the boundaries of the huge McKittrick Oil Field, and gives its name to one of the oil pools within the unit, which was also the first to be discovered (1896).
