= Wiskala, California =

Former Awani settlement in California

Wiskala (also Wis-kul-la and Wisoulla) is a former Awani settlement in Mariposa County, California, United States.

It was located at the foot of Royal Arches in Yosemite Valley.
