= Saltus, California =

Abandoned mining town in San Bernardino County, California, USA

Coordinates: 34°32′15″N 115°41′24″W

Saltus is an abandoned mining town in San Bernardino County in the Mojave Desert that supported salt mining and evaporating in the Bristol Dry Lake Bed.

Saltus on a map of California.

== Climate ==
Saltus is classified as a hot desert under the Köppen climate classification.

== Remains ==
Despite Saltus's long-standing desolation, few remnants of the town still exist, including a few small empty buildings (including Saltus Mill) and a nearby desert well with a source of groundwater a significantly short distance beneath the desert surface. The abandoned mines and salt evaporation ponds of the Leslie Salt Company and National Chloride Company are also in the nearby area, as well as the Bristol Lake Quarry a bit farther away.

== Geology ==
While salt is the main mineral product of Saltus, anhydrite, antarcticite, calcite, celestine, gypsum, alluvium, and halite deposits can also be found in the region. There is also a reported gold prospect about 8.6 miles away from Saltus, at an opening in the surface of Bristol Lake.

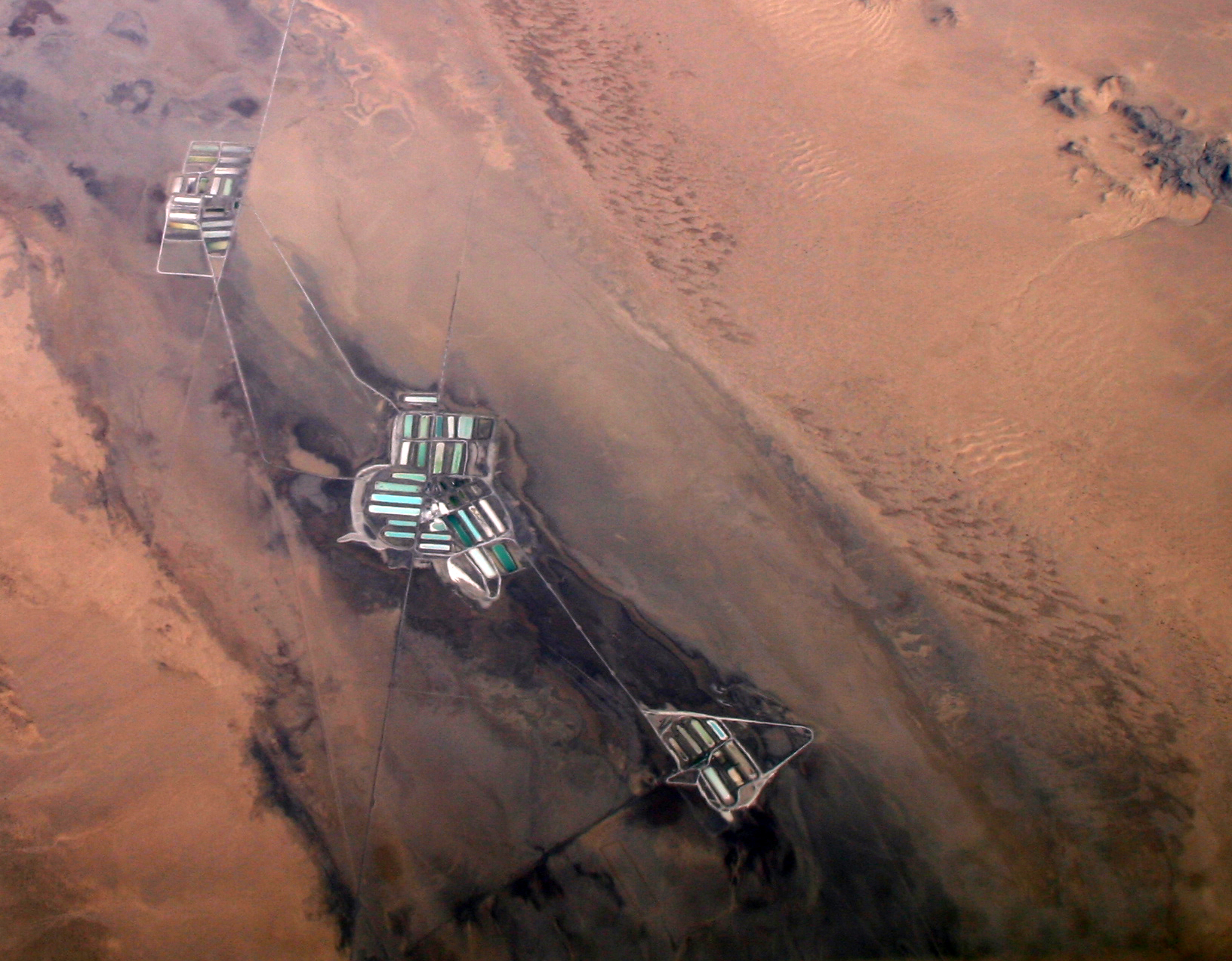
The Cadiz Salt Evaporation ponds in the Bristol Dry Lake near Saltus.
