= Deadwood, Trinity County, California =

Deadwood
- Ghost town
- Location within California Location within the United States
- Coordinates: 40°43′10″N 122°44′01″W
- Country: United States
- State: California
- County: Trinity
- Elevation: 2,835 ft (864 m)
- GNIS feature ID: 1655958

Deadwood is a ghost town in Trinity County, California, United States.

== Namesake ==
Deadwood was named from adjacent forests of dead timber.

== History ==
The former town started around 1851 and lasted till the post office was closed in 1915. The post office was open from 1881 to 1915.

In 1880 The brown bear mine was established in Deadwood.

== See also ==
- Trinity County, California
