= Minersville, California =

- Ghost town
- Location within California Location within the United States
- Coordinates: 40°51′05″N 122°46′59″W
- Country: United States
- State: California
- County: Trinity
- Elevation: 2,372 ft (723 m)
- GNIS feature ID: 1683051

Minersville is a ghost town in Trinity County, California, United States. The town was flooded by the creation of Trinity Lake.

== Demographics ==
Historical population
| Census | Pop. | Note | %± |
|---|---|---|---|
| 1860 | 80 | | — |
| 1870 | 102 | | 27.5% |
U.S. Decennial Census; 1850–1870 1880-1890; 1900 1910 1920; 1930 1940 1950; 1960 1970 1980; 1990 2000 2010

== See also ==
- List of ghost towns in California
