= Sunland Park =

Sunland Park may refer to:

- Sunland Park, New Mexico
- Sunland Park Racetrack & Casino, in Sunland Park, New Mexico
- Sunland Park Mall, in El Paso, Texas
- Sunland Park, in Sunland, California
