= Sablon, California =

Ghost town in San Bernardino County, California, USA

Coordinates: 34°10′29″N 114°59′39″W

Sablon is an abandoned town located along Cadiz Road, at the ASTF Parker cutoff. Sablon is part of San Bernardino County, California, and is in the Turtle Mountains of the Mojave Desert. Sablon is 3 miles away from Johnsons Well.

Sablon on a map of California.

== History ==
A station along the Santa Fe line from Cadiz was established in 1909 and was originally called Rudolph. In 1912 it was renamed to Sablon, after the Spanish "sablón" meaning "gravel".

== Geology ==
Sablon Mine is a gold and silver prospect in the surrounding desert.

Local rocks near the mine include Precambrian igneous rock and metamorphic rock.

== Climate ==
Sablon Mine's local region is classified as a hot desert under the Köppen climate classification.
