= The Blind Owl Band =

American band

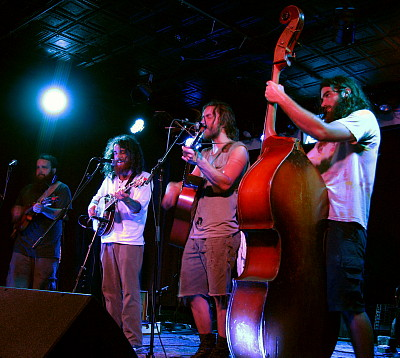
- The Blind Owl Band on stage at The Saint, Asbury Park, NJ on July 19, 2013.

Background information
- Origin: Saranac Lake, New York, United States
- Genres: Folk, Folk rock, Country rock, Bluegrass
- Years active: 2011–present
- Members: Arthur Buezo; Christian Cardiello; James Ford; Eric Munley
- Website: http://www.theblindowlband.com/

The Blind Owl Band is an American bluegrass-rock-country-folk band formed by four friends in Saranac Lake, New York, in 2011. The members of the band are Arthur Buezo (guitar, vocals), Christian Cardiello (bass), James Ford (banjo, vocals), and Eric Munley, (mandolin, vocals).

The band has been described as having an early 70's look (long hair, heavily bearded) and compared to New Grass Revival. Their music has been described as "bluegrass with teeth." The band prefers the term "original string music." According to Munley, the term "bluegrass" is associated with rules and techniques that Blind Owl's music doesn't follow. Their music combines many genres with a strong traditional string music and bluegrass base. The band's influences include the Allman Brothers, Bob Dylan, Jaco Pastorius, The Whompers, classical and flamenco guitar. They play so furiously that they frequently snap strings.

== History ==
None of them were planning to have a music career until they met at Paul Smith's College in the Adirondacks, where they were students in their early 20s. The band got its name from an incident that occurred while playing at the college. They had just finished playing a song, when a saw-whet owl flew into a window. The owl got up and just stared at them for a minute, then flew away. A saw-whet is also called a "blind owl," and so the band was named.

=== First album - Rabble Rousing (2012) ===
The band's first album was released in January 2012 and is titled "Rabble Rousing" (2012). The 13-track CD, was recorded by Larry Dolan at Granary Studio in Morrisonville, New York. According to the Adirondack Daily Enterprise, "The young band had been together less than a year when it made its first album, "Rabble Rousing," which sounded as raucous as its title implied. It was recorded live, with everyone playing together, and it sounded like their shows: a throbbing mass, a huge "chunka-chunka-chunka" punctuated by Buezo's deep growl and Ford's high yowl. They trade leads to break it up a bit, but there's little emphasis on solos. They play as one but not bluegrass-tight - rather like a racing stagecoach with slack in the reins. They're all heart and gut and energy, playing the music of hobos, tramps, trail crews, river rafting guides and forestry students."

=== Second album - This Train We Ride is Made of Wood and Steel (2013) ===
The band's second album was released in July 2013. It is titled "This Train We Ride is Made of Wood and Steel." As original as the title, The Blind Owl Band presents their sophomore disc. A distinct set of vocal accompaniment would have one wondering if Tom Waits dropped in (he didn’t) for a batch of fiery bluegrass and dirty jams. Using traditional instrumentation, Arthur Buezo (guitar, vocals), Eric Munley (mandolin, vocals), James Ford (banjo, vocals) and Christian Cardiello (bass), all transplants to Saranac Lake, NY, draw upon their youthful influences mostly defined by their fathers’ flare for the good stuff. This Train We Ride is Made of Wood and Steel is a testament to their past whilst forging a path where their sound is becoming uniquely their own."

According to Upstate Live, "“Sailor Song,” whether intentional or not, exemplifies the magical undercurrent of the past popping up in today’s music. The disc intro gives a nod to a “House of the Rising Sun” look alike, but only for a few seconds. From this point forward, the disc launches into a fun-filled, fast-paced, barnburner, ho-down of a good time. They give a breather by slowing it down in “Missing My Home,” where Eastbound Jesus’, “Holy Smokes!” is given accolades. A bass solo introduces “Jazzy McGee,” in a tune that sounds just like its title. A neat little contrast in The Blind Owl Band is the depth of the tenor and bass vocals and the high-pitched use of the mandolin, where a balance is met and the band is defined. Between their first album and their submission to Couch by Couchwest, the Blind Owl Band was beginning to make a name for themselves as a rowdy, footloose bunch. Imagine my surprise when their sophomore album opened with a somber tune called "Sailor's Song." It sets the tone for the rest of the album—hard-driving and determined. That's not to say that the Owls have lost their sense of fun. There are plenty of boot-stompers on here. To the contrary, the Blind Owl Band is showing off their newfound maturity. But unlike other bands who create morose second albums to show off their Depth, the Blind Owl Band is simply devoting their manic energy in another direction. They still pick like it's their job, and they still sound like they've just arrived from the depths of Appalachia."

They have played with Trampled By Turtles, Railroad Earth, Hot Day at The Zoo, Floodwood, Jatoba, Driftwood, Cabinet, Lucid, Big Leg Emma, The Bloodroots Barter, Gold Town, Eastbound Jesus, and The Mallett Brothers.

During the 2010s, the ban played as many as 175 shows a years in 17 states.

=== Hiatus and further shows ===
The band took a hiatus in September 2021 but began performing again in early 2025.

== Band members ==
- Arthur Buezo (guitar, vocals)
- Christian Cardiello (bass, guitar)
- James Ford (banjo, vocals)
- Eric Munley (mandolin, vocals)

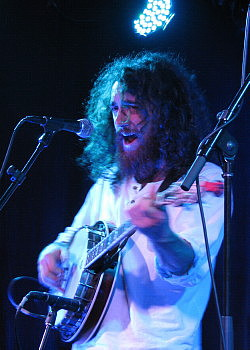
James Ford of The Blind Owl Band on banjo and vocals at The Saint in Asbury Park, NJ, July 2013

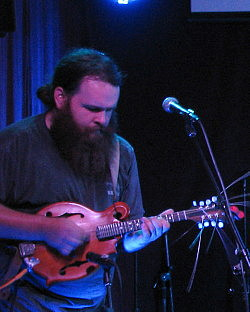
Eric Munley of The Blind Owl Band at The Saint in Asbury Park, NJ, July 2013

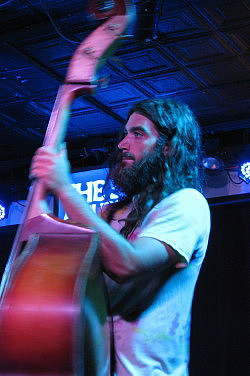
Christian Cardiello of The Blind Owl Band on bass at The Saint in Asbury Park, NJ, July 2013

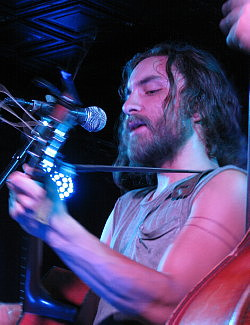
Arthur Buezo of The Blind Owl Band on guitar at The Saint in Asbury Park, NJ, July 2013
