= Providence, San Bernardino County, California =

Providence
- Ghost town
- Location within the state of California Providence (the United States)
- Coordinates: 34°58′49″N 115°30′19″W
- Country: United States
- State: California
- County: San Bernardino
- Time zone: UTC-8 (Pacific (PST))
  - Summer (DST): UTC-7 (PDT)

Providence was a short-lived silver mining town located in San Bernardino County, California, United States. It existed between 1880 and 1886.

== Location ==
The town of Providence was located on the east slope of the Providence Mountains. The site is just north of the Providence Mountain State Recreation Area.

== History ==
Parties of prospectors from Ivanpah found rich silver ore along the steep slopes of the Providence Mountains in the spring of 1880. The richest property turned out to be the Bonanza King, which was soon sold to a pair of sharps—Wilson Waddingham and Thomas Ewing—who had just bilked investors in a mining-stock scheme in Colorado.

Working with 150 men, the two rapidly opened up the Bonanza King and put up a 20-stamp mill. A post office was established in mid-1882. As Providence was a company camp, its business district remained limited to 2 general stores and 3 saloons. By 1882, the mine had produced $1.5 million in bullion.

For reasons that remain unclear, Waddingham and Ewing began to lay off workers. The mill burned in mid-1885. A 5-stamp mill was built at the nearby Perseverance Mine in 1886, but the price of silver continued to slip, and the post office closed in 1892.

The district enjoyed several important revivals. One company built a gasoline-powered 10-stamp mill just below the Bonanza King during 1906–1907. And during World War I, an Eastern company rebuilt the mill, put up a camp supplied with electricity and running water, and reopened the mine. Smaller revivals followed during the 1920s.
