= Gold Town, California =

Gold Town OarVille
- Former settlement
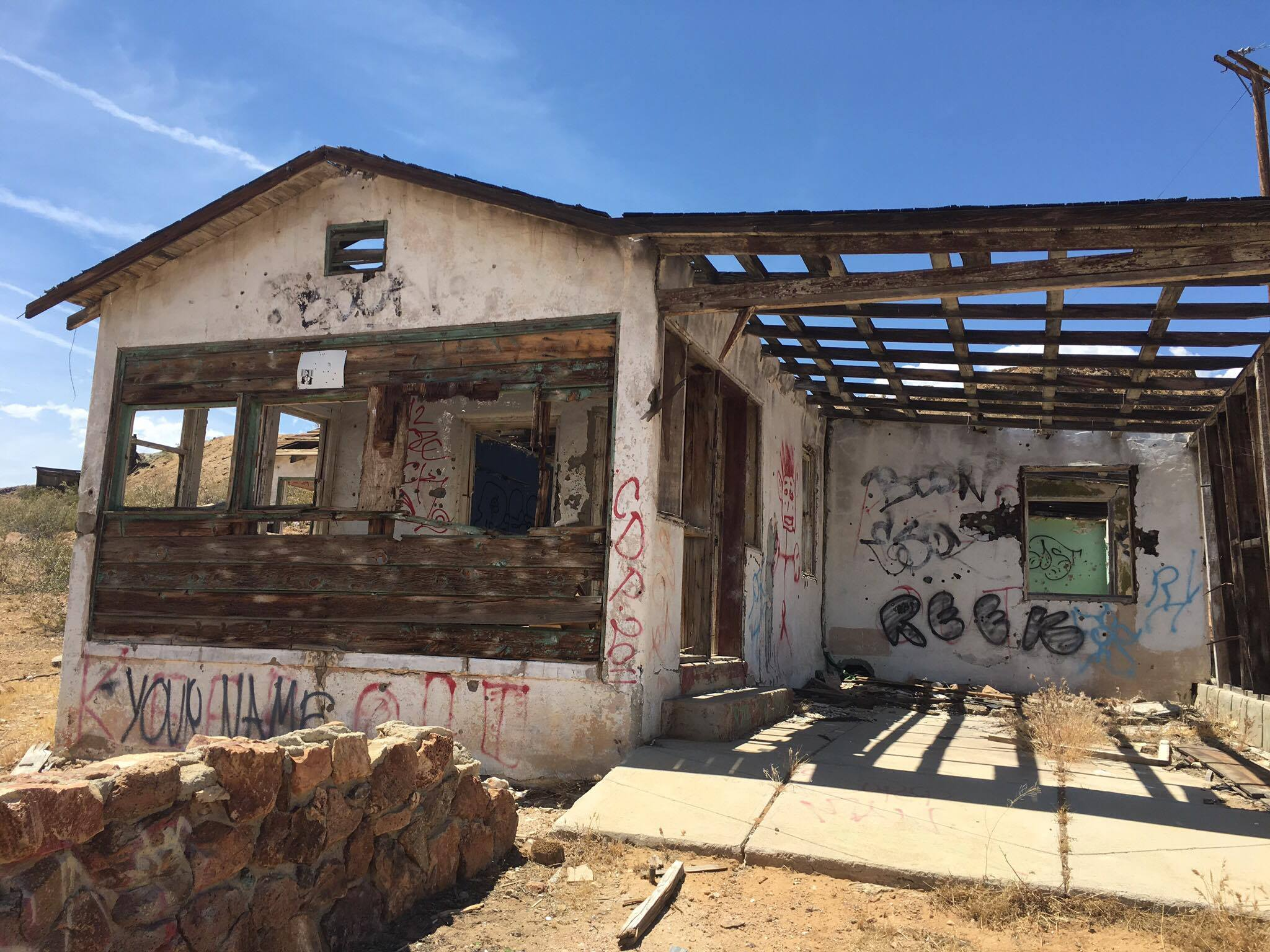
- An abandoned house in Goldtown

- Location in California
- Coordinates: 35°00′06″N 118°10′08″W
- Country: United States
- State: California
- County: Kern
- Elevation: 2,713 ft (827 m)

Gold Town (on topographic maps) or OarVille is a former settlement in Kern County, California, United States. It was located 9.5 miles (15 km) north of Rosamond, at an elevation of 2,713 feet (827 m).

Today, Gold Town exists only as a grid of dirt roads and a few abandoned buildings and mines in the desert off California State Route 14. Silver Queen Road is the main paved road that connects Gold Town to the California State Route 14.

Fleta, California is 0.62 miles (1.00 km) northeast of Gold Town. Mojave is 1.44 miles (2.32 km) to the north. Gold mines exist within 2 miles (3.2 km) to the north and south of Gold Town. These mines include the Golden Queen Mine and Elephant Eagle mine on Soledad Mountain south of Gold Town , and Whitmore Mine and Exposed Treasure mine on Standard Hill north of Gold Town. KHXT-FM (Mojave) radio tower, at an elevation of 3,028 feet (923 meters) above sea level, is 1.56 miles (2.51 km) southeast of Gold Town. The California Aqueduct Road is located about 5 miles (8.0 km) to the west of Gold Town.

== Golden Queen Mine ==
From the early 1900s to 1980s, the Golden Queen Mine was active on and off, using open pit, underground works, and heap leaching. About 100,000 short tons (91,000 t) of tailings were created over the years. Due to erosion since, some of these tailings reached the alluvial fan surface. The tailings contain elevated levels of arsenic. "Significant potential human health risks to the community and regional environmental impacts may have resulted from release of arsenic-bearing tailings into the waters of the state and airborne sources." according to the Bureau of Land Management.

Construction to reopen the Golden Queen Mine began in 2014 as part of the Soledad Mountain Project. The mine resumed processing in mid 2016.

In 2023 the precious mineral producer Andean acquired a 100% interest in Golden Queen Mining LLC. Open pit mining, cyanide heap leaching, and Merrill-Crowe processes are used to recover gold and silver from crushed, agglomerated ore. The heap leach pad for the mine is located near Gold Town, according to Kern County Planning and Community Development Department.
