= Quartzburg, Mariposa County, California =

Human settlement in United States of America

Coordinates: 37°32′22″N 120°12′16″W

Quartzburg (earlier Burns' Creek, Burns' Camp, Burns' Ranch, and Burns' Diggings) is a former settlement in Mariposa County, California, United States. It was located on Burns Creek, 2 miles (3.2 km) upstream from Hornitos.

John and Robert Burns settled at the site in 1847. A mining camp grew up. A post office operated at Quartzburg from 1851 to 1861. The name "Quartzburg" was bestowed by Thomas Thorn due to the quartz outcroppings at the place.

As the placer gold ran out in the early 1860s the population left, many to settle in nearby Hornitos. When the county road was built remaining ruins were bulldozed. One remaining trace of Quartzburg is its cemetery, on the north side of Burns Creek, on the north side of the county road.

== See also ==
- List of ghost towns in California
