= Quartzburg, Kern County, California =

Human settlement in California, United States

Coordinates: 35.6654°N 118.3992°W

Quartzburg is a former settlement in Kern County, California, United States. It was located 1 mile (1.6 km) north of the original site of Kernville, now inundated by Isabella Lake, except at low water. In 1873, Quartzburg was founded as a mining camp after gold production increased nearby.

Quartzburg was originally named Rogersville, and renamed due to the large amount of quartz in the area surrounding the town. Quartzville was a town based on temperance, causing saloon owner Adam Hamilton to move his saloon to Kernville, the rival town of Quartzburg since both towns shared the Big Blue Mine, which employed 200 people. In 1883, the mine burned down and activity in the mine was minimal until it finally ceased in 1907. Today, the former site of Quartzburg is submerged by Lake Isabella, although the cemetery still remains.

== See also ==
- List of ghost towns in California
