= Nashville, California =

Unincorporated community in California, United States

- Unincorporated community
- Location in California Nashville, California (the United States)
- Coordinates: 38°34′44″N 120°50′43″W
- Country: United States
- State: California
- County: El Dorado
- Elevation: 863 ft (263 m)

Nashville (formerly Nashville Bar, Quartzville, and Quartzburg) is an unincorporated community in El Dorado County, California, United States. It is located on the North Fork of the Cosumnes River, 10.5 miles (17 km) south of Placerville, at an elevation of 863 feet (263 m).

The place was first called Nashville Bar, then Quartzville and Quartzburg, before being named for Nashville, Tennessee.

Described as "quite a busy town" in 1852, Nashville had a store and boarding house in support of the nearby mines. The nearby Montezuma mine operated into the 1930s, at which time Nashville still had hundreds of residents, a school, and post office; by 1977 all but one business were gone and only thirteen residents remained.

A post office operated in Nashville from 1852 to 1854 and from 1870 to 1907.
