= Department of Agriculture v. Moreno =

- Supreme Court of the United States

Argued April 23, 1973 Decided June 25, 1973
- Full case name: United States Department of Agriculture, et al. v. Moreno, et al.
- Citations: 413 U.S. 528 (more) 93 S. Ct. 2821; 37 L. Ed. 2d 782; 1973 U.S. LEXIS 33

Case history
- Prior: 345 F. Supp. 310 (D.D.C. 1972).

Holding
- The "unrelated person" provision was irrelevant to the stated purpose of the Food Stamp Act and violated the Due Process Clause of the Fifth Amendment.

Court membership
- Chief Justice Warren E. Burger Associate Justices William O. Douglas · William J. Brennan Jr. Potter Stewart · Byron White; Thurgood Marshall · Harry Blackmun; Lewis F. Powell Jr. · William Rehnquist

Case opinions
- Majority: Brennan, joined by Douglas, Stewart, White, Marshall, Blackmun, Powell
- Concurrence: Douglas
- Dissent: Rehnquist, joined by Burger

Laws applied
- U.S. Const. amend. V; Food Stamp Act (7 USCS 2012(e))

Department of Agriculture v. Moreno, 413 U.S. 528 (1973), was a United States Supreme Court case that declared a provision of the Food Stamp Act denying food stamps to households of "unrelated persons" to be a violation of the U.S. Constitution. The Court held that provision to be irrelevant to the stated purpose of the statute and in violation of the Due Process Clause of the Fifth Amendment.

== Background ==
The case was brought by several groups of individuals; they alleged that they satisfied the income eligibility requirements for federal food assistance, but they were excluded from the program solely because the persons in each group were not all related to one another.

Eligibility for participation in the federal food stamp program was based on households rather than individuals. Under Section 3(e) of the Food Stamp Act (7 USC 2012(e)), the term "household" was defined to include only groups whose members were all related to one another.

The plaintiffs were members of groups of individuals with the need for food stamp assistance who were denied food stamps because the groups included members who were not all related to one another. For example, one plaintiff, a 56-year-old diabetic woman, lived with, shared common living expenses with, and received medical care from another woman with three children, each woman receiving a small monthly income from public assistance. Another plaintiff, an indigent married woman with three children, took in a 20-year-old girl, who was unrelated to them, because they felt that she had emotional problems. Another plaintiff, whose daughter had an acute hearing deficiency and required special instruction in a school for the deaf, decided that to make the most of her limited resources, she would share an apartment near the school with another woman, each woman being a recipient of public assistance.

== Procedural history ==
In a class action in the United States District Court for the District of Columbia, the plaintiffs sought declaratory and injunctive relief against the enforcement of the unrelated person provision of Section 3(e).

A three-judge District Court panel was convened and held that Section 3(e) violated the Due Process Clause of the Fifth Amendment because it created a classification that achieved unintended results and was not relevant to the stated purpose of the Act or justifiable by reference to an independent purpose (345 F Supp 310). The US District Court for the District of Columbia held that the "related household" limitation of Section 3 of the Food Stamp Act of 1964, 7 U.S.C.S. § 2012(e), was invalid for violating the Due Process Clause of the Fifth Amendment as it created an irrational classification, in violation of the equal protection component of that clause.

== Decision ==
=== Majority opinion ===
In an opinion by Justice William J. Brennan Jr., the Supreme Court affirmed the lower courts' ruling that the statutory classification was invalid.

Under traditional equal protection analysis, a legislative classification must be sustained if the classification itself is "rationally related to a legitimate governmental interest." However, the Court held that the challenged classification, which excludes unrelated household members, did not rationally further the goal of preventing fraud.

While the Fifth Amendment contains no equal protection clause, it forbids discrimination that is so unjustifiable as to be violative of due process; hence, it nonetheless imposes various equal protection requirements on the federal government. That doctrine is commonly referred to as "reverse incorporation," as it is essentially the opposite of "incorporation", or the application of parts of the Bill of Rights (otherwise applicable only to the Federal government) to the states via the Fourteenth Amendment.

There was little legislative history to indicate the purposes of "unrelated person" provision of Section 3(e). What legislative history that did exist showed that this was intended to prevent "hippies" and "hippie communes" from participating in the food stamp program. However, a purpose to discriminate against hippies cannot, on its own, be a sufficient justification. Aside from this purpose, the Government argued that there was a legitimate government interest in minimizing fraud in the administration of the food stamp program. However, the classification acted to exclude not only those who were likely to abuse the program but also those who were in need of the aid but could not afford to alter their living arrangements so as to retain their eligibility.

The Court held that the "unrelated person" provision was irrelevant to the stated purpose of the Food Stamp Act. Because it did not operate to rationally further the prevention of fraud, it was not rationally related to furthering any legitimate government interest.

=== Concurring opinion ===
Justice William O. Douglas wrote a concurring opinion. He believed that since the unrelated-person provision of Section 3(e) affected people's First Amendment rights of association, the classification could only be sustained by showing compelling governmental interests. He did not believe that the standard was satisfied.

In addition, Douglas claimed that Section 3(e) was unconstitutional because of its invidious discrimination between one class composed of needy people, all related to one another, and another class composed of households that have one or more persons unrelated to the others but with the same degree of need.

=== Dissenting opinion ===
Justice William H. Rehnquist dissented from the Court's decision. In an opinion joined by Chief Justice Warren E. Burger, he believed the limitation that Congress enacted in Section 3(e) could, in the judgment of reasonable men, conceivably deny food stamps to members of households formed solely for the purpose of taking advantage of the food stamp program.

When the Court makes this "rational basis" evaluation, its goal is limited to determining whether there is any rational basis on which Congress could have made this decision. Making arguments against its purported rational basis is a responsibility for Congress.

Since the food stamp program was not intended to be a subsidy for every individual who desired low-cost food, it was a permissible congressional decision, consistent with the underlying policy of the Act. The fact that the limitation would have unfortunate, perhaps unintended, consequences beyond that did not make it unconstitutional. Recognizing a rational basis, Rehnquist opined that the law should be upheld as constitutional.

== See also ==
- Lyng v. Castillo, 477 U.S. 635 (1986)
