= Able-bodied Adults Without Dependents =

Welfare category in the United States

The term Able-bodied Adults Without Dependents (ABAWDs) refers to low income working adults in the United States who do not have dependents. The 1996 welfare law (P.L. 104–193) set categorical requirements for food stamp participation. Among these were restrictions on legal alien participation and participation by low income persons without dependents. The latter (formerly eligible based solely on low income) were made ineligible for food stamps if they received food stamps for 3 months during the preceding 3 years without working or participating in a work program for at least 20 hours a week, or without participating in a workfare program.
