= Kimmelman v. Morrison =

- Supreme Court of the United States

Argued March 5, 1986 Decided June 26, 1986
- Full case name: Irwin I. Kimmelman, Attorney General of New Jersey and John J. Rafferty, Superintendent, Rahway State Prison, v. Neil Morrison
- Docket no.: 84-1661
- Citations: 477 U.S. 365 (more) 106 S. Ct. 2574
- Argument: Oral argument

Case history
- Prior: Conviction, 1978, affirmed, State v. Morrison, A-4157-78 (NJ App.Div., Mar. 18, 1981), petition to appeal denied, State v. Morrison, 87 N.J. 368 (1981), postconviction petition denied, (NJ Law Div. 1982), habeas corpus petition granted, Morrison v. Kimmelman, 579 F. Supp. 796 (D. NJ 1984), affirmed in part and remanded in part, 752 F. 2d 918 (3rd Cir. 1985), certiorari granted, 474 U. S. 815 (1985)
- Subsequent: Habeas corpus petition granted, Morisson v. Kimmelman, 650 F. Supp. 801 (Dist. N.J. 1986)

Holding
- Stone v. Powell does not prohibit federal review of habeas petitions alleging that a valid Fourth Amendment claim was defaulted in state court due to ineffective assistance of counsel.

Court membership
- Chief Justice Warren E. Burger Associate Justices William J. Brennan Jr. · Byron White; Thurgood Marshall · Harry Blackmun; Lewis F. Powell Jr. · William Rehnquist; John P. Stevens · Sandra Day O'Connor

Case opinions
- Majority: Brennan, joined by White, Marshall, Blackmun, Stevens, and O'Connor
- Concurrence: Powell, joined by Burger and Rehnquist

Laws applied
- U.S. Const. amends. IV, VI

Kimmelman v. Morrison, 477 U.S. 365 (1986), was a decision of the U.S. Supreme Court that clarified the relationship of the right to effective assistance of counsel under the Sixth Amendment to other constitutional rights in criminal procedure. In this case, evidence against the defendant was probably seized illegally, violating the Fourth Amendment, but he lost the chance to argue that point due to his lawyer's ineffectiveness. The prosecution argued that the defendant's attempt to make a Sixth Amendment argument via a habeas corpus petition was really a way to sneak his procedurally defaulted Fourth Amendment claim in through the back door. The Court unanimously disagreed, and held that the Fourth Amendment issue and the Sixth Amendment issue represented different constitutional values, and had different requirements for prevailing in court, and therefore were to be treated separately by rules of procedure. Therefore, the habeas corpus petition could go forward. In its opinion, the Court also gave guidance on how to apply its decisions in Stone v. Powell and Strickland v. Washington.

On the substance of the defendant's habeas corpus petition, the Court affirmed the decision of the Third Circuit Court of Appeals, which had said that half of Strickland's requirements were satisfied, and the other half would need to be reviewed by a trial court.

== Legal context ==
In 1976, the Supreme Court decided Stone v. Powell, holding that state prisoners who claimed the exclusionary rule had been violated in their cases, but already had "full and fair" hearings on the issue in state court, could not have the issue re-heard via habeas corpus petitions in federal court. Part of the Court's reasoning had been that the exclusionary rule was not a personal right, but a general way to deter infringement of the Fourth Amendment right "to be secure...against unreasonable searches and seizures". That meant it had less weight than individual trial rights when weighed against the social costs of redundant litigation that "often frees the guilty" and "may well have the..effect of generating disrespect for the law and administration of justice".

Over the next few years, there was disagreement among courts and legal scholars as to how far this ruling should apply, particularly when a defense attorney had incompetently failed to make a Fourth Amendment claim. Some felt that habeas corpus petitions should still be available, as the Sixth Amendment (incompetence) issue was separate from the Fourth Amendment issue, but others reasoned that the Fourth Amendment issue was the root cause in both scenarios, and therefore habeas corpus petitions should be barred.

== Procedural history in lower courts ==
=== Trial ===
In 1978, Neil Morrison was indicted for raping a child, namely a 15-year-old girl who had worked for him. During the six-day trial in 1979, the prosecution's evidence included testimony from the victim, the victim's mother, the detective who had handled the investigation, and laboratory technicians who had examined physical evidence recovered by the detective. That physical evidence included a bedsheet from Morrison's bed, from which the technicians had recovered incriminating hair, blood, and semen samples. When the bedsheet was introduced on the second day of trial, the defendant's lawyer objected on the grounds it had been seized without a warrant (violating the Fourth Amendment). However, New Jersey criminal procedure required that such objections be made via pre-trial motions to suppress. After the judge pointed this out, it became clear that the defense attorney had made no pre-trial investigation whatsoever. The attorney had assumed (incorrectly) that the prosecution was required to explain its case against his client without being asked. He also had believed that the victim would not press charges and there would be no trial. The judge explained that the victim's wishes no longer mattered once an indictment had been returned.

The defense attorney did put on a case, which included aggressively cross-examining the prosecution witnesses, and calling some of Morrison's friends as witnesses to establish a different version of events. Still, Morrison was convicted, and was sentenced to eight to ten years. He was also convicted on other counts, but the Appellate Court would later decide that they were redundant with the rape charge, and would merge the sentences.

=== Appeals ===
After his trial, Morrison replaced his attorney and appealed to the Appellate Division of the New Jersey Superior Court. Other than arguing that the separate charges should be merged (something the Appellate Division would grant), he made two arguments related to the contested evidence: 1) that his previous lawyer's failure to make an objection at the proper time was ineffective assistance of counsel, violating the Sixth Amendment, and 2) that the trial court had erred by not hearing his lawyer's objection (about the bedsheet and related testimony) during the trial, violating the Fourth Amendment. In a 1981 ruling, the Appellate division rejected both claims. To the first argument, it said that Morrison had failed to establish his lawyer's failures were significant enough to undermine the fairness of the trial. The second argument, it said, was "clearly without merit." Morrison appealed to the New Jersey Supreme Court on both issues, but it declined to hear his case.

In 1982, Morrison made a petition for postconviction relief to the Law Division of the New Jersey Superior Court. However, because his claims were the same ones that had been raised on direct appeal, his petition was denied.

=== Habeas corpus petition ===
==== District court ====
In 1983, Morrison filed a habeas corpus petition in federal court, again arguing that his lawyer had provided ineffective assistance of counsel, and that the use of the bedsheet as evidence violated the Fourth Amendment. During oral argument, counsel for the state "admitted that on the record before the Court there was no apparent justification for the search and seizure." However, the district court observed that the 1976 Supreme Court case Stone v. Powell banned federal courts from considering claims that "evidence obtained in an unconstitutional search or seizure was introduced at trial" in habeas corpus petitions, as long as state courts had already allowed full litigation of the issue.

On the other hand, the claim of ineffective assistance of counsel was still viable. The district court relied on Third Circuit precedent (namely U.S. v. Baynes, Moore v. U.S., and U.S. v. Swinehart) which measured effective assistance by "the customary skill and knowledge which normally prevails at the time and place," and also required plaintiffs to show they were "prejudiced", i.e. that it was not "harmless error beyond a reasonable doubt." Calling the attorney's mistakes "unmitigated negligence," and stating that "[t]he evidence in this case was not overwhelming," the district court ruled in Morrison's favor, granting a writ of habeas corpus (i.e. the state would have to release Morrison or hold a new trial).

==== Third Circuit Court of Appeals ====
The state appealed. Just a few months after the district court made its ruling (February 1984), the U.S. Supreme Court issued its decision in Strickland v. Washington (May 1984), in which it reconciled competing standards for "ineffective assistance of counsel" that various federal circuits had established. This meant the Third Circuit Court of Appeals had to decide whether Morrison's Sixth Amendment claim held up under the new standard. In addition, the state of New Jersey argued that not only did Stone v. Powell block Morrison's Fourth Amendment claim (as the district court had held), but it should also block the Sixth Amendment claim, insofar as the defense attorney's error involved a Fourth Amendment issue.

Regarding Stone v. Powell, the Court noted that other Circuits had come to different conclusions about how it applied to ineffective assistance of counsel claims. The Second Circuit had blocked a Sixth Amendment claim, but the Fourth Circuit had gone the other way, and district courts in other circuits similarly had differing opinions. Deciding not to apply Stone v. Powell to block Morrison's Sixth Amendment claim, the Court said:

We are persuaded that absent a clear mandate from the Supreme Court, Stone v. Powell should not be extended to bar consideration of Sixth Amendment issues based on counsel's alleged failure to advance Fourth Amendment claims ... Most significantly for our purposes here, in response to the dissent's [in Stone v. Powell] alarmed characterization of the decision as the prelude to a "drastic withdrawal of federal habeas jurisdiction," Justice Powell emphasized the limited nature of the decision. . .

— Morrison v. Kimmelman, 752 F. 2d at 920 (Judge Joseph S. Lord III, writing for the court)

To review the Sixth Amendment claim itself, the new standard from Strickland v. Washington had two requirements: a lawyer's work would be deemed "ineffective" if 1) "counsel's representation fell below an objective standard of reasonableness," and 2) "but for counsel's unprofessional errors, the result of the proceeding would have been different." The Court spent only two sentences determining that the first requirement was met. The second requirement, however, was a "mixed question of law and fact," and it was the point where the relevant legal standard had been changed the most by Strickland. Rather than review the question themselves, the Court chose to remand it to the district court. After all, the district court's ruling was only invalid because the law had changed.

The state petitioned for certiorari to the U.S. Supreme Court, which was granted.

== Decision of the Supreme Court ==
=== Majority opinion ===
The Supreme Court voted 9–0 to affirm the decision of the Third Circuit; the only differences of opinion were about how to apply Stone v. Powell to future cases. The majority opinion was written by Justice Brennan and joined by five others. Brennan wrote that Fourth Amendment issues around evidence from illegal searches and seizures—which were the subject of Stone v. Powell—were fundamentally distinct from Sixth Amendment ineffective assistance of counsel issues. This meant they had to be treated differently, even when they intersected, and it would be unjust to extend Stone to Sixth Amendment litigation.

==== Fourth Amendment versus Sixth Amendment issues ====
First, there were two distinct constitutional issues at work:

Although it is frequently invoked in criminal trials, the Fourth Amendment is not a trial right; the protection it affords against governmental intrusion into one's home and affairs pertains to all citizens. . . In order to prevail, the complainant need prove only that the search or seizure was illegal and that it violated his reasonable expectation of privacy in the item or place at issue. . .The right to counsel is a fundamental right of criminal defendants; it assures the fairness, and thus the legitimacy, of our adversary process. The essence of an ineffective-assistance claim is that counsel's unprofessional errors so upset the adversarial balance between defense and prosecution that the trial was rendered unfair and the verdict rendered suspect. See, e. g., Strickland v. Washington. . .Thus, while respondent's defaulted Fourth Amendment claim is one element of proof of his Sixth Amendment claim, the two claims have separate identities and reflect different constitutional values.

— Kimmelman v. Morrison, 477 U.S. at 374 (Justice Brennan, writing for the majority)

Second, the reasoning behind Stone v. Powell could not be extended to ineffective-assistance claims. Stone had given state governments a break from re-litigation of the exclusionary rule (which prevented illegally-seized evidence from being used in court), in the context of habeas corpus petitions in federal court, as long as the issue(s) had been properly litigated already in state courts. The exclusionary rule was not itself a constitutional rule, but a judge-made rule that served to protect Fourth Amendment rights. That meant courts were free to reign in the exclusionary rule if it became too much of a burden. There were other exceptions to the exclusionary rule, such as grand jury hearings, and impeaching defendants who chose to testify on their own behalf.

In contrast, the right to assistance of counsel was an explicit constitutional right, and perhaps the most important right during a trial:

The right of an accused to counsel is beyond question a fundamental right. Without counsel the right to a fair trial itself would be of little consequence, for it is through counsel that the accused secures his other rights.

— Kimmelman v. Morrison, 477 U.S. at 377 (Justice Brennan, writing for the majority) (citations omitted)

That meant that courts did not have freedom to curtail habeas corpus review of claims of ineffective assistance of counsel. Not only was the right a foundation of a fair trial, but most non-lawyers would not recognize that their lawyer had made errors, or grasp the severity of the errors, until they had a chance to talk to a different attorney about it. A defendant who retained their trial lawyer through all of their normal appeals therefore might be unaware of a viable ineffective-assistance claim until after those appeals, and then habeas corpus would be the only opportunity left.

Third, the majority did not buy the state's argument that allowing ineffective-assistance claims where the underlying error was a failure to press a Fourth Amendment issue would let prisoners circumvent Stone. The newly announced Strickland standard, like the standard the Third Circuit had previously used for ineffective assistance, had two requirements: 1) incompetent lawyering, and 2) prejudicial effect. Underlying Fourth Amendment issues were, at most, only relevant to the first, and only partially at that. Prisoners would also have to prove that their lawyer handled the viable Fourth Amendment incompetently at trial, and that the error was prejudicial under the "highly demanding" Strickland standard.

==== Applying Strickland ====
The majority opinion then turned to determining whether the requirements of Strickland were met. As to competence, the Court acknowledged that Strickland imposed a presumption in favor of attorney competence, and therefore the burden was on Morrison to establish his attorney's incompetence. Even so, the Court felt this burden was met:

Viewing counsel's failure to conduct any discovery from his perspective at the time he decided to forgo that stage of pretrial preparation and applying a "heavy measure of deference," to his judgment, we find counsel's decision unreasonable, that is, contrary to prevailing professional norms. The justifications Morrison's attorney offered for his omission betray a startling ignorance of the law — or a weak attempt to shift blame for inadequate preparation.

— Kimmelman v. Morrison, 477 U.S. at 385 (Justice Brennan, writing for the majority)

With regard to the prejudicial effect requirement, the state tried to argue that the case should not be remanded for a new hearing, because the prosecution's other evidence had clearly been strong enough to convict even if the bedsheet had been excluded. The state relied on comments the trial judge had made during a post-conviction hearing for bail pending appeal, to the effect that the other evidence and witnesses had been more important than the bedsheet, and "[t]he sheet was just one small phase in this whole case." The state characterized this as "a finding of historical fact," which should presumed to be correct under the habeas corpus statute (28 U.S.C. § 2254(d)).

The Court did not find this convincing. First, it was a bail hearing, and the judge was not attempting to make factual findings. Rather, the task was to assess the reasonableness of Morrison's grounds for appeal. Furthermore, the judge's comments did not say enough to resolve the second prong of the Strickland test, so "[n]ot only was the judge not asked to answer the question presently before the federal courts, he did not answer it."

Morrison also disagreed with the decision of the Third Circuit to remand, arguing instead that the trial record was enough to show prejudice. The Court disagreed, noting 1) that there had never been an evidentiary hearing on the legality of the search and seizure, and the state had not conceded the issue, and 2) that the state still argued that the other evidence presented at trial had been enough to convict. The Court thus affirmed the Third Circuit's decision.

=== Powell's concurrence ===
Justice Powell, joined by Chief Justice Burger and Justice Rehnquist, agreed with the outcome the majority reached; Stone did not block Morrison's habeas corpus petition, and the case would be remanded to resolve the question of prejudicial effect. However, he writes,

The more difficult question is whether the admission of illegally seized but reliable evidence can ever constitute "prejudice" under Strickland. There is a strong argument that it cannot. But that argument has neither been raised by the parties nor discussed by the various courts involved in this case. Consequently, the proper course is to reject petitioners' Stone v. Powell argument and go no further. Though the Court appears to take this course, it employs unnecessarily broad language that may suggest that we have considered and resolved the broader Strickland issue in this case.

— Kimmelman v. Morrison, 477 U.S. at 391 (Justice Powell, concurring)

Powell was concerned with an issue that had not been raised by the state, nor addressed by any party or court in the case so far: although illegal searches and seizures were a serious violation of the constitution, evidence obtained that way was usually reliable. The point of the right to the assistance of counsel under the Sixth Amendment was to safeguard the fairness of trials in and adversarial system, but if anything, excluding reliable evidence from a trial would tend to make it less fair. Given that this question was not properly presented to the court, Powell did not think it appropriate to make a ruling on the matter, but he felt the majority had glossed over the issue.

== Subsequent and related litigation ==
=== Remand ===
On remand, the district court found that the prejudice requirement of Strickland was satisfied. The state did concede that the bedsheet was seized illegally, but it tried to argue, relying on the language of Powell's concurrence, that violations of the exclusionary rule could never be prejudicial under Strickland, but the court said the argument was "specifically rejected" by the majority. The state also made a motion to allow the trial judge to testify regarding the strength of the prosecution's case, and how he might have ruled in the absence of the bedsheet, and this was also denied, as "it is a firmly established rule in our jurisprudence that a judge may not be asked to testify about his mental processes in reaching a judicial decision." On the substance of the prejudice requirement, the Court found that the Strickland standard was fairly close to the test it had used before, and the writ of habeas corpus would be granted.

=== Morrison's other case ===
In 1980 (the year after the above rape trial), Morrison was tried and convicted for sexually abusing another 15-year-old girl. At first, he was represented by the same incompetent attorney (a man named Robert Goodman), and Goodman was again slow to realize that the state had seized evidence against his client. In this case, it was pantyhose recovered from the crime scene, a back room of Morrison's business. The state had a better argument for its legality, though, as the co-owner of the shop had possibly given permission for the search; it also turned out that cross-examination about the pantyhose undermined some of the victim's testimony. Given the mixed utility of the evidence at trial, when Morrison made an ineffective-assistance argument on a post-conviction petition, it was denied. That decision was appealed, and in 1987, the New Jersey Appellate Division applied the Strickland test, finding that Goodman was indeed incompetent, but the error had helped as much as it had hurt, so the prejudice requirement was not satisfied.
