= Thrifty Food Plan =

U.S. plan used to design food stamp benefits

The Thrifty Food Plan (TFP) is one of four USDA-designed food plans specifying categories and amounts of foods to provide adequate nutrition. The other plans are known as the Low-Cost, Moderate-Cost, and Liberal food plans. Each plan specifies a number of pounds per week for each of 58 food categories for different age groups, for men, women, and children.

The TFP serves as the basis for designing Food Stamp Program benefits. It is the least expensive food plan, calculated monthly using consumer price index (CPI) data but differs from the CPI's food components. The TFP cost represents a national average for a four-person household (adult couple and two school-age children) and is adjusted for other household sizes using a formula that reflects economies of scale. Each June, the TFP sets maximum food stamp benefits for the fiscal year starting in October.
