= Department of Treasury, Bureau of Alcohol, Tobacco & Firearms v. Galioto =

Department of Treasury, Bureau of Alcohol, Tobacco and Firearms v. Galioto
- Supreme Court of the United States

Argued March 26, 1986 Decided June 27, 1986
- Full case name: United States Department of the Treasury, Bureau of Alcohol, Tobacco and Firearms v. Galioto
- Citations: 477 U.S. 556 (more) 106 S. Ct. 2683; 91 L. Ed. 2d 459

Case history
- Prior: Appeal from the United States District Court for the District of New Jersey

Holding
- Mooted when PL 99-308 was signed into law.

Court membership
- Chief Justice Warren E. Burger Associate Justices William J. Brennan Jr. · Byron White; Thurgood Marshall · Harry Blackmun; Lewis F. Powell Jr. · William Rehnquist; John P. Stevens · Sandra Day O'Connor

Case opinion
- Majority: Burger, joined by unanimous

Department of Treasury, Bureau of Alcohol, Tobacco and Firearms v. Galioto, 477 U.S. 556 (1986), was a United States Supreme Court case.

== Background ==
Generally, convicted felons and mental patients are prohibited from purchasing firearms in the United States. A federal statute, 18 U.S.C. § 925 allowed some felons to appeal to the BATF to restore their rights to purchase firearms. At that time, prior mental patients did not have a similar route to restore their right to purchase firearms. The appellee argued that this was unreasonable and discriminatory.

Between the time that the Court agreed to hear Galioto, and the time that the case was heard, PL 99-308 was signed into law, allowing former mental patients to appeal to restore their rights to purchase firearms, rendering the case moot.
