= List of United States Supreme Court cases, volume 477 =

This is a list of all United States Supreme Court cases from volume 477 of the United States Reports:

Case name	Citation	Date decided
Wardair Canada Inc. v. Fla. Dept. of Revenue	477 U.S. 1	1986
Schiavone v. Fortune	477 U.S. 21	1986
Bowen v. Pub. Agencies Opposed to Social Security Entrapment	477 U.S. 41	1986
Meritor Savings Bank, FSB v. Vinson	477 U.S. 57	1986
McMillan v. Pennsylvania	477 U.S. 79	1986
Mandatory minimum sentencing enhancements are not elements of crimes subject to the requirement that they be proved beyond a reasonable doubt.
United States v. Am. Bar Endowment	477 U.S. 105	1986
Maine v. Taylor	477 U.S. 131	1986
Atkins v. Rivera	477 U.S. 154	1986
Darden v. Wainwright	477 U.S. 168	1986
Offshore Logistics, Inc. v. Tallentire	477 U.S. 207	1986
Anderson v. Liberty Lobby, Inc.	477 U.S. 242	1986
Automobile Workers v. Brock	477 U.S. 274	1986
Memphis Community Sch. Dist. v. Stachura	477 U.S. 299	1986
Celotex Corp. v. Catrett	477 U.S. 317	1986
MacDonald, Sommer & Frates v. Yolo Cnty.	477 U.S. 340	1986
Kimmelman v. Morrison	477 U.S. 365	1986
Ford v. Wainwright	477 U.S. 399	1986
Kuhlmann v. Wilson	477 U.S. 436	1986
Murray v. Carrier	477 U.S. 478	1986
Smith v. Murray	477 U.S. 527	1986
Dept. of Treasury v. Galioto	477 U.S. 556	1986
Riverside v. Rivera	477 U.S. 561	1986
Dept. of Transp. v. Paralyzed Veterans of America	477 U.S. 597	1986
Ohio Civil Rights Comm'n v. Dayton Christian Schools, Inc.	477 U.S. 619	1986
Lyng v. Castillo	477 U.S. 635	1986
New Mexico v. Earnest	477 U.S. 648	1986
