= Supplemental Nutrition Assistance Program =

United States government food assistance program

United States Department of Agriculture

Program overview
- Formed: 1939; 87 years ago
- Jurisdiction: Federal government of the United States
- Website: www.fns.usda.gov/snap

The Supplemental Nutrition Assistance Program (SNAP), formerly and colloquially still known as the Food Stamp Program, or simply food stamps, is a United States federal government program that provides food-purchasing assistance for low- and no-income persons to help them maintain adequate nutrition and health. It is a federal aid program administered by the U.S. Department of Agriculture (USDA) under the Food and Nutrition Administration (FNA), though benefits are distributed by specific departments of U.S. states (e.g., the Division of Social Services, the Department of Health and Human Services, etc.).

In fiscal year 2025, SNAP served an average of about 42.4 million people per month. Benefits totaled about $95.8 billion and were included in approximately $102.6 billion in total program costs. In 2017, approximately 9.2% of American households obtained SNAP benefits at some point, with approximately 16.7% of all children living in households with SNAP benefits. Beneficiaries and costs increased sharply with the Great Recession, peaked in 2013 and declined to 2017 as the economy recovered. It is the largest nutrition program of the 15 administered by FNS and is a key component of the social safety net for low-income Americans. SNAP fraud is rare.

SNAP recipients by County

The amount of SNAP benefits received by a household depends on the household's size, income, and expenses. For most of its history, the program used paper-denominated "stamps" or coupons—worth $1 (brown), $5 (blue), and $10 (green)—bound into booklets of various denominations, to be torn out individually and used in single-use exchange. Because of their 1:1 value ratio with actual currency, the coupons were printed by the Bureau of Engraving and Printing. Their rectangular shape resembled a U.S. dollar bill (although about one-half the size), including intaglio printing on high-quality paper with watermarks.

In the late 1990s, the Food Stamp Program was revamped, with some states phasing out paper stamps in favor of a specialized debit card system known as electronic benefit transfer (EBT), provided by private contractors. EBT has been implemented in all states since June 2004. Each month, SNAP benefits are directly deposited into the household's EBT card account. Households may use EBT to pay for food at supermarkets, convenience stores, and other food retailers, including certain farmers' markets.

== History ==
=== Origin of food stamps ===
The federal government's attempt to address hunger through the means of food stamps was first introduced in the 1930s after becoming possible when the U.S. Congress passed the income tax law in 1913. After the Federal government had the funding to create a social safety net, its involvement in food assistance was introduced in the 1930s, when the Great Depression caused unemployment, homelessness, and starvation to become a national issue that permeated such a high percentage of the population.

At the time of the Great Depression, farmers were growing surplus produce, but unemployed and impoverished people were unable to afford to buy it. The origin of food stamps was intended partially to help the poor, but just as equally to boost the economy and pay farmers a fair price for their labor. In essence, food stamps were intended to create a political agreement between agriculture and the federal government by giving out excess goods in a crisis.

=== First food stamp program (FSP; May 16, 1939 – spring 1943) ===
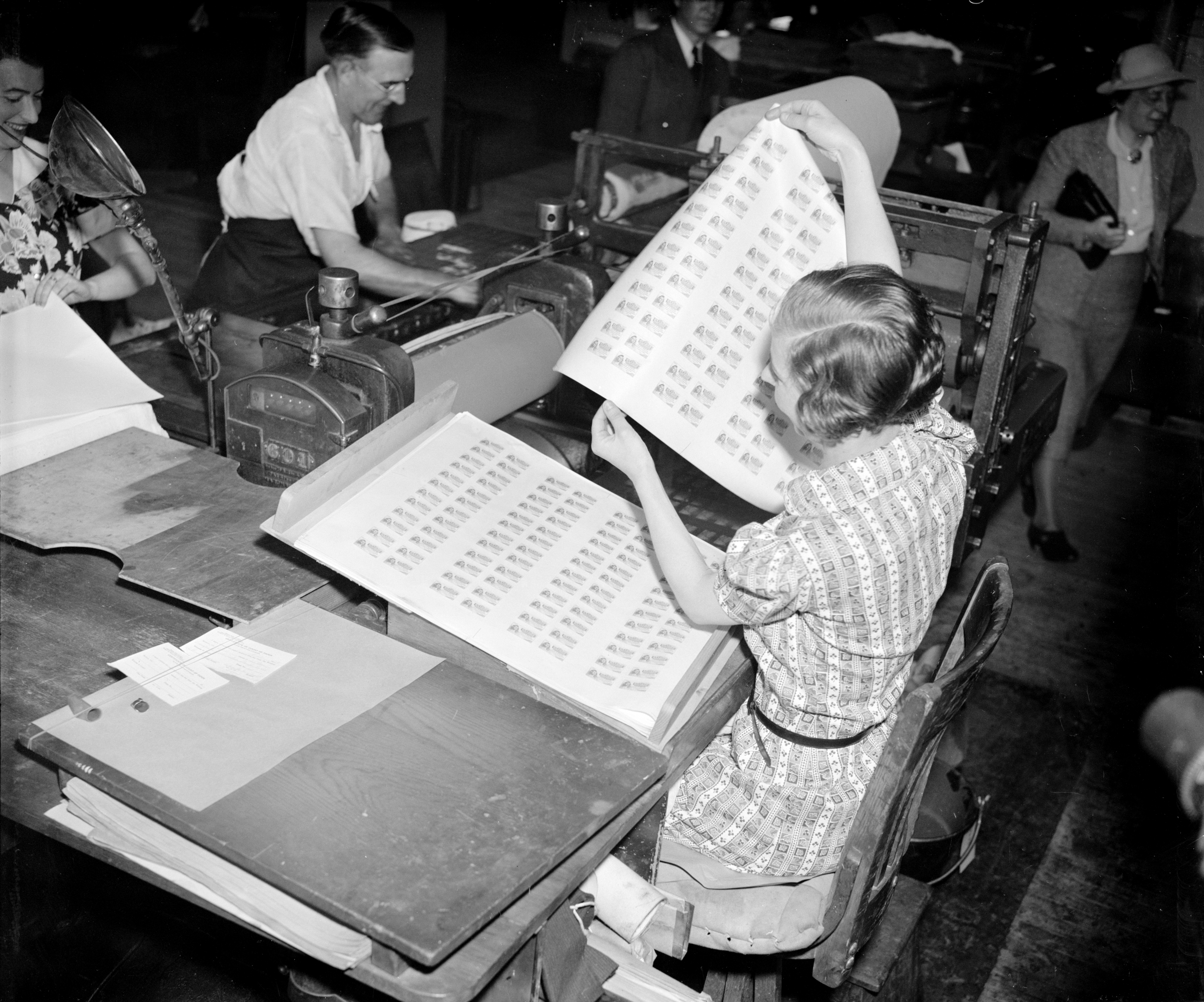
An effort to manage agricultural surpluses, the first food stamps came off the presses April 20, 1939.

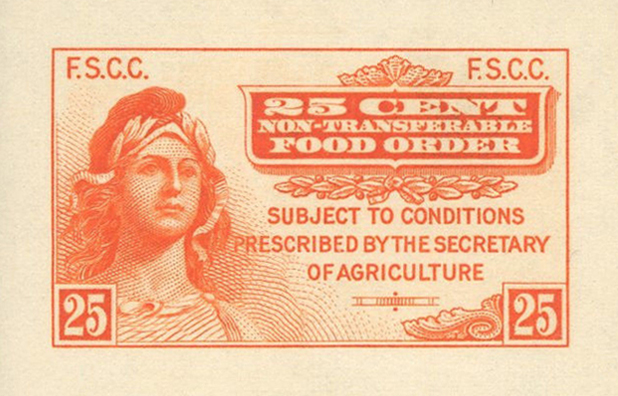
Orange stamps were good for any grocery item the purchaser chose, except drugs, liquor, and items consumed on the premises.

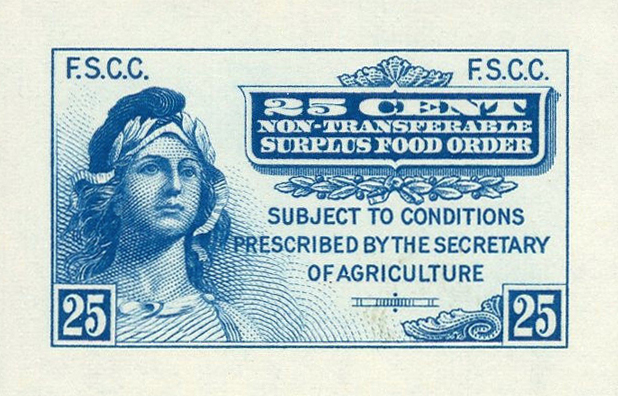
Blue stamps bought only surplus foods—dairy products, eggs, citrus fruits, prunes, and fresh vegetables.

The idea for the first food stamp program has been credited to various people, most notably Secretary of Agriculture Henry A. Wallace and the program's first administrator, Milo Perkins. Of the program, Perkins said, "We got a picture of a gorge, with farm surpluses on one cliff and under-nourished city folks with outstretched hands on the other. We set out to find a practical way to build a bridge across that chasm." The program, run by the U.S. Department of Agriculture (USDA), permitted people on relief to buy orange stamps equal to their normal food expenditures.

For every dollar of orange stamps purchased, another fifty cents worth of blue stamps were received. Orange food stamps could be used at any food retailers or wholesalers, but excluded alcoholic beverages, concession stand meals that could be eaten on premises, and tobacco products. The blue stamps could only be used to buy what the USDA defined as surplus produce, which included items such as beans, eggs, fruit, and the like.

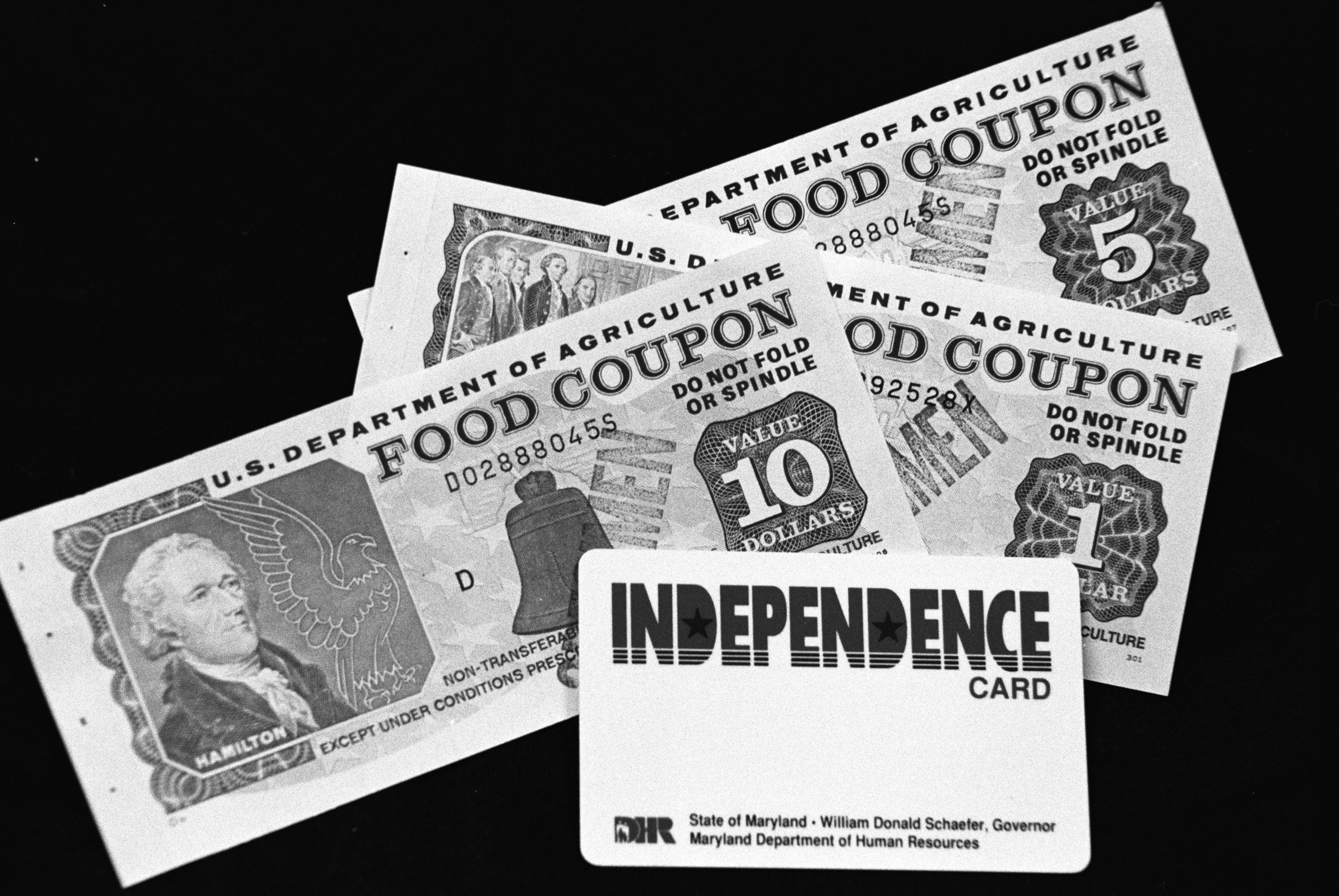
Food stamps and the new EBT card

During the course of nearly four years, the first FSP reached approximately 20 million people, in nearly half of the counties in the United States at a cost of $262 million. At its peak, the program was actively assisting an estimated four million people. The first recipient was Mabel McFiggin of Rochester, New York; the first retailer to redeem the stamps was Joseph Mutolo; and the first retailer caught violating program rules was Nick Salzano in October 1939. The program ended when the conditions that brought the program into being—unmarketable food surpluses and widespread unemployment—ceased to exist. By 1943, the start of World War II had equalized the agricultural economy and the unemployment rate, and diminished the US government incentive to continue the program for those still in need.

=== Pilot food stamp program (1961–1964) ===
The 18 years between the end of the first FSP and the inception of the next were filled with studies, reports, and legislative proposals. Prominent US senators actively associated with attempts to enact a food stamp program during this period included George Aiken, Robert M. La Follette Jr., Hubert Humphrey, Estes Kefauver, and Stuart Symington. From 1954 on, US Representative Leonor Sullivan strove to pass food-stamp program legislation.

Hunger continued for the poor people of the country even after the Great Depression ended, but advocacy to reinstate the food stamp program was generally unsuccessful while the political agenda did not require it. Until 1961 when President John F. Kennedy took office, there were few pilot programs in place to help America's poor.

On September 21, 1959, P.L. 86-341 authorized the Secretary of Agriculture to operate a food-stamp system to January 31, 1962. The Eisenhower Administration never used the authority. However, in fulfillment of a campaign promise made in West Virginia, President John F. Kennedy's first Executive Order called for expanded food distribution and, on February 2, 1961, he announced that food stamp pilot programs would be initiated. The pilot programs would retain the requirement that the food stamps be purchased, but eliminated the concept of special stamps for surplus foods. A Department spokesman indicated the emphasis would be on increasing the consumption of perishables. This decision still provided great advantages for retailers, and the political choice to eliminate the required purchase of surplus produce created financial gains for the producers and distributors of processed foods.

This move, however, was heavily resisted by representatives of the Civil Rights Movement. Black sharecroppers, already pushed out of agricultural work due to mechanization, lost their source of income to purchase food stamps. While White-based grocers grew profits as a result of food stamps, plantation owners utilized food stamps as leverage against former Black sharecroppers. This leverage looked like taking food stamp costs out of a sharecropper's income, permitting food stamps for only select grocers, permitting stamps for only the most expensive products, and similar maneuvers. These mechanisms consolidated White power over sharecroppers, and the move to food stamps was criticized by many Black activists.

Of the program, US Representative Leonor K. Sullivan of Missouri asserted, "...the Department of Agriculture seemed bent on outlining a possible food stamp plan of such scope and magnitude, involving some 25 million persons, as to make the whole idea seem ridiculous and tear food stamp plans to smithereens."

=== Food Stamp Act of 1964 ===
President Johnson called for a permanent food-stamp program on January 31, 1964, as part of his War on Poverty platform introduced at the State of the Union a few weeks earlier. Agriculture Secretary Orville Freeman submitted the legislation on April 17, 1964. The bill eventually passed by Congress was H.R. 10222, introduced by Congresswoman Sullivan. One of the members on the House Committee on Agriculture who voted against the FSP in Committee was then Representative Bob Dole, of Kansas. Later, as a senator, after he worked on the 1977 legislation that addressed problems with the program, Dole became a staunch supporter of it.

The Food Stamp Act of 1964 was intended to strengthen the agricultural economy and provide improved levels of nutrition among low-income households; however, the practical purpose was to bring the pilot FSP under congressional control and to enact the regulations into law.

The major provisions were:

- The State Plan of Operation requirement and development of eligibility standards by States;
- They required that the recipients should purchase their food stamps, while paying the average money spent on food then receiving an amount of food stamps representing an opportunity more nearly to obtain a low-cost nutritionally adequate diet;
- The eligibility for purchase with food stamps of all items intended for human consumption except alcoholic beverages and imported foods (the House version would have prohibited the purchase of soft drinks, luxury foods, and luxury frozen foods);
- Prohibitions against discrimination on basis of race, religious creed, national origin, or political beliefs;
- The division of responsibilities between States (certification and issuance) and the Federal Government (funding of benefits and authorization of retailers and wholesalers), with shared responsibility for funding costs of administration; and
- Appropriations for the first year limited to $75 million; for the second year, to $100 million; and, for the third year, to $200 million.

The Agriculture Department estimated that participation in a national FSP would eventually reach 4 million, at a cost of $360 million annually, far below the actual numbers.

The original implementation of food stamps was intended to help working farmers earn fair wages. The passing of the Food Stamp Act of 1964 that eliminated the surplus produce clause for blue stamps helped to boost the market for processed food retailers. After 1964, when the program grew more expensive and economic effects of the Depression and world wars were forgotten, Congress introduced more intense eligibility standards for the program in an attempt to mitigate costs that went towards helping those in need. Through the 1970s and 1980s many communities made claims that federal safety net and private charities were failing to meet the needs of poor individuals who needed greater resources and access to food.

=== Program expansion: participation milestones in the 1960s and early 1970s ===
In April 1965, participation topped half a million. (Actual participation was 561,261 people.) Participation topped 1 million in March 1966, 2 million in October 1967, 3 million in February 1969, 4 million in February 1970, 5 million one month later in March 1970, 6 million two months later in May 1970, 10 million in February 1971, and 15 million in October 1974. Rapid increases in participation during this period were primarily due to geographic expansion.

=== Major legislative changes (early 1970s) ===
The early 1970s were a period of growth in participation, concern about the cost of providing food stamp benefits, and questions about administration, primarily timely certification. During this time, the issue was framed that would dominate food stamp legislation ever after: how to balance program access with program accountability. Three major pieces of legislation shaped this period, leading up to massive reform to follow:

P.L. 91-671 (January 11, 1971) established uniform national standards of eligibility and work requirements; required that allotments be equivalent to the cost of a nutritionally adequate diet; limited households' purchase requirements to 30 percent of their income; instituted an outreach requirement; authorized the Agriculture Department to pay 62.5 percent of specific administrative costs incurred by States; expanded the FSP to Guam, Puerto Rico, and the Virgin Islands of the United States; and provided $1.75 billion appropriations for Fiscal Year 1971.

Agriculture and Consumer Protection Act of 1973 (P.L. 93–86, August 10, 1973) required States to expand the program to every political jurisdiction before July 1, 1974; expanded the program to drug addicts and alcoholics in treatment and rehabilitation centers; established semi-annual allotment adjustments, bi-monthly issuance, and Supplemental Security Income (SSI) "cash-out" (which gave the option to states to issue Food Stamp benefits to SSI recipients in the form of their estimated cash value consolidated within the SSI grant, in order to reduce administrative costs); introduced statutory complexity in the income definition (by including in-kind payments and providing an accompanying exception); and required the department to establish temporary eligibility standards for disasters.

P.L. 93-347 (July 12, 1974) authorized the department to pay 50 percent of all states' costs for administering the program and established the requirement for efficient and effective administration by the States.

=== 1974 nationwide program ===
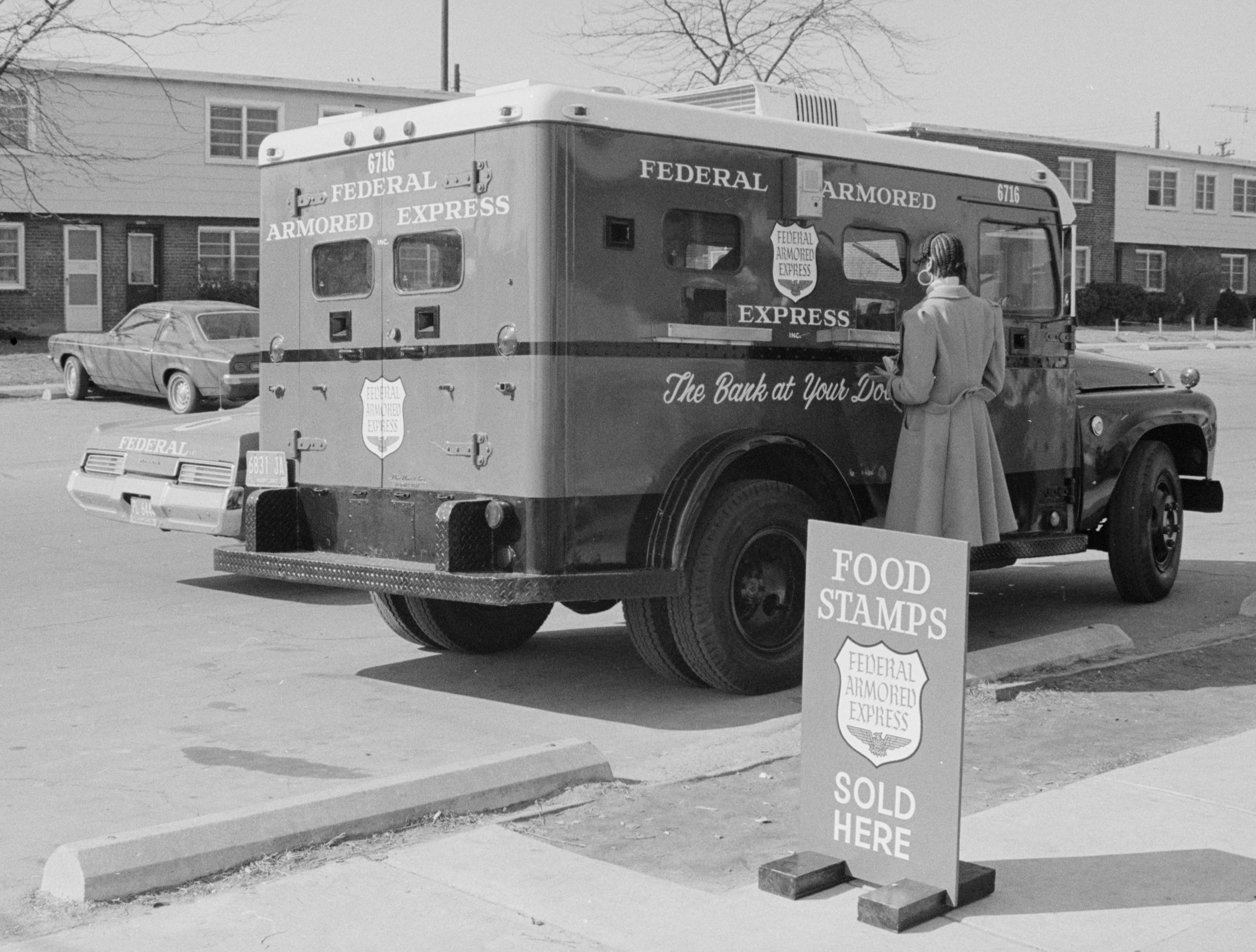
An armored car in Baltimore, Maryland repurposed to sell food stamps in 1975

In accordance with P.L. 93–86, the FSP began operating nationwide on July 1, 1974. (The program was not fully implemented in Puerto Rico until November 1, 1974.) Participation for July 1974 was almost 14 million.

=== Eligible access to Supplemental Security Income beneficiaries ===
Once a person is a beneficiary of the Supplemental Security Income (SSI) Program they may be automatically eligible for Food Stamps depending on their state's laws. How much money in food stamps they receive also varies by state. Supplemental Security Income was created in 1974.

=== Food Stamp Act of 1977 ===
Both the outgoing Republican administration and the new Democratic administration offered Congress proposed legislation to reform the FSP in 1977. The Republican bill stressed targeting benefits to the neediest, simplifying administration, and tightening controls on the program; the Democratic bill focused on increasing access to those most in need and simplifying and streamlining a complicated and cumbersome process that delayed benefit delivery as well as reducing errors, and curbing abuse. The chief force for the Democratic administration was Robert Greenstein, Administrator of the Food and Nutrition Service (FNS).

In Congress, major players were Senators George McGovern, Jacob Javits, Hubert Humphrey, and Bob Dole, and Congressmen Foley and Richmond. Amid all the themes, the one that became the rallying cry for FSP reform was "EPR"—eliminate the purchase requirement—because of the barrier to participation the purchase requirement represented. The bill that became the law (S. 275) did eliminate the purchase requirement. It also:

- eliminated categorical eligibility;
- established statutory income eligibility guidelines at the poverty line;
- established 10 categories of excluded income;
- reduced the number of deductions used to calculate net income and established a standard deduction to take the place of eliminated deductions;
- raised the general resource limit to $1,750;
- established the fair market value (FMV) test for evaluating vehicles as resources;
- penalized households whose heads voluntarily quit jobs;
- restricted eligibility for students and aliens;
- eliminated the requirement that households must have cooking facilities;
- replaced store due bills with cash change up to 99 cents;
- established the principle that stores must sell a substantial amount of staple foods if they are to be authorized;
- established the ground rules for Indian Tribal Organization administration of the FSP on reservations; and
- introduced demonstration project authority.

In addition to EPR, the Food Stamp Act of 1977 included several access provisions:

- using mail, telephone, or home visits for certification;
- requirements for outreach, bilingual personnel and materials, and nutrition education materials;
- recipients' right to submit applications the first day they attempt to do so;
- 30-day processing standard and inception of the concept of expedited service;
- Aid to Families with Dependent Children (AFDC), the major cash welfare program; also assist SSI clients
- notice, recertification, and retroactive benefit protections; and
- a requirement for States to develop a disaster plan.

The integrity provisions of the new program included fraud disqualifications, enhanced federal funding for states' anti-fraud activities, and financial incentives for low error rates.

Senator Dole, Republican of Kansas, who had worked with Senator McGovern, Democrat of South Dakota, to produce a bipartisan solution to two of the main problems associated with food stamps—cumbersome purchase requirements and lax eligibility standards—told Congress regarding the new provisions: "I am confident that this bill eliminates the greedy and feeds the needy."

The House Report for the 1977 legislation points out that the changes in the Food Stamp Program are needed without reference to upcoming welfare reform since "the path to welfare reform is, indeed, rocky...."

EPR was implemented January 1, 1979. Participation that month increased 1.5 million over the preceding month. Increased participation was due to both eliminating the purchase requirement and the 1980 recession.

According to Maggie Dickinson in the book Feeding the Crisis of Care and Abandonment in America's Food Safety Net "The Food Stamp Act of 1977 finally eliminated the food stamp purchase requirement, which mean poor families no longer needed to have cash up front to purchase food stamps."

An advertisement for food stamps in the 1970s, to help fight hunger in America. The programs in the late 1970s were very effective in fighting hunger in America.

=== Cutbacks of the early 1980s ===
The large and expensive FSP proved to be a favorite subject of close scrutiny from both the Executive Branch and Congress in the early 1980s. Major legislation in 1981 and 1982 enacted cutbacks including:

- addition of a gross income eligibility test in addition to the net income test for most households;
- temporary freeze on adjustments of the shelter deduction cap and the standard deduction and constraints on future adjustments;
- annual adjustments in food stamp allotments rather than semi-annual;
- consideration of non-elderly parents who live with their children and non-elderly siblings who live together as one household;
- required periodic reporting and retrospective budgeting;
- prohibition against using Federal funds for outreach;
- replacing the FSP in Puerto Rico with a block grant for nutrition assistance;
- counting retirement accounts as resources;
- state option to require job search of applicants as well as participants; and
- increased disqualification periods for voluntary quitters.

The first electronic benefits transfer (EBT) card pilot program began in Reading, Pennsylvania, in 1984.

=== Mid-to-late 1980s ===
Recognition of the severe domestic hunger problem in the latter half of the 1980s led to incremental expansions of the FSP in 1985 and 1987, such as elimination of sales tax on food stamp purchases, reinstitution of categorical eligibility, increased resource limit for most households ($2,000), eligibility for the homeless, and expanded nutrition education. The Hunger Prevention Act of 1988 and the Mickey Leland Memorial Domestic Hunger Relief Act in 1990 foretold the improvements that would be coming. The 1988 and 1990 legislation accomplished the following:

- increasing benefits by applying a multiplication factor to Thrifty Food Plan costs;
- making outreach an optional activity for States;
- excluding advance earned income tax credits as income;
- simplifying procedures for calculating medical deductions;
- instituting periodic adjustments of the minimum benefit;
- authorizing nutrition education grants;
- establishing severe penalties for violations by individuals or participating firms; and
- establishing EBT as an issuance alternative.

Throughout this era, significant players were principally various committee chairmen: Congressmen Leland, Hall, Foley, Leon Panetta, and, de la Garza and Senator Patrick Leahy.

=== 1993 Mickey Leland Childhood Hunger Relief Act ===
By 1993, major changes in food stamp benefits had arrived. The final legislation provided for $2.8 billion in benefit increases over Fiscal Years 1984–1988. Leon Panetta, in his new role as OMB Director, played a major role as did Senator Leahy. Substantive changes included:

- eliminating the shelter deduction cap beginning January 1, 1997;
- providing a deduction for legally binding child support payments made to nonhousehold members;
- raising the cap on the dependent care deduction from $160 to $200 for children under 2 years old and $175 for all other dependents;
- improving employment and training (E&T) dependent care reimbursements;
- increasing the FMV test for vehicles to $4,550 on September 1, 1994, and $4,600 on October 1, 1995, then annually adjusting the value from $5,000 on October 1, 1996;
- mandating asset accumulation demonstration projects; and
- simplifying the household definition.

=== Later participation milestones ===
In December 1979, participation surpassed 20 million. In March 1994, participation hit a new high of 28 million.

=== 1996 welfare reform ===
By 1994, FSP's program enrollment seemed to see growth once more, with an enrollment of 27 million people. By 1996, the Responsibility and Work Opportunity Reconciliation Act restricted eligibility even further, reinforced even stronger working requirements, restricted given benefits, and increased penalties for non-compliance.

The mid-1990s was a period of welfare reform. Prior to 1996, the rules for the cash welfare program, Aid to Families with Dependent Children (AFDC), were waived for many states. With the enactment of the 1996 welfare reform act, called the Personal Responsibility and Work Opportunity Reconciliation Act of 1996 (PRWORA), AFDC, an entitlement program, was replaced with a new block grant to states called Temporary Assistance to Needy Families (TANF).

Although the Food Stamp Program was reauthorized in the 1996 Farm Bill, the 1996 welfare reform made several changes to the program, including:

- denying eligibility for food stamps to most legal immigrants who had been in the country less than five years;
- placing a time limit on food stamp receipt of three out of 36 months for Able-bodied Adults Without Dependents (ABAWDs) who are not working at least 20 hours a week or participating in a work program;
- reducing the maximum allotments to 100 percent of the change in the Thrifty Food Plan (TFP) from 103 percent of the change in the TFP;
- freezing the standard deduction, the vehicle limit, and the minimum benefit;
- setting the shelter cap at graduated specified levels up to $300 by fiscal year 2001, and allowing states to mandate the use of the standard utility allowance;
- revising provisions for disqualification, including comparable disqualification with other means-tested programs; and
- requiring states to implement EBT before October 1, 2002.

As a result of all these changes, participation rates plummeted in the late 1990s, according to the online magazine Slate.

The Balanced Budget Act of 1997 (BBA) and the Agricultural Research, Education and Extension Act of 1998 (AREERA) made some changes to these provisions, most significantly:

- using additional Employment and Training (E&T) funds to providing work program opportunities for able-bodied adults without dependents;
- allowing states to exempt up to 15 percent of able-bodied adults without dependents who would otherwise be ineligible;
- restoring eligibility for certain elderly, disabled, and minor immigrants who resided in the United States when the 1996 welfare reform act was enacted; and
- cutting administrative funding for states to account for certain administrative costs that previously had been allocated to the AFDC program and now were required to be allocated to the Food Stamp Program.

The fiscal year 2001 agriculture appropriations bill included two significant changes. The legislation increased the excess shelter cap to $340 in fiscal year 2001 and then indexed the cap to changes in the Consumer Price Index for All Consumers each year beginning in fiscal year 2002. The legislation also allowed states to use the vehicle limit they use in a TANF assistance program, if it would result in a lower attribution of resources for the household.

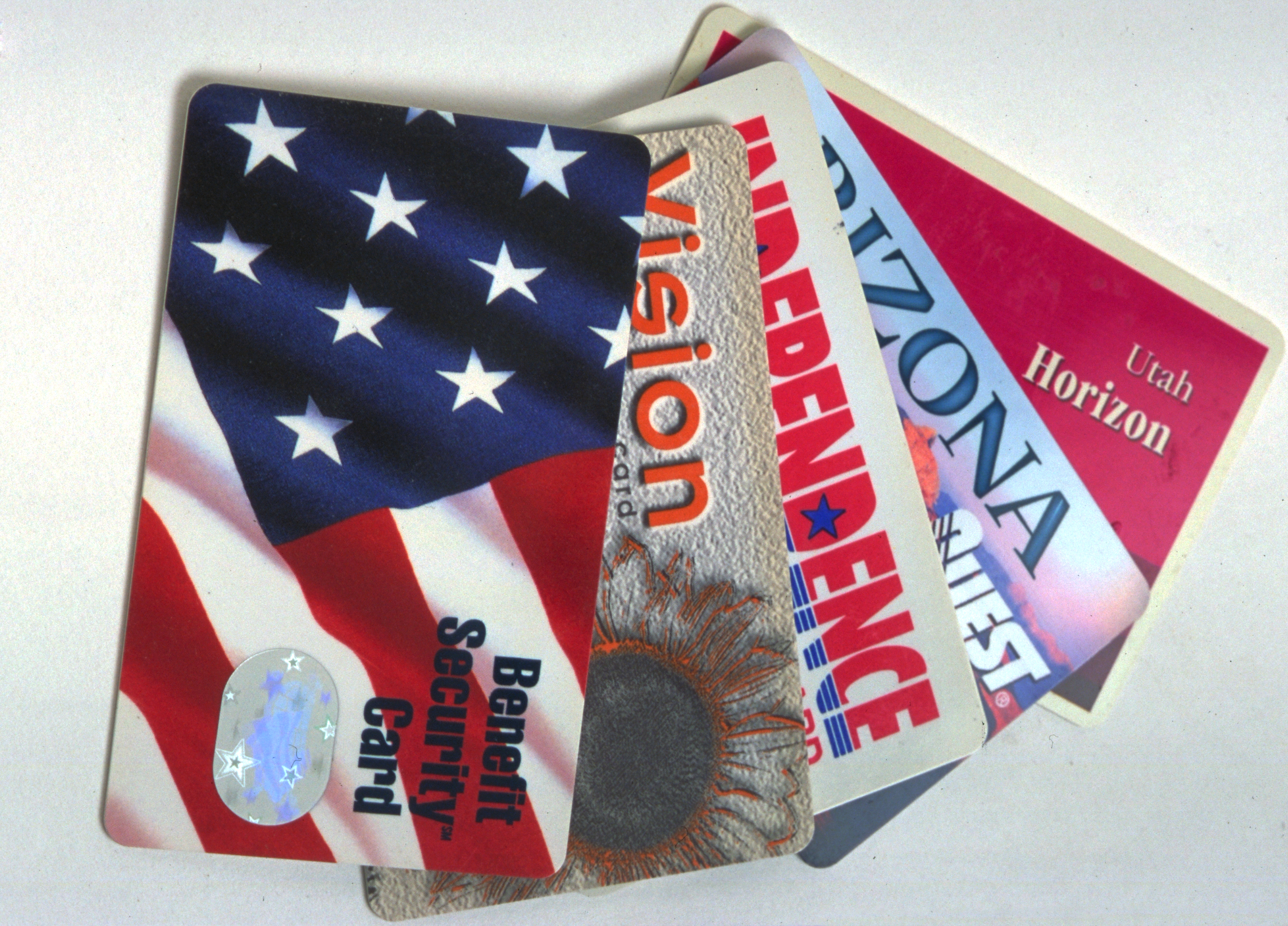
Colored Electronic Benefit Transfer (EBT) cards of certain states

=== Electronic benefit transfer ===
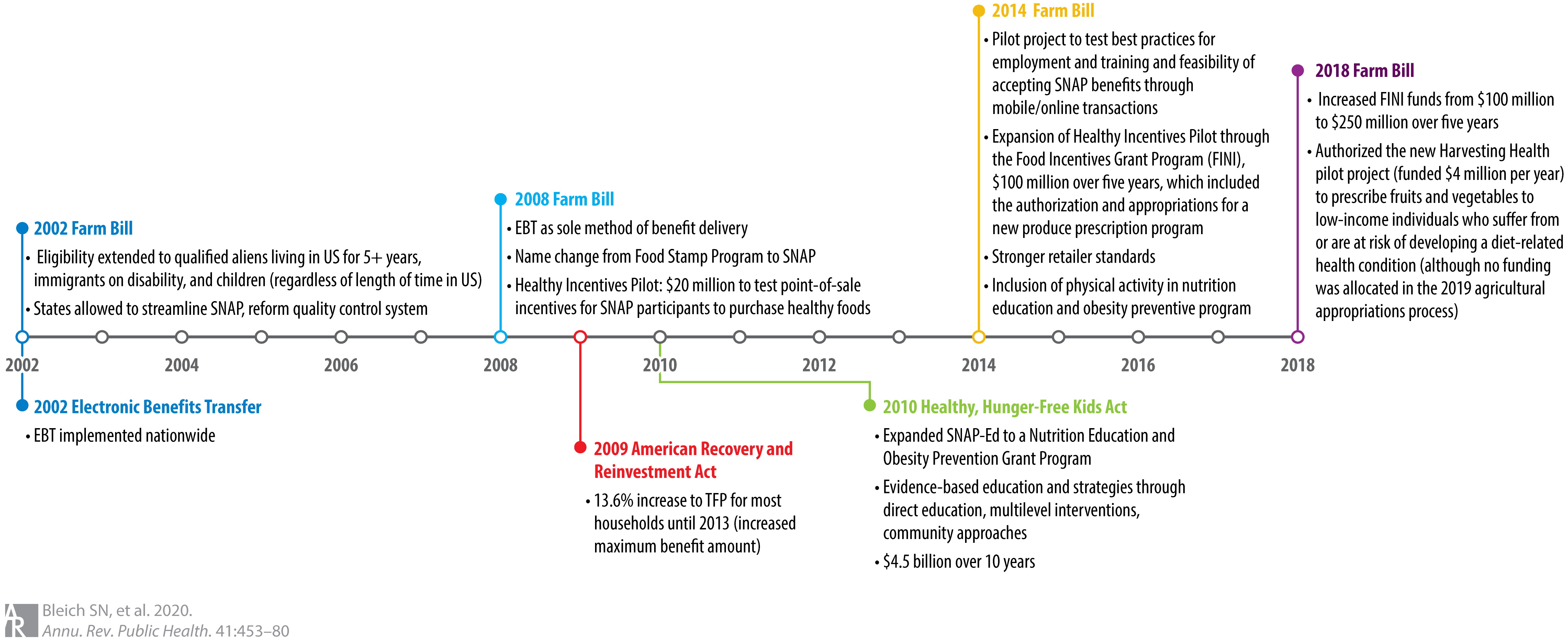
US legislation that promoted the public health impacts of SNAP, 2002–2018

In the late 1990s, the Food Stamp Program was revamped, with some states phasing out actual stamps in favor of a specialized debit card system known as Electronic Benefit Transfer (EBT), provided by private contractors. Many states merged the use of the EBT card for public welfare programs as well, such as cash assistance. The move was designed to save the government money by not printing the coupons, make benefits available immediately instead of requiring the recipient to wait for mailing or picking up the booklets in person, and reduce theft and diversion.

=== Renaming the Food Stamp Program ===
The 2008 farm bill renamed the Food Stamp Program to the Supplemental Nutrition Assistance Program (beginning October 2008) and replaced all references to "stamp" or "coupon" in federal law with "card" or "EBT". This was done to mark a more explicit focus on providing nutrition. It was also done to reduce usage of the stigmatized phrase "food stamps".

=== Temporary benefits increase from April 2009 to November 2013 ===
SNAP benefits temporarily increased with the passage of the American Recovery and Reinvestment Act of 2009 (ARRA), a federal stimulus package to help Americans affected by the Great Recession of 2007. Beginning in April 2009 and continuing through the expansion's expiration on November 1, 2013, the ARRA appropriated $45.2 billion to increase monthly benefit levels to an average of $133. This amounted to a 13.6 percent funding increase for SNAP recipients.

This temporary expansion expired on November 1, 2013, resulting in a relative benefit decrease for SNAP households; on average, benefits decreased by 5 percent. According to a Center on Budget and Policy Priorities report, the maximum monthly benefit for a family of four dropped from $668 to $632, while the maximum monthly benefit for an individual dropped from $200 to $189.

=== Corporate influence and support ===
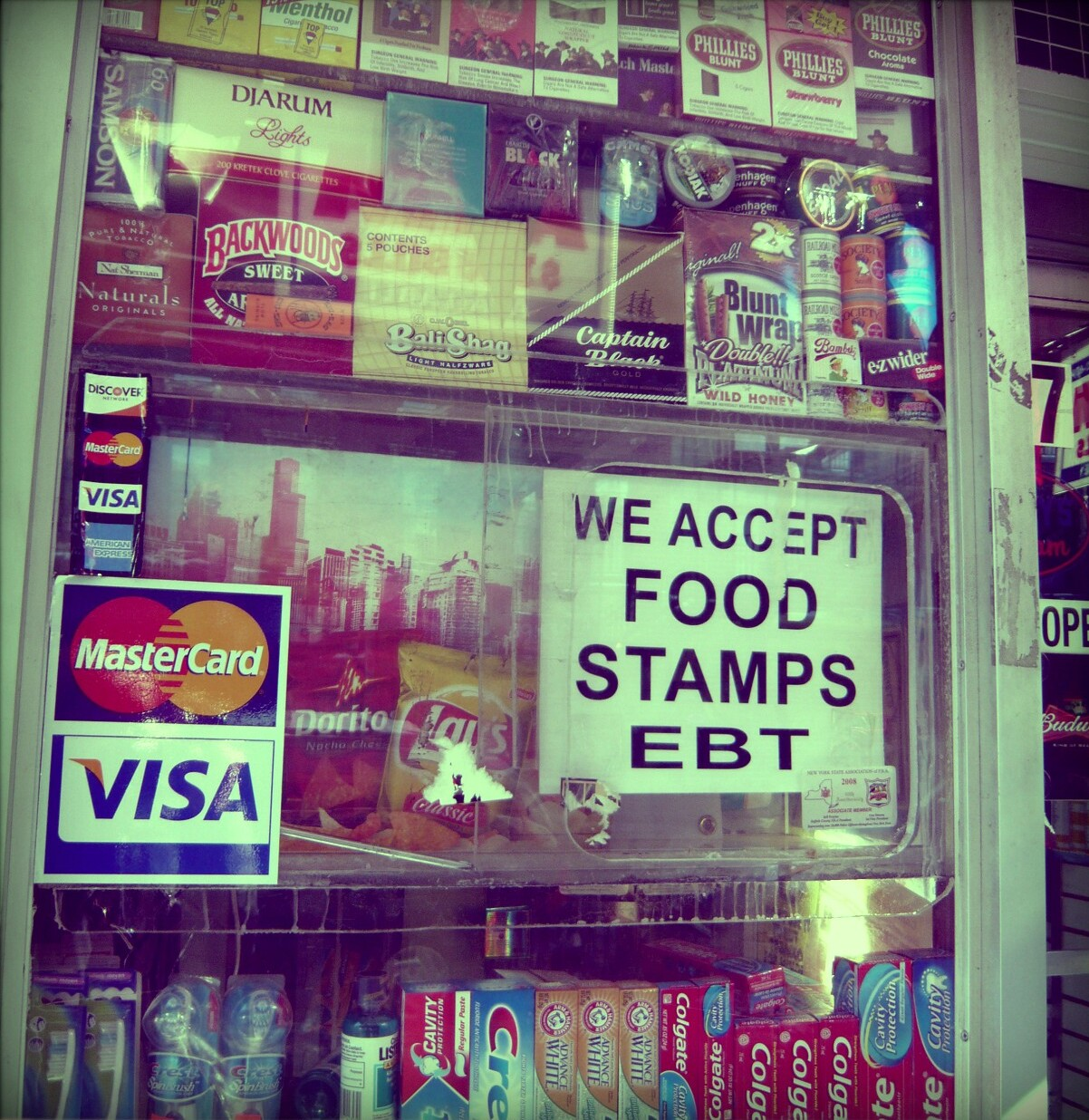
Brooklyn Deli with "We Accept Food Stamps EBT" sign

In June 2014, Mother Jones reported that "Overall, 18 percent of all food benefits money is spent at Walmart", and that Walmart had submitted a statement to the U.S. Securities and Exchange Commission stating,

Our business operations are subject to numerous risks, factors, and uncertainties, domestically and internationally, which are outside our control. These factors include... changes in the amount of payments made under the Supplemental Nutrition Assistance Plan and other public assistance plans, [and] changes in the eligibility requirements of public assistance plans.

Companies that have lobbied on behalf of SNAP include PepsiCo, The Coca-Cola Company, and the grocery chain Kroger. Kraft Foods, which receives "One-sixth [of its] revenues ... from food stamp purchases" also opposes food stamp cuts.

=== Proposed College Student Hunger Act of 2019 ===
Senator Elizabeth Warren and Congressman Al Lawson introduced the College Student Hunger Act of 2019 on July 17, 2019, in an attempt to extend SNAP benefits for college students in need; the act has not passed as of October 2022. The idea was to include both Pell Grant-eligible students and independent students. Warren and Lawson both believe that students have a right to both food and education, and the goal was to alleviate financial tension. This bill has been endorsed by several organizations including Bread for the World. Specifically, the Act would allow Pell-Grant eligible and independent students to qualify for benefits, lowers the 20 hours/week work requirement to 10 hours/week, and requires the Department of Education to notify Pell Grant eligible students of their SNAP eligibility. The student hunger pilot program will test different ways students can use SNAP benefits such as directly at the dining hall or indirectly to help pay for student meal plans.

=== 2020 COVID-19 and pandemic-EBT introduction ===
The Families First Coronavirus Response Act of 2020 provided the Secretary of Agriculture with authority to approve state agency plans for temporary emergency eligibility standards and benefit levels under the Food and Nutrition Act of 2008 after the COVID-19 pandemic began in 2020. These plans allowed for increased access to food and nutrition assistance, including increased benefits under the Supplemental Nutrition Assistance Program (SNAP). The Secretary of Agriculture could also waive certain requirements, such as work requirements, in order to ensure those in need had access to assistance. March 2020 is estimated to be the start date.

This provision applies to children who would otherwise be eligible for free or reduced price meals under the Richard B. Russell National School Lunch Act. It allows states to provide meals to children during the school closures due to COVID-19. It does not require states to provide meals to children who do not qualify for free or reduced price meals.

School children eligible for emergency nutrition benefits receive temporary benefits loaded onto their EBT cards. As of mid-summer 2020, all states and territories eligible to provide these benefits (except Guam) have selected the option and issued these benefits to replace meals lost during the 2019–2020 school year. These benefits provide children with essential nutrition, allowing them to focus on their studies and grow academically. The benefits are also instrumental in helping to reduce food insecurity among children.

=== 2021 Thrifty Food Plan modernization and update ===
As directed by the US Farm Bill Agriculture Improvement Act of 2018 and the Biden administration January 22, 2021 Executive Order, the USDA implemented the first cost adjustment to the Thrifty Food Plan since its introduction in 1975. The Thrifty Food Plan is not dependent on geographical location, rather everyone is allocated the same amount of money. The USDA went on to evaluate the four aspects including current food prices within the typical American diet, dietary guidance, and the available nutrients in food items. The Thrifty Food Plan, 2021, is based on the needs of a family of four as defined by law, and sets $835.57 as the monthly cost for the reference family. This is a 21.03% increase from the prior amount (adjusted for current prices), or an increase of $4.79 per day for the reference family of four. These changes are permanent, and went into effect October 1, 2021.

=== 2023 aid shrink ===
The SNAP emergency allotments, a temporary increase in benefits implemented at the start of the COVID-19 pandemic in March 2020, were ended in March 2023 under the Consolidated Appropriations Act, 2023. For the average recipient, the change would mean about $90 less per month.

=== 2025 legislative changes under OBBBA ===
In 2025, after the re-election of Donald Trump, Congress passed the One Big Beautiful Bill Act (P.L. 119-21) which cut funding to an array of social programs such as SNAP and Medicaid; it was signed into law by the President on July 4, 2025. OBBBA made major changes to SNAP, including:

- limiting future changes to the Thrifty Food Plan to the level of inflation;
- expanding the three-month time limit/work requirement to more recipients, including older adults and parents of children 14 and older;
- reducing the federal share of administrative costs to 25% (down from 50%);
- limiting immigrant eligibility for SNAP, denying assistance to refugees and other humanitarian immigrants;
- for the first time, requiring states to pay a portion of the cost of the benefits under SNAP. The level of the state share will depend on the error rate that the state achieves, and will range up to 15% of the benefit cost.

=== 2025 shutdown ===
SNAP is authorized by the Food and Nutrition Act of 2008. This law has since 1973 been periodically reauthorized by the farm bill, and the program was last reauthorized by the 2018 farm bill. For programs with mandatory spending authorized but not appropriated by the farm bill—such as SNAP—an appropriations act or continuing resolution could allow operations to continue. Many farm bill provisions expired in 2023 and then were extended through September 30, 2025. In a period of farm bill expiration, SNAP operations continue with the provision of appropriations.

The SNAP payments for November 2025 were delayed because of the 2025 U.S. federal government shutdown. Twenty-five states and the District of Columbia sued the federal government in federal court to prevent SNAP delays. Two federal judges ruled on October 31, 2025 that the Trump Administration had to pay food stamps during November, but the federal government appealed the ruling, arguing that federal law prohibited the release of funding for SNAP. After the shutdown ended on November 12, full SNAP benefits resumed, and the federal government withdrew its challenge before the Supreme Court.

=== 2026 ===
In May 2026, the Center on Budget and Policy Priorities estimated that, compared to July 2025, 1.6 million fewer people (half of them children) were receiving SNAP across a dozen states. USDA data showed that SNAP enrollment fell from 42.2 million people in May 2025 to 36.6 million in May 2026.

In June, there was a legislative hearing on whether SNAP benefits should restrict the purchase of sugar-sweetened beverages and junk food, as part of an ongoing debate over whether the program should only fight hunger or should attempt to regulate diet too.

In November, the U.S. Food and Nutrition Administration proposed that households that receive non-cash Temporary Assistance for Needy Families benefits be deemed ineligible for SNAP. This would cut an estimated 3.2 million households (6.3 million people) from SNAP. It would take effect in 2029.

== Eligibility ==
Because SNAP is a means-tested program, recipients must meet all eligibility criteria in order to receive benefits. There are income and resource requirements for SNAP, as well as specific requirements for immigrants, elderly persons and persons with disabilities.

=== Income requirements ===
For income, individuals and households may qualify for benefits if they earn a gross monthly income and a net monthly income (Note: Gross monthly income is the amount made each month before deductions (e.g., taxes, insurance, pensions, etc), while net monthly income is the amount after such deductions.) that is 130% and 100% or less, respectively, of the federal poverty level for a specific household size. For example: in Fiscal Year 2024, the SNAP-eligible gross monthly income limit is $1,580 for an individual. For a household of four, it is $3,250.

=== Work requirements ===
General work requirements apply to people aged 16 to 59 to participate in the program, exempting students, caregivers of children under 6 and incapacitated people, people unable to work due to a disability, and people in drug rehabilitation. Such recipients must work 30 hours a week, or register for work or participate in state training; they may not quit or decline a job offer without a good reason, or reduce hours below 30 per week if working. For able-bodied adults aged 18 to 49 without dependents under 18 in the household and who are not pregnant, there is a requirement for 80 hours per month spent at work, volunteering, workfare, or workforce training. Critics say opportunities for training or volunteering are limited. Individual states may waive the work requirements, with many states in high unemployment areas opting to loosen requirements for SNAP eligibility.

In December 2019, the Trump administration proposed to limit states' ability to issue eligibility waivers to single able-bodied adults between ages 18 and 49, which would result in ineligibility of SNAP benefits to an estimated 688,000 people in April 2020.

On July 4, 2025, the Trump administration's "One Big Beautiful Bill Act," or H.R. 1, went into effect. H.R. 1 expanded work requirements for the SNAP program and reduced federal funding by 20%, initiating the largest budget cuts in the history of the program. Older adults up to age 65 are now required to meet work requirements of at least 20 hours a week, as are parents whose youngest child is at least 14. The bill eliminated exemptions for veterans, individuals experiencing homelessness, and former foster youth. The Congressional Budget Office estimates the expanded work requirements will cause 2.9 million Americans to lose SNAP coverage.

=== Resource requirements ===
There is also a resource requirement for SNAP, although eligibility requirements vary slightly from state to state. Generally speaking, households may have up to $2,250 in a bank account or other countable sources. If at least one person is age 60 or older and/or has disabilities, households may have $3,500 in countable resources.

=== Housing expenditure ===
The lack of affordable housing in urban areas means that money that could have been spent on food is spent on housing expenses. Housing is generally considered affordable when it costs 30% or less of total household income; rising housing costs have made this ideal difficult to attain.

This is especially true in New York City, where 28% of rent stabilized tenants spend more than half their income on rent. Among lower income families the percentage is much higher. According to an estimate by the Community Service Society, 65% of New York City families living below the federal poverty line are paying more than half of their income toward rent.

The current eligibility criteria attempt to address this, by including a deduction for "excess shelter costs". This applies only to households that spend more than half of their net income on rent. For the purpose of this calculation, a household's net income is obtained by subtracting certain deductions from their gross (before deductions) income. If the household's total expenditures on rent exceed 50% of that net income, then the net income is further reduced by the amount of rent that exceeds 50% of net income. For 2007, this deduction can be no more than $417, except in households that include an elderly or disabled person. Deductions include:

1. a standard deduction that is subtracted from income for all recipients,
2. an earned income deduction reflecting taxes and work expenses,
3. a deduction for dependent care expenses related to work or training (up to certain limits),
4. a deduction for child support payments,
5. a deduction for medical expenses above a set amount per month (only available to elderly and disabled recipients), and
6. a deduction for excessively high shelter expenses.

The adjusted net income, including the deduction for excess shelter costs, is used to determine whether a household is eligible for food stamps.

=== Immigrant status and eligibility ===
The 1996 Personal Responsibility and Work Opportunity Act (PRWORA) sharply restricted immigrant eligibility for food stamps. Before 1996, immigrants had generally been eligible for food stamps on the same terms as citizens. PRWORA established two categories of noncitizens: "qualified immigrants" — including legal permanent residents (LPRs, or green card holders), refugees, asylees, and certain other protected statuses — and all others, who are ineligible. "Non-qualified" noncitizens include people lawfully present in the U.S. with non-immigrant visas (such as student or work visas) or with temporary protected status.

The 2002 Farm Bill restored SNAP eligibility to "qualified" immigrants that:

- Have lived in the country for 5 years; or
- Are receiving disability-related assistance or benefits; or
- are children under 18

In 2025, the One Big Beautiful Bill Act (P.L 119-21) significantly narrowed immigrant eligibility for SNAP. The law amended the Food and Nutrition Act of 2008 to limit SNAP eligibility among noncitizens to lawful permanent residents, Cuban and Haitian entrants, and nationals of the Compact of Free Association (COFA) countries (the Marshall Islands, Micronesia and Palau). Categories of immigrants that had previously been eligible, including refugees, asylees, and survivors of trafficking, were rendered ineligible. The Congressional Budget Office estimated that these changes would reduce SNAP participation by approximately 90,000 people on average each month.

Eligible household members can get SNAP benefits even if there are other members of the household that are not eligible. Undocumented immigrants, including Deferred Action for Childhood Arrivals (DACA) recipients, are not eligible for SNAP.

== Administration ==
Each state administers SNAP separately. The Food and Nutrition Service maintains an online directory with information regarding each state's processes.

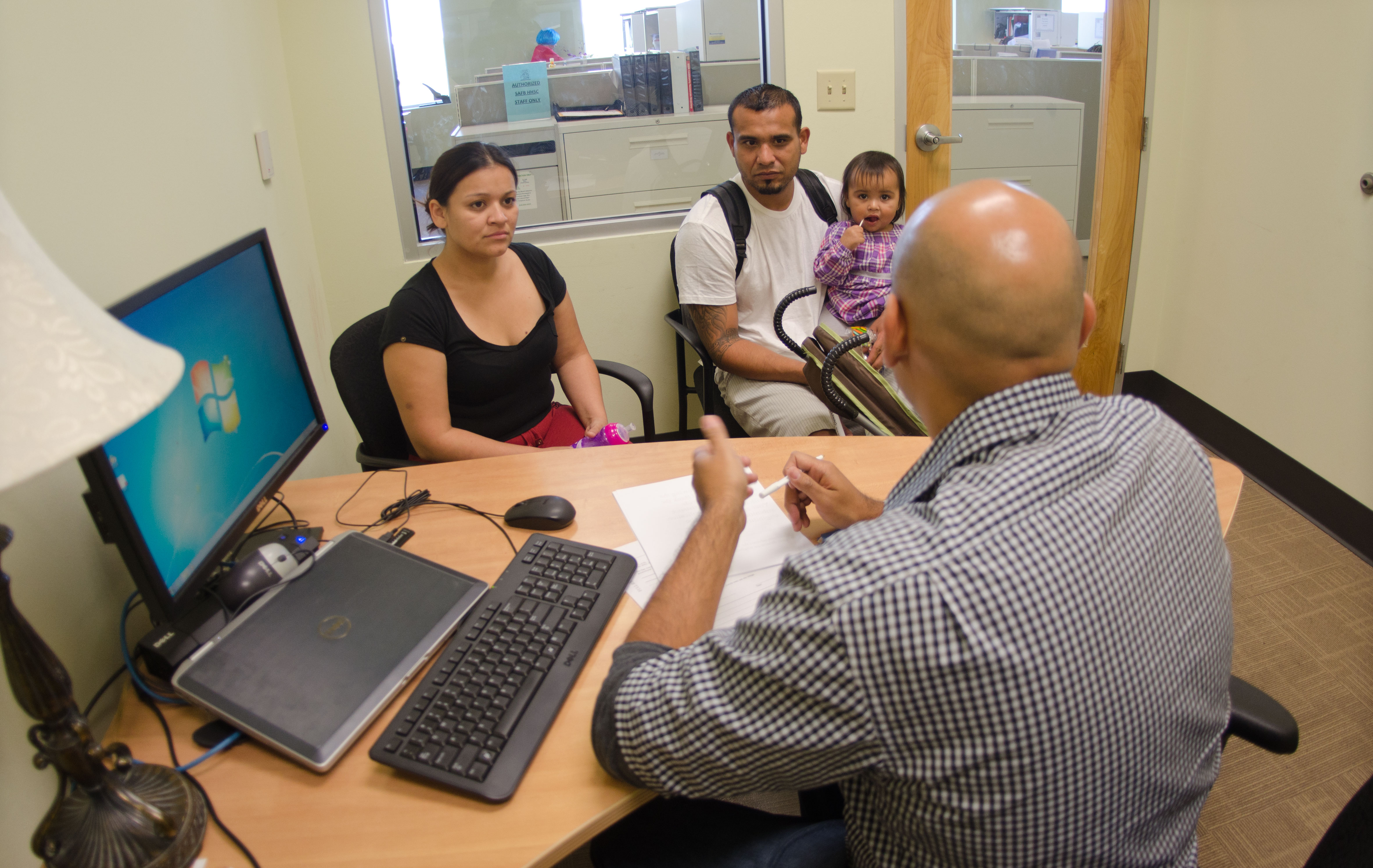
San Antonio Food Bank providing information and the SNAP application to help the family with their needs

== Benefit allotment and eligible food items ==
SNAP benefits ensure households can purchase a thrifty nutritious food plan given their net income and household size. The benefit allotment subtracts 30% of net monthly income from a maximum monthly allotment given household size. Net income accounts for deductions such as excess shelter costs, expected taxes, and dependent care. USDA sets the maximum monthly allotment based on the annual thrifty food plan, their lowest cost food plan that still maintains a healthy diet. For example, a family of four with no net income receives the maximum monthly allotment of $973 in 2024.

As per USDA rules, households can use SNAP benefits to purchase:

- fruits and vegetables
- breads and cereals
- dairy products
- meats, poultry, and fish
- snack foods and non-alcoholic beverages
- Plants and seeds which are fit for household consumption.

Additionally, restaurants operating in certain areas may be permitted to accept SNAP benefits from eligible candidates like elderly, homeless or disabled people in return for affordable meals.

However, the USDA is clear that households cannot use SNAP benefits to purchase the following:

- Wine, beer, liquor, cigarettes or tobacco
- Certain nonfood items like:
  - hygiene (soaps, deodorant, menstrual care)
  - paper products, household supplies
  - pet foods
- Hot prepared foods in grocery stores
- Food items that are consumable in the store
- Vitamins and medicines
- Live animals and birds.

== State options ==
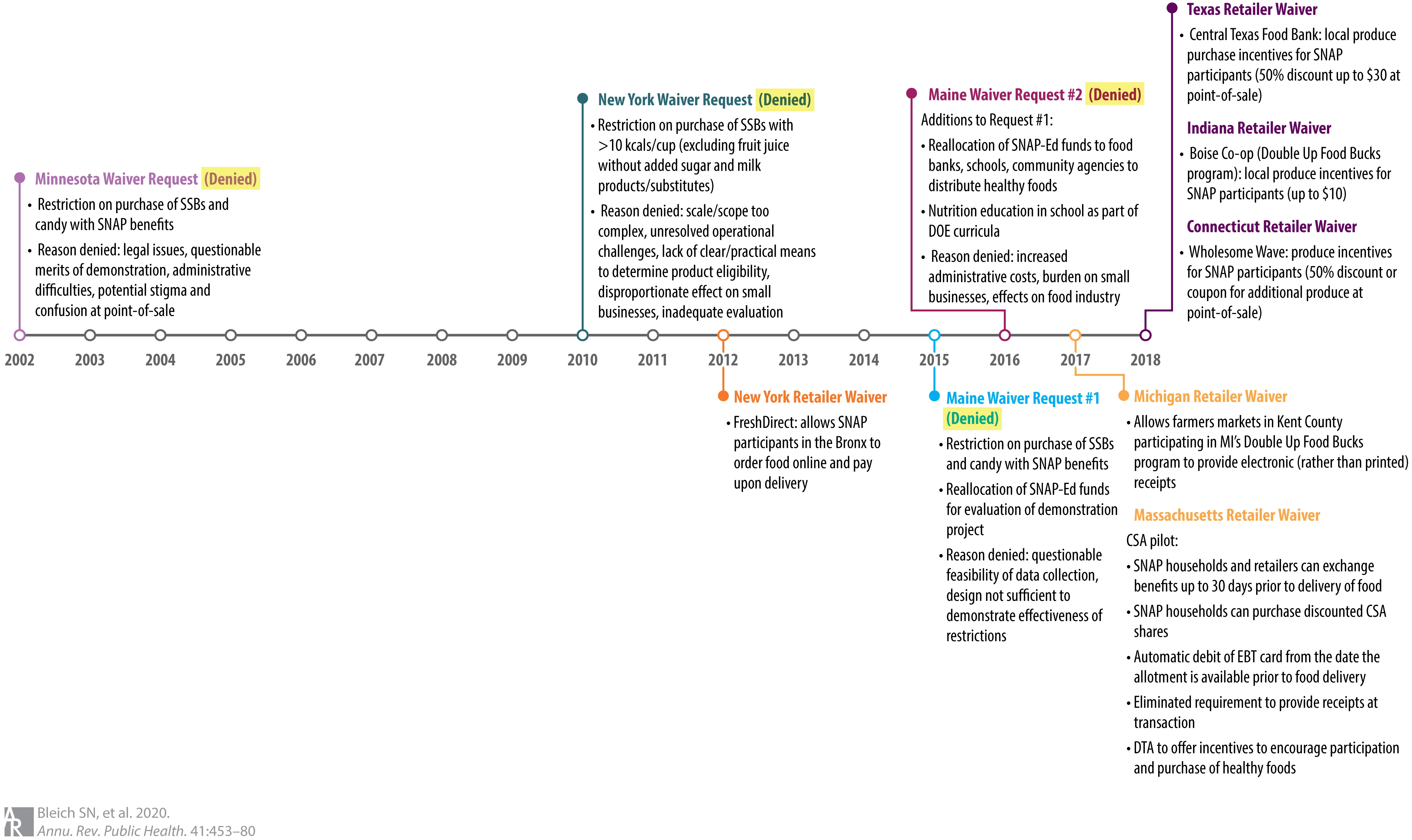
State waiver requests for SNAP

States are allowed under federal law to administer SNAP in different ways. As of April 2015, the USDA had published eleven periodic State Options Reports outlining variations in how states have administered the program. The USDA's most recent State Options Report, published in April 2015, summarizes:

SNAP's statutes, regulations, and waivers provide State agencies with various policy options. State agencies use this flexibility to adapt their programs to meet the needs of eligible, low‐income people in their States. Modernization and technology have provided States with new opportunities and options in administering the program. Certain options may facilitate program design goals, such as removing or reducing barriers to access for low-income families and individuals, or providing better support for those working or looking for work. This flexibility helps States better target benefits to those most in need, streamline program administration and field operations, and coordinate SNAP activities with those of other programs.

Some areas of differences among states include: when and how frequently SNAP recipients must report household circumstances; on whether the state agency acts on all reported changes or only some changes; whether the state uses a simplified method for determining the cost of doing business in cases where an applicant is self-employed; and whether legally obligated child support payments made to non-household members are counted as an income exclusion rather than a deduction.

State agencies also have an option to call their program SNAP; whether to continue to refer to their program under its former name, the Food Stamp Program; or whether to choose an alternate name. Among the 50 states plus the District of Columbia, 32 call their program SNAP; five continue to call the program the Food Stamp Program; and 16 have adopted their own name. For example, California calls its SNAP implementation "CalFresh", while Arizona calls its program "Nutrition Assistance".

== Impact ==
During the recession of 2008, SNAP participation hit an all-time high. Arguing in support for SNAP, the Food Research and Action Center argued that "putting more resources quickly into the hands of the people most likely to turn around and spend it can both boost the economy and cushion the hardships on vulnerable people who face a constant struggle against hunger." Researchers have found that every $1 that is spent from SNAP results in $1.73 of economic activity. In California, the cost-benefit ratio is even higher: for every $1 spent from SNAP between $3.67 to $8.34 is saved in health care costs. The Congressional Budget Office also rated an increase in SNAP benefits as one of the two most cost-effective of all spending and tax options it examined for boosting growth and jobs in a weak economy.

=== Participants ===
A summary statistical report indicated that an average of 44.2 million people used the program in FY 2016, down from 45.8 million in 2015 and below the 2013 peak of 47.6 million. SNAP is able to support 75% of those eligible for the program. Nearly 72 percent of SNAP participants are in families with children; more than one-quarter of participants are in households with seniors or people with disabilities.

As of 2013, more than 15% of the U.S. population receive food assistance, and more than 20% in Georgia, Kentucky, Louisiana, New Mexico, Oregon, and Tennessee. Washington, D.C. was the highest share of the population to receive food assistance at over 23%.

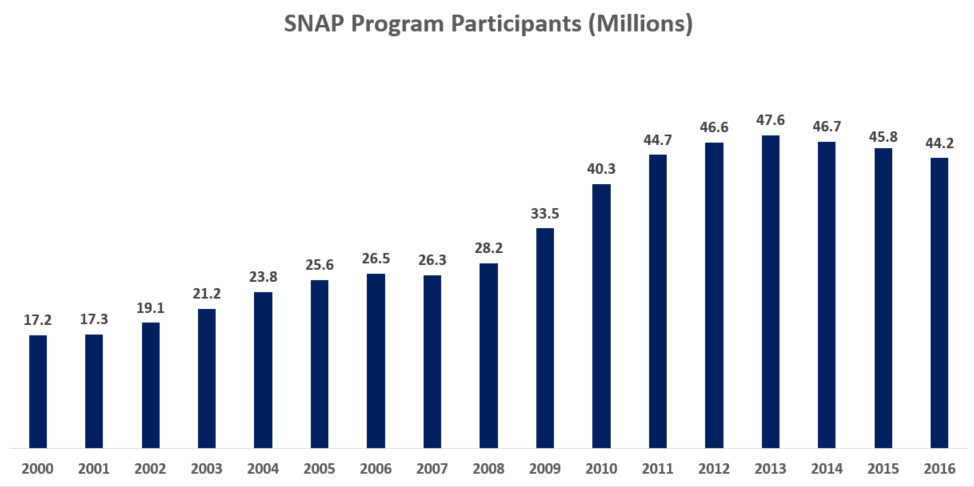
Average number of persons participating in the SNAP, 2000–2016. The number of participants increased due to the Great Recession, peaking in 2013, and has since fallen.

According to the U.S. Department of Agriculture (based on a study of data gathered in Fiscal Year 2010), statistics for the food stamp program are as follows:

- 49% of all participant households have children (17 or younger), and 55% of those are single-parent households.
- 15% of all participant households have elderly (age 60 or over) members.
- 20% of all participant households have non-elderly disabled members.
- The average gross monthly income per food stamp household is $731; The average net income is $336.
- 37% of participants are White, 22% are African-American, 10% are Hispanic, 2% are Asian, 4% are Native American, and 19% are of unknown race or ethnicity.

Based on income and family structure, SNAP does not target specific racial and ethnic groups. As a result, SNAP benefits reach a broad range of disadvantaged households; yet, minority households report food insecurity at a rate more than twice that of White households.

=== Costs ===
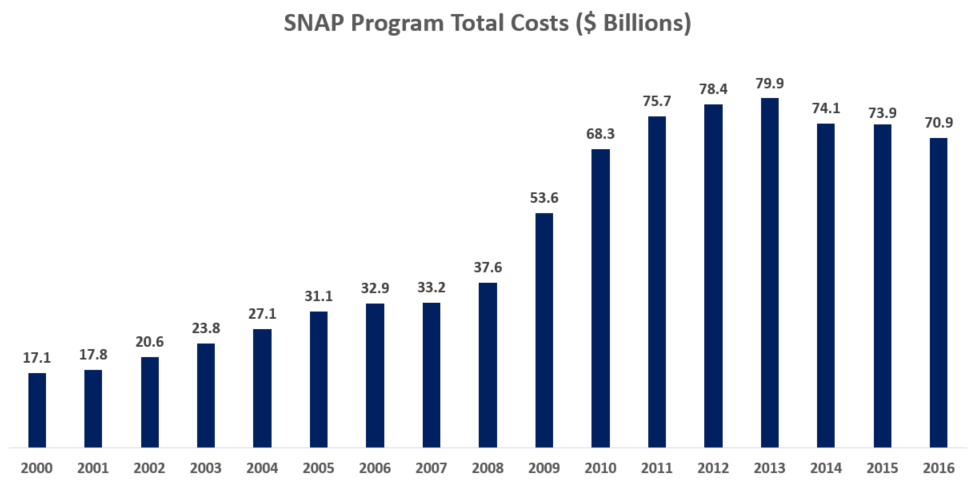
Total program costs from 2000 to 2016. The amount increased sharply after 2008 due to the Great Recession, and has fallen since 2013 as the economy recovers.

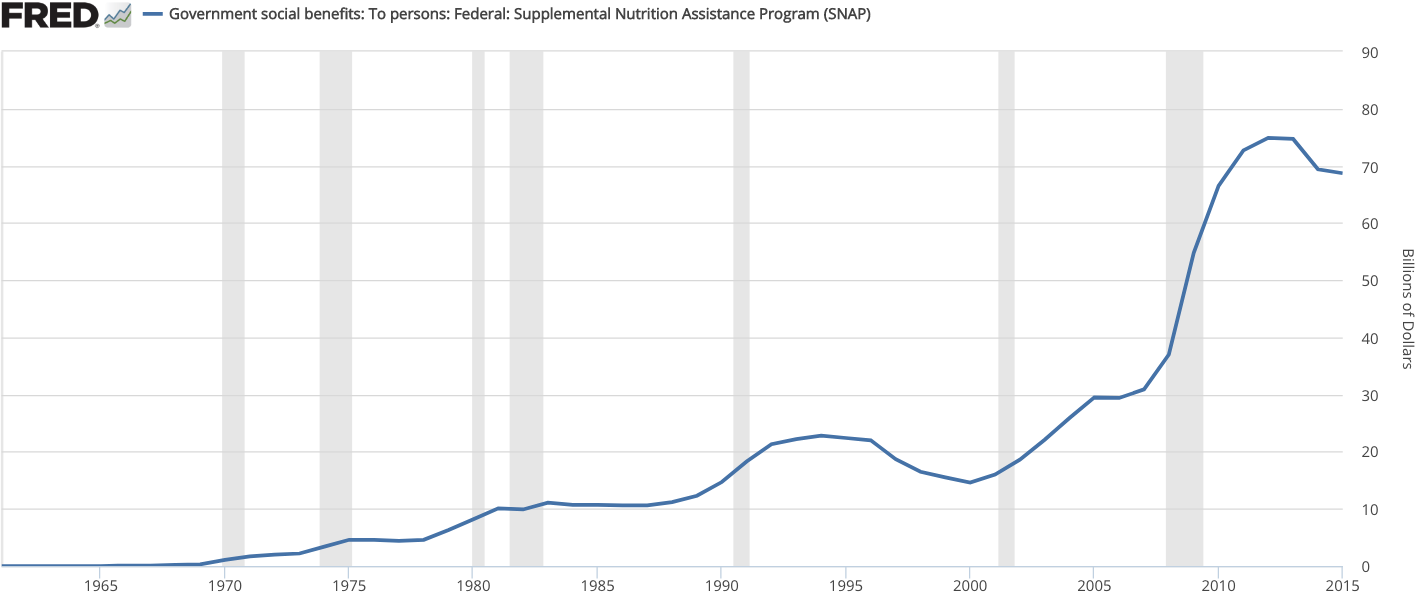
SNAP benefits cost since the 1960s

Amounts paid to program beneficiaries rose from $28.6 billion in 2005 to $76 billion in 2013, falling back to $66.6 billion by 2016. This increase was due to the high unemployment rate (leading to higher SNAP participation) and the increased benefit per person with the passing of ARRA. SNAP average monthly benefits increased from $96.18 per person to $133.08 per person. Other program costs, which include the Federal share of State administrative expenses, Nutrition Education, and Employment and Training, amounted to roughly $3.7 million in 2013. There were cuts into the program's budget introduced in 2014 that were estimated to save $8.6 billion over 10 years. Some of the states are looking for measures within the states to balance the cuts, so they would not affect the recipients of the federal aid program.

=== Politics ===
According to a 2021 study, the staggered decade-long rollout of the American Food Stamp Program led to greater support for Democrats: "Overall, I find that Democrats—at the center of the program's enacting coalition—gained votes when the program was implemented locally, apparently through mobilization of new supporters rather than the conversion of political opponents."

=== Health ===
A 2018 study found that toddlers and preschoolers in households with access to food stamps had better health outcomes at ages 6 to 16 than similar children who did not have access to food stamps. A 2019 study found, "higher participation in SNAP is associated with lower overall and male suicide rates. Increasing SNAP participation by one standard deviation (4.5% of the state population) during the study period could have saved the lives of approximately 31,600 people overall and 24,800 men."

==== Brain health and aging ====
A 2022 study showed that users of the program aged 50 and older had slower memory loss, or "about 2 fewer years of cognitive aging over a 10-year period compared with non-users", despite the program having nearly no conditions for the sustainability and healthiness of the food products purchased with the coupons (or coupon-credits).

==== Obesity prevalence amongst youth ====
Although SNAP has had positive impacts on reducing food insecurity, the nutrition options offered by the program do not consistently meet dietary guidelines. A study conducted in 2023 showed that participating children in particular perform poorly on health indicators compared with income-eligible and higher income nonparticipants.

==== Seeking medical attention ====
SNAP benefits appear to improve the health of participants. Researchers found that SNAP increases the likelihood of users to seek medical attention and getting check-ups, compared to non-users. To add on, they also looked at the rates and outcomes of self-reporting their health and found that users are also likely to report their well-being, good.

=== Food security and insecurity ===
Low income participants along with SNAP participants spend similar amount on food. Yet, SNAP participants continue to experience greater food insecurity than non participants. This is believed to be a reflection of the welfare of individuals who take the time to apply for SNAP benefits rather than the shortcomings of SNAP. Households facing the greatest hardships are the most likely to bear the burden of applying for program benefits. Therefore, SNAP participants tend to be, on average, less food secure than other low-income nonparticipants. SNAP has been seen to provide around $1.40 less in terms of benefits than individuals need. Thus SNAP participants need to visit food banks, food parcels, food distribution sites, etc. in order to get the enough nutritious food.

Self-selection by more food-needy households into SNAP makes it difficult to observe positive effects on food security from survey data, but data such as average income can be compared. SNAP allows individuals to go to grocery stores and buy what foods are needed with their EBT cards. However, simply receiving food is not enough, since many individuals do not know which foods are most nutritious, nor how to prepare and cook those foods.

Crime

A 2019 study in the American Economic Journal: Economic Policy found that a lifetime food stamp ban (as implemented by the 1996 Welfare reform) for convicted drug felons led to greater recidivism. The study found that this applied in particular for financially motivated crimes, which the authors said suggested "that the cut in benefits causes ex-convicts to return to crime to make up for the lost transfer income."

A 2021 study found that the availability of food stamps during early childhood substantially reduced the likelihood of a criminal conviction in young adulthood. The study concluded that the social benefits of food stamps were substantial enough to outweigh the costs of the program.

Poverty

Because SNAP is a means-tested entitlement program, participation rates are closely related to the number of individuals living in poverty in a given period. In periods of economic recession, SNAP enrollment tends to increase and in periods of prosperity, SNAP participation tends to be lower. Unemployment is therefore also related to SNAP participation. However, ERS data shows that poverty and SNAP participation levels have continued to rise following the 2008 recession, even though unemployment rates have leveled off. Poverty levels are the strongest correlates for program participation.

SNAP benefits [have led] to greater expenditures in healthcare, childcare, education and housing. Low wages and unstable working conditions have also impacted the ability to pay for transportation costs, which is needed for access to grocery stores and supermarkets.

==== College students ====
Food insecurity is also prevalent in college students as well. College students experience food insecurities much higher than US adult households. These issues occur for college students because some are unable to afford any due to high tuition fees, lack of time to acquire food or cook, and also unawareness of campus resources. A study looking at challenges in students when applying for SNAP benefits found that increasing the availability and working together with Campus Basic Needs Centers has improved students in applying and reaching out to SNAP resources.

==== Military ====
The General Accounting Office reported that "approximately 13,600 and 25,200 military households redeemed food stamps at commissaries in 1979 and 1980, respectively."

In 2018–2019, 6.6% of veterans received SNAP. In 2021–2023, this had risen to 8%.

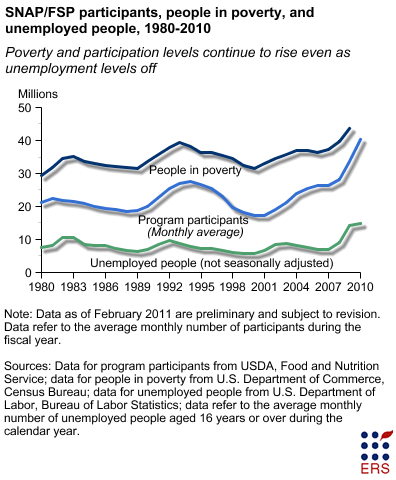
SNAP is closely related to poverty and unemployment.

=== Income maintenance ===
The purpose of the Food Stamp Program as laid out in its implementation was to assist low-income households in obtaining adequate and nutritious diets. According to Peter H. Rossi, a sociologist whose work involved evaluation of social programs, "the program rests on the assumption that households with restricted incomes may skimp on food purchases and live on diets that are inadequate in quantity and quality, or, alternatively skimp on other necessities to maintain an adequate diet". Food stamps, as many like Rossi, MacDonald, and Eisinger contend, are used not only for increasing food but also as income maintenance. Income maintenance is money that households are able to spend on other things because they no longer have to spend it on food. According to various studies shown by Rossi, because of income maintenance only about $0.17–$0.47 more is being spent on food for every food stamp dollar than was spent prior to individuals receiving food stamps.

=== Diet quality ===
Many low income areas have fewer grocery stores and within those, poorer quality foods. CalFresh can help expand family's budgets so they can afford healthy, nourishing foods. Studies are inconclusive as to whether SNAP has a direct effect on the nutritional quality of food choices made by participants. Unlike other federal programs that provide food subsidies, i.e. the Supplemental Nutrition Assistance Program for Women, Infants and Children (WIC), SNAP does not have nutritional standards for purchases. Critics of the program suggest that this lack of structure represents a missed opportunity for public health advancement and cost containment. In April 2013, the USDA research body, the Economic Research Service (ERS), published a study that examined diet quality in SNAP participants compared to low-income nonparticipants. The study revealed a difference in diet quality between SNAP participants and low-income nonparticipants, finding that SNAP participants score slightly lower on the Healthy Eating Index (HEI) than nonparticipants. The study also concluded that SNAP increases the likelihood that participants will consume whole fruit by 23 percentage points. However, the analysis also suggests that SNAP participation decreases participants' intake of dark green and orange vegetables by a modest amount.

A 2016 study found no evidence that SNAP increased expenditures on tobacco by beneficiaries.

=== Macroeconomic effect ===
The USDA's Economic Research Service explains: "SNAP is a counter-cyclical government assistance program—it provides assistance to more low-income households during an economic downturn or recession and to fewer households during an economic expansion. The rise in SNAP participation during an economic downturn results in greater SNAP expenditures which, in turn, stimulate the economy."

In 2011, U.S. Agriculture Secretary Tom Vilsack gave a statement regarding SNAP benefits: "Every dollar of SNAP benefits generates $1.84 in the economy in terms of economic activity." Vilsack's estimate was based on a 2002 USDA study which found that "ultimately, the additional $5 billion of FSP (Food Stamp Program) expenditures triggered an increase in total economic activity (production, sales, and value of shipments) of $9.2 billion and an increase in jobs of 82,100", or $1.84 stimulus for every dollar spent.

A January 2008 report by Moody's Analytics chief economist Mark Zandi analyzed measures of the Economic Stimulus Act of 2008 and found that in a weak economy, every $1 in SNAP expenditures generates $1.73 in real GDP increase, making it the most effective stimulus among all the provisions of the act, including both tax cuts and spending increases.

A 2010 report by Kenneth Hanson published by the USDA's Economic Research Service estimated that a $1 billion increase in SNAP expenditures increases economic activity (GDP) by $1.79 billion (i.e., the GDP multiplier is 1.79). The same report also estimated that the "preferred jobs impact ... are the 8,900 full-time equivalent jobs plus self-employed or the 9,800 full-time and part-time jobs plus self-employed from $1 billion of SNAP benefits."

=== Local economic effects ===
In March 2013, The Washington Post reported that one-third of Woonsocket, Rhode Island's population used food stamps, putting local merchants on a "boom or bust" cycle each month when EBT payments were deposited. The Post stated that "a federal program that began as a last resort for a few million hungry people has grown into an economic lifeline for entire towns." And this growth "has been especially swift in once-prosperous places hit by the housing bust".

In addition to local town merchants, national retailers are starting to take in an increasing large percentage of SNAP benefits. For example, "Walmart estimates it takes in about 18% of total U.S. outlays on food stamps."

=== Fraud and abuse ===
According to an April 2025 Congressional Research Service report, SNAP fraud was "rare" and that many instances of overpayments were due to unintentional errors.

In March 2012, the USDA published its fifth report in a series of periodic analyses to estimate the extent of trafficking in SNAP; that is, selling or otherwise converting SNAP benefits for cash payouts. Although trafficking does not directly increase costs to the Federal Government, it diverts benefits from their intended purpose of helping low-income families access a nutritious diet. Trafficking may also indirectly increase costs by encouraging participants to stay in the program longer than intended, or by incentivizing new participants seeking to profit from trafficking. FNS considers trafficking to be the most egregious program violation and aggressively acts to control it by using SNAP purchase data to identify suspicious transaction patterns, conducting undercover investigations, and collaborating with other investigative agencies.

Trafficking diverted an estimated one cent of each SNAP dollar ($330 million annually) from SNAP benefits between 2006 and 2008. Trafficking has declined over time from nearly 4 percent in the 1990s. About 8.2 percent of all stores trafficked from 2006 to 2008 compared to the 10.5 percent of SNAP authorized stores involved in trafficking in 2011. A variety of store characteristics and settings were related to the level of trafficking. Although large stores accounted for 87.3 percent of all SNAP redemptions, they only accounted for about 5.4 percent of trafficking redemptions. Trafficking was much less likely to occur among publicly owned than privately owned stores and was much less likely among stores in areas with less poverty rather than more. The total annual value of trafficked benefits increased at about the same rate as overall program growth. The current estimate of total SNAP dollars trafficked is higher than observed in the previous 2002–2005 period. This increase is consistent, however, with the almost 37 percent growths in average annual SNAP benefits from the 2002–2005 study periods to the most recent one. The methodology used to generate these estimates has known limitations. However, given variable data and resources, it is the most practical approach available to FNS. Further improvements to SNAP trafficking estimates would require new resources to assess the prevalence of trafficking among a random sample of stores.

The USDA report released in August 2013 says the dollar value of trafficking increased to 1.3 percent, up from 1 percent in the USDA's 2006–2008 survey, and "About 18 percent of those stores classified as convenience stores or small groceries were estimated to have trafficked. For larger stores (supermarkets and large groceries), only 0.32 percent were estimated to have trafficked. In terms of redemptions, about 17 percent of small groceries redemptions and 14 percent of convenience store redemptions were estimated to have been trafficked. This compares with a rate of 0.2 percent for large stores."

The USDA, in December 2011, announced new policies to attempt to curb waste, fraud, and abuse. These changes will include stiffer penalties for retailers who are caught participating in illegal or fraudulent activities. "The department is proposing increasing penalties for retailers and providing states with access to large federal databases they would be required to use to verify information from applicants. SNAP benefit fraud, generally in the form of store employees buying EBT cards from recipients is widespread in urban areas, with one in seven corner stores engaging in such behavior, according to a recent government estimate. There are in excess of 200,000 stores, and we have 100 agents spread across the country. Some do undercover work, but the principal way we track fraud is through analyzing electronic transactions" for suspicious patterns, USDA Under Secretary Kevin Concannon told The Washington Times. Also, states will be given additional guidance that will help develop a tighter policy for those seeking to effectively investigate fraud and clarifying the definition of trafficking.

The State of Utah developed a system called "eFind" to monitor, evaluate and cross-examine qualifying and reporting data of recipients assets. Utah's eFind system is a "back end", web-based system that gathers, filters, and organizes information from various federal, state, and local databases. The data in eFind is used to help state eligibility workers determine applicants' eligibility for public assistance programs, including Medicaid, CHIP, the Supplemental Nutrition Assistance Program (SNAP), Temporary Assistance for Needy Families (TANF), and child care assistance. When information is changed in one database, the reported changes become available to other departments utilizing the system. This system was developed with federal funds and it is available to other states free of charge.

The USDA only reports direct fraud and trafficking in benefits, which was officially estimated at $858 million in 2012. The Cato Institute reports that there was another $2.2 billion in erroneous payouts in 2009. Cato also reported that the erroneous payout rate dropped significantly from 5.6 percent in 2007 to 3.8 percent in 2011.

According to the Government Accountability Office, at a 2009 count, there was a payment error rate of 4.36% of SNAP benefits down from 9.86% in 1999. A 2003 analysis found that two-thirds of all improper payments were the fault of the caseworker, not the participant. There are also instances of fraud involving exchange of SNAP benefits for cash and/or for items not eligible for purchase with EBT cards. In 2011, the Michigan program raised eligibility requirements for full-time college students, to save taxpayer money and to end student use of monthly SNAP benefits.

==== Water dumping/container deposit cashing fraud ====
In February 2013, the USDA expanded the definition of benefits trafficking to include indirect exchanges and "water dumping". The USDA defines water dumping as "purchase of beverages in containers with returnable deposits for the sole purpose of discarding the contents and returning the containers to obtain cash refund deposits"

In Maine, incidents of recycling fraud have occurred in the past where individuals once committed fraud by using their EBT cards to buy canned or bottled beverages (requiring a deposit to be paid at the point of purchase for each beverage container), dump the contents out so the empty beverage container could be returned for deposit redemption, and thereby, allowed these individuals to eventually purchase non-EBT authorized products with cash from the beverage container deposits. In January 2011, Maine state prosecutors requested local law enforcement agencies to send reports of "water dumping" to welfare fraud prosecutor in the state attorney general's office. In January 2016, a Maine woman, Linda Goodman, who purchased $125 in bottled water, dumping them and redeeming containers for cash to purchase alcohol, was charged with welfare fraud and pleaded no contest to SNAP trafficking. She was fined and suspended from SNAP eligibility for one year.

== Role of SNAP in healthy diets ==
=== Healthy Incentives Pilot ===
The 2008 Farm Bill authorized $20 million to be spent on pilot projects to determine whether incentives provided to SNAP recipients at the point-of-sale would increase the purchase of fruits, vegetables, or other healthful foods.

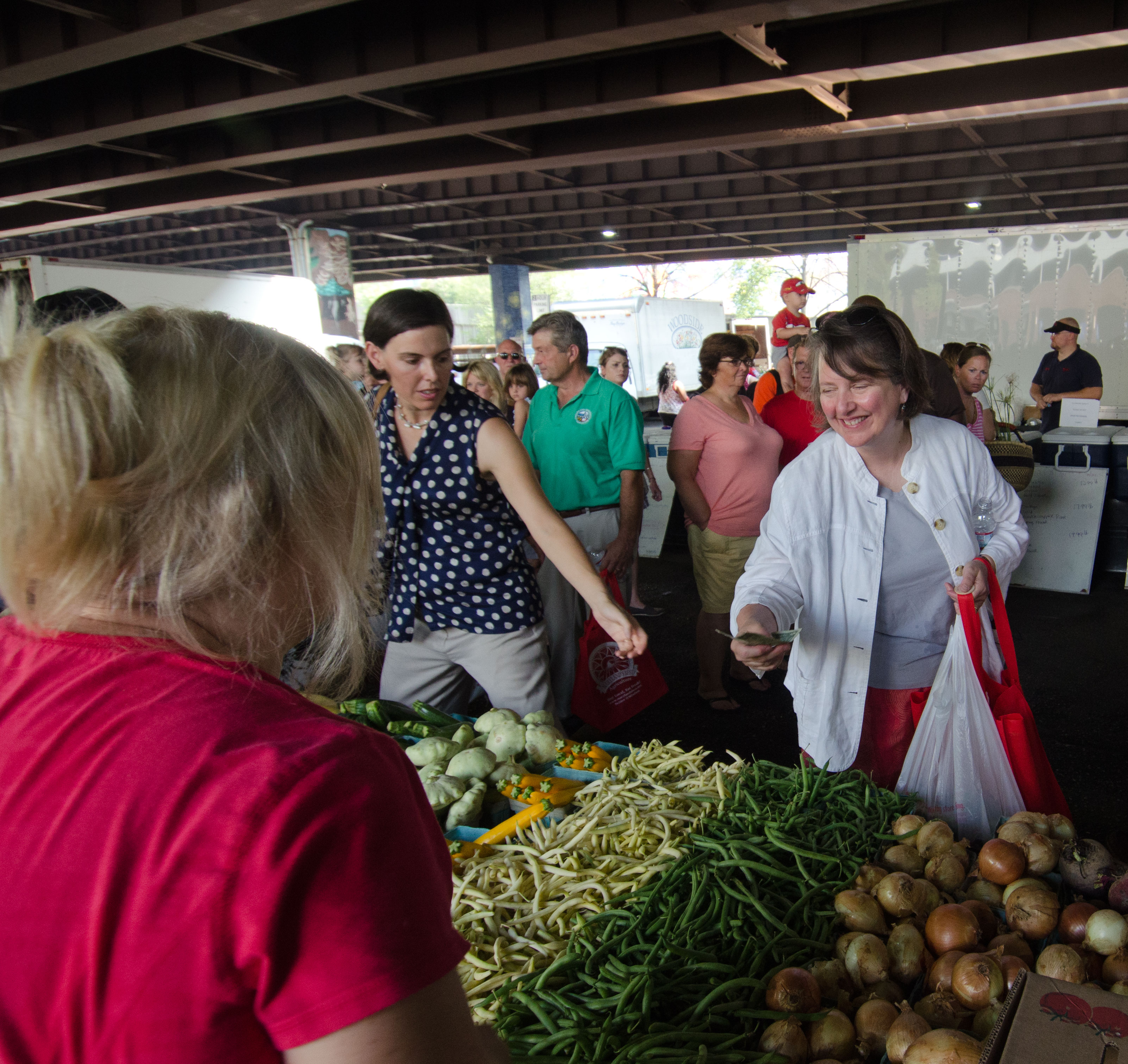
Baltimore's Farmers Market helping the Supplemental Nutrition Assistance Program by providing them with fresh vegetables and fruits

Fifteen states expressed interest in having the Healthy Incentives Pilot (HIP) program and, ultimately, five states submitted applications to be considered for HIP. Hampden County, Massachusetts was selected as the Healthy Incentives Pilot site. HIP operated between November 2011 and December 2012. The Massachusetts Department of Transitional Assistance (DTA) was the state agency responsible for SNAP. DTA recruited retailers to take part in HIP and sell more produce, planned for the EBT system change with the state EBT vendor, and hired six new staff members dedicated to HIP. DTA provided FNS with monthly reports, data collection and evaluation.

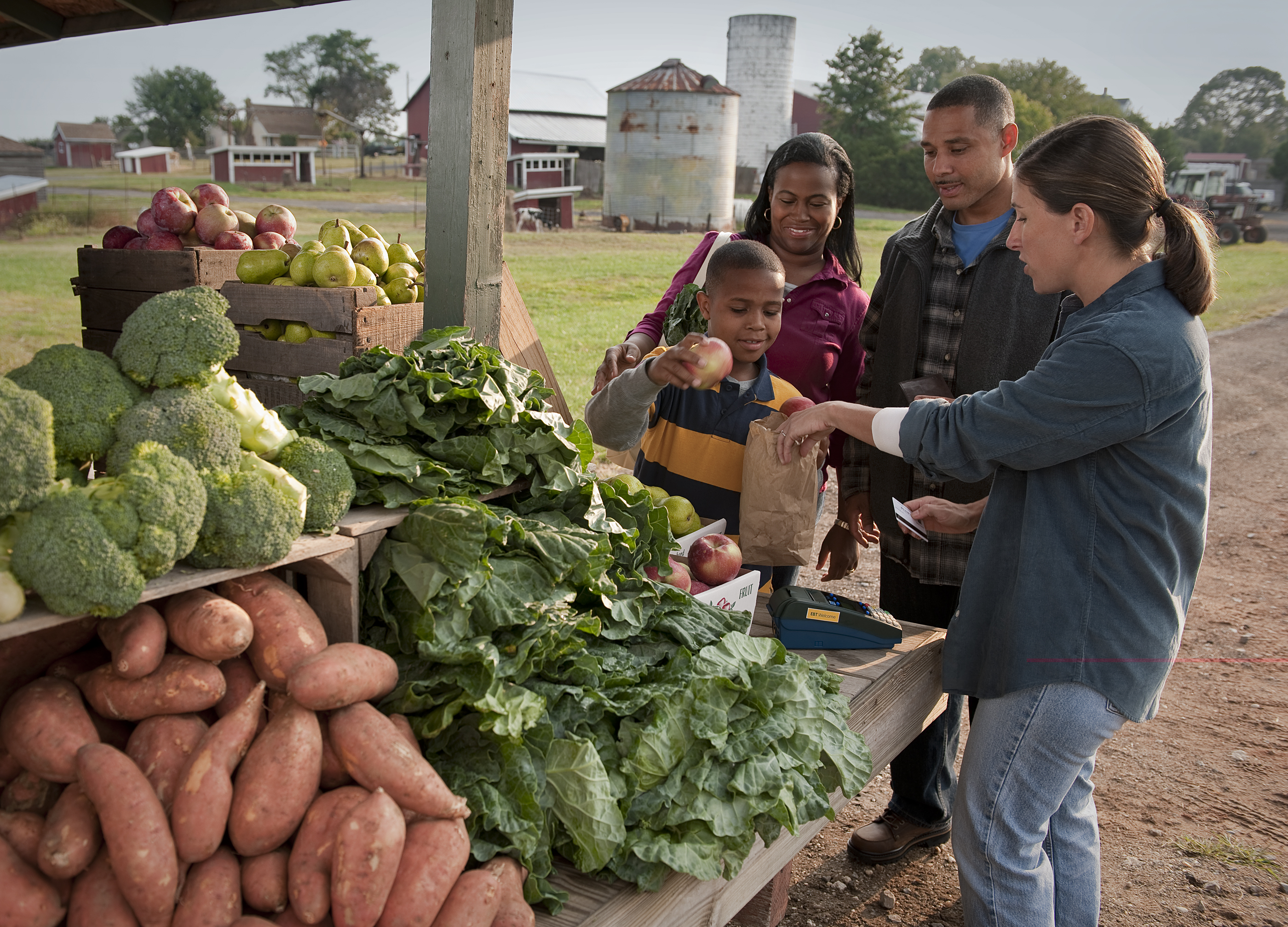
USDA is working to expand access to farmers' markets for those participating in the Supplemental Nutrition Assistance Program (SNAP).

HIP offered select SNAP recipients a 30% subsidy on produce, which was credited to the participant's EBT card. Out of approximately 55,000 SNAP households in Hampden County, 7,500 households participated in HIP. Under HIP, produce is defined as fresh, frozen, canned, or dried fruits and vegetables that do not have any added sugar, salt, fat, or oil.

On average, people in the HIP program ate about a quarter cup (26 percent) more fruits and vegetables per day than SNAP recipients who did not receive the incentives. HIP participants were more likely to have fruits and vegetables available at home during the pilot. If the program were implemented nationwide, the estimated cost would be approximately $90 million over five years.

=== Restrictions on "junk food" or "luxury items" ===
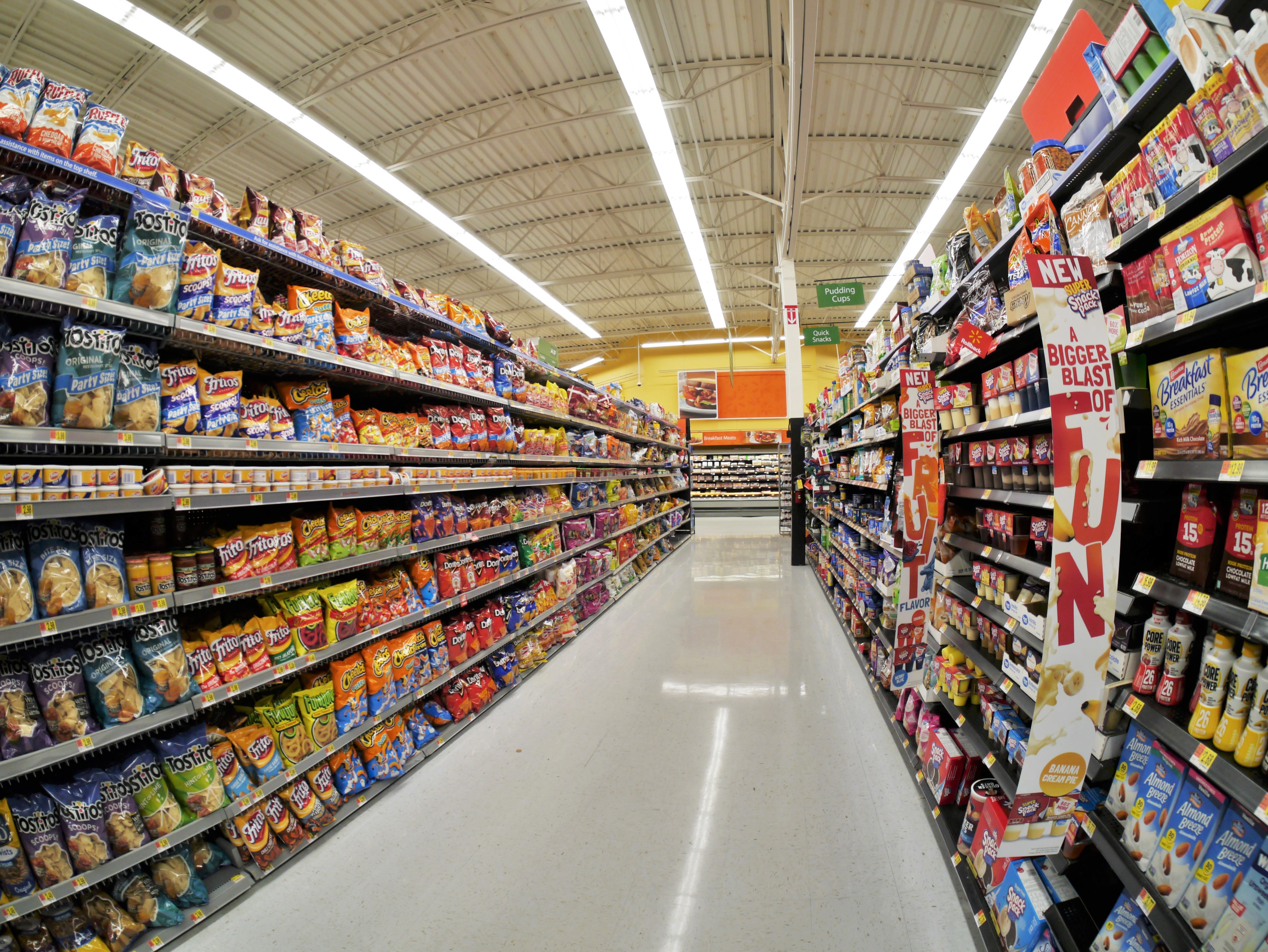
Chips and other snack foods at a Walmart

Beginning January 1, 2026, Indiana, Iowa, Nebraska, Utah and West Virginia will not allow certain foods like soda or candy to be purchased with SNAP funds. For two decades, Congress and the Department of Agriculture, citing grounds of administrative burden and personal freedom, would not let states prohibit the purchase of so-called "junk food" or "luxury items" with SNAP funds. However, under the second Trump presidency, the federal government began granting waivers to states to make these restrictions.

==== History ====
The Food and Nutrition Service noted in 2007 that no federal standards exist to determine which foods should be considered "healthy" or not, that "vegetables, fruits, grain products, meat and meat alternatives account for nearly three-quarters of the money value of food used by food stamp households" and that "food stamp recipients are no more likely to consume soft drinks than are higher-income individuals, and are less likely to consume sweets and salty snacks."

Thomas Farley and Russell Sykes argued that the USDA should reconsider the possibility of restricting "junk food" purchases with SNAP in order to encourage healthy eating, along with incentivizing the purchase of healthy items through a credit or rebate program that makes foods such as fresh vegetables and meats cheaper. They also noted that many urban food stores do a poor job of stocking healthy foods and instead favor high-profit processed items.

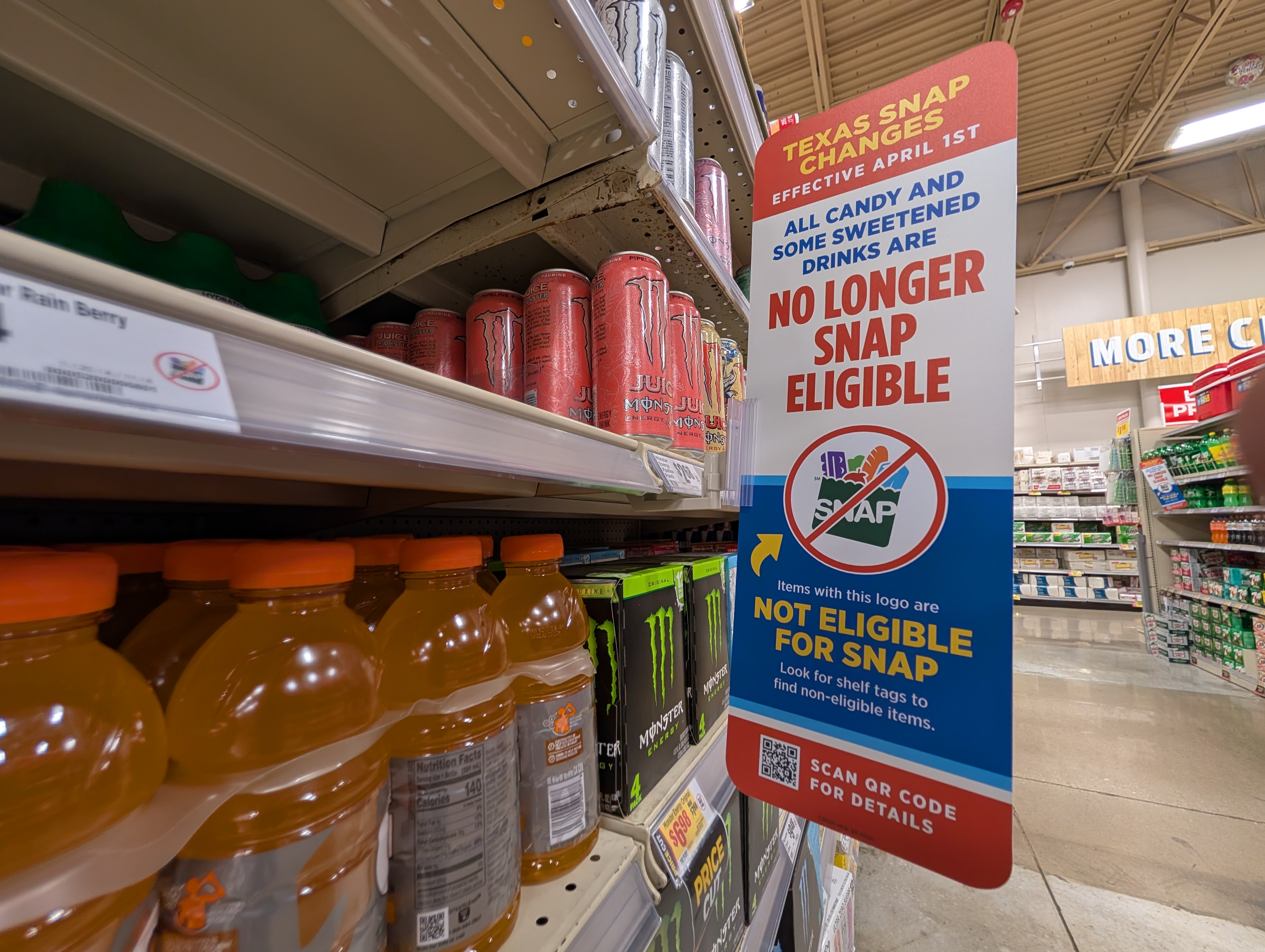
Sign on a shelf inside an H-E-B store indicating restrictions on beverages and candy

Some data suggests that it would benefit public health by making sugar-sweetened beverages ineligible to purchase with SNAP benefits. SNAP households use about 10% of their food budgets on sugar-sweetened beverages. Removing eligibility for sugar-sweetened beverages could result in a 2.4% reduction in obesity prevalence, 1.7% reduction in type II diabetes prevalence, and elimination of 52,000 deaths from stroke and heart attack over the course of ten years. The soda and broader food industries have received criticism for lobbying against reforms that would exclude "junk food" including soda from purchase with SNAP funds. A restriction on sugary beverages took effect in Texas in 2026.

== See also ==
- Department of Agriculture v. Moreno, 413 U.S. 528 (1973)
- Food, Conservation, and Energy Act of 2008 (2008 Farm Bill)
- Food stamp challenge
- Lone Star Card (Texas Electronic Benefit Transfer)
- Lyng v. Castillo, 477 U.S. 635 (1986)
- National School Lunch Act
- Special Supplemental Nutrition Program for Women, Infants and Children (WIC)

General:

- Food policy
- Hunger in the United States
- Social programs in the United States
- Social safety net

== General sources ==
- Eisinger, Peter K. Toward an end to hunger in America. Washington: The Brookings Institution, 1998.
- Gundersen, Craig; LeBlanc, Michael; Kuhn, Betsey, "The Changing Food Assistance Landscape: The Food Stamp Program in a Post-Welfare Reform Environment, United States Department of Agriculture, Agricultural Economics Report No. (AER773) 36 pp, March 1999
- MacDonald, Maurice. Food, Stamps, and Income Maintenance. New York: Academic Pres, Inc, 1977.
- United States Department of Health and Human Services, "2002 Indicators of Welfare Dependence Appendix A: Program Data: Food Stamp Program"
  - Article based on the USDA Web publication: A Short History of the Food Stamp Program

Attribution
