= Lyng v. Castillo =

- Supreme Court of the United States

Argued April 29, 1986 Decided June 27, 1986
- Full case name: Lyng, Secretary of Agriculture v. Castillo et al.
- Citations: 477 U.S. 635 (more) 106 S. Ct. 2727; 91 L. Ed. 2d 527; 1986 U.S. LEXIS 72

Case history
- Prior: Appeal from the United States District Court for the Southern District of Texas

Holding
- The statutory definition of "household" did not violate the appellee's rights to due process.

Court membership
- Chief Justice Warren E. Burger Associate Justices William J. Brennan Jr. · Byron White; Thurgood Marshall · Harry Blackmun; Lewis F. Powell Jr. · William Rehnquist; John P. Stevens · Sandra Day O'Connor

Case opinions
- Majority: Stevens, joined by Burger, Blackmun, Powell, Rehnquist, O'Connor
- Dissent: Brennan
- Dissent: White
- Dissent: Marshall

Laws applied
- U.S. Const. amend. V

Lyng v. Castillo, 477 U.S. 635 (1986), reversed a lower court's decision that the change in the statutory definition of a household violated the appellee's due process rights. The program rules for food stamps were changed in 1981 and 1982 which changed the definitions of households. The Supreme Court of the United States ruled that the District Court erred in using heightened scrutiny to analyze the validity of the household definition.

Earlier, the Supreme Court ruled in Department of Agriculture v. Moreno (1973) that a provision of the Food Stamp Act of 1971 was unconstitutional because a household, if an unrelated individual lived in it, would have its benefits reduced or eliminated.

== Background ==
Eligibility for the federal food stamp program is determined on a household basis. However, the exact definition of the term "household" fluctuates and may not include all people living on the same property. Distant family members (farther than first cousin), tenants, subleasers, non-legally related minors, and non-married spouses are excluded.

The plaintiffs argued that some or all of the groups should be included in proposals for eligibility and quantity of aid supplied. The disputed section is as follows:

"Household" means (1) an individual who lives alone or who, while living with others, customarily purchases foods and prepares meals for home consumption separate and apart from the others, or (2) a group of individuals who live together and customarily purchase food and prepare meals together for home consumption; except that parents and children, or siblings, who live together shall be treated as a group of individuals who customarily purchase and prepare meals together for home consumption even if they do not do so, unless one of the parents, or siblings, is an elderly or disabled member.

== Majority opinion ==
Justice Stevens, writing for the Court, ruled that since it was possible for those excluded from the household to petition for the federal food stamp program separately, they would not be considered in federal food stamp applications.

Eligibility and benefit levels in the federal food stamp program are determined on a household, rather than an individual, basis. The statutory definition of the term "household," as amended in 1981 and 1982, generally treats parents, children and siblings who live together as a single household, but it does not treat more distant relatives or groups of unrelated persons who live together as a single household unless they also customarily purchase food and prepare meals together.

Although there are variations in the facts of the four cases that were consolidated in the District Court, they all raise the question whether the statutory distinction between parents, children, and siblings and all other groups of individuals violates the guarantee of equal treatment in the Due Process Clause of the Fifth Amendment.

== Dissents ==
Justices Brennan, White, and Marshall all authored dissenting opinions.

=== Brennan's dissent ===
Justice Brennan said he "would affirm on the ground that the challenged classifications violate the Equal Protection Clause because they fail the rational basis test."

=== Marshall's dissent ===
Justice Marshall argued:

This case demonstrates yet again the lack of vitality in this Court's recent equal protection jurisprudence. When it moved beyond the rule that merely grouped parents and children, and, in the 1982 amendments, grouped siblings together as well, Congress interfered substantially with the desires of demonstrably separate families to remain separate families. It did so, moreover, while recognizing that distinct families living together often are genuinely separate households, and that the food stamp program should permit separate families that are not related to live together, but maintain separate households. ... Congress nevertheless assumed that related families are less likely to be genuinely separate households than are unrelated families, and failed even to provide related families a chance to rebut the legislative presumption. In view of the importance to the affected families of their family life and their very survival, the Court's extreme deference to this untested assumption is simply inappropriate. I respectfully dissent.

=== White's dissent ===
Justice White agreed with the last three paragraphs of Justice Marshall's dissenting opinion, saying that "the classification at issue in this case is irrational."

== See also ==
- List of United States Supreme Court cases, volume 477
- List of United States Supreme Court cases
- Lists of United States Supreme Court cases by volume
- List of United States Supreme Court cases by the Rehnquist Court
