= Piute Range =

Mountain range in California and Nevada, US

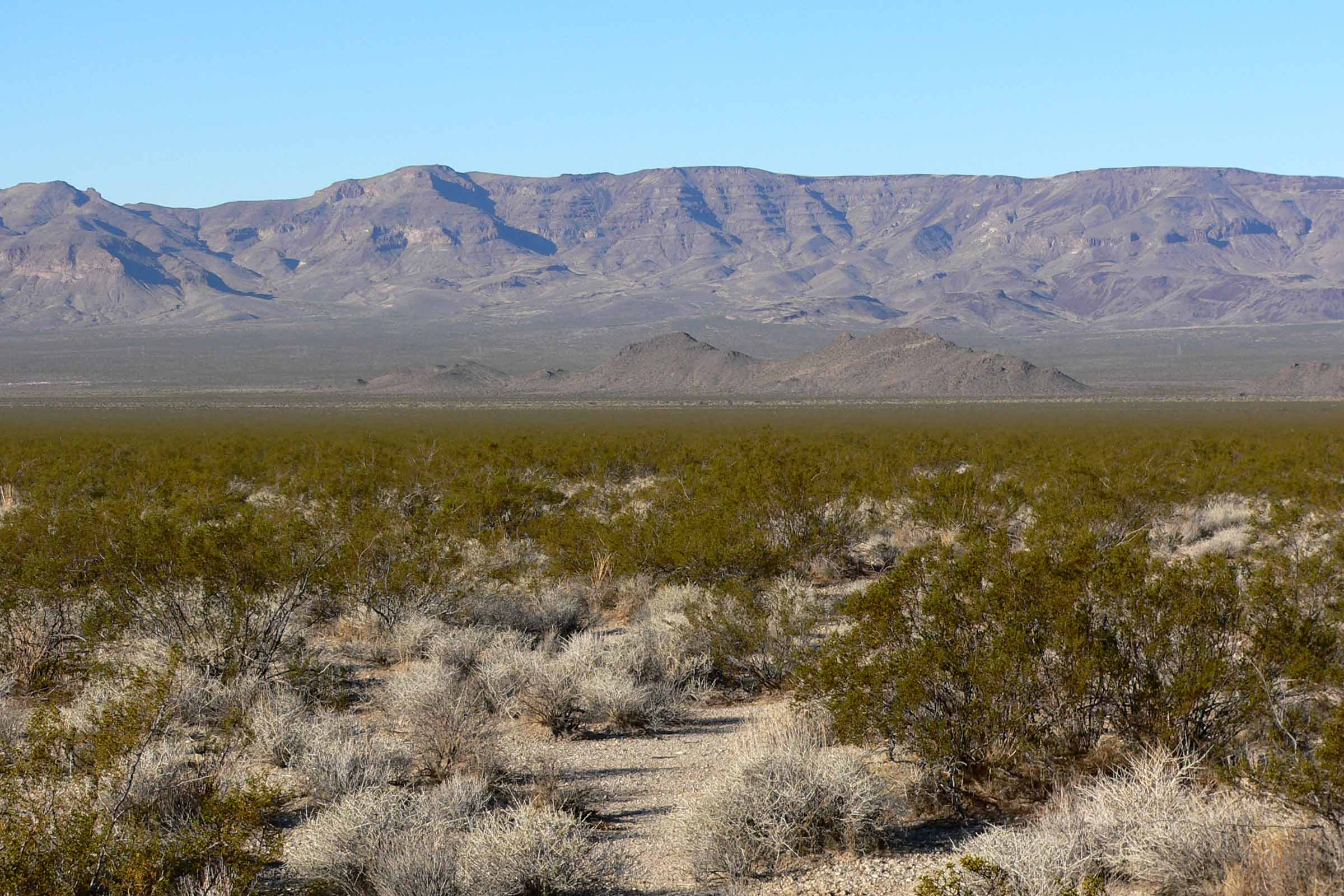
- Western flank View due west from Piute Valley

Highest point
- Elevation: 4,908 ft (1,496 m)
- Coordinates: 35°12′54″N 115°0′18″W

Dimensions
- Length: 20 mi (32 km) N-S

Geography
- Location within California
- Country: United States
- States: Nevada; California
- Regions: Mojave National Preserve; Mojave Desert)
- Counties: San Bernardino (CA); Clark (NV)
- Borders on: Lanfair Valley; Eldorado Valley; Piute Valley; Castle Mountains; New York Mountains; McCullough Range
- Topo map: USGS East of Grotto Hills

The Piute Range is located in the Mojave Desert, primarily in northeast San Bernardino County, California, United States, with a north portion in Nevada. Most of the range is the eastern border of the Mojave National Preserve, a National Park Service natural area and park.

== Geography ==
The mountains lie to the east of Lanfair Valley and southeast of the New York Mountains and Castle Mountains, and northeast of the Piute Mountains. They trend in a north-south direction, and form the western perimeter of the north-south Piute Valley which extends north past Cal-Nev-Ari to Searchlight.

== History ==
Fort Piute, one of a chain of military stations constructed to protect travellers on the Mojave Road from San Bernardino across the Mojave Desert to Fort Mojave on the Colorado River, lies at the southeastern end of the range near Piute Spring.

== 4-Valley water divide, endorheic Mohave National Preserve ==
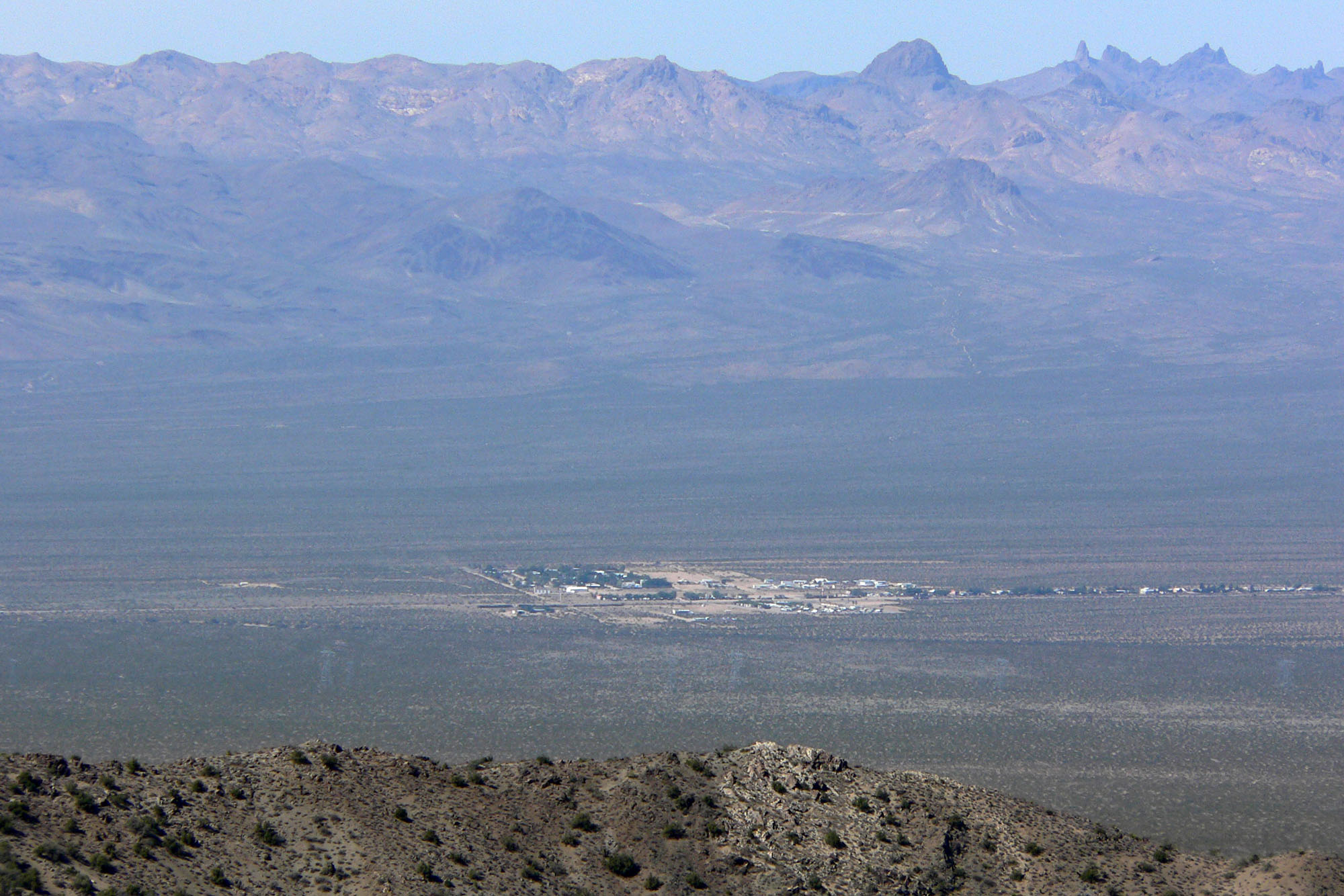
(north end)-Piute Range -(+ north Castle and New York Mtns) central-north Piute Valley, Cal-Nev-Ari, Nevada (the north mountain ranges and valleys water divide point is at right in the distance – (the spires on the right, 3rd range, are the Castle Peaks of the New York Mountains)) View from Spirit Mountain

The southern end of the extensive McCullough Range converges with four valleys and three mountain ranges at a water divide point. West of the McCullough's lie the endorheic Roach and Ivanpah Dry Lakes of Ivanpah Valley; the valley extends north into Las Vegas' southwest, a tributary to the Las Vegas Wash. Ivanpah Valley turns southeast to meet the water divide point. Northeast of the water divide point is the southwest Eldorado Valley, also endorheic with its Eldorado Dry Lake. Southwest, the Piute Valley drains south, then Piute Wash turns east and descends steeply at the Dead Mountains to its outfall at the Colorado River and Needles.

The Mojave National Preserve is mostly endorheic with the west bordering on Baker, California and the twin dry lakes of Silver Dry Lake and Soda Dry Lake. The northeast preserve corner is anchored by the water divide point. The northeast borders of the New York and smaller Castle Mountains meet the north of the Piute Range; to the west of the Piute's, east of the New York Mountains is the southerly draining endorheic Lanfair Valley.

The Piute Valley Watershed is the first major watershed southeast of Las Vegas to drain into the western side of the south-flowing Colorado River.
