= Castle Mountains National Monument =

Protected area in Mojave Desert, California

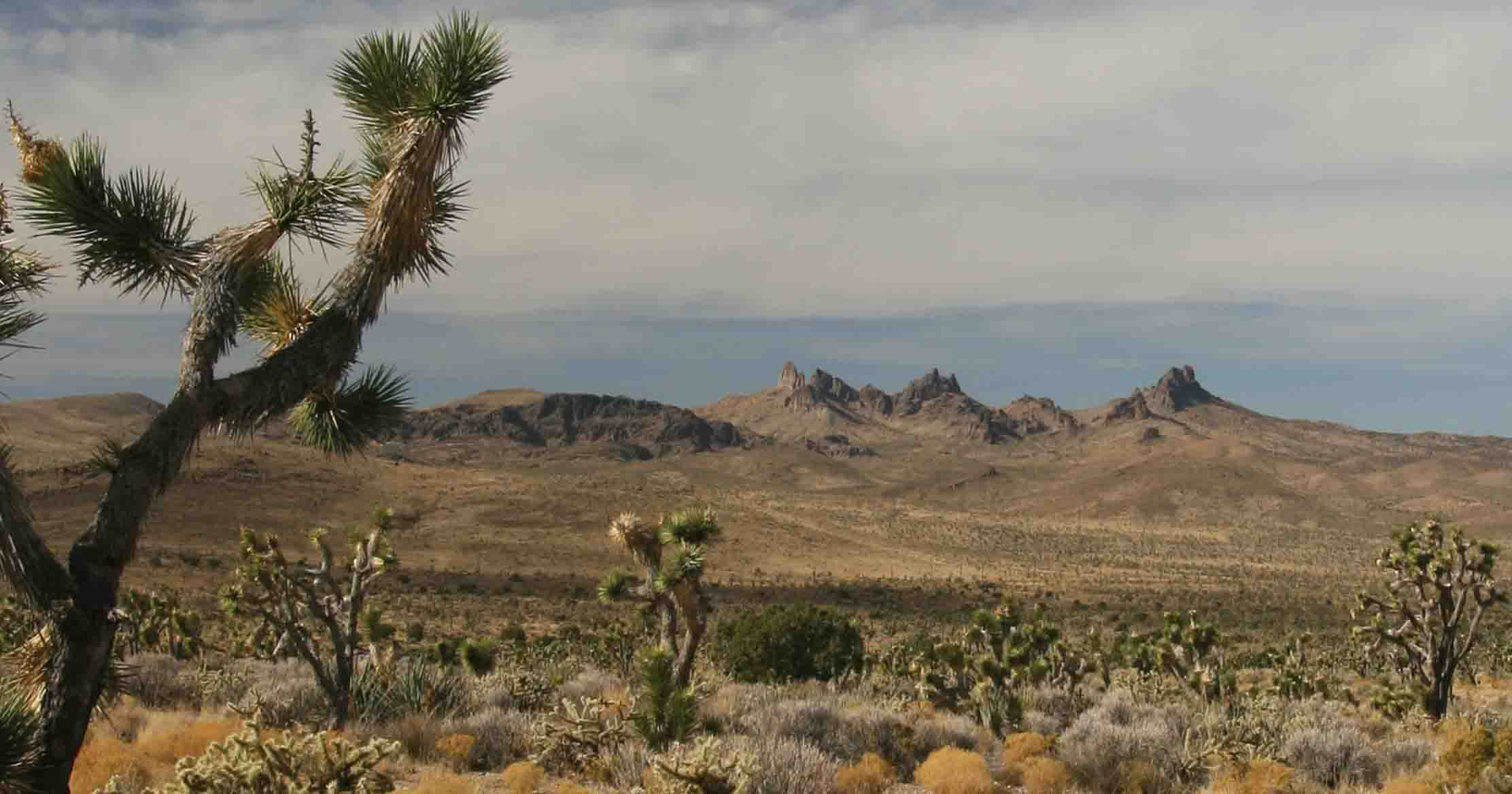
- Castle Peaks (Mojave National Preserve) as seen from Castle Mountains National Monument

- Location within southern California Location within California Location within the United States
- Interactive map of Castle Mountains National Monument
- Location: San Bernardino County, California
- Coordinates: 35°15′N 115°07′W
- Area: 20,920 acres (8,470 ha)
- Authorized: February 12, 2016
- Governing body: National Park Service
- Website: Castle Mountains National Monument

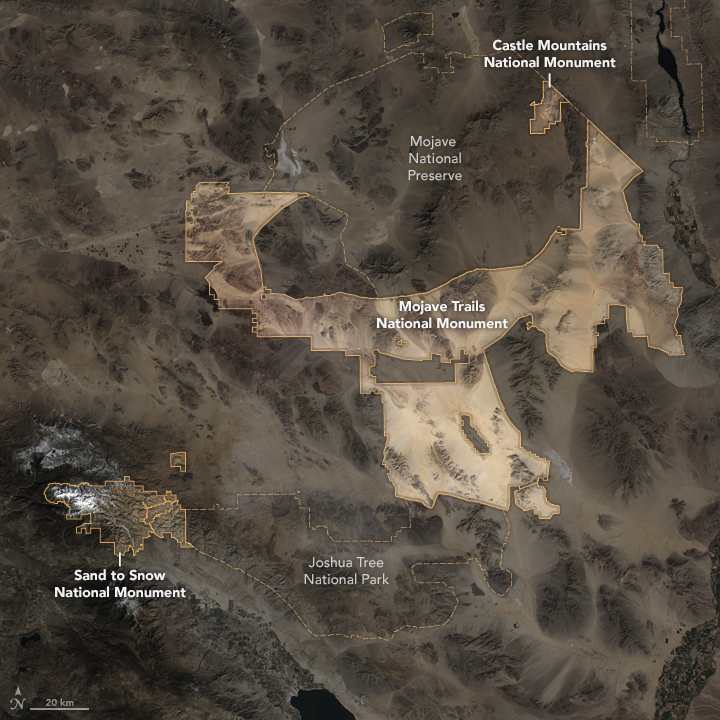
Castle Mountains NM and other newly declared National Monuments, 2016

Castle Mountains National Monument is a U.S. National Monument located in the eastern Mojave Desert and northeastern San Bernardino County, in the state of California.

The park protects 20,920 acres, located between the interstates I−15 and I−40, and northwest of the Colorado River.

== Geography ==
The national monument protects a section of the Castle Mountains, a range located in San Bernardino County and Clark County, Nevada. The range lies south and east of the New York Mountains, southwest of Searchlight and west of Cal-Nev-Ari, Nevada. The range lies at the northeastern end of Lanfair Valley and reaches 5,543 feet (1,690 m) in elevation at the summit of Hart Peak and 5580 ft at Linder Peak. The mountains lie in a southwest-northeasterly direction. The Piute Range lies to the southeast.

Castle Mountains National Monument is surrounded on three sides by the Mojave National Preserve, managed by the National Park Service.

It surrounds the Castle Mountain Mine Area, an open pit gold mine in the southern Castle Mountains owned by Canadian NewCastle Gold Ltd., who can excavate nearly 10 million tons of ore through 2025, though due to low gold prices mining has been suspended since 2001. The national monument proclamation states that after any such mining and reclamation are completed, or after 10 years if no mining occurs, the Federal land in the 8,340 acre Castle Mountain Mine Area is to be transferred to the National Park Service.

== Designation and management ==
It was designated by President Obama on February 12, 2016, along with Mojave Trails National Monument and Sand to Snow National Monument also in Southern California. Of the three it is the only one to be managed by the National Park Service, with the other two being placed under the control of the Bureau of Land Management and/or the United States Forest Service.

== See also ==
- List of national monuments of the United States
- Natural history of the Mojave Desert
- Protected areas of the Mojave Desert
  - Mojave National Preserve topics
