= Piute Spring =

Coordinates: 35°06′45″N 114°59′49″W

Piute Spring is a spring in a canyon in the Piute Range of San Bernardino County, California. It lies an elevation 3,025 feet / 922 meters at the head of Piute Creek. Piute Creek runs from Piute Spring down a canyon through the Piute Range east then northeast downstream to where its waters sink into the sands of a wash near the ruins of Fort Piute. From there that wash turns east widening into an alluvial fan of braided washes that terminate in Piute Wash in the middle of Piute Valley.
