= Piute Valley =

Valley in the United States

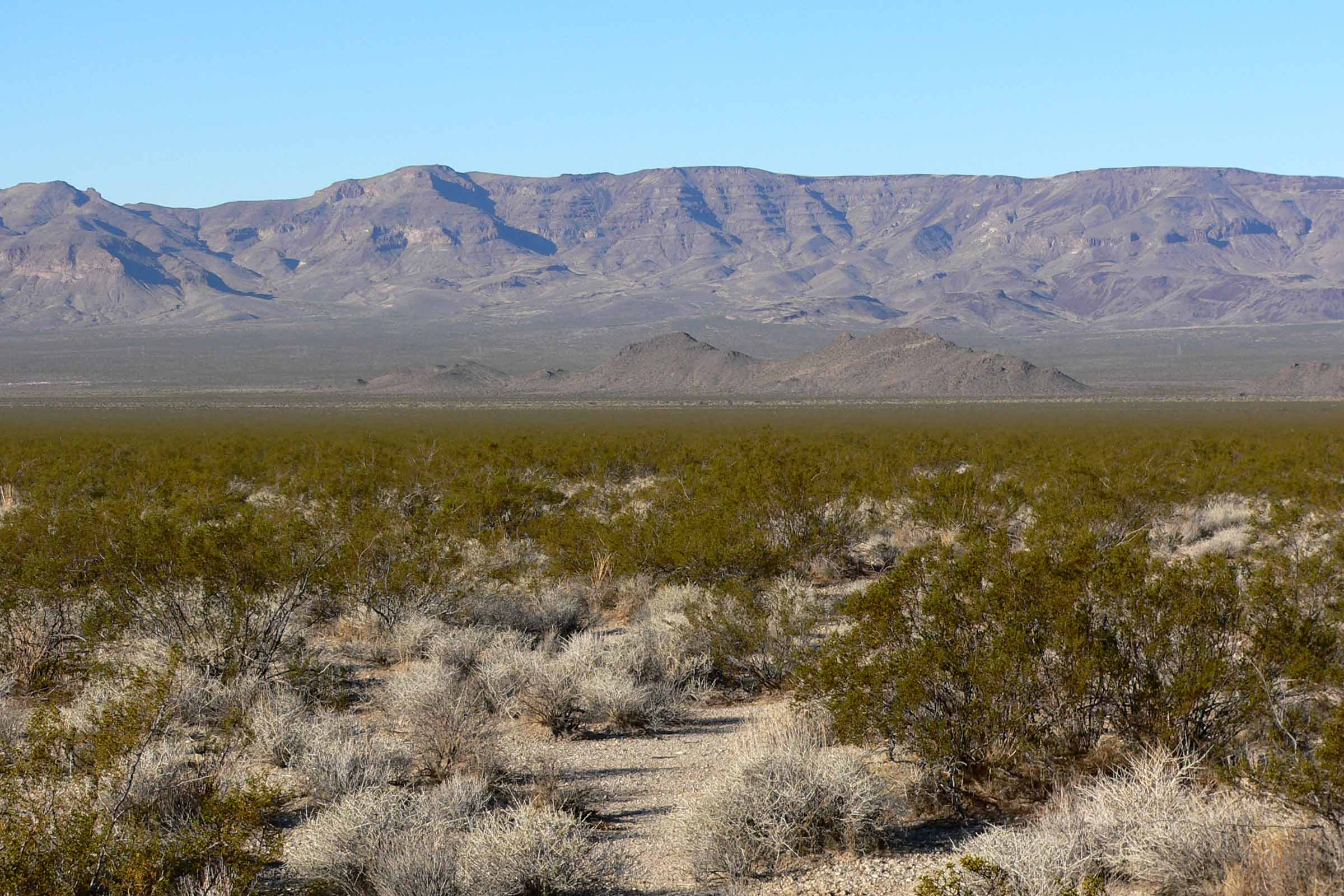
- View west over the middle Piute Valley, Piute Range in distance

- Location within California
- Length: 45 mi (72 km) N-S
- Width: 10 mi (16 km) E-W

Geography
- Country: United States
- States: Nevada; California
- Regions: Mojave Desert; Mojave National Preserve; Lower Colorado River Valley
- Districts: Clark County, NV; San Bernardino County, CA
- Population centers: Cal-Nev-Ari, NV; Searchlight, NV
- Borders on: Piute Range; Newberry Mountains (Nevada); Dead Mountains; Interstate 40 in California
- Coordinates: 35°18′12″N 114°52′51″W
- River: Piute Wash
- Interactive map of Piute Valley

The Piute Valley is a 45-mile-long (72 km) north–south valley southeast of Las Vegas, Nevada, and northwest of Needles. The north of the valley is at Searchlight, with some of the valley extending northwest from Searchlight. At the center-north lies Cal-Nev-Ari, Nevada.

The second valley southeast of Las Vegas borders to the north, the endorheic Eldorado Valley, with its dry lake. The next watershed north is the Las Vegas Wash Watershed.

The northeast portion of the Mojave National Preserve makes up the northwestern region of the Piute Valley, at a four-valley water divide point.

The Piute Valley Watershed is the first watershed southeast of Las Vegas–Lake Mead to meet the Colorado River; the Piute Wash outfall with the Colorado River is in California at Needles. The mountain ranges south of Lake Mead, bordering the river and Lake Mohave are part of the Havasu-Mohave Lakes Watershed.

== Piute Valley description ==
Piute Valley is a 45-mile-long (72 km) valley, and about 10 miles (16 km) wide at its southern end. It is drained by Piute Wash with the wash turning easterly at the south to join the Colorado River at Needles. The valley is bordered by three mountain ranges, all north–south ranges, with the Piute Range to the west. To the northeast is the Newberry Mountains, and to the southeast is the Dead Mountains range, where Piute Wash borders its southwest and south perimeter.

Searchlight is at the north of the valley, with a 5-mile (8.0 km) grade of U.S. Route 95 in Nevada north of Searchlight to the beginning of the Eldorado Valley. U.S. 95 is the route traversing the Piute Valley north–south, connecting at the south to the east–west Interstate 40 in California and the northern foothills of the Sacramento Mountains.

== 4-Valley water divide, endorheic Mohave National Preserve ==
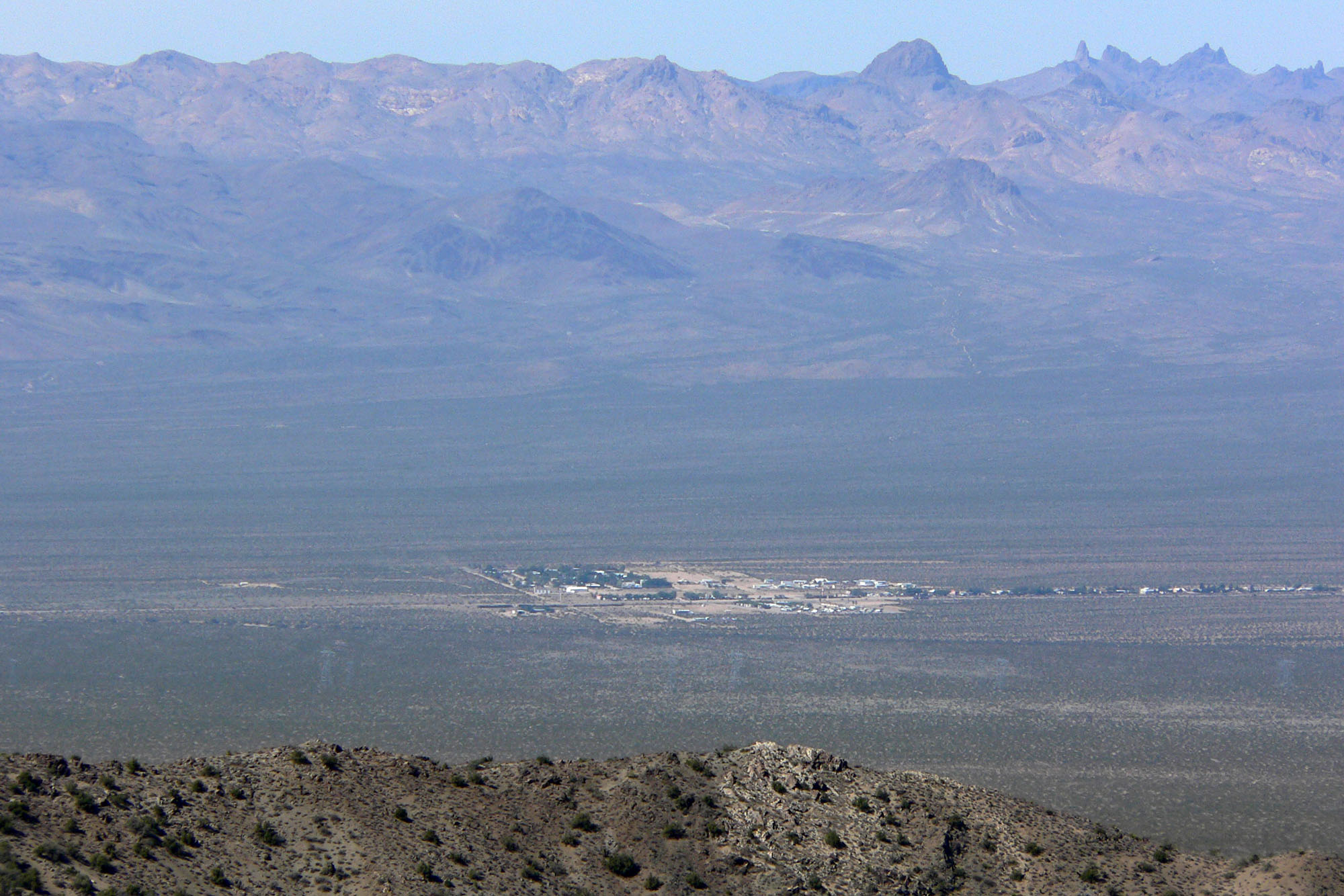
Central-northern Piute Valley, Cal-Nev-Ari, Nevada — the north mountain ranges and valleys water divide point is at right in the distance — the spires on the right, 3rd range, are the Castle Peaks of the New York Mountains (View from Spirit Mountain)

The southern end of the extensive McCullough Range converges with four valleys and three mountain ranges. West of the McCullough's lie the endorheic Roach and Ivanpah Dry Lakes of Ivanpah Valley; the valley extends north into Las Vegas' southwest, a tributary to the Las Vegas Wash. Ivanpah Valley turns southeast to meet the water divide point. Northeast of the water divide point is the southwest Eldorado Valley, also endorheic with its Eldorado Dry Lake. Southwest the Piute Valley drains south, then Piute Wash turns east and descends steeply at the Dead Mountains to its outfall at the Colorado River and Needles.

The Mojave National Preserve is mostly endorheic with the west bordering on Baker, California, and the twin dry lakes of Silver Dry Lake and Soda Dry Lake. The northeast preserve corner is anchored by the water divide point. The northeast borders of the New York and smaller Castle Mountains meet the north of the Piute Range; to the west of the Piute's, east of the New York Mountains is the southerly draining endorheic Lanfair Valley.

The Piute Valley Watershed is the first major watershed southeast of Las Vegas to drain into the western side of the south-flowing Colorado River.

Though Piute Wash drains Piute Valley, the entire watershed includes Sacramento Wash (California) which covers an equivalent area west of the north–south Piute Range, and drains the Lanfair Valley and surrounding mountain ranges.
