= Sloan, Nevada =

Unincorporated community in Nevada, US

Sloan
- Unincorporated community
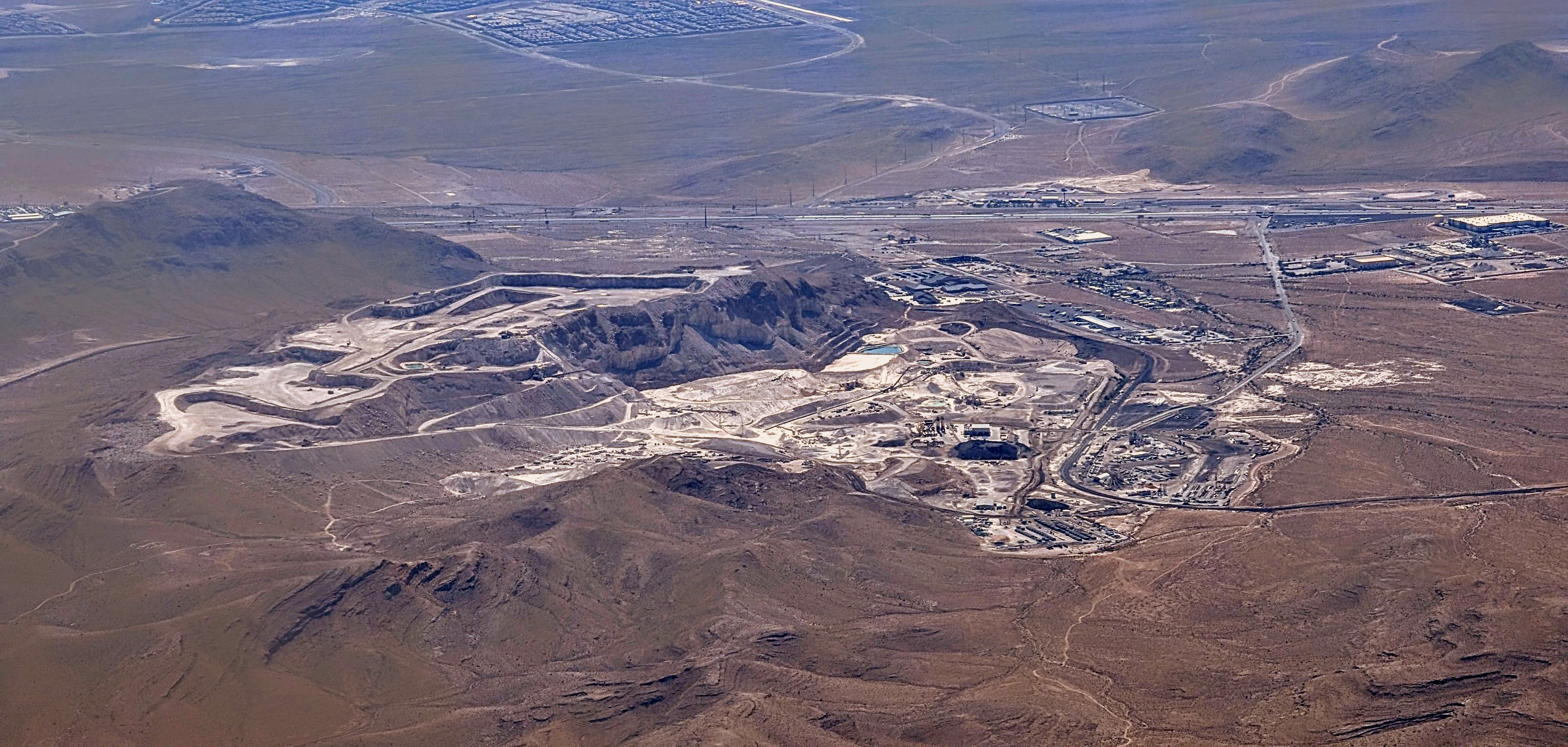
- Aerial view of Sloan in 2025

- Location within the state of Nevada
- Coordinates: 35°56′37″N 115°13′02″W
- Country: United States
- State: Nevada
- County: Clark
- Founded: 1912; 114 years ago

Population (2010)
  - Total: 105
- Time zone: UTC-8 (PST)
  - Summer (DST): UTC-7 (PDT)
- ZIP codes: 89054
- Area codes: 702 and 725

Sloan is an unincorporated community located in Clark County, Nevada, 18 miles (29 km) southwest of Las Vegas. The community has a population of 105 residents, as per the 2010 U.S. census. Sloan is renowned for its canyon, petroglyphs, and the George W. Dunaway Army Reserve Center.

== History ==
Sloan was initially settled in 1912 as Ehret, its founder's family name. On September 11, 1922, the name of the community was changed to Sloan, named after the limestone dolomite carnotite found in the area.

== Geography ==
Sloan is situated in the North McCullough Wilderness Area and is adjacent to the McCullough Range. It is home to several hiking trails and the Sloan Canyon National Conservation Area, Petroglyph Canyon, and Black Mountain.

== Attractions ==
The Sloan Canyon Petroglyph Site is a National Register-listed property located within the Sloan Canyon National Conservation Area, which is a 48,438 acre conservation area in the eastern part of Sloan. It contains more than 1,700 individual design elements that dates back to Archaic times. It also contains geological features such as volcanic rock peaks.

Its petroglyphs dates thousands of years back and includes carvings and paintings by Indian peoples such as the Ancestral Puebloans, Patayan people, and Southern Paiute people. It was designated a National Conservation Area by the U.S. Congress in 2002, through the passing of the H.R. 5200 - Clark County Conservation of Public Land and Natural Resources Act of 2002.

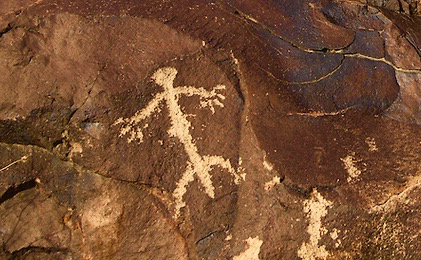

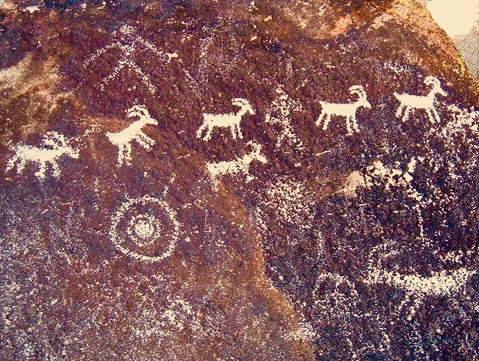

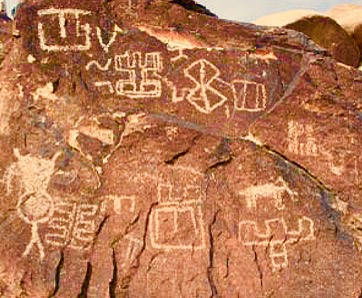

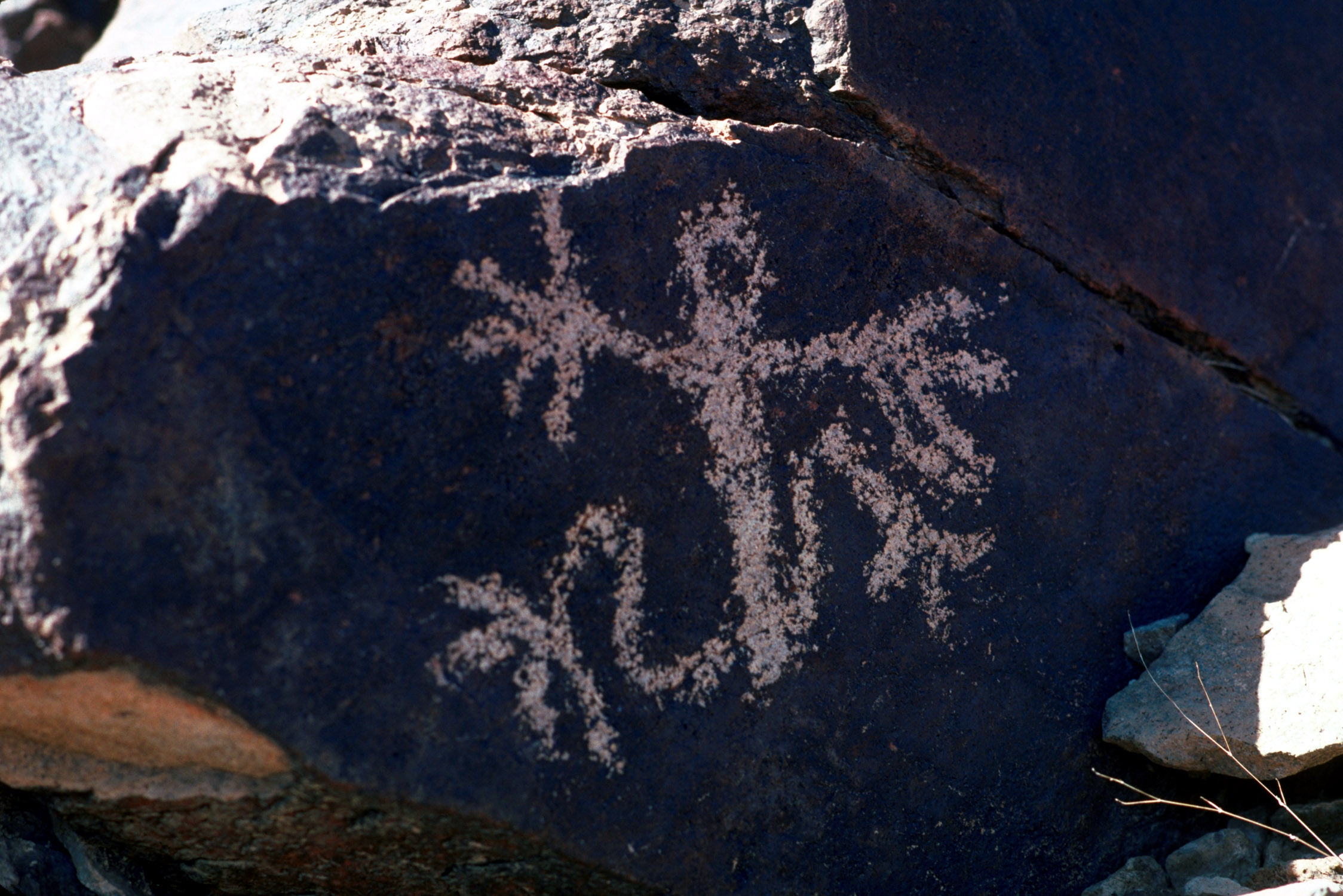

The George W. Dunaway Army Reserve Center, which is not open to the public, officially opened in April 2015.

== Access ==
Sloan is adjacent to Interstate 15 and can be accessed via exit 25. There are no bus routes from Las Vegas to Sloan. The Sloan Canyon visitors center and trailhead to the petroglyphs are accessible from a newer paved road through the Henderson neighborhood of Anthem, east of Interstate 15.

== In popular culture ==
Sloan appears as a small miner's camp in the 2010 videogame Fallout: New Vegas.
