= Hart, California =

Hart
- Ghost town
- Location within the state of California Hart (the United States)
- Coordinates: 35°17′20″N 115°6′12″W
- Country: United States
- State: California
- County: San Bernardino
- National Park Service: Castle Mountains National Monument
- Time zone: UTC-8 (Pacific (PST))
  - Summer (DST): UTC-7 (PDT)
- GNIS feature ID: 1660728

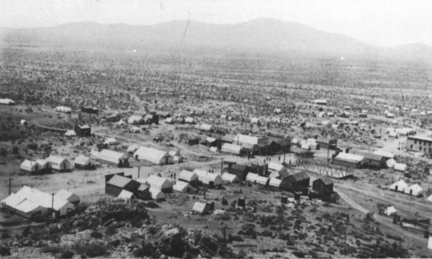
View of Hart in 1908, looking northwest

The Northern Club, downtown Hart in 1908

Hart was a short-lived gold mining town located in the Mojave Desert, in San Bernardino County, California. It existed between 1908 and 1915, and was located on the northeastern edge of Lanfair Valley near the New York Mountains. The area is now in the Castle Mountains National Monument, administered by the National Park Service.

== History ==
In late 1907, while a depression gripped the nation, three prospectors from Goldfield – James Hart and the brothers Bert and Clark Hitt – found pockets of rich gold ore in the Castle Mountains, approximately four miles south of the Barnwell & Searchlight Railroad.

The strike was touted as the "Second Goldfield bonanza". In early 1908, prospectors swarmed to the strike. During the next few months, 700 people arrived, a camp was established, a telephone line was strung to Barnwell, the weekly newspaper Enterprise started up, a voting precinct and justice-court township were created, and a post office were established.

By summer, Hart's 1,500 residents were served by the Norton House and Martin House Hotels, and the Star rooming house (flophouse). Other businesses included two general stores, (including the Hart-Gosney), the Ames Book and Cigar Store, a real-estate office, a candy store, two lumberyards, a bakery, eight saloons (including Hart and Hitt, C. Aguire, Arlington Club, Honest John, Oro Belle, and Northern Bar), and a brothel. There were telephone and telegraph services, and a water line.

A miners' union was organized. A businessmen's league limited the sale of liquor, enforced police and fire regulations, and ousted gamblers and toughs.

Hart and Hitt's original claim was sold by their promoter, Will Foster, to the Oro Belle Mining Company of Duluth, Minnesota in 1908 for $100,000. The mine was never profitable and shut down permanently in 1918.

All the other mines had the same fate. The pockets of high-grade ore proved small, and mining declined as soon as 1909. The largest mine besides the Oro Belle was the Big Chief, originally called the Jumbo, also owned by the Hart brothers. A 10 Stamp mill was built at this mine. Other mines included the Twin Peaks, the Flyer, the Florence, the Zinc-Graf property, and the Todd Hunter lease.

The Enterprise and other businesses closed. A fire wiped out much of the business district (largely deserted); the leading mines suspended work and the miners’ union was disbanded. The court district and voting precinct were abolished, and the post office closed in late 1915.

== See also ==
- Mojave Road
