= Mount Manchester =

Mountain in San Bernardino County, California, United States

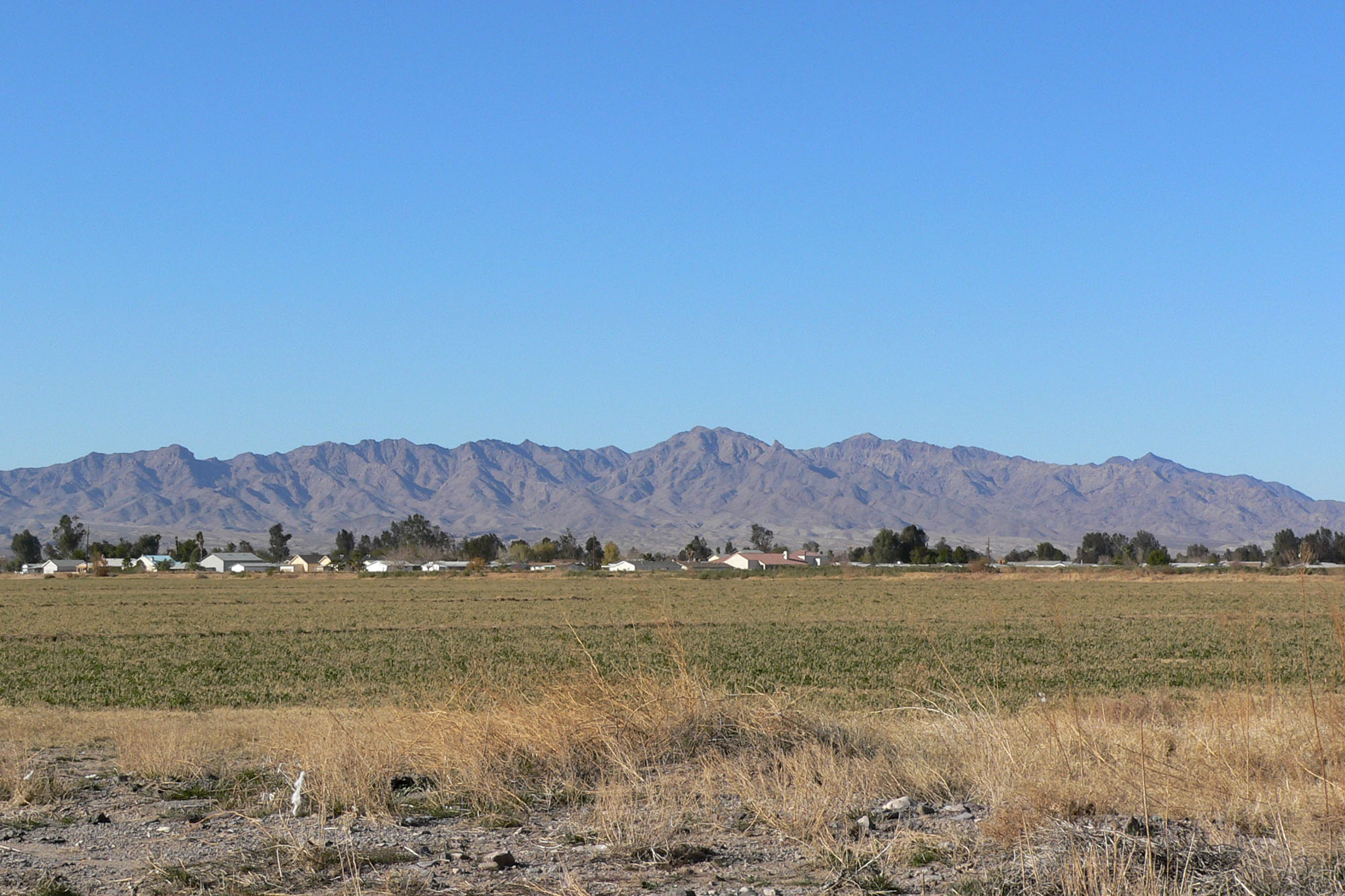
- View looking west (Dead Mountains trend S-N)

Highest point
- Elevation: 3,602 ft (1,098 m) NAVD 88
- Prominence: 1,287 ft (392 m)
- Coordinates: 35°01′40″N 114°44′56″W

Geography
- Location: San Bernardino County, California, U.S.
- Parent range: Dead Mountains

Climbing
- Easiest route: Hike

Mount Manchester is the highest peak in the Dead Mountains of extreme northeastern San Bernardino County, California, in the Mojave Desert.

== Dead Mountains wilderness ==
Mount Manchester is the highest point of the Bureau of Land Management wilderness area which comprises most of the Dead Mountains.

The Dead Mountains border the Colorado River on the east, and the Piute Wash of the Piute Valley on the west. Piute Wash drains south, then turns east for 8 miles (13 km) at the southern end of the mountain range to meet the Colorado River.

The Dead Mountains are located about 12 mi (19 km) north of Needles, California, just southwest of the Nevada state line. The closest communities to the wilderness area are Laughlin, Nevada, and Bullhead City and Fort Mohave, Arizona, located across the Colorado River to the east of the mountain range. The wilderness area can be accessed via unpaved roads west of Needles Highway, which connects Needles with Laughlin, Nevada and Nevada State Highway 163. More unpaved roads provide access to the Dead Mountains Wilderness from U.S. Highway 95, which runs north–south on the west side of the mountain range and connects Interstate 40 with the Las Vegas metropolitan area.

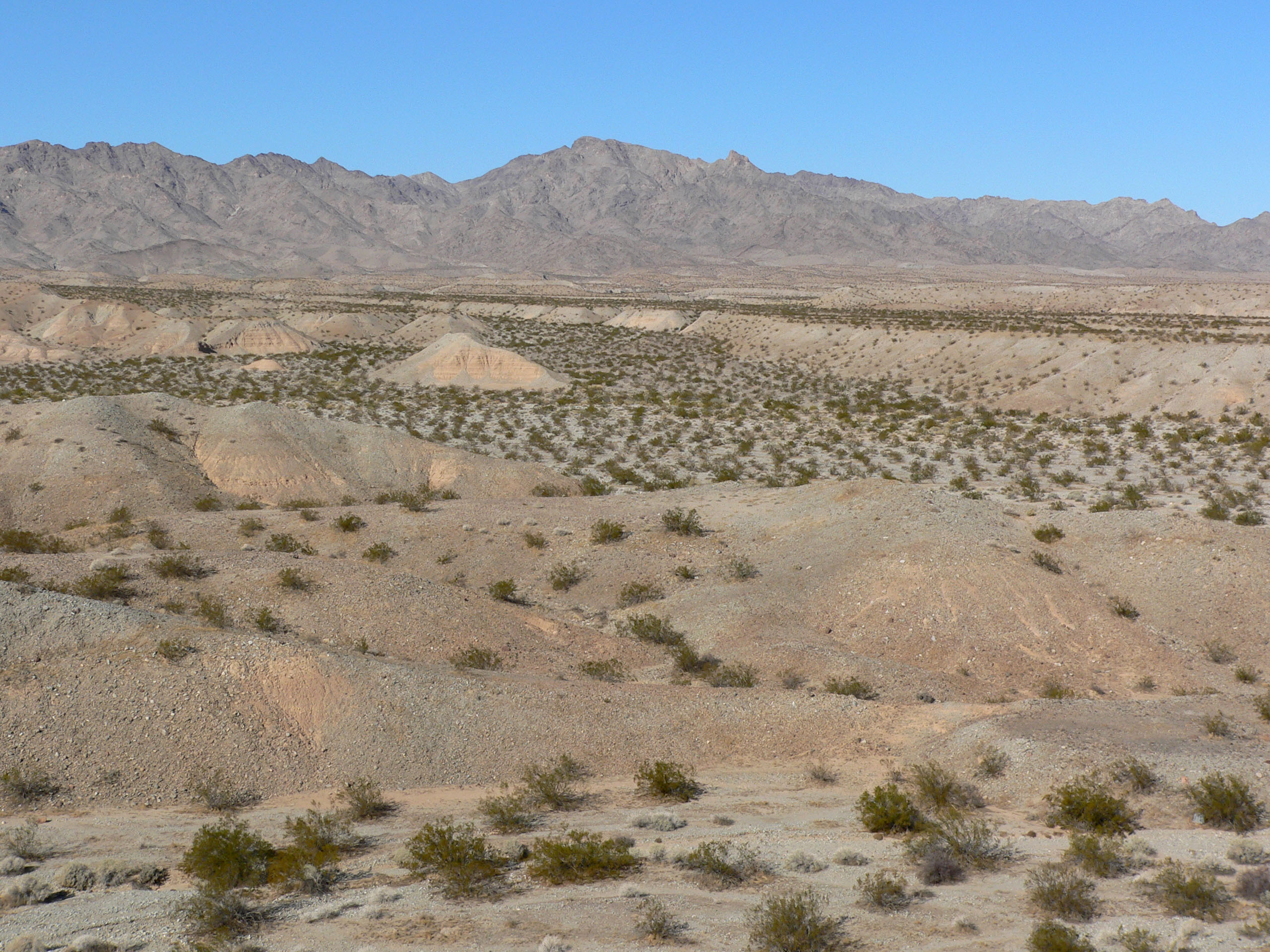
Mount Manchester, view from SE of Dead Mountains, at base of wash and alluvial fan-(4 mi NW of Needles)

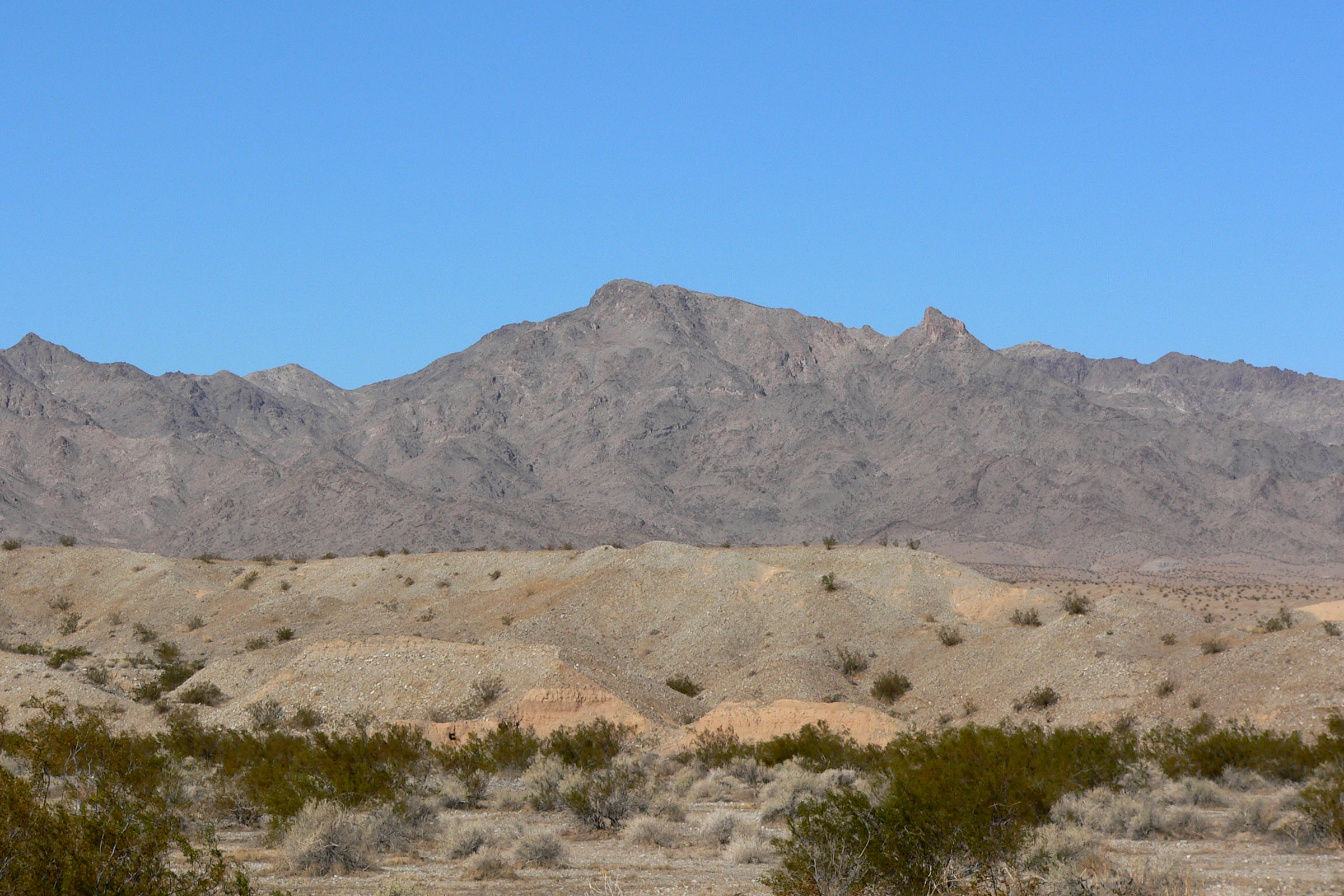
Closer view from SE (on River Road, (west bank of Colorado River)) (Pinnacle NE of Mount Manchester is identifier)

== See also ==
- Category: Protected areas of the Mojave Desert
