= Grotto Hills =

- Location within California Location within the United States

Highest point
- Elevation: 1,494 m (4,902 ft)

Geography
- Country: United States
- State: California
- Region: Mojave Desert
- District: San Bernardino County
- Range coordinates: 35°9′36.7″N 115°12′55.8″W
- Topo map: USGS Grotto Hills

Grotto Hills is a summit in the Lanfair Valley of San Bernardino County, California. Its tallest peak is at 4,895 feet / 1,492 meters. It is in the east-central part of Mojave National Preserve, 7 miles north of Hackberry Mountain.
