= Woods Mountains =

- Location within California

Highest point
- Elevation: 1,168 m (3,832 ft)

Geography
- Country: United States
- State: California
- District: San Bernardino County
- Range coordinates: 35°2′29.972″N 115°19′2.949″W
- Topo map: USGS Woods Mountains

The Woods Mountains are found in southeastern California in the Mojave Desert, at the southwestern end of the Lanfair Valley just east of Hole-in-the-Wall and west of Hackberry Mountain. The mountains are located in the Mojave National Preserve north of Interstate 40 and the Clipper Valley in San Bernardino County. The range reaches an elevation of 4,600 feet (1,400 m) at Tortoise Shell Mountain, which was named in 1971 by Stephen Castagneto due to fragments of shells found at the top from birds dropping tortoises to break their shells and feed on the inner meat. There are at least two overhangs that show fire scoring as evidence of the presence of pre-contact Chemehuevi Indians.
