= Ivanpah Valley =

Valley in California and Nevada

- Location within California

Geography
- Coordinates: 35°34′00″N 115°22′30″W
- Interactive map of Ivanpah Valley

The Ivanpah Valley is in southeastern California and southern Nevada in the United States. The valley is between the New York Mountains and the Ivanpah Mountains in San Bernardino County on the California side, and in Clark County on the Nevada side. The communities of Cima, California; Nipton, California; Jean, Nevada; and Primm, Nevada are in the valley. The Ivanpah Dry Lake, a popular place for land sailing, and the site of the proposed Southern Nevada Supplemental Airport also lie in the valley.

The headwaters of the valley lie in the south and southeast in the north of the Mojave National Preserve; the southeast of the valley is a water divide point at the south of the McCullough Range, with four valleys, and four mountain ranges. (The Piute Valley drains southeast into the Colorado River; the Eldorado Valley northeast is endorheic.)

The Ivanpah valley is featured in the 2010 video game Fallout: New Vegas.

== See also ==
- Ivanpah Solar Power Facility
- Ivanpah Valley Airport
- Lanfair Valley
- Piute Valley
