= Castle Mountains (California) =

Mountain range in California and Nevada, US

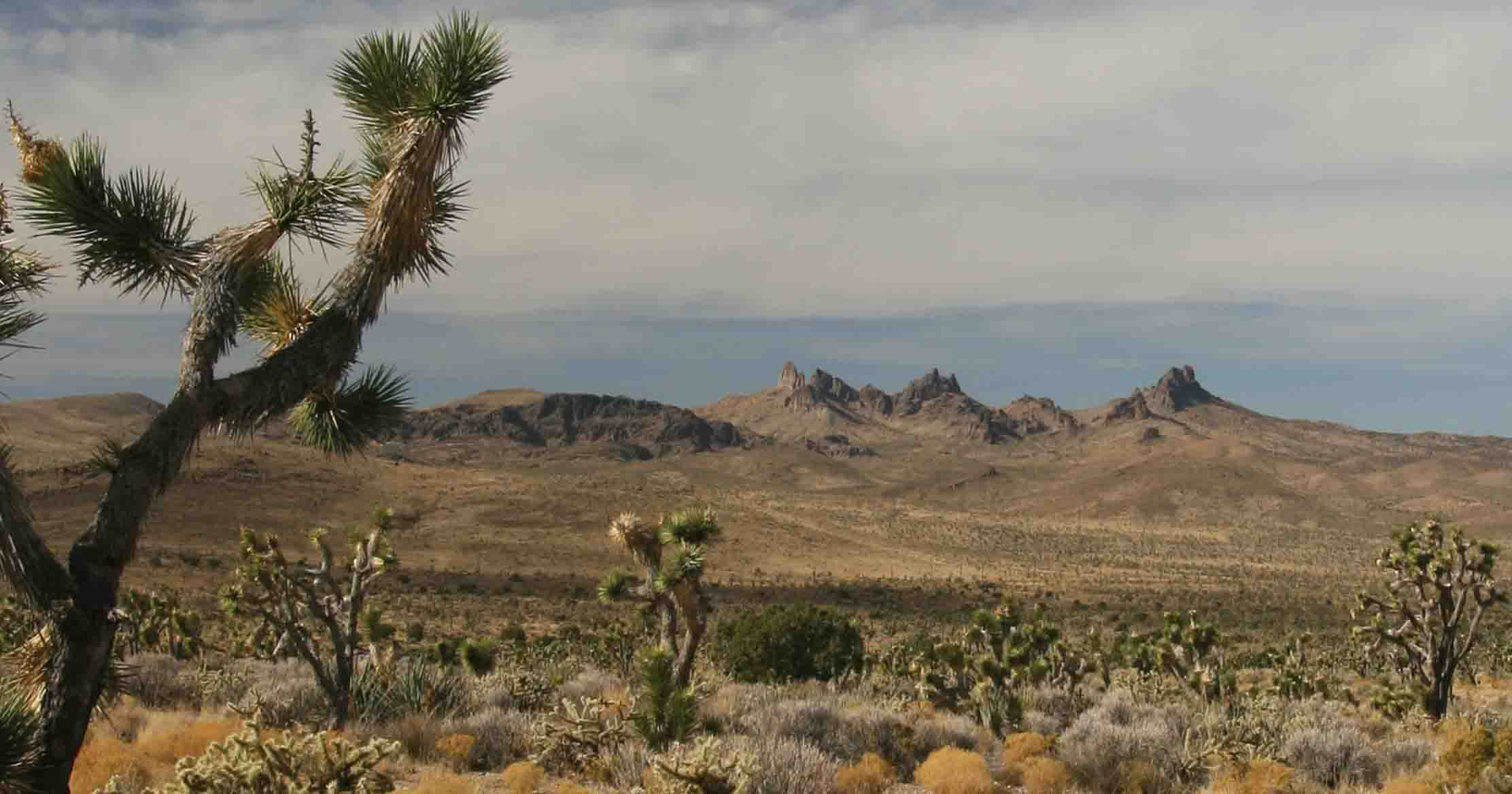

Highest point
- Elevation: 1,567 m (5,141 ft)

Geography
- Location within California
- Country: United States
- State(s): California and Nevada
- Range coordinates: 35°19′28.968″N 115°4′43.932″W
- Topo map: USGS Hart Peak

The Castle Mountains are located in the Eastern Mojave Desert, in northeastern San Bernardino County, California, and Clark County, Nevada. The range lies south and east of the New York Mountains, southwest of Searchlight and west of Cal-Nev-Ari, Nevada.

The range lies at the northeastern end of the Lanfair Valley, and reaches an elevation of 5,543 feet above sea level at the summit of Hart Peak. The mountains lie in a southwest-northeasterly direction in both states, although most of the range is in California. The Piute Range lies to the southeast.

Canadian NewCastle Gold Ltd. currently holds the rights to the Castle Mountain Mine Area, an open pit gold mine in the southern Castle Mountains. The company has the right to excavate nearly 10 million tons of ore through 2025. Due to low gold prices, however, mining has been suspended since 2001.

== Castle Mountains National Monument ==
Castle Mountains National Monument was established by President Obama on 12 February 2016. It designates a portion of the Castle Mountains and the surrounding area a national monument, managed by the National Park Service. It protects 20,920 acres between the interstates I−15 and I−40. The old mining camp of Hart close to the California−Nevada border is in it.

Castle Mountains National Monument is surrounded on three sides by the NPS Mojave National Preserve.

The national monument surrounds the Castle Mountain Mine Area. The proclamation establishing the monument states that after any mining and reclamation are completed in the Area, or after 10 years if no mining occurs, the Federal land in the 8,340 acre Castle Mountain Mine Area is to be transferred to the National Park Service.

== See also ==
- Mountain ranges of the Mojave Desert
- Natural history of the Mojave Desert
- Mojave National Preserve topics
