= Kidwell Airport =

Airport in Clark County, Nevada

- IATA: none; ICAO: none; FAA LID: 1L4

Summary
- Airport type: Public use
- Owner: Nancy Kidwell
- Serves: Cal-Nev-Ari, Nevada
- Elevation AMSL: 2,605 ft (794 m)
- Coordinates: 35°18′20″N 114°52′58″W

Map
- Location of airport in Nevada 1L4 (the United States)

Runways
Direction	Length		Surface
Direction	ft	m	Surface
15/33	4,140	1,262	Dirt

Statistics (2011)
- Aircraft operations: 3,500
- Based aircraft: 17
- Source: Federal Aviation Administration

Kidwell Airport (FAA LID: 1L4) is a public use airport located south of Cal-Nev-Ari, in Clark County, Nevada, United States.

== Facilities and aircraft ==
Kidwell Airport covers an area of 103 acres (42 ha) at an elevation of 2,605 feet (794 m) above mean sea level. It has one runway designated 15/33 with a dirt surface measuring 4,140 by 65 feet (1,262 x 20 m).

For the 12-month period ending January 31, 2011, the airport had 3,500 general aviation aircraft operations, an average of 291 per month. At that time there were 17 aircraft based at this airport: 76.5% single-engine, 17.6% ultralight, and 5.9% multi-engine.

== See also ==
- List of airports in Nevada
