= Lanfair Valley =

Valley in San Bernardino County, California, United States

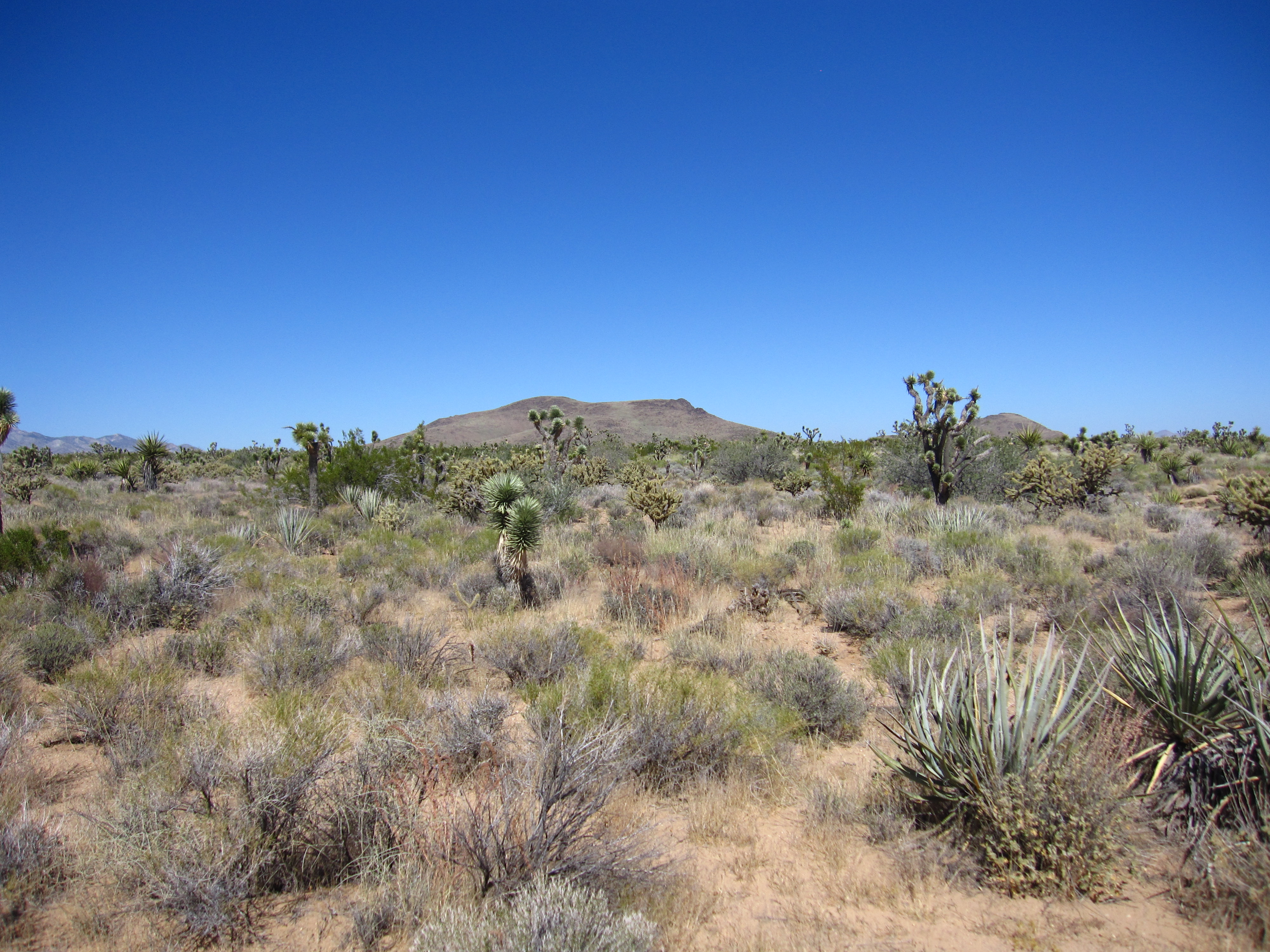
- Length: 30 mi (48 km)

Geography
- Location: United States
- Country: California
- States/Provinces: Mojave National Preserve; Mojave Desert
- Communities: Cima; Kelso; Lanfair
- Borders on: List: New York; Castle Mtns; Piute Range; Woods Mountains; Pinto Valley
- Coordinates: 35°17′20″N 115°6′12″W
- Interactive map of Lanfair Valley

Lanfair Valley is located in the Mojave Desert in southeastern California near the Nevada state line. The valley is bounded on the north by the New York Mountains and Castle Mountains, on the east by the Piute Range, and on the south by the Woods Mountains and Vontrigger Hills. Joshua Trees can be found in most of the valley. Elevation is 4,045 feet.

The valley proper is drained southeastwards, then due south by the Sacramento Wash; the wash then turns due-east and combines with the Piute Wash drainage (south out of Nevada), to immediately enter the west bank of the Colorado River. The dual valley drainage is a U-shape, and the first major dry wash drainage from the west, into the Colorado, south of Lake Mead.

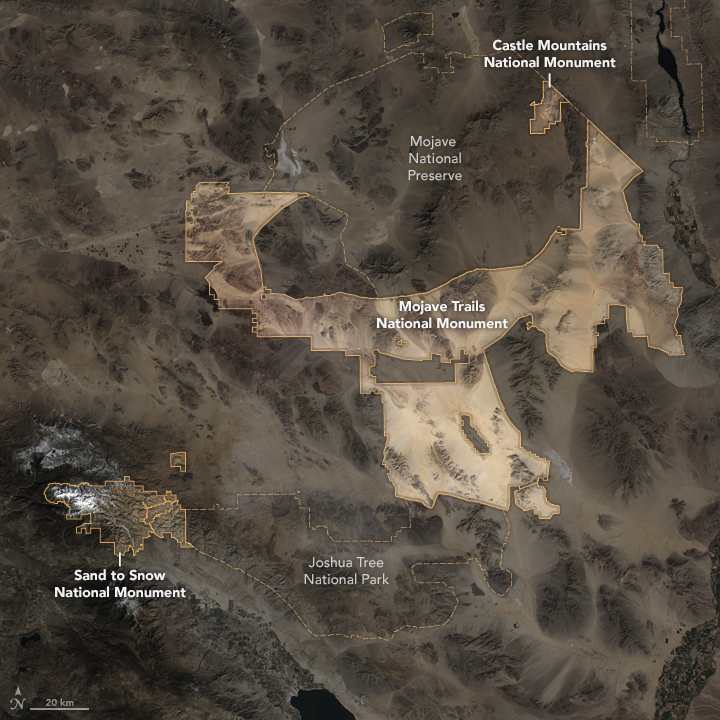
The Mojave National Preserve & Mojave Trails National Monument region (Nevada/California). The Landsat aerial photo shows Lake Mohave on the Colorado River at upper right. The two ~~north-south valleys paralleling the mostly south-trending mountain ranges at the rivers west, are the south-trending Lanfair Valley (west) and the Piute Valley (east). (The Castle Mountains National Monument is at the north and northeast perimeter of Lanfair Valley.)

== Mojave Road ==
The Old Mojave Road traverses the valley center, west to east. It passes eastwards just south of center at the Piute Range, and then through a central-southern stretch of the Piute Valley to its eastern terminus at Bullhead City Park, west bank of the Colorado River opposite Bullhead City, Arizona.

The Castle Mountains National Monument is part of the north and northeast perimeter of Lanfair Valley, (its watershed). The Castle Mountains (California) proper is on the water divide between the headwaters of a south-flowing section of Lanfair Valley, and a northwesterly section of the south-flowing Piute Wash of Piute Valley (the similar south-trending valley and wash adjacent east).

The central part of the valley contains the Grotto Hills (also known as Giotto Hills) and Lanfair Buttes.

== Lanfair, California ==
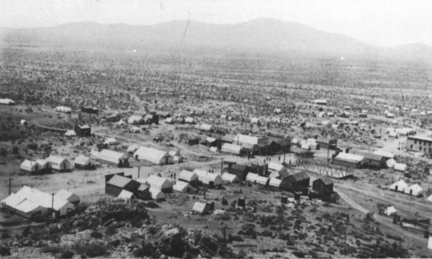
Lanfair ghost town

The valley is home to the Lanfair ghost town at the intersection of Cedar Canyon Road and Lanfair Road. While once thriving, all that is now left of the town of Lanfair is rubble. Both Lanfair Valley, and its ghost town, are named for Ernest L. Lanfair, a settlement owner. Tens of thousand of acres in the valley are privately held, despite being located in the Mojave National Preserve. Few people live in the valley today, but at one time there were schools, farms, post offices, and even a railroad.

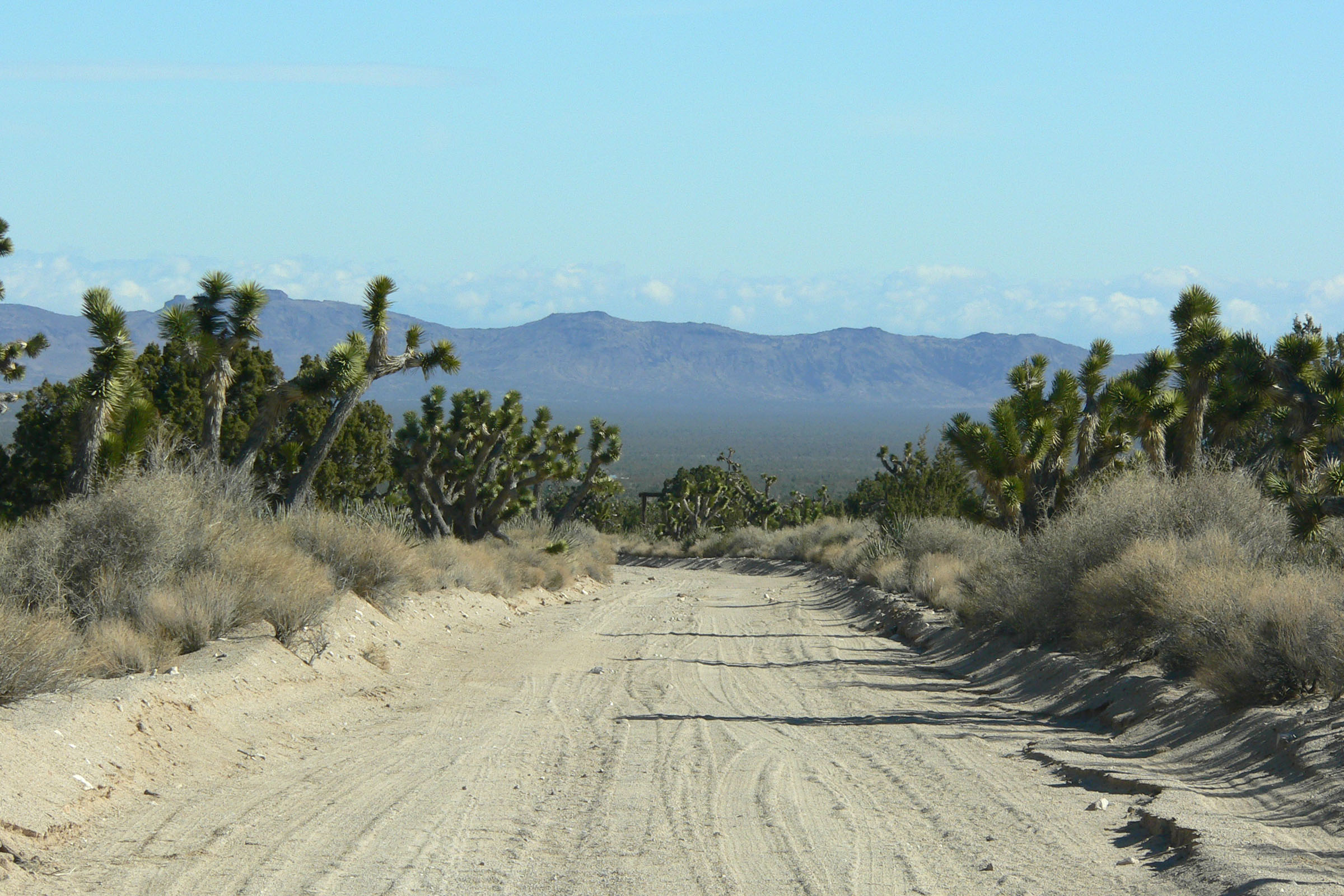
complete west-to-east Lanfair Valley vista to Piute Range (from foothills of New York Mountains, about 14 miles across valley

== Geography ==
The Hart ghost town site in the northeast of the Lanfair Valley is located at 35°17′20″N 115°6′12″W. Lanfair ghost town site is located at 35°07′36″N 115°11′00″W.

== See also ==
- Mojave National Preserve
- Mojave Road
- Piute Valley & Wash
