= Hackberry Mountain =

Mountain in California, United States

Hackberry Mountain is a mountain summit on the south of Lanfair Valley in eastern San Bernardino County, California. Its summit is 5,390 feet / 1,640 meters at 35°03′04″N 115°13′24″W.
