= Cima, California =

Unincorporated community in California, United States

Cima
- Unincorporated Community
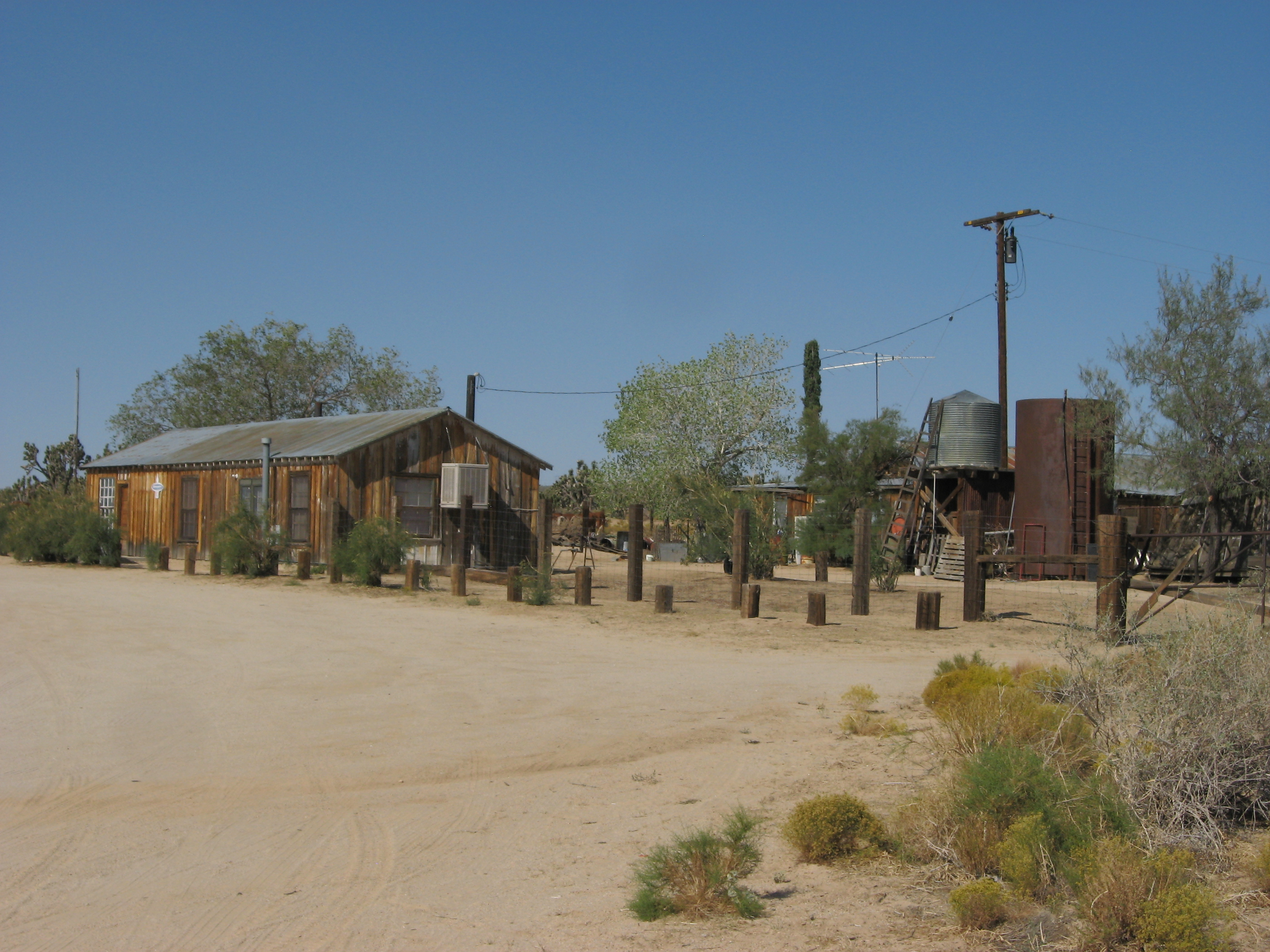
- Cima, California

- Location within the state of California Cima (the United States)
- Coordinates: 35°14′16″N 115°29′57″W
- Country: United States
- State: California
- County: San Bernardino; Mojave National Preserve southeast-Mojave Desert
- Founded: 1906
- Elevation: 4,175 ft (1,273 m)

Population (2000)
  - Total: 21
- Time zone: UTC-8 (Pacific (PST))
  - Summer (DST): UTC-7 (PDT)
- ZIP codes: 92323
- Area code: 760

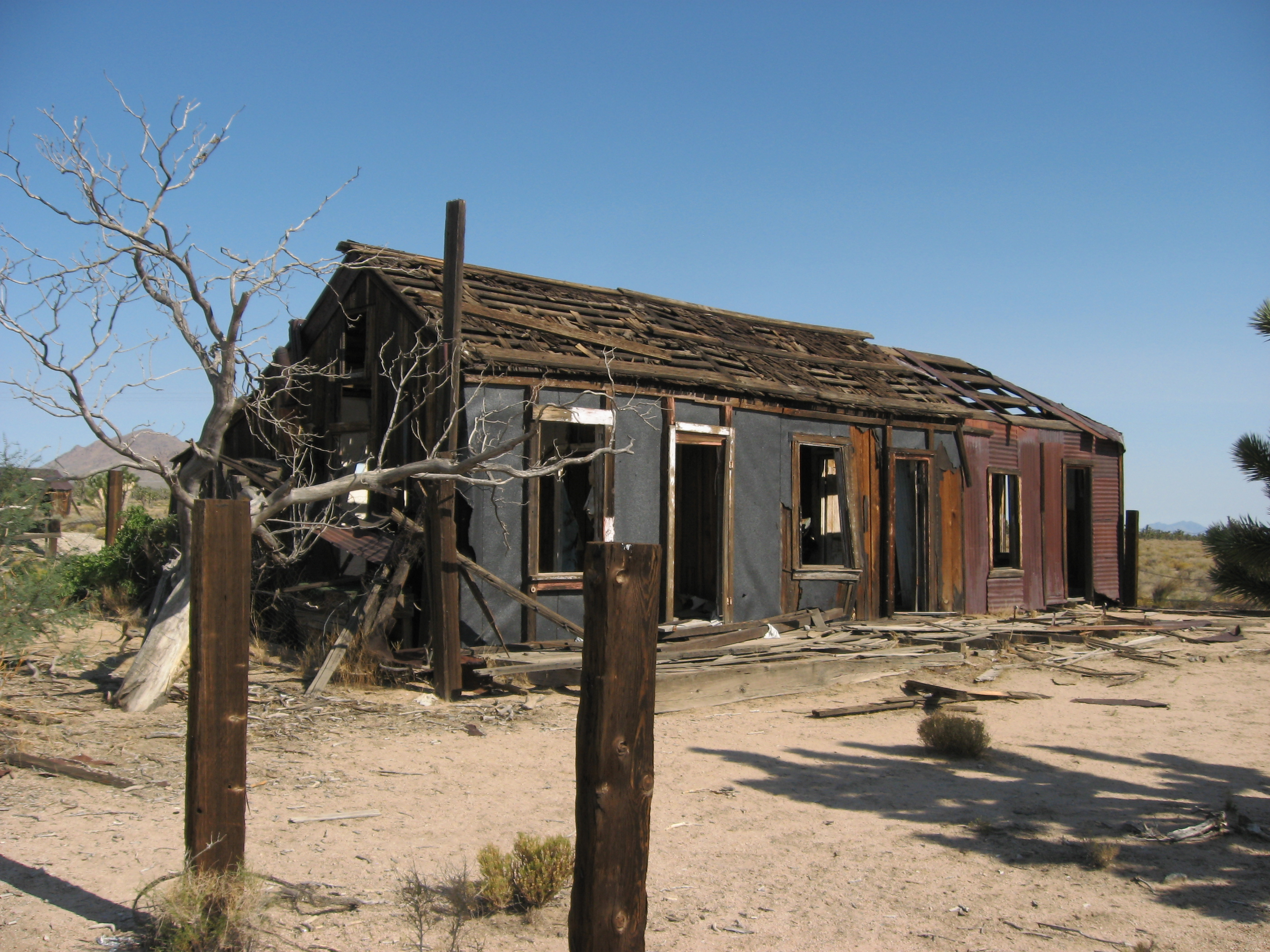
Abandoned building in Cima

Cima (Spanish for "Summit") is a small unincorporated community in the Mojave Desert of San Bernardino County, California, in the United States. It lies in a mountain pass on the divide between the Ivanpah Valley and the Mojave River basin, at an elevation of 4,175 feet (1,273 m). The Ivanpah Mountains and Interstate 15 are to the north, the New York Mountains are to the east, and the Providence Mountains are to the south. To the northwest is the Cima volcanic field, which contains Cima Dome at 5,745 feet (1,751 m) above sea level, a prominent landmark along I-15. Cima is also home to one of the densest Yucca brevifolia forests in California, located in the Cima Dome.

== History ==
Herbert Graham Gibson established the first store at Cima in 1900. In 1905 the first post office opened in the store. Gibson refused to pump the gas for his customers and therefore may have created the first self-service station in the country. The site served as both a railroad siding and a commercial center for ranchers and miners.

Few people now live in the area. In fact, like the neighboring town of Kelso to the southwest, Cima is now usually considered a ghost town. Nevertheless, both towns still see considerable activity on the Union Pacific (formerly the Los Angeles and Salt Lake) rail line that brought the towns into being. Between Kelso and Cima lies the Cima Grade, the steepest part of the line between the Los Angeles area and Las Vegas. The tracks rise 2,000 feet (610 m) in 20 miles (32 km). Both sites also lie within the Mojave National Preserve, with the attendant tourist activity.

== Climate ==
For Cima, the average high temperature in July is 93 °F (34 °C), with an average low of 67 °F (19 °C). January averages are 51 °F (11 °C) and 29 °F (−2 °C). The highest temperature on record is 110 °F (43 °C) in 1967, and the lowest is −2 °F (−19 °C), recorded in 1972. Cima receives less than 10 inches (250 mm) of rain in an average year.

Cima had a post office, with the ZIP code 92323 and the area code 760. In 2011, the post office was closed, however the 92323 ZIP code remains in use. The 92323 ZIP Code Tabulation Area had a population of 21 at the 2000 census.
