= Fort Piute =

Coordinates: 35°06′54″N 114°59′07″W

Fort Piute, originally named Fort Beale, was a post first established by Captain James H. Carleton, of the 1st Dragoons. Fort Piute lies at the elevation 2,828 feet / 862 meters near the place where the surface flow of Piute Creek ends, after running down stream from Piute Spring creating an oasis. Where the surface flow of the creek ends it descends into the soil of the wash of Piute Creek that then turns to run to the southwest towards the Colorado River.

== History ==
Fort Piute was an outpost of Camp Cady and later of Fort Mojave. It was one of a series of posts built to protect wagon traffic along the Mojave Road and keep local Native American people of the Mojave Desert away from the springs on the route during the periods of hostilities with them between 1859 and 1870.

== See also ==
- Bitter Spring Expedition
