= New York Mountains =

Mountain range in California and Nevada, US

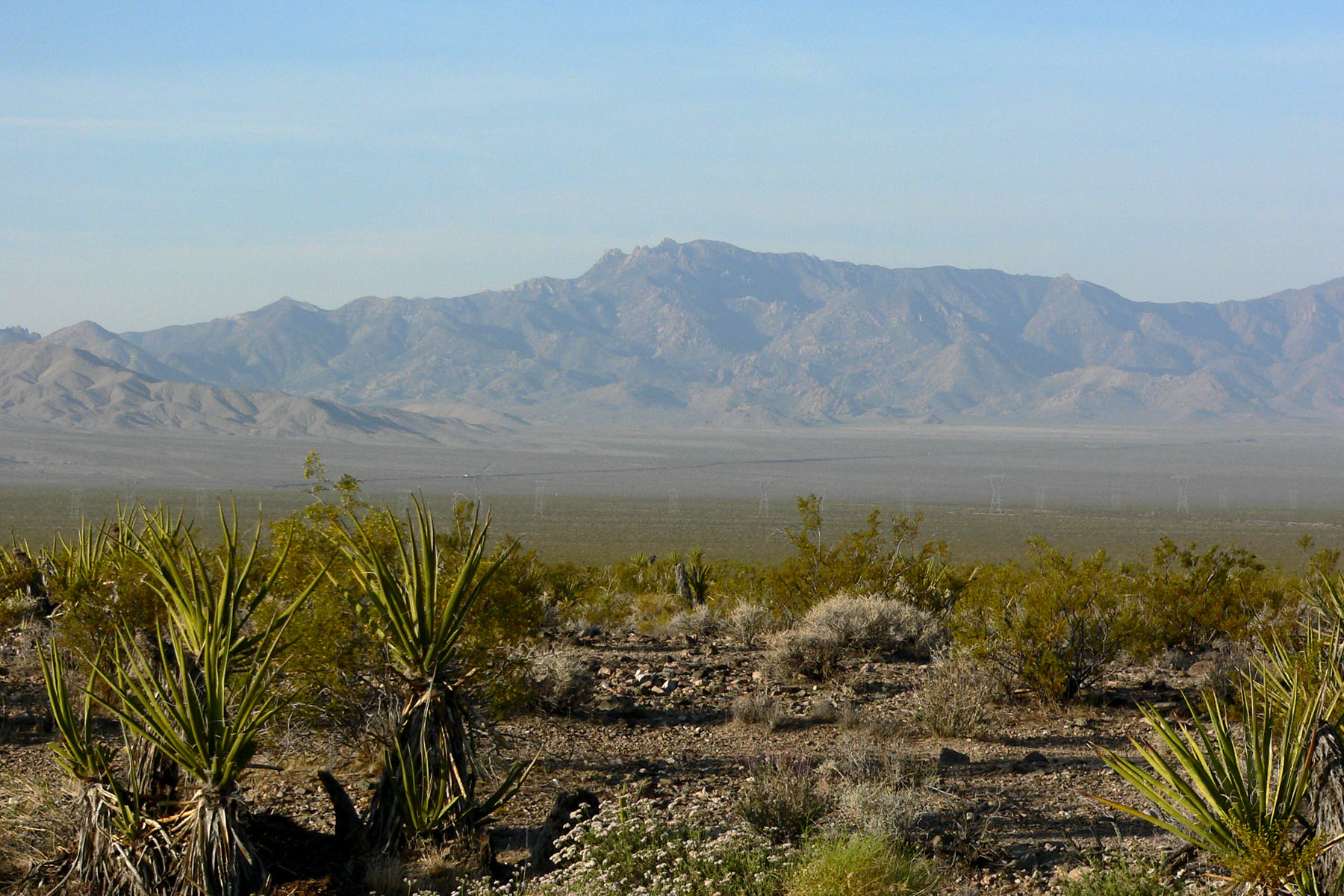
- New York Mountains from Nipton Road across the Ivanpah Valley

Highest point
- Elevation: 7,533 ft (2,296 m)
- Coordinates: 35°15′31″N 115°18′40″W

Dimensions
- Length: 30 mi (48 km) SW-NE
- Width: 14 mi (23 km)

Geography
- Location within California
- Country: United States
- States: California; Nevada
- Regions: Mojave National Preserve; Mojave Desert
- Counties: San Bernardino County, California; Clark County, Nevada
- Settlements: Ivanpah; Cima
- Range coordinates: 35°19′53″N 115°14′33″W
- Topo map: USGS Castle Peaks

The New York Mountains are a small mountain range found in northeastern San Bernardino County in California, US. The range's northeastern area lies in southeastern Nevada. The range lies just south of the small community of Ivanpah, and north of the Lanfair Valley. The mountains are part of the mountain ranges, cones, mountains, and landforms in the Mojave National Preserve. The mountains reach an elevation of 7,533 feet (2,296 m), and run in a mostly southwest-northeasterly direction between the Providence Mountains and the McCullough Range approximately five miles into Nevada and border the northwest corner of the Piute Valley of Nevada–California.

The New York Mountains are part of the southeast border of the Great Basin Divide. The Piute Wash Watershed empties eastward into the Colorado River.

== Description ==
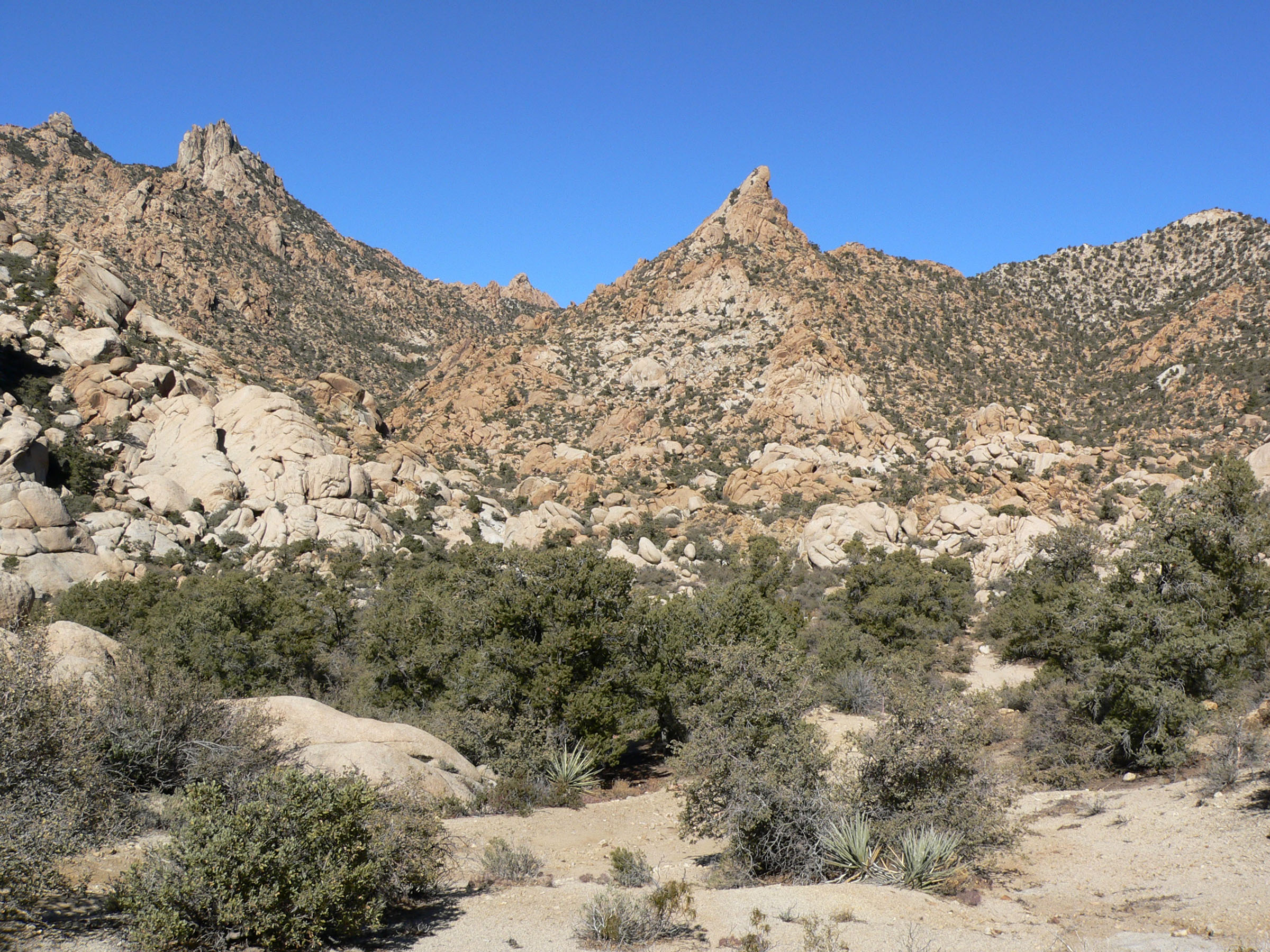
Caruthers Canyon, New York Mountains

The New York Mountains are a southwest by northeast trending range, about 30 miles (48 km) long with the northeast in Nevada. Searchlight, Nevada, and Cal-Nev-Ari, Nevada, lie to the northeast and east, respectively, across the Piute Valley. The Castle Mountains lie to the southeast with the Piute Range adjacent to the southeast.

The northeast flowing Ivanpah Valley drains the northwest side of the New York Mountains with the Ivanpah Mountains across the valley to the northwest. The McCullough Range of Nevada lies adjacent to the north.

== See also ==
- Mojave National Preserve
