= Dead Mountains =

Mountain range in California, United States

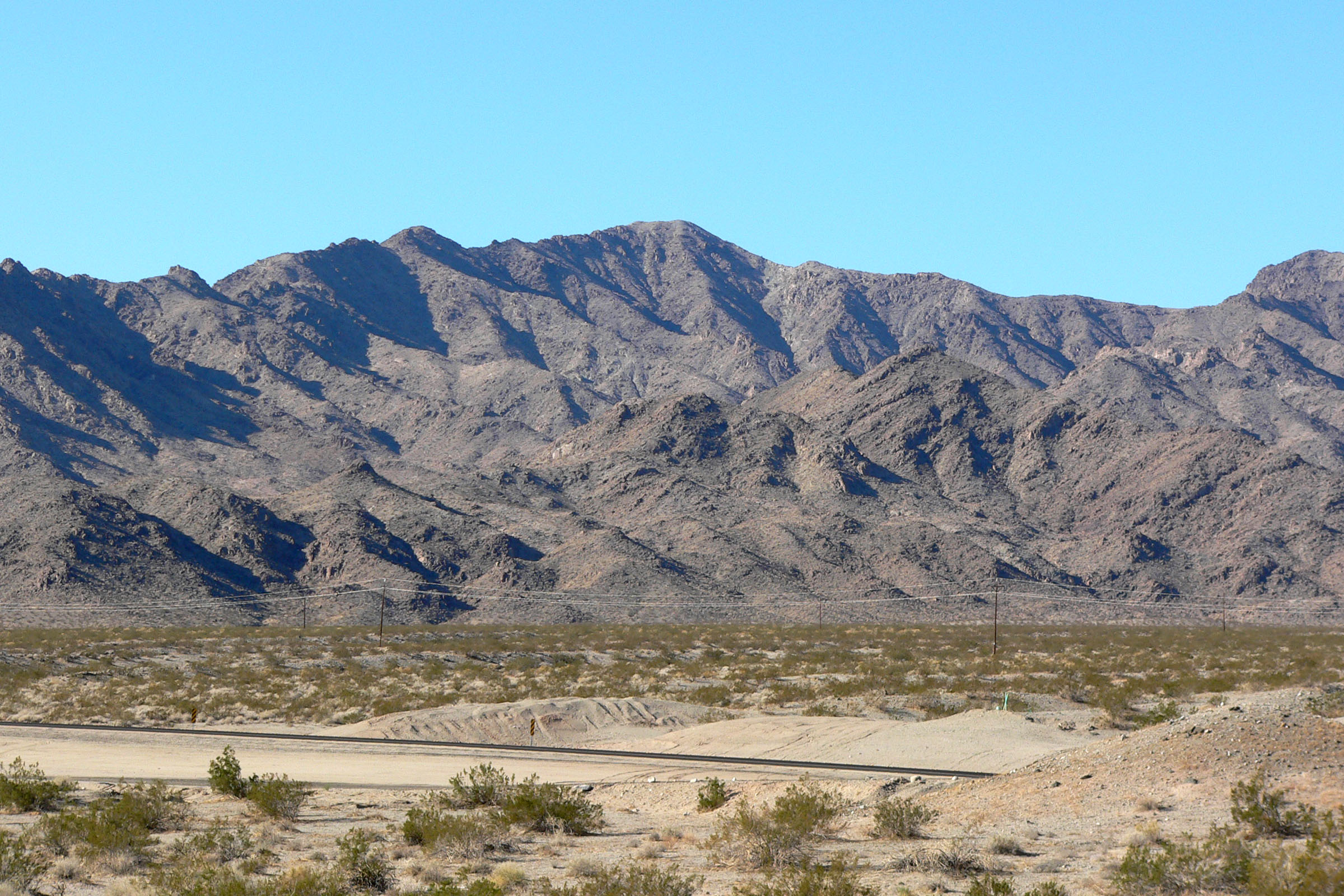
- Seen from Needles Highway-(I-40)

Highest point
- Peak: Mount Manchester
- Elevation: 3,602 ft (1,098 m) NAVD 88
- Coordinates: 35°01′40″N 114°44′56″W

Dimensions
- Length: 11 mi (18 km) N-S
- Width: 5 mi (8.0 km) E-W-(widest at north)

Geography
- Location within California
- Country: United States
- State: California
- Region(s): (southeast)-Mojave Desert (Lower Colorado River Valley)
- County: San Bernardino County
- Communities: Needles, CA; Mohave Valley, AZ
- Range coordinates: 35°01′40″N 114°44′56″W
- Borders on: Newberry Mountains-N; Piute Valley & Wash-W & S; Colorado River-E; Interstate 40 in California-S
- Topo map: USGS Mount Manchester

The Dead Mountains are a mountain range in the southeastern Mojave Desert, in San Bernardino County, California. The range borders the tri-state intersection of Nevada, Arizona and California, and the Mohave Valley, with the Fort Mojave Indian Reservation bordering the range foothills on the east and northeast, in the three states.

== Geography ==
The Dead Mountains are 12 miles (19 km) northwest of Needles, California. They border the Colorado River on the east, and the Piute Wash of the Piute Valley on the west. Piute wash drains south, then turns east for 8 mi (13 km) at the south of the range to meet the Colorado River.

Mount Manchester is the highest point at 3,598 feet (1,097 m).

== Dead Mountains Wilderness ==
The rust colored mountains, which cover 46,758 acres, were designated the Dead Mountains Wilderness in 1994 by the United States Congress as part of the California Desert Protection Act of 1994. They are maintained by the Bureau of Land Management. The vegetation is mostly creosote bush and desert wash scrub. The California Desert Conservation Area is located within the wilderness and smoke trees are found there.

The wildlife found on the mountains includes coyote, a small herd of bighorn sheep, rattlesnakes, falcons, hawks, eagles. A portion of the wilderness is critical habitat for the endangered desert tortoise.

== See also ==
- Category: Flora of the California desert regions
- Category: Mountain ranges of the Mojave Desert
- Category: Protected areas of the Mojave Desert
