= Eldorado Dry Lake =

Dry lake in Nevada, United States

- Location in Nevada
- Interactive map of Eldorado Dry Lake
- Location: Eldorado Valley, Clark County, Nevada, United States
- Coordinates: 35°51′18″N 114°56′53″W
- Type: Dry lake (playa)
- Part of: Mojave Desert
- Primary inflows: Seasonal runoff
- Primary outflows: None (endorheic basin)
- Catchment area: Eldorado Valley
- Basin countries: United States
- Surface elevation: 1,708 ft (521 m)

Eldorado Dry Lake is a playa in the Eldorado Valley in Clark County, Nevada. It lies at an elevation of 1,708 feet at the bottom of the basin of Eldorado Valley. It is situated approximately 30 miles southeast of Las Vegas and immediately west of U.S. Highway 95. The valley is an Endorheic basin, meaning all drainage collects internally with no outlet, and the dry lake occupies the north end as a salt pan.

== History ==
The Eldorado Dry Lake area has evidence of human occupation dating back to the early prehistoric period, with archeological surveys documenting Lithic scatter, and prehistoric sites around the lakes perimeter indicative of tool-making and resource processing activities. These sites were most likely used by mobile hunter-gatherer groups adapting to the desert environment

== Geology and scientific research ==
The playa has a largely flat, barren surface characterized by dried mud cracks and fine-grained sediments. Research conducted at the site has identified clay-rich soils and mineral aggregates. Strong winds can transport dust from the lakebed and surrounding desert terrain.

In July 2011, researchers conducted a field campaign at Eldorado Dry Lake to investigate atmospheric electrical properties associated with windblown dust. The resulting study, published in 2013, examined changes in electric fields and air resistivity during dust activity.

A study published in 2022 identified geological and geochemical evidence of ancient groundwater discharge activity near the Eldorado Dry Playa. Radiocarbon dating indicated that the groundwater discharge system experienced periods of activity between approximately 13,900 and 4,880 years before present, reflecting past changes in the regional climate and hydrological conditions.
