= Sloan Canyon National Conservation Area =

- Sloan Petroglyph Site and Boundary Increase
- U.S. National Register of Historic Places
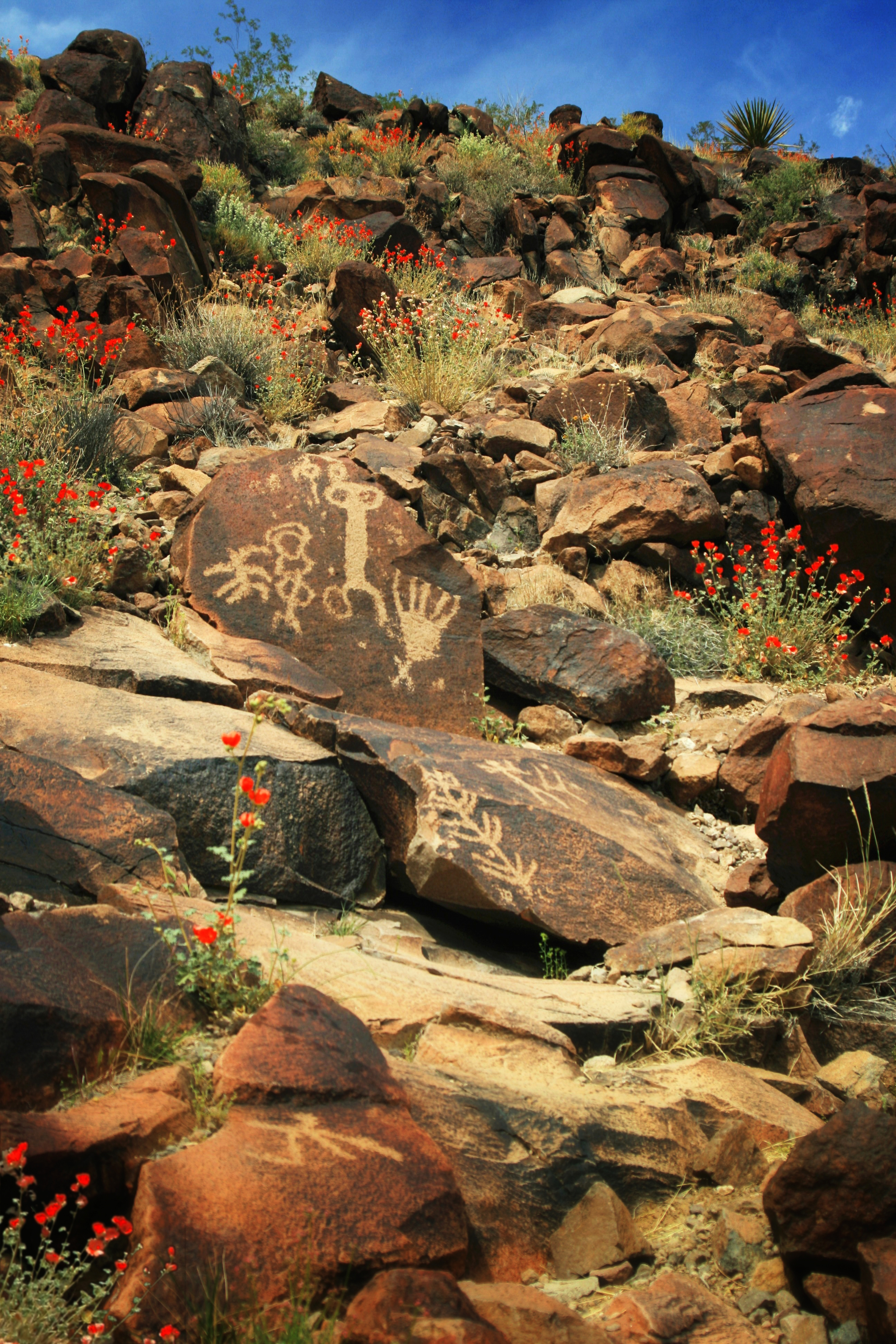
- Petroglyphs and wildflowers in Sloan Canyon
- Location: Clark County, Nevada
- Nearest city: Henderson, Nevada
- Coordinates: 35°55′0.178″N 115°7′33.712″W
- NRHP reference No.: 78001720 (original); 02000114 (increase)

Significant dates
- Added to NRHP: December 19, 1978
- Boundary increase: February 5, 2004

Sloan Canyon National Conservation Area is a National Conservation Area (NCA) administered by the United States Bureau of Land Management (BLM). It includes the Sloan Petroglyph Site which was listed on the National Register of Historic Places on December 19, 1978. It is located south of Henderson, Nevada, access is available from Las Vegas Boulevard, near the Del Webb Anthem development in Henderson. Sloan Canyon NCA protects 48,438 acres (19,602 ha).

== Petroglyphs ==
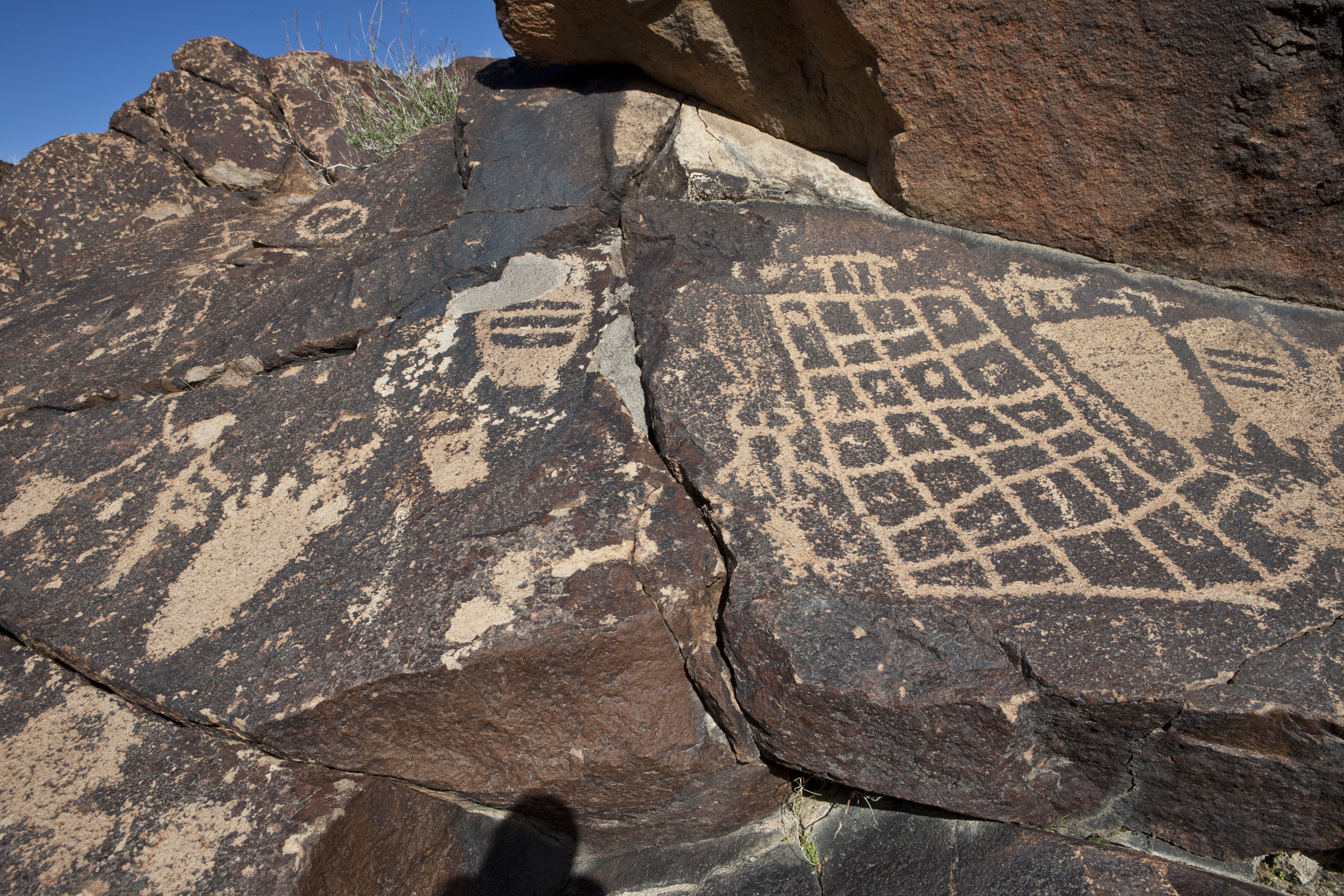
Petroglyph panel. Grid may represent a farm.

Sloan Canyon contains a great many petroglyphs and has been called the Sistine Chapel of Native American rock art due to their size and significance. Archaeologists believe the more than 300 rock art panels with 1,700 individual design elements were created by native cultures from the Archaic to historic eras.

The BLM currently maintains a policy of not publicizing the exact location of the petroglyphs due to recent problems with vandalism. Access to the NCA is further hampered by the rapid development of private land and to ongoing conflicts over land use and zoning.

Sloan Canyon NCA is (as of November 2006) closed to camping, shooting and offroad vehicle access, due to dumping and vandalism. Hiking, biking and horseback riding are encouraged on existing roads and trails. The BLM asks that you respect the rock art, and be a responsible visitor.

The North McCullough Wilderness Area which covers the northern part of the McCullough Range is contained within the boundaries of the NCA.

== Trailheads ==
- Dutchman Pass (Mission Hills) on the east boundary
- Quo Vadis on the east boundary
- Hidden Valley on the west southern boundary
- Petroglyph Canyon on the western boundary (South of Inspirada)
- Shadow Canyon on the western mid boundary (Inside Solara)
- Anthem Hills on the western north boundary (South Anthem)

== See also ==
- Category: Native American history of Nevada
- Category:Pueblo peoples

== Sources and external links ==
- Sloan Canyon NCA website at BLM
