= McCullough Range =

Mountain range in Clark County, Nevada, United States

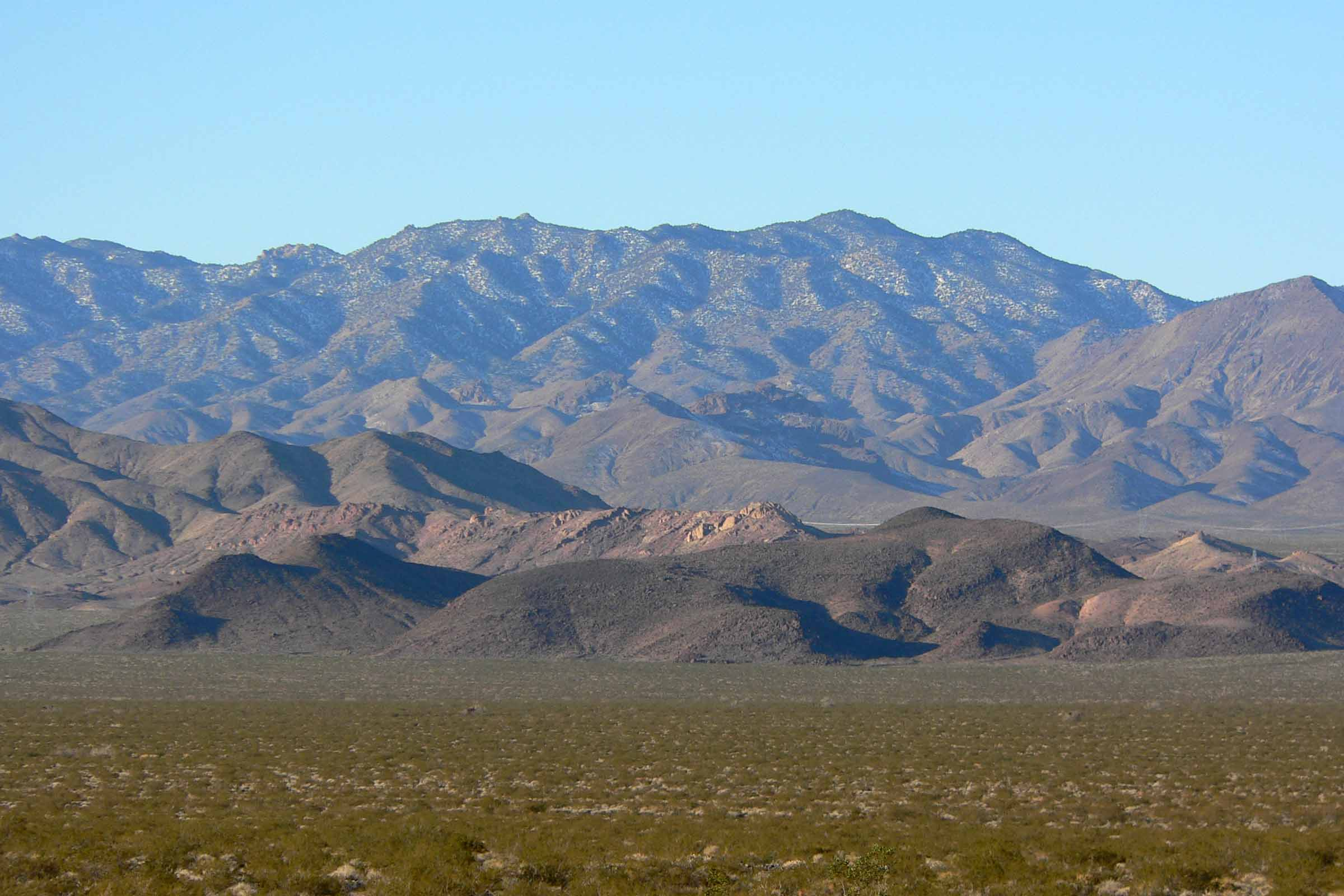
- The McCullough Range as seen from Eldorado Valley in Southern Nevada

Highest point
- Peak: McCullough Mountain
- Elevation: 2,141.5 m (7,026 ft)

Geography
- Location within Nevada
- Country: United States
- State: Nevada
- District: Clark County
- Range coordinates: 35°54′57″N 115°2′54″W
- Topo map: USGS Sloan NE

The McCullough Range is a mountain range forming the southeastern edge of the Las Vegas Valley and the southern end of Henderson in the U.S. state of Nevada, The range has two distinct areas including the North McCullough Wilderness being primarily volcanic in origin, and the South McCullough Wilderness being primarily composed of metamorphic rock.

McCullough Range was named after a pioneer settler.

== Wilderness areas ==
The Bureau of Land Management within the Department of the Interior designates portions of the range's northern and southern halves as the North McCullough Wilderness and South McCullough Wilderness. The North McCullough Wilderness is within Sloan Canyon National Conservation Area which borders the Anthem planned community in Henderson The South McCullough Wilderness is part of Avi Kwa Ame National Monument, designated in 2023.

== McCullough range geography ==
The McCullough Range is surrounded by three valleys. First, the Las Vegas Valley lies to the north; next, the north region of the Ivanpah Valley, with two major dry lakes borders the west; and to the east lies the endorheic basin of the Eldorado Valley. The range specifically borders one mountain range at the south, being connected to the northeast higher elevation foothills of the New York Mountains. Just northeast of the intersection of the two ranges, and in the southwest of Eldorado Valley lies the small Highland Range.

== Natural history ==
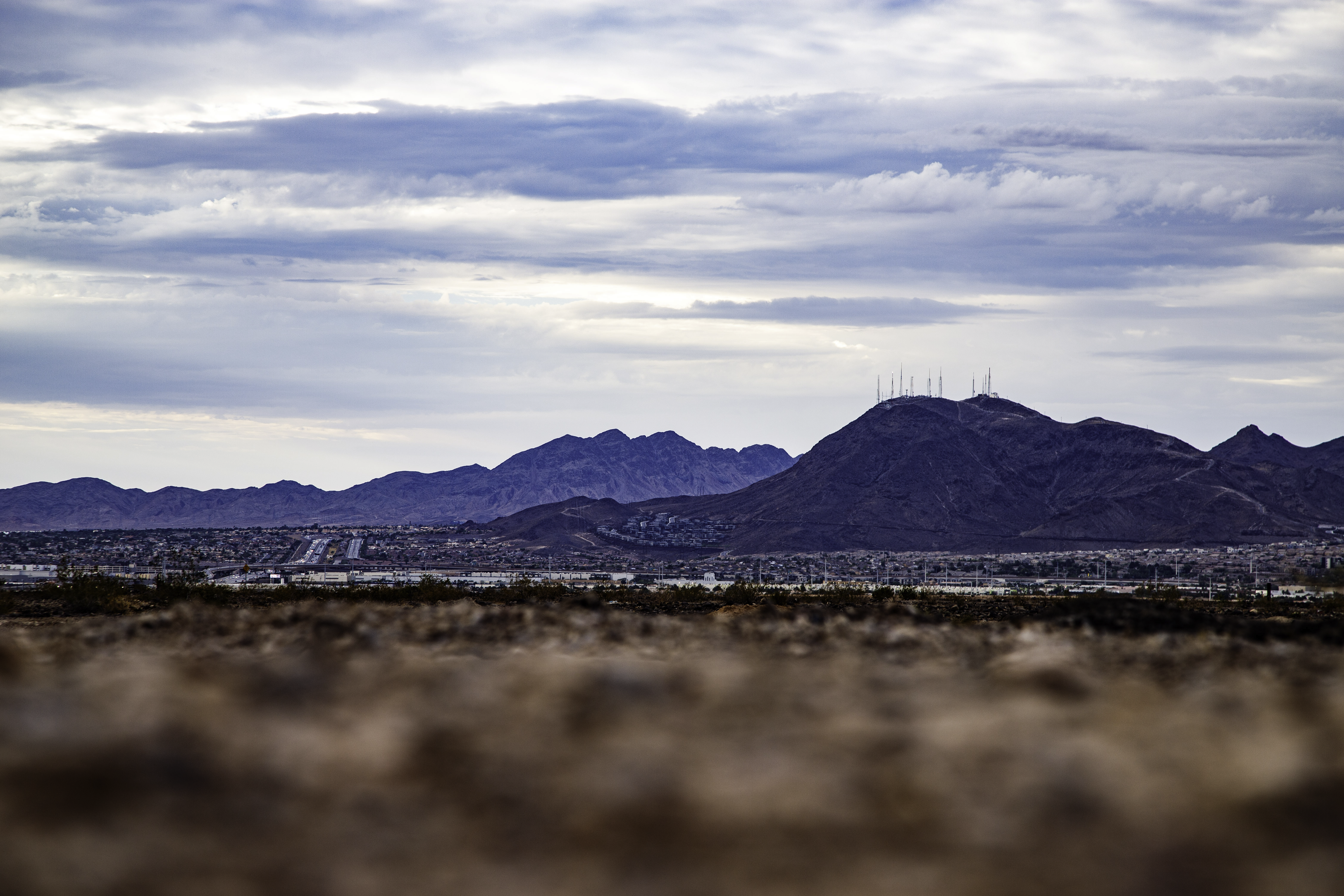
An unnamed peak hosting several television and radio transmission towers at the northern end of the McCullough Range overlooking Henderson, Nevada. It is commonly, and incorrectly, referred to as Black Mountain, which is actually a few miles south of this peak.

=== Northern ===
In the northern portion of the McCullough Range elevation spans from 2,000 ft (610 m) at the eastern base of the range to 5,092 ft (1,552 m) at Black Mountain. The peaks are volcanic in origin, rounded to flat-topped, and have a steep eastern escarpment and a gradual western slope. The area supports a unique combination of plants from the Mojave and Sonoran deserts and Great Basin Desert ecosystems.

The primary vegetation is a creosote bush community with barrel cactus (Ferocactus cylindraceus), Joshua trees (Yucca brevifolia), various chollas (Cylindropuntia spp.) and prickly pears (Opuntia spp.). Unlike other mountain ranges in Clark County, the McCullough Range is volcanic in origin. Examples of lava flows, ash falls and glassy zones are clearly visible. The area supports native black gramma grass (Bouteloua eriopoda), which is not known to occur anywhere else in Nevada and stands of teddy bear cholla (Cylindropuntia bigelovii), which is the northernmost extent of the species. Remarkable petroglyph panels and other important cultural resource features occur within the wilderness area.

Another peak northeast of Black Mountain is home to most of the radio and television transmission towers for the Las Vegas Valley.

=== Southern ===
Mountains of the South McCullough Wilderness at dusk near Jean, Nevada in 2026.

The southern portion consists of a north–south mountain range that drops off gradually to numerous valleys, foothills and sloping bajadas on the east and west flanks. Elevations range from 2,500 ft (760 m) in the northwest portion of the area to 7,026 ft (2,142 m) at McCullough Mountain in the center of the wilderness. Most of the area is composed of metamorphosed Precambrian rock, granite, and schist, although basalt and andesite flows occur in the northern reaches of the southern portion. Creosote bush (Larrea tridentata) scrub occurs below 4,500 ft (1,400 m); Joshua trees, Mojave yucca (Yucca schidigera), and other cacti occur between 3,500–5,000 ft (1,100–1,500 m); blackbrush occurs between 4,500–5,000 ft (1,400–1,500 m); pinyon-juniper occurs above 5,000 ft (1,500 m). Scattered mesquite/catclaw communities also occur in washes throughout the area.

Signs of prehistoric and Pre-Columbian habitation have been found in the area, including rock art, occupation and settlement sites, and pinyon pine nut caches. This was part of the historic homeland of the Mojave people.

The desert tortoise, Nelson bighorn sheep, Gambel's quail and chukar are present.
