= Eldorado Valley =

Basin in Clark County, Nevada, United States

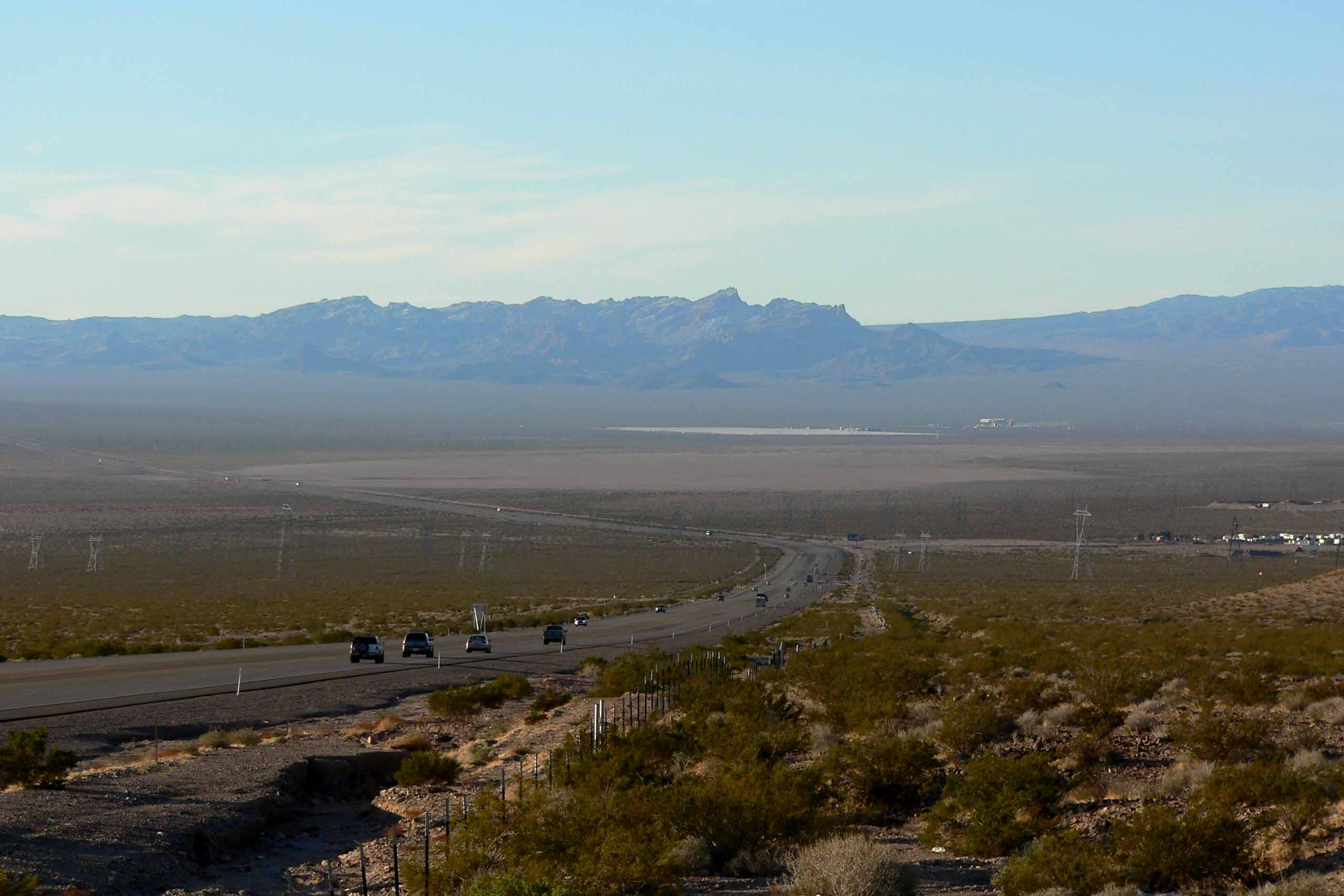
- View south of Eldorado Valley's center & north; (Highland Range, (center photo) on valley's southwest perimeter; playa visible, ~5-mi)

- Location within Nevada
- Length: 35 mi (56 km)
- Width: 18 mi (29 km)

Geography
- Location: Nevada, United States (southeast)-Mojave Desert (central-southeast)-Great Basin
- Population centers: Boulder City, NV-NE; Searchlight, NV-(south); Henderson, NV-NW
- Borders on: McCullough Range-W; River Mountains-NNE; Eldorado Mountains-E; Piute Valley-S; Highland Range-SSW
- Coordinates: 35°52.211′N 114°55.975′W
- Interactive map of Eldorado Valley

Eldorado Valley, or El Dorado Valley, is a Great Basin valley in the Mojave Desert southeast of Las Vegas and southwest of Boulder City, Nevada. The valley is endorheic, containing the Eldorado Dry Lake. The Great Basin Divide, transects ridgelines and saddles, on the north, northeast, east, and south around the valley, as the valley sits on the east of the McCullough Range, a Great Basin massif, on the Great Basin Divide at its north terminus and its south terminus. Much of the valley is protected as part of Avi Kwa Ame National Monument.

== Geography ==
The north end of the valley contains a large salt pan, or dry lake, Dry Lake or Eldorado Playa, while the southern two thirds drains northwards. U.S. Route 95 traverses eastern portions of the valley, and climbs steeply to meet U.S. Route 93, connecting Boulder City to Henderson.

The endorheic basin lies north of the Piute Wash Watershed, of the north-south Piute Valley. The Piute Wash drains south, then southeast to the Colorado River.

== Highland Range Crucial Bighorn Habitat ==
The southern valley includes a habitat nature reserve for the Desert Bighorn Sheep, named the 'Highland Range Crucial Bighorn Habitat'. There are no public access routes into the habitat area, to protect the Bighorn.

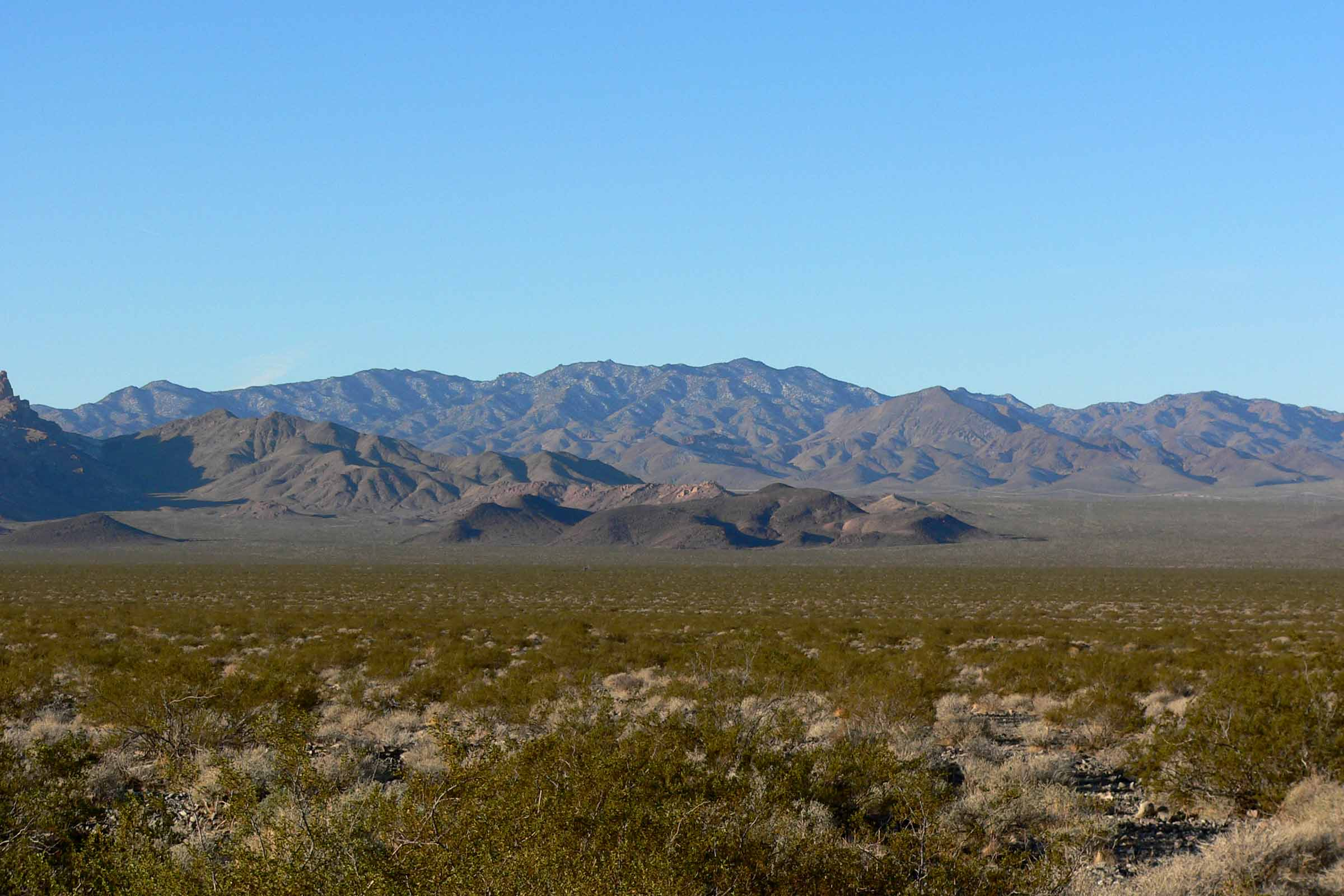
Valley's center-south, from east side.
(North end of Highland Range (from east-southeast), McCullough Range massif beyond.)

== Solar power ==
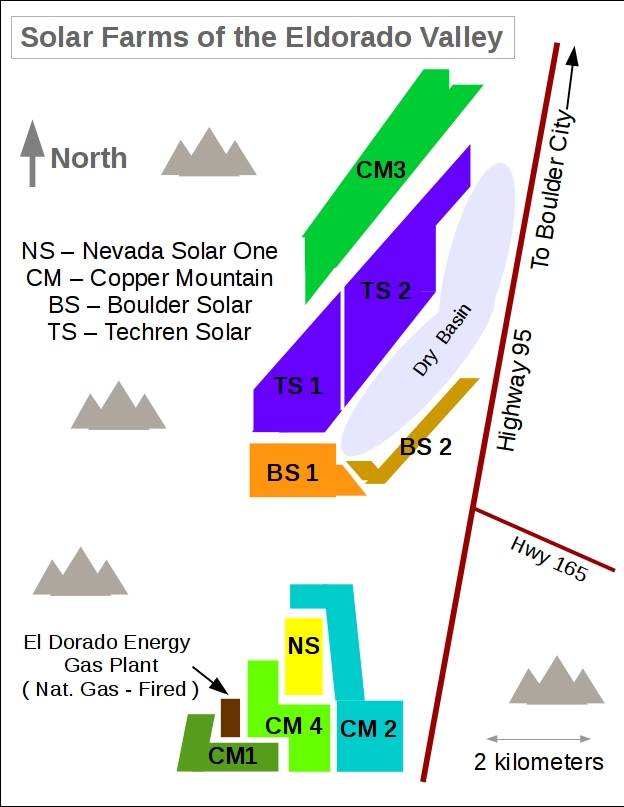
Map of solar farms in the valley

The northern valley contains Boulder City's "Eldorado Energy Zone" which is home to the 480 MW El Dorado natural gas power plant completed in the year 2000. Since 2007, it is also home to the concentrated solar power plant, Nevada Solar One, as well as a growing number of photovoltaic power stations, including:

- Copper Mountain Solar Facility
- Boulder Solar Project
- Techren Solar Project
