= Piute Wash =

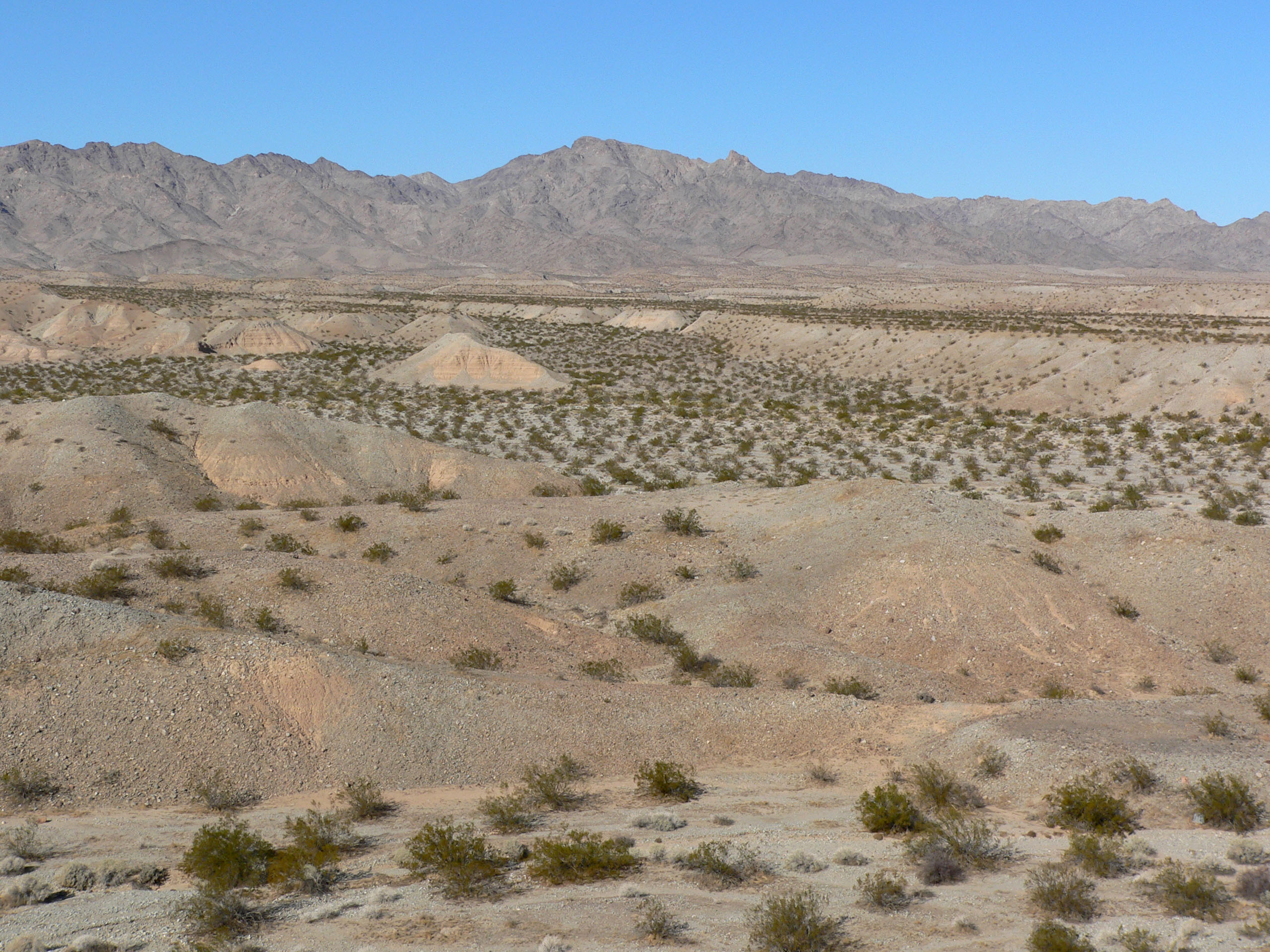
- Outfall region of Piute Wash (NW of Needles & Colorado River) (southeast Dead Mountains)

- Piute Wash (north, Cal-Nev-Ari, Nevada) in Nevada and California

Location
- Country: United States
- State: Nevada, California
- Region: (southeast)-Mojave Desert
- District: Searchlight, NV-N; Needles, CA & Mohave Valley, AZ-SE
- City: Cal-Nev-Ari, NV

Physical characteristics
- Length: 45 mi (72 km), (N-to-S, then E-(8 mi))

The Piute Wash of extreme southeastern Nevada and northeast San Bernardino County California is the south-flowing drainage of the Piute Valley. The wash and valley are located northwest of Needles, California.

The Piute Wash watershed and Piute Valley drain the eastern flank of the north–south Piute Range; the main wash drains portions of the northwest Newberry Mountains. The wash hugs the eastern portion of the Piute Valley, and in the southeast of the valley, the wash skirts the west of the Dead Mountains, then traverses the southwest and south perimeter of the Dead Mountains, then descends steeply toward its outfall into the Colorado River in California adjacent Needles. I-40 also descends steeply in this stretch down to Needles.

The Piute Valley and Wash are north–south trending as are the mountains bordering west and east; the wash's abrupt traverse east to its outfall is about an 8-mile (13 km) stretch.

== South Piute Valley ==
Southern portions of the wash receive some north flowing drainages from the north of the Sacramento Mountains. Also, west of the western perimeter Piute Range of Piute Valley, the Sacramento Wash (Clark County, Nevada) flows south, with the Fenner Valley in the northwest. The Sacramento Wash then turns east to join the Piute Wash. In the southwest a water divide separates the Ward Valley draining southwestwards into San Bernardino County.

== Piute Wash watershed ==
The Piute drainage is west of the Colorado River and Lake Mohave. A narrow drainage from the Newberry and Dead Mountains drain into the Havasu-Mohave Lakes Watershed.

To the north of the Piute Wash watershed and Searchlight is the north-flowing Eldorado Valley, an endorheic basin that forms a dry lake.

Cal-Nev-Ari, Nevada, is in the northern third of the valley. The elevation of Piute Wash outfall at the Colorado River, just north of Needles, is 488 feet (149 m).
