= Cal-Nev-Ari, Nevada =

- Census-designated place
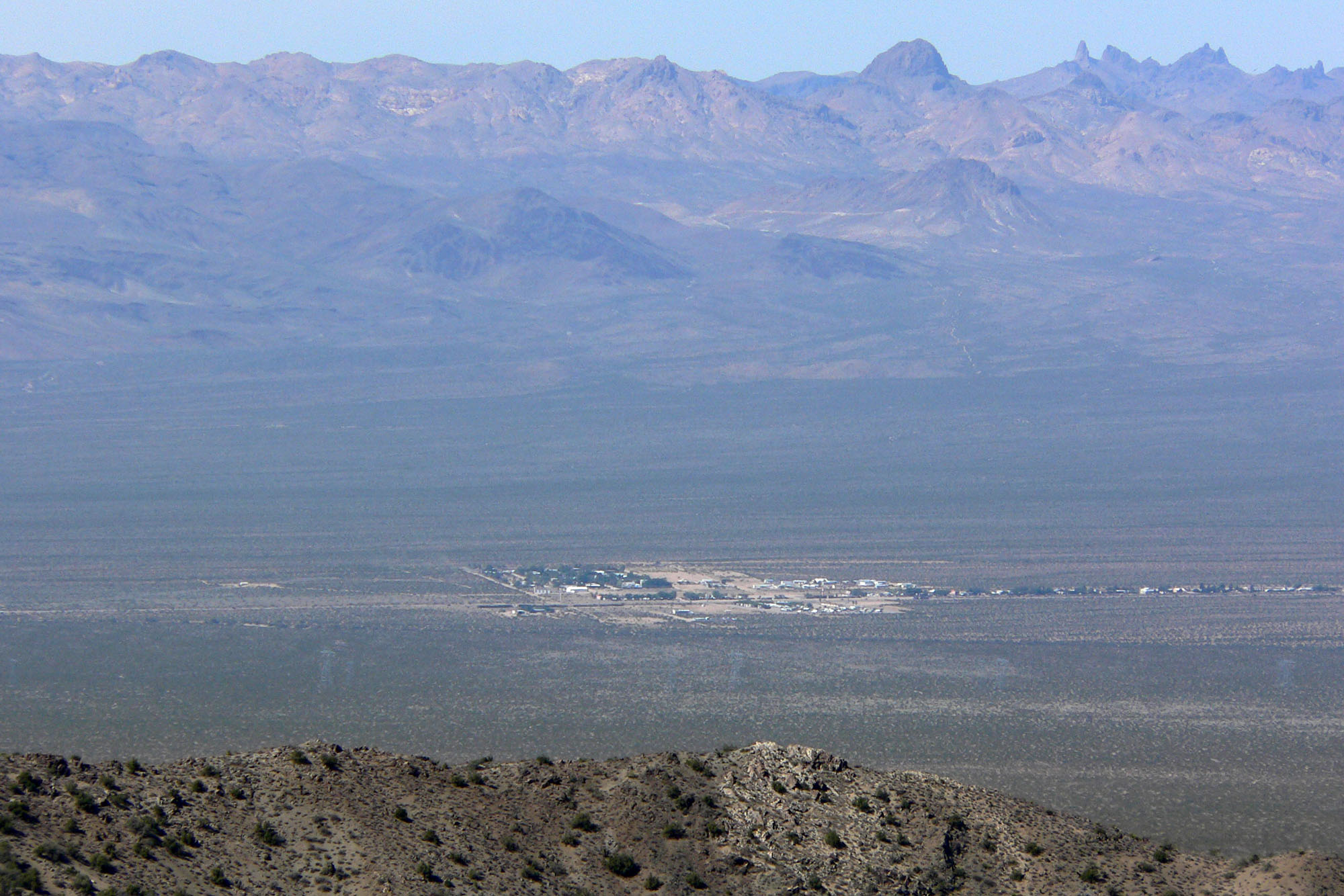
- Seen from Spirit Mountain to the east; New York Mountains in the distance

- Location of Cal-Nev-Ari in Clark County, Nevada

- Location in the United States
- Coordinates: 35°18′12″N 114°52′51″W
- Country: United States
- State: Nevada
- County: Clark
- Founded: 1965; 61 years ago
- Named for: California, Nevada and Arizona

Area
  - Total: 2.28 sq mi (5.90 km^{2})
  - Land: 2.28 sq mi (5.90 km^{2})
  - Water: 0 sq mi (0.00 km^{2})
- Elevation: 2,579 ft (786 m)

Population (2020)
  - Total: 144
  - Density: 63.2/sq mi (24.39/km^{2})
- Time zone: UTC-8 (PST)
  - Summer (DST): UTC-7 (PDT)
- ZIP code: 89039
- Area codes: 702 and 725
- FIPS code: 32-08600
- GNIS feature ID: 0858257

Cal-Nev-Ari is a census-designated place on U.S. Route 95 in Clark County, Nevada, United States, near the state's southernmost point. As of the 2020 census, Cal-Nev-Ari had a population of 144. The town's name is a syllabic abbreviation of California, Nevada, and Arizona.

Cal-Nev-Ari was created in 1965 by Nancy and Everette "Slim" Kidwell, who acquired a 640-acre (260 ha; 1.00 sq mi) section of land from the U.S. government and commenced development of an airport-based community, an hour by road from Las Vegas. In addition to the FAA-designated Kidwell Airport, the community has grown over the years to include a casino, motel, RV and mobile home parks, convenience market, and over 100 residential lots.

The town was listed for sale in 2016 for $8 million, although it had been originally listed in 2010 for $17 million. It sold for the $8 million price to Heart of Nature, an organic minerals company, which plans to use the water to manufacture sulfur products for farms.

== Geography ==
Cal-Nev-Ari is located at 35°18′12″N 114°52′51″W (35.303196, -114.880795).

According to the United States Census Bureau, the CDP has a total area of 2.3 square miles (6.0 km^{2}), all of it land.

== Demographics ==
Historical population
Census	Pop.	Note	%±
2000	278		—
2010	244		−12.2%
2020	144		−41.0%
U.S. Decennial Census

At the 2000 census, there were 278 people, 154 households, and 93 families in the CDP. The population density was 120.9 inhabitants per square mile (46.7/km^{2}). There were 199 housing units at an average density of 86.5 per square mile (33.4/km^{2}). The racial makeup of the CDP was 95.32% White, 1.80% from other races, and 2.88% from two or more races. Hispanic or Latino of any race were 2.16%.

Of the 154 households, 7.1% had children under the age of 18 living with them, 55.8% were married couples living together, 1.9% had a female householder with no husband present, and 39.6% were non-families. Of all households, 33.8% were one-person households and 14.9% were one-person households aged 65 or older. The average household size was 1.81 and the average family size was 2.20.

The age distribution was 7.6% under the age of 18, 1.1% from 18 to 24, 14.7% from 25 to 44, 42.1% from 45 to 64, and 34.5% 65 or older. The median age was 59 years. For every 100 females, there were 104.4 males. For every 100 females age 18 and over, there were 110.7 males.

The median household income was $42,563 and the median family income was $44,333. Males had a median income of $24,632 versus $19,531 for females. The per capita income for the CDP was $20,870. None of the population or families were below the poverty line.
