= Edgar Peak =

Mountain in California, United States

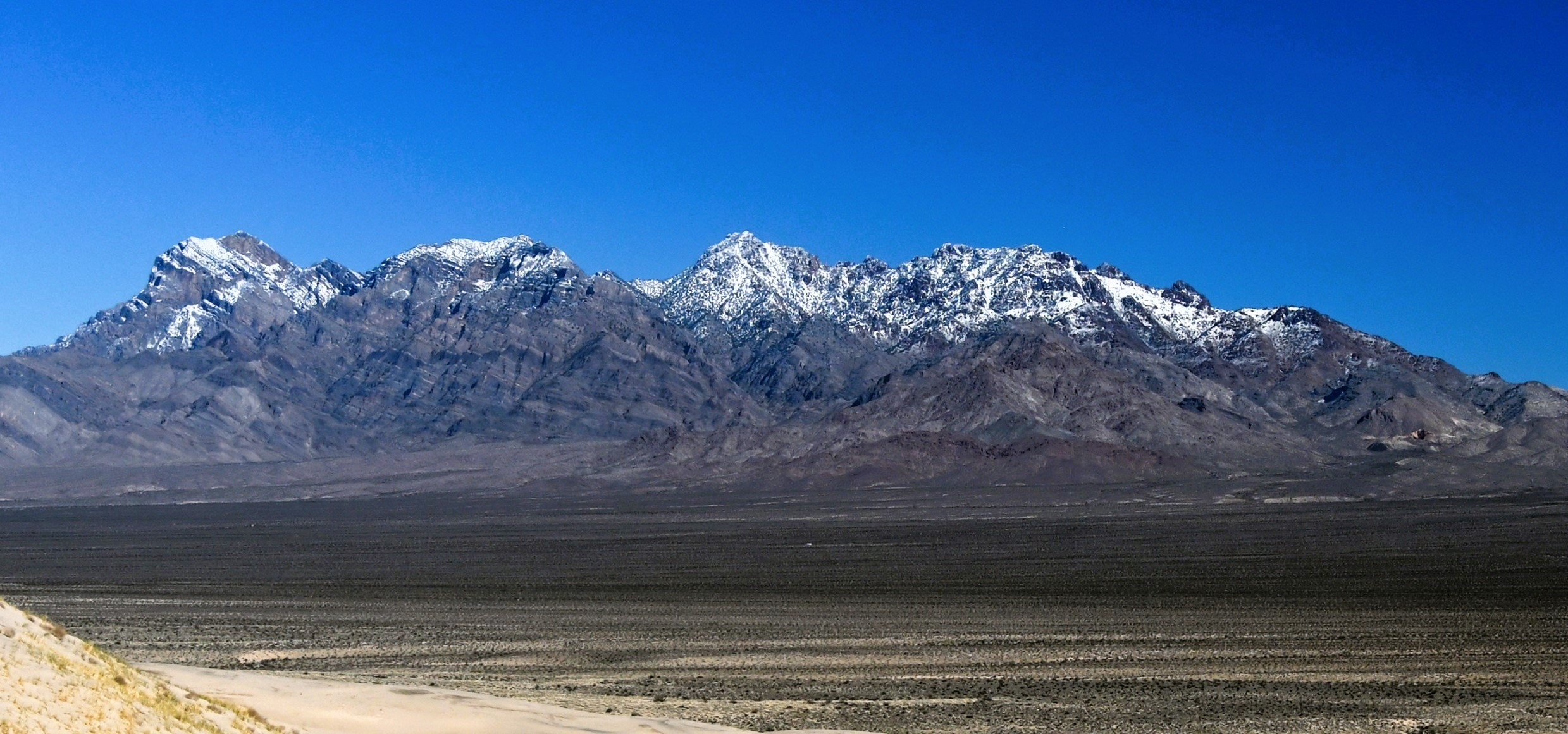
- West aspect, centered

Highest point
- Elevation: 7,162 ft (2,183 m)
- Prominence: 2,225 ft (678 m)
- Isolation: 24.53 mi (39.48 km)
- Coordinates: 34°57′20″N 115°32′11″W

Geography
- Location within California Location within the United States
- Country: United States
- State: California
- County: San Bernardino
- Protected area: Mojave National Preserve
- Parent range: Providence Mountains
- Topo map: USGS Fountain Peak

Geology
- Rock age: Jurassic
- Mountain type: Fault block
- Rock type: Rhyolite

Climbing
- Easiest route: class 2+ scrambling

Edgar Peak is a 7,162-foot-elevation (2,183-meter) summit in San Bernardino County, California, United States.

== Description ==
Edgar Peak is the highest point of the Providence Mountains and the Providence Mountains State Recreation Area. It is set within the Mojave National Preserve. Precipitation runoff from this mountain's west slope drains to Kelso Wash, whereas the east slope drains to Clipper Valley. Topographic relief is significant as the summit rises 3,160 feet (963 meters) above the surrounding terrain in 1.5 miles (2.4 km). An ascent of the summit involves 4.2 miles of strenuous off-trail hiking with 3,000 feet of elevation gain, best done in cooler months from October through May. This mountain's toponym has been officially adopted by the United States Board on Geographic Names. The mountain has also been called "Mount Edgar" in publications going back as early as 1891, and on maps of 1887.

== Climate ==
The peak is set within the Mojave Desert. According to the Köppen climate classification system, Edgar Peak has a cold desert climate, with the lower surrounding terrain in a hot desert climate zone. Temperatures average between 10 °F to 30 °F in January, and 50 °F to 100 °F in July. Typical of high deserts, summer temperatures can be exceedingly hot, while winter temperatures can be cold. Winter snowfall melts rapidly in the arid and sunny climate.

== Geology ==
Edgar Peak is composed of multiple rock formations. The top is composed of Jurassic Fountain Peak Rhyolite with a mean age of 164 Ma. The rhyolite cuts across and intrudes adjacent sedimentary units and is interpreted to represent the feeder system of an extrusive dome. The sedimentary units consist of limestone and sandstone members of the Triassic Moenkopi Formation, and the Permian Bird Spring Formation which is predominantly limestone.

== Gallery ==
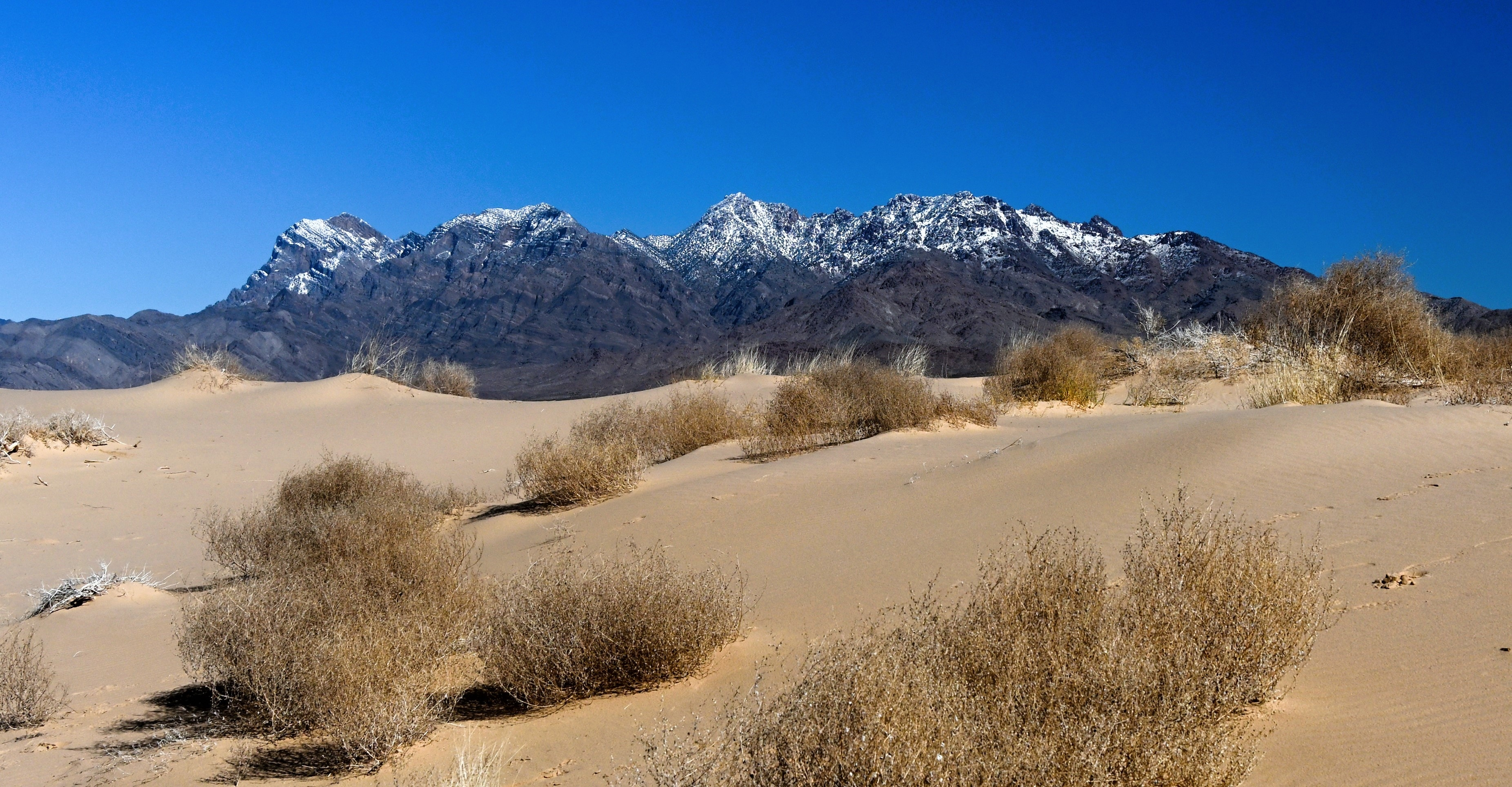
West aspect of Edgar Peak (center), viewed from Kelso Dunes

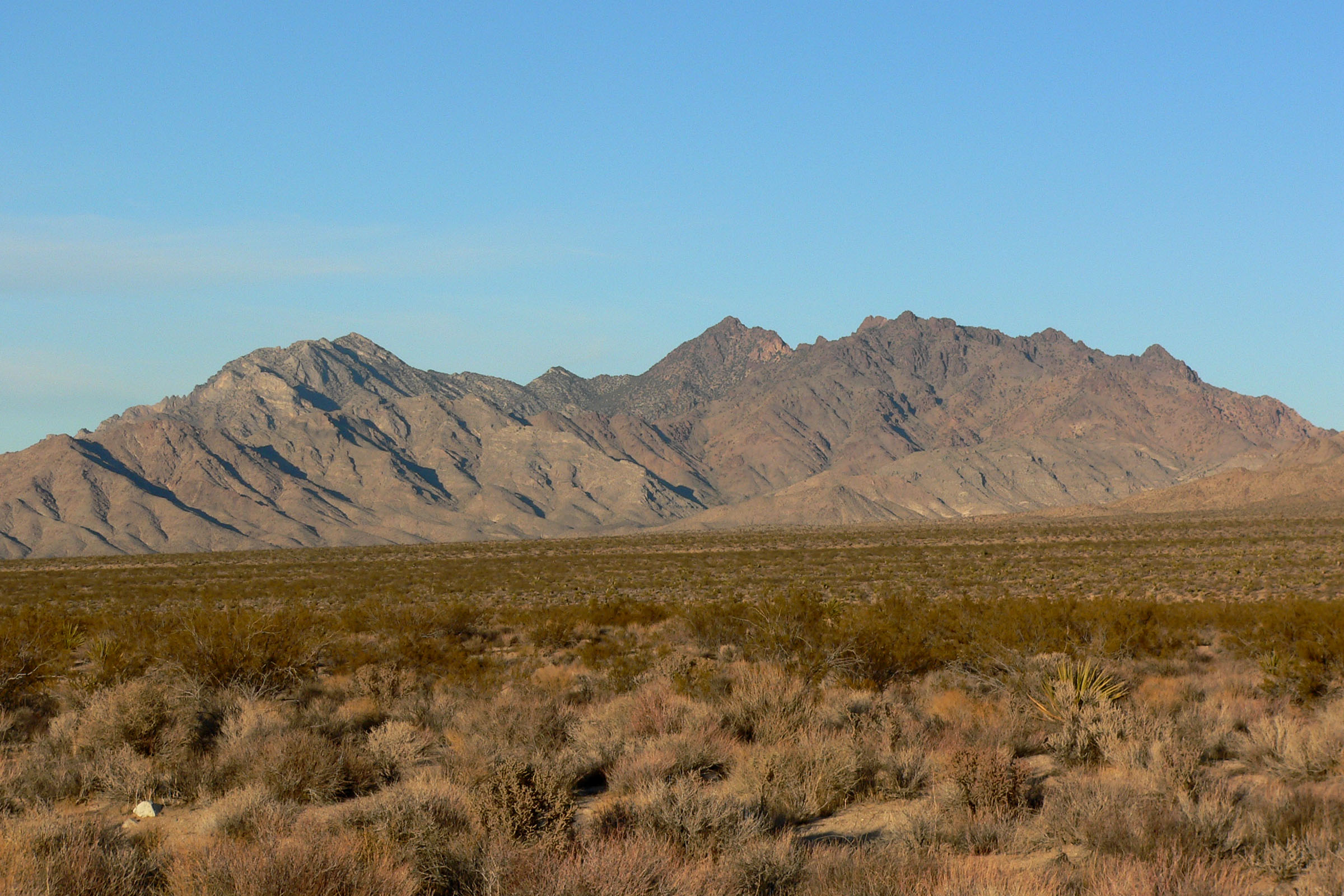
Edgar Peak centered

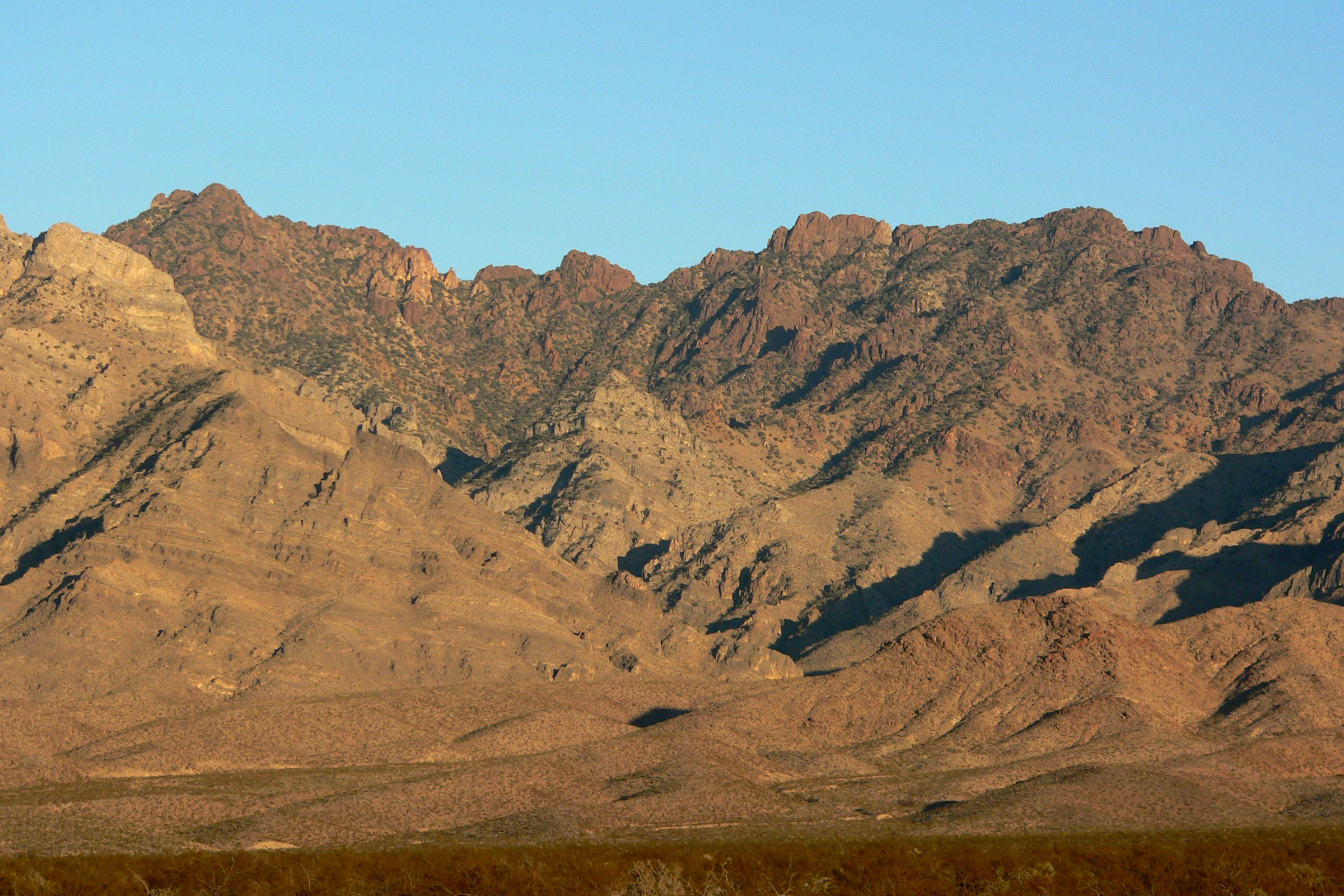
Edgar Peak (upper left, in back), Fountain Peak to right
