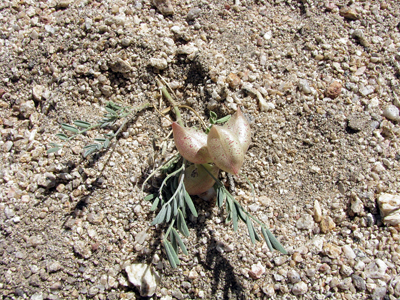

Conservation status
- Vulnerable (NatureServe)

Scientific classification
- Kingdom: Plantae
- Clade: Tracheophytes
- Clade: Angiosperms
- Clade: Eudicots
- Clade: Rosids
- Order: Fabales
- Family: Fabaceae
- Subfamily: Faboideae
- Genus: Astragalus
- Species: A. nutans

Binomial name
- Astragalus nutans M.E.Jones

Synonyms
- Astragalus chuckwallae

= Astragalus nutans =

Species of legume

Astragalus nutans is a species of milkvetch known by the common name Providence Mountains milkvetch.

== Distribution ==
It is endemic to the Mojave Desert of eastern California, where it was named for the local Providence Mountains in the Mojave National Preserve.

== Description ==
Astragalus nutans is a small annual or perennial herb growing patchlike and low to the ground or erect to a maximum height near 15 centimeters. Its leaves are a few centimeters long and are made up of several narrow oval-shaped leaflets. Stem and leaves are coated thinly in rough hairs.

The inflorescence bears 6 to 10 pinkish purple flowers with pale petal tips. The fruit is an inflated legume pod up to 2.5 centimeters long. It dries to a thin papery texture and contains many seeds in its single chamber.
