= Shadow Valley =

Valley in California, United States

Coordinates: 35°32′51″N 115°43′42″W

Shadow Valley is a north to northwest flowing drainage within the Mojave Desert of San Bernardino County, California. A section of Interstate 15 passes through the valley between Mountain Pass and Halloran Springs. The valley drains to the north from the west flank of the Mescal Range, the Ivanpah Mountains and, Cima Dome within the Mojave National Preserve. North of I-15 the valley lies between Clark Mountains to the east and Shadow Mountain to the west. To the north of Shadow Mountain, Kingman Wash becomes the main drainage and turns to the west south of the Kingston Range. The Mesquite Mountains and the Mesquite Valley are to the northeast.
