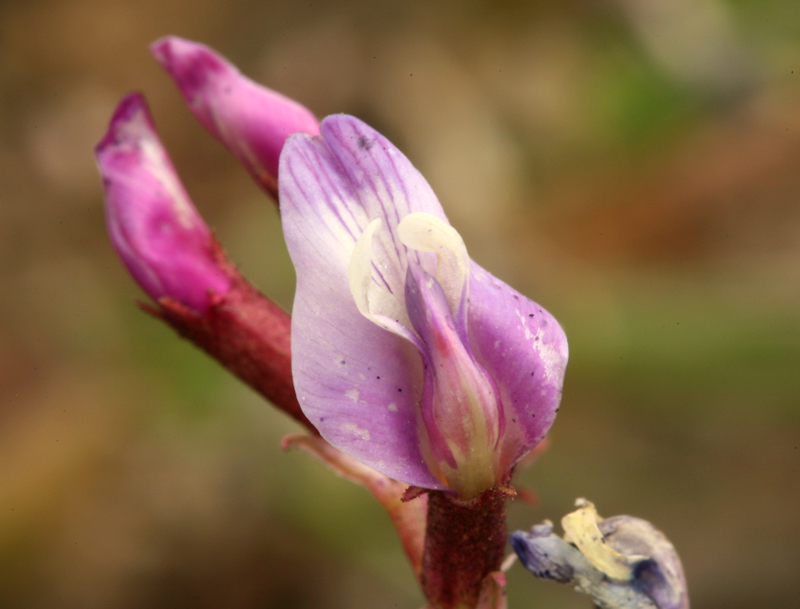
- Astragalus cimae var. cimae

Conservation status
- Vulnerable (NatureServe)

Scientific classification
- Kingdom: Plantae
- Clade: Embryophytes
- Clade: Tracheophytes
- Clade: Angiosperms
- Clade: Eudicots
- Clade: Rosids
- Order: Fabales
- Family: Fabaceae
- Subfamily: Faboideae
- Genus: Astragalus
- Species: A. cimae

Binomial name
- Astragalus cimae M.E.Jones

= Astragalus cimae =

Cima milkvetch

Species of legume

Astragalus cimae is a species of milkvetch known by the common name Cima milkvetch. It is native to the Mojave Desert and its sky island woodlands of eastern California western Nevada, especially on calcareous soils, including the Cima Dome area in the Mojave National Preserve.

== Description ==
Astragalus cimae is a spreading perennial herb with somewhat fleshy stems up to about 25 cm (9.8 in) long. Leaves are up to 11 cm (4.3 in) long and made up of oval or rounded leaflets. The plant bears an inflorescence of up to 25 flowers with reddish or pinkish purple petals sometimes tipped with white. Each flower is between 1 and 1.5 cm (0.39 and 0.59 in) long. The fruit is a legume pod with usually two inflated chambers.

Its bloom period is April to May. It has major toxicity.

The size is 0.8 to 9.8 inches tall. The flower color is pink, white, purple, or red.
