= Clipper Valley =

Alluvial plain in California, United States

Coordinates: 34°48′28″N 115°26′52″W

Clipper Valley is a vast, oval-shaped alluvial plain located in the eastern Mojave Desert, in San Bernardino County, California, in the south of the Mojave National Preserve. Interstate 40 passes the valley along its southern border, and Needles, California and the Colorado River are to the east.

== Geography ==
The Valley is north of the Clipper Mountains, southeast of the Providence Mountains, and northwest of the Sacramento Mountains. Covering over 400 square miles (1,000 km^{2}), the valley is large enough to hold most of greater Los Angeles. It has two prominent geologic features, the largest being the Blind Hills, a heavily eroded, flat-topped outcropping of rocky hills, and Halfway Hill, located near the center of the valley.

Only two small roads actually cross the valley, a small dirt road called Vulcan Mine Road, and a largely abandoned stretch of the National Old Trails Road and historic U.S. Route 66.

== History ==
The valley was part of the homeland of the Mojave people for thousands of years. The region has been the site of numerous mining operations, particularly during the 1840s Gold Rush.

The Clipper Mountain Wilderness Area is nearby in the northern Clipper Mountains.

== See also ==
- Category: Valleys of the Mojave Desert
- Category: Protected areas of San Bernardino County, California
