= Mescal Range =

Mountain range in California's Mojave Desert

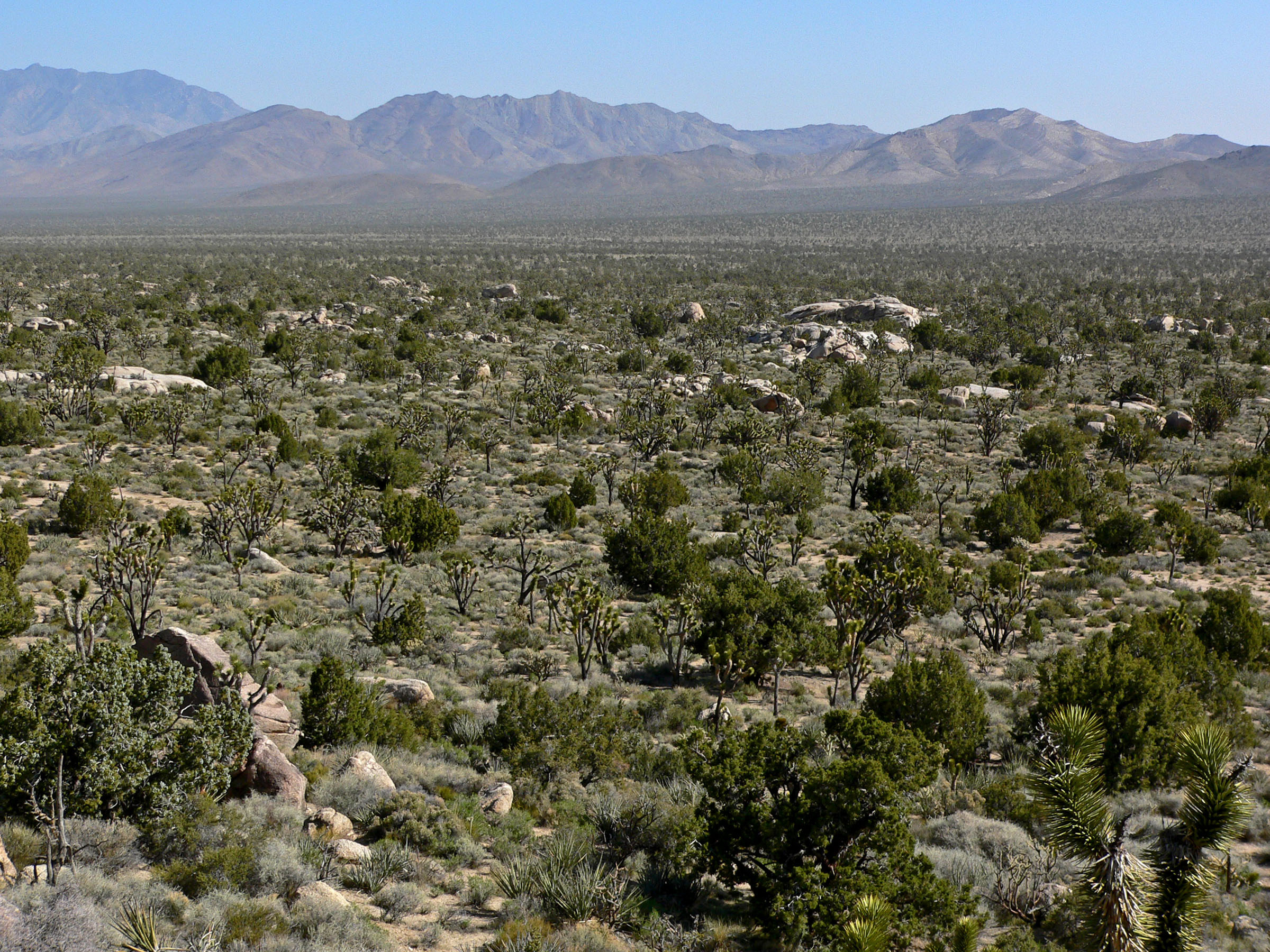
- Viewed from Cima Dome, the Mescal Range is the ridge on the horizon slightly left of center

Highest point
- Elevation: 1,981 m (6,499 ft)
- Coordinates: 35°25.908′N 115°32.780′W

Geography
- Location within California
- Country: United States
- State: California
- District: San Bernardino County
- Range coordinates: 35°26′27.938″N 115°33′7.991″W
- Topo map: USGS Mescal Range

The Mescal Range is a small mountain range in the eastern Mojave Desert in California about 12 miles from the Nevada state line.

The range lies just to the south of Interstate 15 near Mountain Pass. The Clark Mountain Range lies to the north. It lies northwest of the Ivanpah Mountains across Paiute Valley. To the west is the broad Shadow Valley. The mountains are approximately six miles long. Mines in the range include the Mollusk, Blue Buzzard and Iron Horse mines along the eastern end.
