= Clipper Mountains =

Mountain range in California, United States

- Location within California

Highest point
- Peak: Clipper Mountain
- Elevation: 4,625 ft (1,410 m)

Geography
- Country: United States
- State: California
- District: San Bernardino County
- Range coordinates: 34°45′15″N 115°24′59″W
- Topo map: USGS West of Blind Hills

The Clipper Mountains are located in the eastern Mojave Desert and protected within Mojave Trails National Monument, in San Bernardino County, California.

== Location ==
The range parallels and is just south of Interstate 40 and the Clipper Valley, between the freeway and the National Old Trails Highway - U.S. Route 66.

== Geography ==
The Clipper Mountains are southeast of the Granite Mountains and Providence Mountains, north of the Old Woman Mountains, and west of the Sacramento Mountains. They are northwest of the small communities of Essex and Goffs.

The range is home to at least three natural springs, and the 'Tom Reed Mine.'

== Clipper Mountain Wilderness ==
The Clipper Mountain Wilderness is on the northern slopes of the range, and also within Mojave Trails National Monument. It includes rugged yellow and dark brown, horizontally striped mesas; narrow canyons with hidden springs; and sparsely vegetated alluvial fans. This small cluster of volcanic mountains is oriented northeast to southwest. In the center, the most prominent ridge, Clipper Mountain, reaches an elevation of 4,625 feet (1,410 m) before it dramatically drops off in a series of sharp cliffs overlooking the Fenner and Clipper Valleys. Castle Dome, a local landmark, can be clearly seen from Historic Route 66 to the south and east.

The vegetation types are predominantly xeric desert scrub, with creosote bush (Larrea tridentata), and desert wash scrub. In the spring, the alluvial fans turn yellow with brittlebush flowers (Encelia farinosa), as well as wildflowers.

Wildlife includes a herd of 40-50 desert bighorn sheep, coyote, roadrunners, chucker, quail, prairie falcons, red-tailed hawks, golden eagles, ground squirrels, kangaroo rats, black-tailed jackrabbits, rattlesnakes, and several species of lizards. The entire wilderness is considered critical habitat for the threatened desert tortoise.

== See also ==
- Clipper Valley
- Providence Mountains State Recreation Area
- Protected areas of the Mojave Desert
- Flora of the California desert regions
- Mountain ranges of the Mojave Desert
- Camp Clipper
