= Clipper Mountain Wilderness =

Wilderness area in California, United States

- IUCN category Ib (wilderness area)
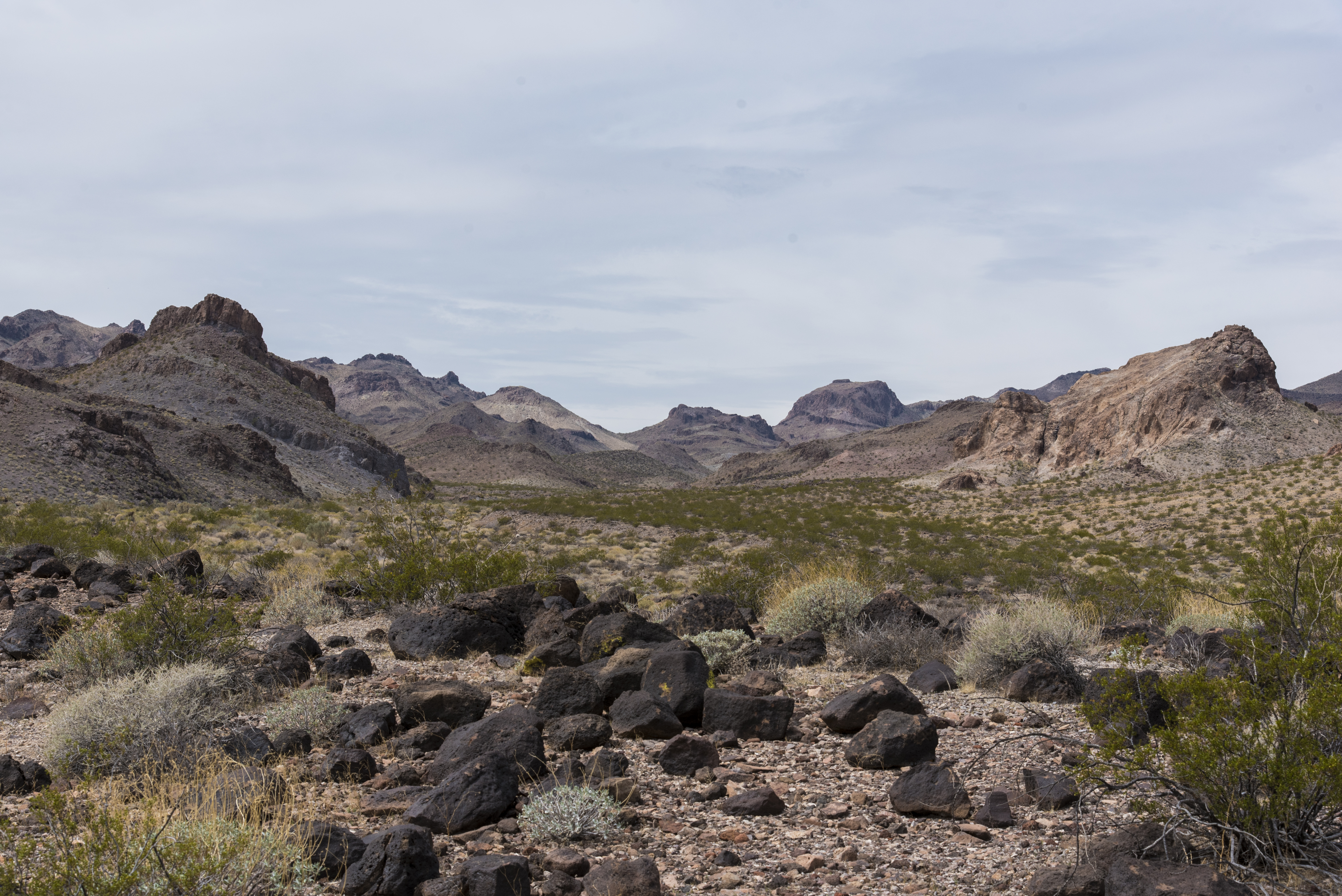

- Location within southern California Location within California Location within the United States
- Location: Mojave Trails National Monument, San Bernardino County, California
- Nearest city: Essex, California
- Coordinates: 34.73805°N 115.41759°W
- Area: 33,843 acres (13,696 ha)
- Governing body: U.S. Bureau of Land Management

The Clipper Mountain Wilderness is a wilderness area in the Clipper Mountains of the eastern Mojave Desert and within Mojave Trails National Monument, located in northeastern San Bernardino County, California. It is under the jurisdiction of the Bureau of Land Management.

== Geography ==
The 33,843-acre (13,696 ha) Clipper Mountain Wilderness is found mostly on the northern section of the Clipper Mountains, which are adjacent on the north to Interstate 40 and historic U.S. Route 66. The wilderness area is adjoining the southern National Park Service Mojave National Preserve. It is 50 miles west of Needles, California.

== Description ==
The Clipper Mountain Wilderness has rugged yellow and dark brown, horizontally striped mesas, narrow canyons with springs, and sparsely vegetated alluvial fans. The small cluster of volcanic mountains is oriented northeast to southwest. In the center, the most prominent ridge, Clipper Mountain, reaches an elevation of 4,625 feet before it dramatically drops off in series of sharp cliffs overlooking the Fenner and Clipper Valleys. Castle Dome, a local landmark, can be clearly seen from Historic Route 66.

== Natural history ==
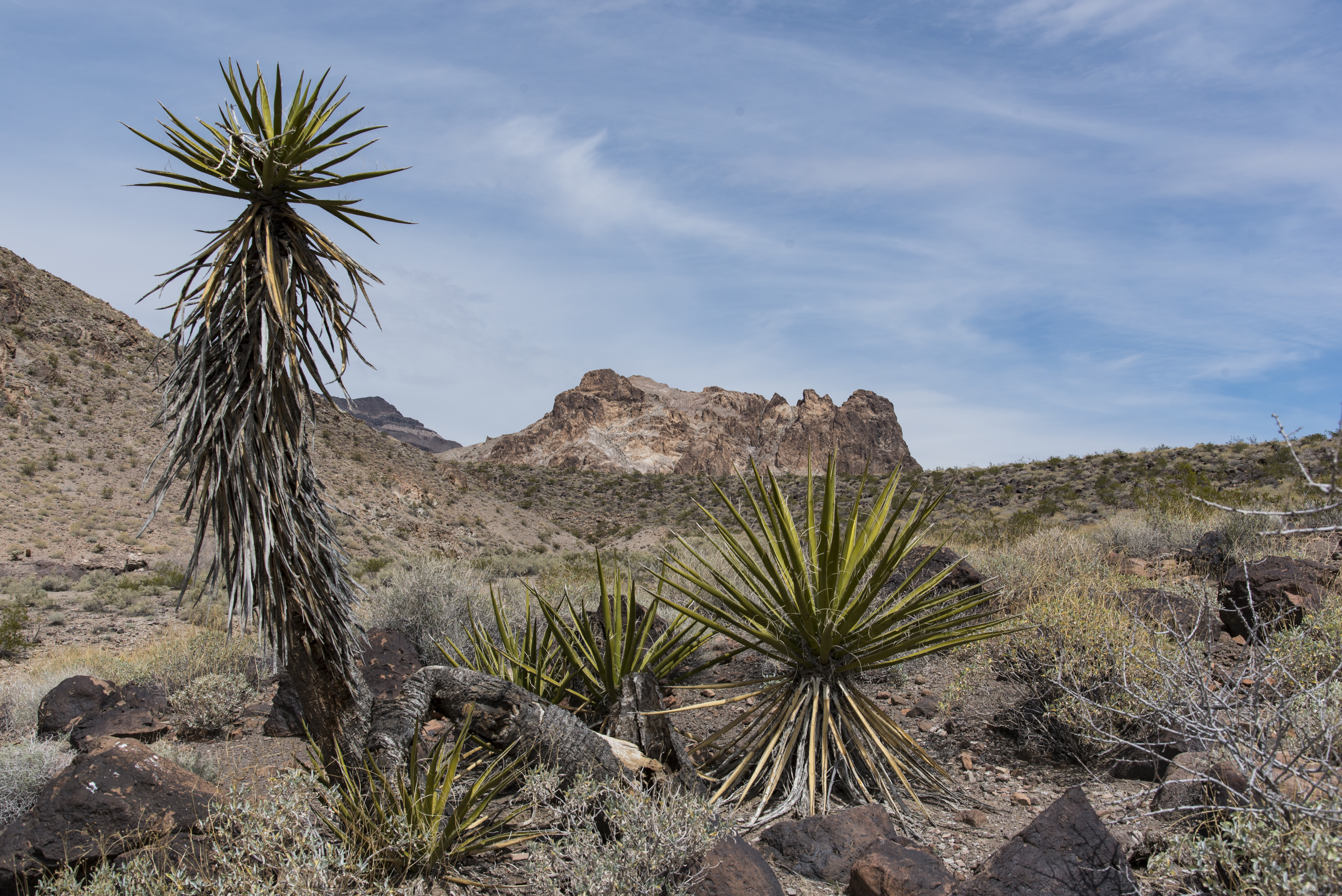

=== Flora ===
See: Category: Flora of the California desert regions

The plant community vegetation types here are predominantly Creosote bush (Larrea tridentata) xeric desert scrub and desert wash scrub habitats. In the spring, the alluvial fans turn yellow with Brittlebush - Encelia farinosa and other desert wildflowers.

=== Fauna ===
See: Category: Fauna of the Mojave Desert

Wildlife in the wilderness area is typical for the Mojave Desert; including a herd of 40-50 desert bighorn sheep, coyotes, black-tailed jackrabbits, Mohave ground squirrels, kangaroo rats, greater roadrunners, chukar, quail, prairie falcons, red-tailed hawks, golden eagles, rattlesnakes, and several species of lizards including the zebra-tailed lizard. The entire wilderness is considered critical habitat for the threatened desert tortoise.

== See also ==
- Mojave Trails National Monument
- Mojave National Preserve
