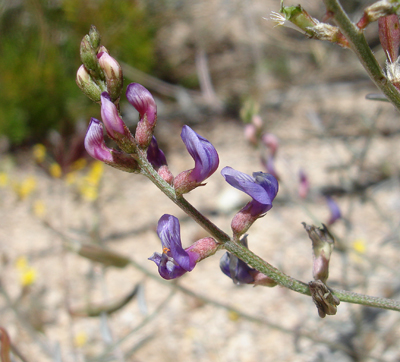

Conservation status
- Vulnerable (NatureServe)

Scientific classification
- Kingdom: Plantae
- Clade: Embryophytes
- Clade: Tracheophytes
- Clade: Angiosperms
- Clade: Eudicots
- Clade: Rosids
- Order: Fabales
- Family: Fabaceae
- Subfamily: Faboideae
- Genus: Astragalus
- Species: A. bernardinus

Binomial name
- Astragalus bernardinus M.E.Jones

= Astragalus bernardinus =

San Bernardino milkvetch

Species of legume

Astragalus bernardinus, known by the common name San Bernardino milkvetch or the Lesser Three-keeled Milkvetch, is a species of milkvetch. It is a plant of desert and dry mountain slope habitat. It is native to California.

== Distribution and Habitat ==
The plant is native to the San Bernardino Mountains of Southern California. It is also found in the Mojave Desert sky islands, in the Ivanpah Mountains and nearby New York Mountains which straddle the California—Nevada state line.

It lives in the communities of Pinyon-Juniper Woodland and Joshua Tree Woodland. It is threatened in California.

It has a rank of G3, which means it is vulnerable.

== Description ==
Astragalus bernardinus is a slender, wiry perennial herb growing in twisted clumps, sometimes clinging to other plants for support. The stems are 10 to 50 centimeters long and mostly naked, coated partly in stiff hairs. The leaves are up to 14 centimeters long and are made up of widely spaced pairs of lance-shaped leaflets. The inflorescence is a loose cluster of up to 25 light purple pealike flowers. The fruit is a pale-colored legume pod up to 3 centimeters long which dries to a papery texture. The bloom colors are White, Pink, Blue, Purple, or Violet.

Its bloom period is through April, May, and June. It has major toxicity, which probably comes from eating it. It is found in the elevations of 900-2300 meters.
