= Mid Hills =

- Location within California

Highest point
- Elevation: 4,865 ft (1,483 m)

Geography
- Country: United States
- State: California
- Region: Mojave Desert
- District(s): Mojave National Preserve, San Bernardino County
- Range coordinates: 35°9′26.960″N 115°26′9.966″W
- Topo map: USGS Mid Hills

The Mid Hills are a low mountain range in the Mojave Desert, in San Bernardino County, California.

The Mid Hills are located entirely within Mojave National Preserve. They are northeast of Kelso and the park's visitor center, and southeast of Cima Dome & Volcanic Field. At the southeast end are the Little Thorne Mountains.
