= Aiken's Wash =

Archaeological site in California, United States

- Aiken's Wash National Register District
- U.S. National Register of Historic Places
- U.S. Historic district
- Location within California Location within the United States
- Nearest city: Baker, California
- Coordinates: 35°14′22″N 115°44′55″W
- Area: 1,450 acres (590 ha)
- NRHP reference No.: 82002239
- Added to NRHP: May 24, 1982

Aiken's Wash is an archaeologically and geologically significant wash located in the Mojave National Preserve in San Bernardino County, California. The wash includes several pictograph and petroglyph sites dating from the late pre-Columbian period. The proximity of pictographs and petroglyphs is unusual in the Mojave Desert region. The area was added to the National Register of Historic Places as the Aiken's Wash National Register District. The district comprises 1,450 acres (590 ha), including all major archaeological sites in the wash.

== Description ==
The two largest rock art groupings are at Aiken's Arch and Milky Way Caves; other prominent groupings are at Aiken's Cove, Aiken's Tank, Metate Cliff, Shadow Cave, and The Dikes. Patterns depicted in the petroglyphs include anthropomorphs, circles and curves, grids and lattices, and occasional zoomorphs or phytomorphs; the pictographs, which mainly use red dye, show similar patterns.

The wash also includes multiple pre-Columbian habitation sites. Three rockshelters have been found in the wash; all are associated with rock art sites. In addition, a house site has been discovered near Aiken's Arch; the site includes multiple round house rings.

== Geology ==
The wash is also one of the most significant volcano sites in the Mojave Desert. The site includes multiple extinct cinder cones and volcanic flow areas. The volcanoes originally date from two periods; one set emerged in the early Pleistocene, while the other came about in the late Pleistocene or Holocene. The most recent volcanic activity in the region most likely occurred between 800 and 1000 years ago.
