= Ethmia geranella =

Scientific classification
- Domain: Eukaryota
- Kingdom: Animalia
- Phylum: Arthropoda
- Class: Insecta
- Order: Lepidoptera
- Family: Depressariidae
- Genus: Ethmia
- Species: E. geranella

Binomial name
- Ethmia geranella Barnes & Busck, 1920

Species of moth

Ethmia geranella is a moth in the family Depressariidae first described by William Barnes and August Busck in 1920. It is known only from the United States in the western edge of the Colorado Desert in California's San Diego County and the Ivanpah Mountains of the eastern Mojave Desert.

The length of the forewings is about 10.4 mm (0.41 in). The ground color of the forewings is whitish, more or less uniformly irrorated (speckled) with scattered brown scales. The ground color of the hindwings is uniform pale brownish. Adults have been recorded in October.

The larvae probably feed on Phacelia species.
