= Vontrigger Hills =

Mountain range in Southern California

- Location within California Location within the United States

Highest point
- Elevation: 4,003 ft (1,220 m)

Geography
- Country: United States
- State: California
- Region: Mojave Desert
- District(s): Mojave National Preserve, San Bernardino County
- Range coordinates: 35°3′54.981″N 115°6′59.927″W
- Topo map: USGS Signal Hill

The Vontrigger Hills are a low mountain range in the eastern Mojave Desert, in eastern San Bernardino County, California.

Vontrigger Hills are located in the southeastern Mojave National Preserve, approximately 10 miles (16 km) north of the small settlement of Goffs, California that's on U.S. Route 66.
