= Little Thorne Mountains =

Mountain range in California, United States

- Location within California

Highest point
- Elevation: 1,784 m (5,853 ft)

Geography
- Country: United States
- State: California
- District: San Bernardino County
- Range coordinates: 35°5′5.76″N 115°26′7.07″W
- Topo map: USGS Columbia Mountain

The Little Thorne Mountains are a small mountain range near the center of Mojave National Preserve in the Mojave Desert in San Bernardino County, California. They are southeast of Mid Hills, east of Columbia Mountain, and northeast of the Providence Mountains, 13 miles northeast of Kelso. The highest point is 5853 feet.
