= Mitchell Caverns =

Caves in California, United States

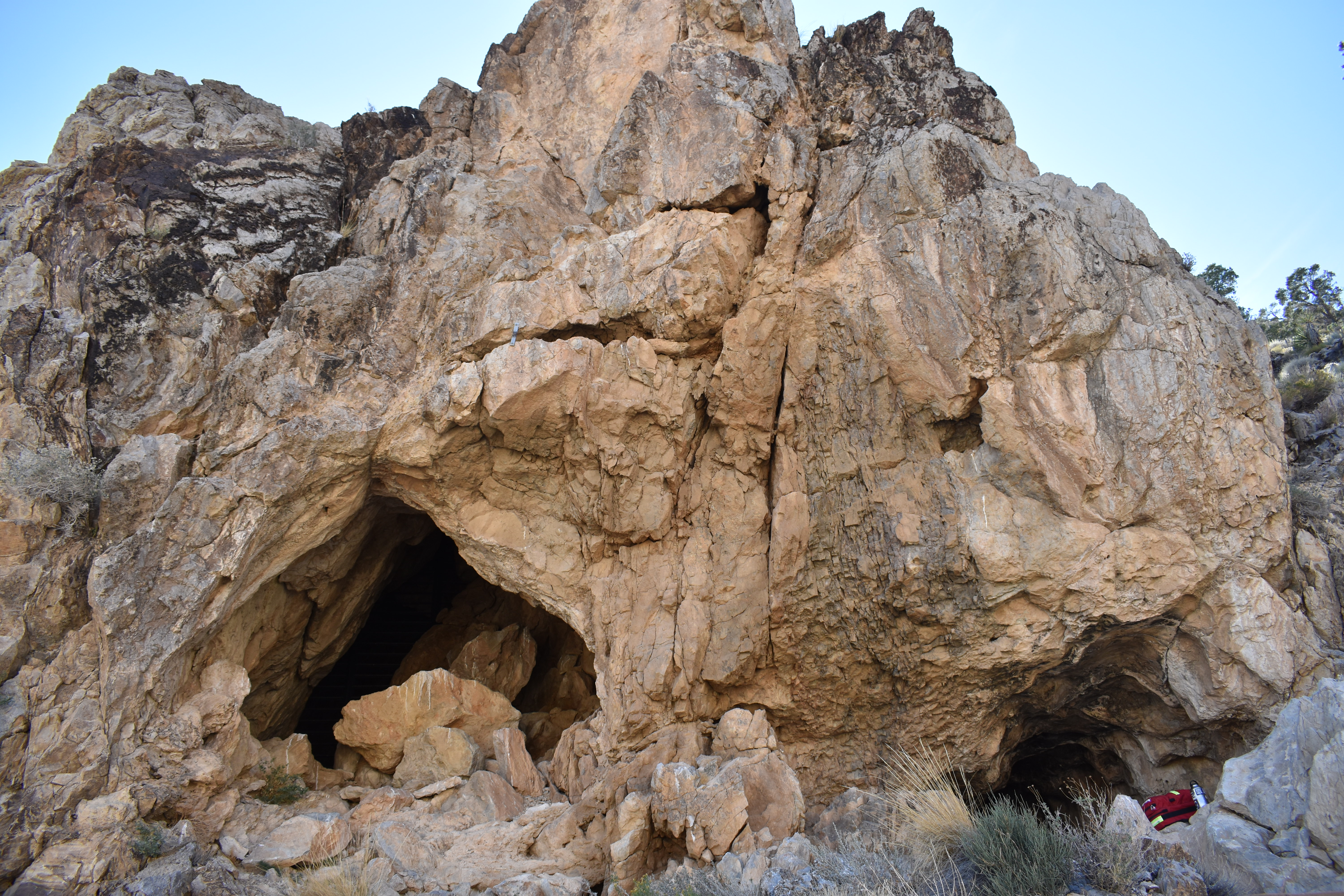

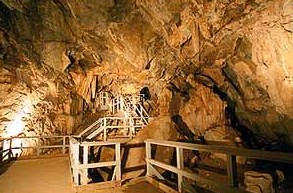

- Location within California Location within the United States
- Location: San Bernardino County, California, United States
- Coordinates: 34°56′27″N 115°30′52″W
- Elevation: 4,300 feet (1,300 m)
- Geology: Permian limestone
- Access: Show cave, open Fri-Sun
- Visitors: 15 people per tour
- Website: http://www.parks.ca.gov/?page_id=615

U.S. National Natural Landmark
- Designated: 1975

The Mitchell Caverns, within the Mitchell Caverns Natural Preserve, are three solutional limestone caves, only two of which are open to the public, located on the east side of the Providence Mountains at an elevation of 4,300 feet (1,300 m), within the Providence Mountains State Recreation Area. The caverns are located in the Mojave Desert, in San Bernardino County, California, United States.

== Geology ==
The caves lie within a thick sequence of marine Permian limestone. They were formed before the Pleistocene epoch, when ground water with a high carbonic acid content ate into the surrounding sedimentary limestone. Stalactites, stalagmites, and other cave formations were formed from calcium carbonate left by dripping mineral water.

== History ==
Numerous paleontology and archaeological finds have been made in and around the caverns. Scientists have found the remains of several prehistoric animals, including a Shasta ground sloth. The caverns were a special place for the Chemehuevi Indians, and a number of tools and material culture have been found. The Chemehuevi knew the caves as "the eyes of the mountain" due to their easily spotted dual entrances located on the side of the mountain.

The caverns are named after Jack and Ida Mitchell, who owned and operated the caves from 1934 to 1954 as a tourist attraction and rest stop for travelers on nearby U.S. Route 66. The Mitchells also held mining rights to the area and dug several prospect holes and tunnels, some of which are still visible.

The area became a state park in 1956. The surrounding lands became a part of the National Park Service Mojave National Preserve in 1994, but the caves are still owned and operated by the state of California.

== Cavern tours ==
The "Tecopa" and "El Pakiva" caves are connected by a man-made tunnel and are open to guided tours led by California State Park rangers. These caves are the only limestone caves in the California State Park system.

According to a California tourism guide, “You enter the limestone caverns at an altitude of 4,300 feet (1,300 m) about 1,000 feet (300 m) above the desert floor. The higher view of the desert from the Visitor Center is magnificent…Not too spacious, these chambers contain strangely beautiful cave coral, stalactites, and stalagmites.”

2011-2017 closure

In January 2011, due to California's budget crisis, all tours were suspended and the Providence Mountains State Recreation Area closed. Vandalism plagued the caverns' visitor center and installations after their closure.

Over a long period, major infrastructure upgrades took place. Mitchell Caverns and Providence Mountains SRA reopened, and the caverns resumed tours, on November 3, 2017, after being closed for nearly seven years.

== See also ==
- Providence Mountains State Recreation Area
- Mojave National Preserve
