= Providence Mountains State Recreation Area =

Recreation Area in California

Coordinates: 34°56′50″N 115°30′29″W

The Providence Mountains State Recreation Area is located in the Providence Mountains, within the Mojave National Preserve in San Bernardino County, California. It is also home to the Mitchell Caverns Natural Preserve.

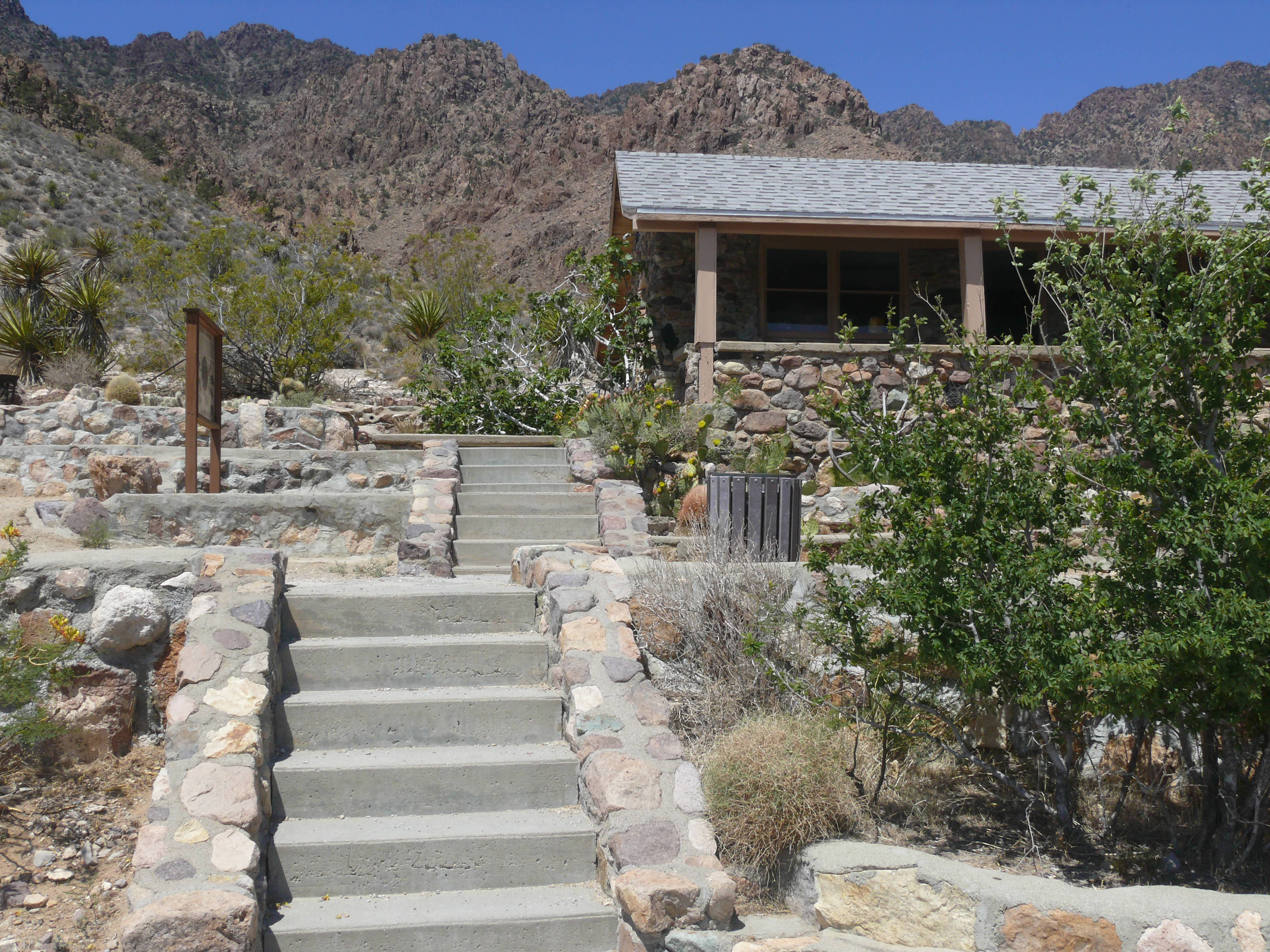
Providence Visitor Center

== Geography ==
The Recreation Area is located on the east side of the Providence Mountain range and has dramatic views of the surrounding Mojave Desert.

On approaching the Providence Mountains State Recreation Area one can see layers of tilted grey rock that are ancient limestone formed during the Paleozoic Era. The base elevation of the park is 4,300 feet with the Providence Mountains reaching 7,162 feet on Edgar Peak.

== Flora ==
Vegetation on the lower parts of the mountains is xeric shrublands scrub habitat, composed of creosote bush (Larrea tridentata), California barrel cactus (Ferocactus cylindraceus), and Mojave yucca (Yucca schidigera).

The habitat dramatically shifts with elevations above 4000 feet to a sky island where numerous animals and plants flourish in the added moisture caught by the mountains. The plant habitat includes forests of single-leaf pinyon (Pinus monophylla) and California juniper (Juniperus californica), and remnant chaparral and woodlands with oaks (Quercus turbinella) and manzanita in these higher parts of the mountains.

Mitchell Caverns is home to two endemic species of insects found nowhere else.

== Access ==
The Providence Mountains State Recreation Area is located at the north-western end of Essex Road, off of Interstate 40 (the Needles Freeway). The visitor center is located in a historic 1934 stone dwelling. The campground is currently closed.

=== Closure ===
Providence Mountain Recreation Area was one of the 48 California State Parks proposed for closure in January 2008 by California's Governor Arnold Schwarzenegger as part of a deficit reduction program. It closed temporarily in January 2011.

=== Reopening ===
Providence Mountains State Recreation Area and Mitchell Caverns reopened on November 3, 2017, after being closed for nearly seven years due to major infrastructure upgrades.

== See also ==
- Mitchell Caverns Natural Preserve
- Mojave National Preserve
