= Providence Mountains =

Peaks in Mojave Desert, California

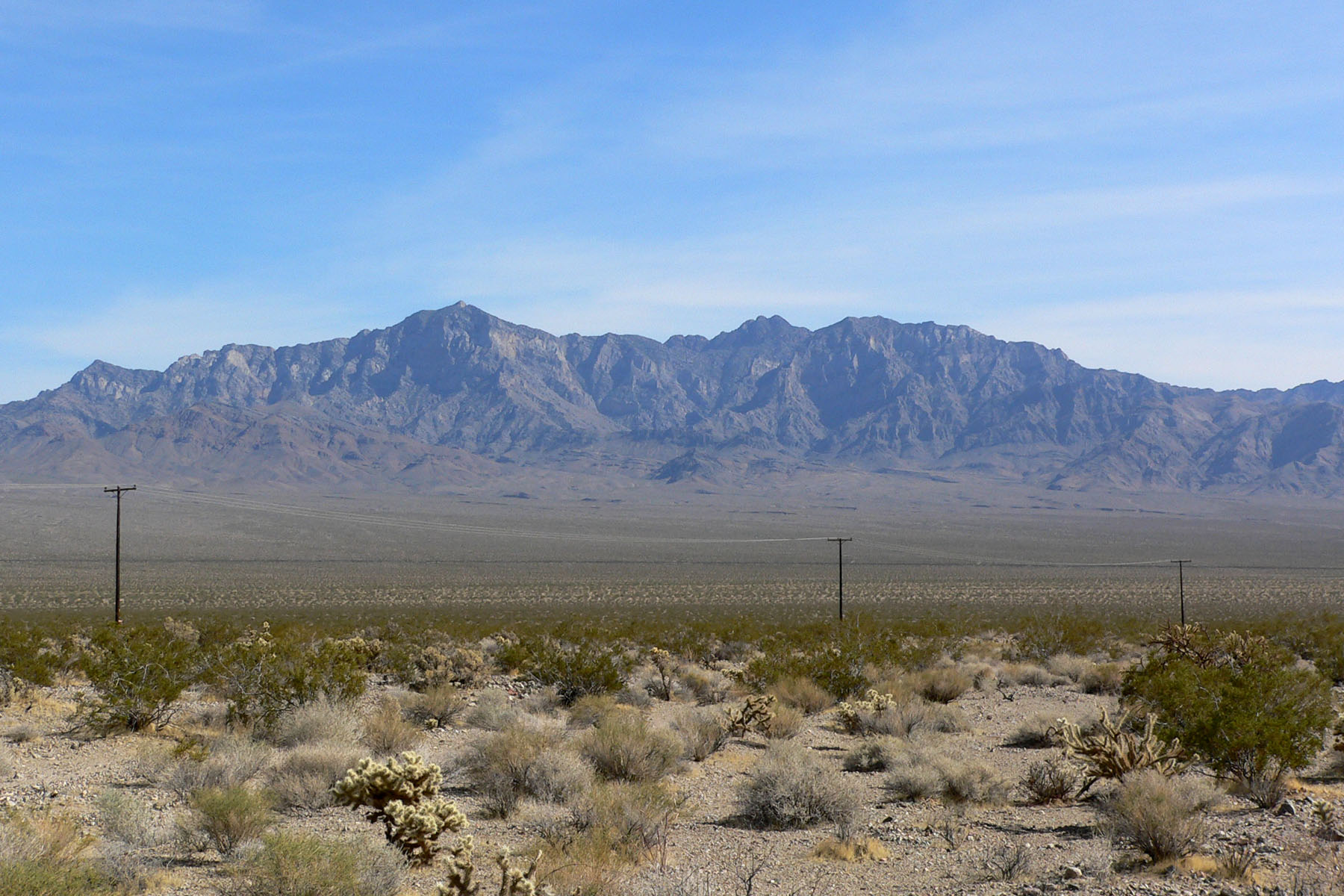
- Providence Mountains from the north

Highest point
- Peak: Edgar Peak
- Elevation: 7,162 ft (2,183 m)

Geography
- Location within California
- Country: United States
- State: California
- Region(s): Mojave National Preserve (Mojave Desert)
- District: San Bernardino County
- Range coordinates: 35°1′49″N 115°31′41″W
- Topo map: USGS Hayden

The Providence Mountains are found in the eastern Mojave Desert of San Bernardino County, California, U.S. The range reaches an elevation of 7,162 feet (2,183 m) at Edgar Peak and is home to the Mitchell Caverns Natural Preserve in the Providence Mountains State Recreation Area, and the Mojave National Preserve.

== Geography ==
The Providence Mountains are north of Interstate 40. The Little Thorne Mountains are to the northeast. The Clipper Mountains are to the southeast, and the Granite Mountains, Pisgah Crater and the Bullion Mountains are to the southwest. The Providence Mountains lie east of the small community of Kelso, east of Ludlow, and northwest of Essex and Goffs.

== Natural history ==
Vegetation on the lower parts of the mountains is xeric shrublands scrub habitat, composed of Creosote bush (Larrea tridentata), California Barrel Cactus (Ferocactus cylindraceus), Joshua trees (Yucca brevifolia), and Mojave yucca (Yucca schidigera).

The habitat dramatically shifts with elevations above 4000 feet to a sky island where numerous animals and plants flourish in the added moisture caught by the mountains. The plant habitat includes forests of Single-leaf Pinyon (Pinus monophylla) and California Juniper (Juniperus californica), and remnant chaparral and woodlands with Oaks (Quercus turbinella) and Manzanita in these higher parts of the mountains. Mitchell Caverns is home to two endemic species of insects, found nowhere else.

== History ==
The mountains were part of the homeland of the Mojave people for thousands of years.

The late 18th century Spanish explorer and missionary Francisco Garcés crossed the Las Californias Mojave Desert territory after leaving the 1774 Juan Bautista de Anza Expedition from Sonora, to Monterey Bay in Alta California. Garces traveled up the Colorado River to the land of the Mohave then traveled with a party of them across the Mojave Desert to Alta California and referred to the Providence and New York Mountains together as the Sierra de Santa Coleta, as considering them one mountain range from western Van Winkle Mountain (California) to eastern Crescent Peak (Nevada) is conceivable. Francisco Garcés crossed through Cedar Canyon, a pass between the New York and Providence Mountains on the Mohave Trail.

19th century pioneer travelers on the Mojave Road found springs and streams in the mountains and "thanked Divine Providence," resulting in the range receiving the present name. Silver was found and the Rock Springs Mining District was established in April 1863 and the Macedonia Mining District in September 1864. Mining in several areas has continued off and on for over a century. The range became part of the Mojave National Preserve in 1994, under National Park Service conservation and recreation direction.

== See also ==
- Kelso Depot, Restaurant and Employees Hotel
- Category: Mojave National Preserve
- Category: Mountain ranges of the Mojave Desert
- Category: Protected areas of the Mojave Desert
- Category: Flora of the California desert regions
