= Clark Mountain Range =

Mountain range in California

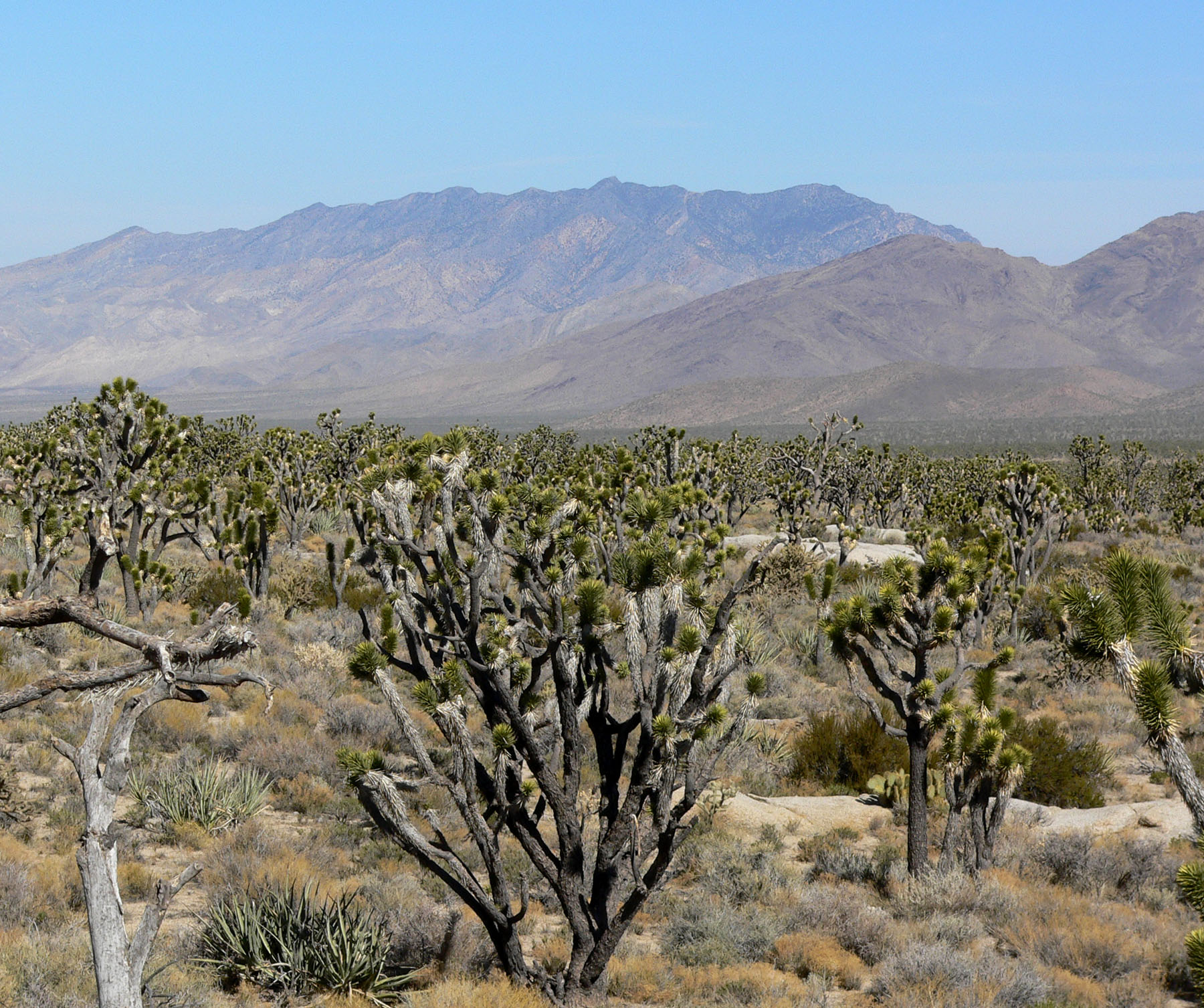
- The entire range is visible on the skyline seen from Cima Dome to the southwest.

Highest point
- Elevation: 2,418 m (7,933 ft)

Geography
- Location within California
- Country: United States
- State: California
- District: San Bernardino County
- Range coordinates: 35°34′54.929″N 115°33′24.998″W
- Topo map: USGS Clark Mountain

The Clark Mountain Range is located in southeastern California, north of Interstate 15 and the community of Mountain Pass. The range stretches approximately 15 miles (24 km) in a southwest-northeasterly direction, beginning in the Mojave National Preserve, and ending near Stateline Pass, about one mile (1.6 km) from the Nevada border. Clark Mountain, at 7,929 feet (2,417 m) above sea level, is the principal peak of the range.

The foothills of the range are in creosote scrub and Joshua tree forests, which adjoin the dense Joshua tree woodlands atop Cima Dome. Higher up, pinyon pine and juniper grow on the "sky island" which occasional rains create above 6,000 feet (1,800 m). The north side of the crest contains a small forest of white fir trees, which is extremely difficult to reach. Clark Mountain is one of three mountain areas where these rare trees persist; Kingston and New York Mountains are the other two areas where the Rocky Mountain white fir – Abies concolor can be found in California.

Interstate 15 traverses the mountain pass between the Clark Range and the Mescal Range to the south. The small town of Mountain Pass is located just south of the range on the north side of I-15. The Mountain Pass rare earth mine owned by Molycorp Minerals is a recently reactivated rare earth element mine on the southern flank of the mountain. A major mine expansion project began in January 2011.

The range contains Keany Pass and the Umberei Mine.

== See also ==
- Cima Dome & Volcanic Field National Natural Landmark
- Mojave National Preserve
