= Aikens Arch =

Coordinates: 35.2415°N 115.7446°W

Aikens Arch is a natural arch in the U.S. state of California. It is located in San Bernardino County.
