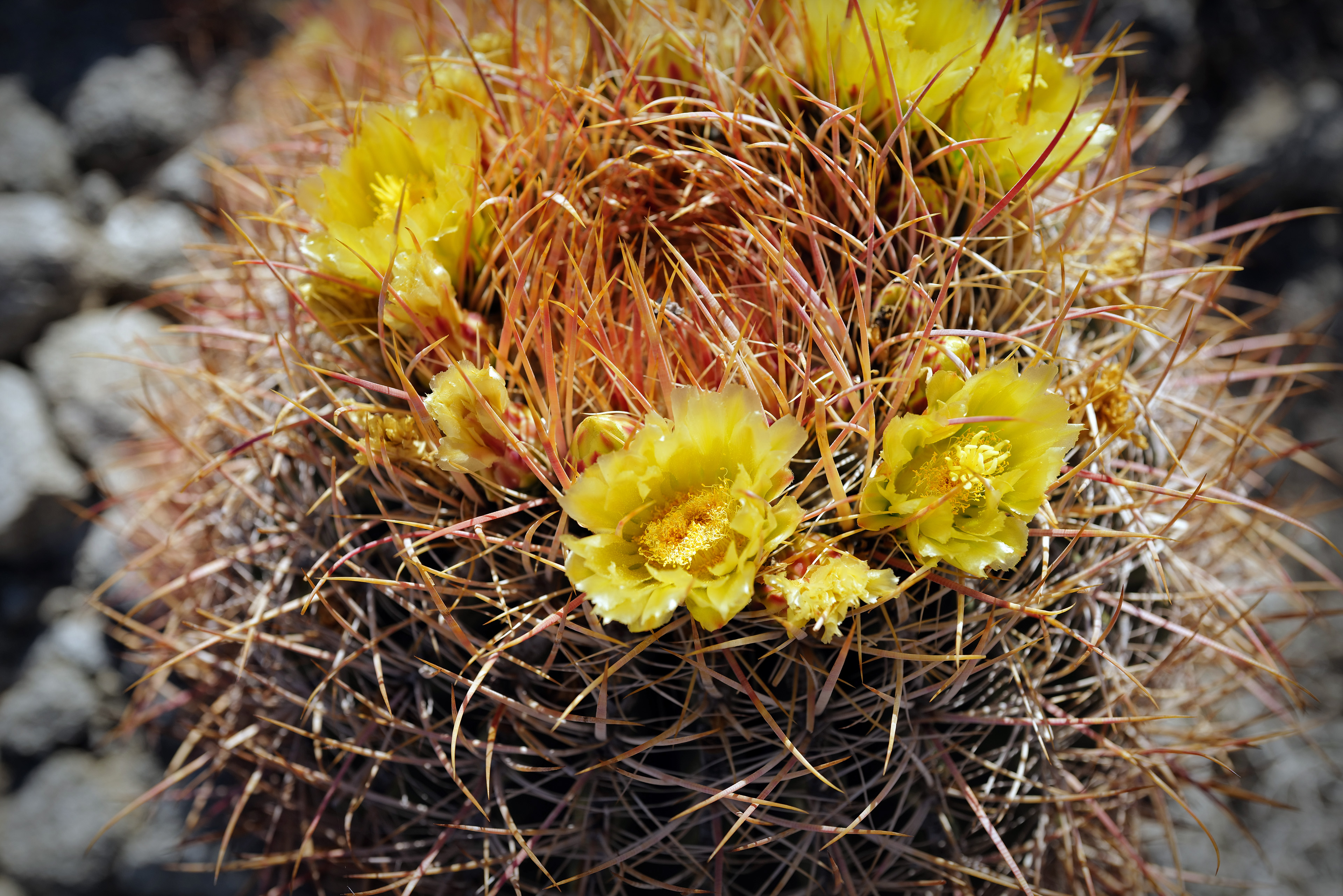

Conservation status
- Least Concern (IUCN 3.1)

- Secure (NatureServe)

Scientific classification
- Kingdom: Plantae
- Clade: Tracheophytes
- Clade: Angiosperms
- Clade: Eudicots
- Order: Caryophyllales
- Family: Cactaceae
- Subfamily: Cactoideae
- Genus: Ferocactus
- Species: F. cylindraceus

Binomial name
- Ferocactus cylindraceus (Engelm.) Orcutt

Synonyms
- Echinocactus viridescens var. cylindraceus Engelm. Echinocactus cylindraceus (Engelm.) Engelm. Echinocactus acanthodes Lem. (rejected name)

= Ferocactus cylindraceus =

Species of cactus

Ferocactus cylindraceus is a species of barrel cactus which is known by several common names, including California barrel cactus, Desert barrel cactus, compass barrel cactus, and miner's compass. It was first described by George Engelmann in 1853.

== Description ==
Ferocactus cylindraceus is usually cylindrical or spherical, usually found in clusters with some older specimens forming columns grow up to 50 cm (20 in) in diameter and 3 metres (9.8 ft) in height. The stem has 18 to 27 distinct ribs and is covered in long, plentiful spines, which are straight and red when new and become curved and gray as they age. Each areola typically contains four to seven central spines that are 5 to 15 cm (2.0 to 5.9 in) long, as well as 15 to 25 radial spines resembling strong hairs.

The cactus bears funnel-shaped flowers that are maroon outside, and bright yellow inside, with red tints and yellow centers on the side that faces the sun, measuring 3 to 6 cm (1.2 to 2.4 in) in length and 4 to 6 cm (1.6 to 2.4 in) in diameter. The fleshy, hollow fruits are spherical, yellow, and about 3 cm (1.2 in) long.

=== Subspecies ===
Accepted Subspecies:

Image	Subspecies	Distribution
	Ferocactus cylindraceus cylindraceus— California barrel cactus.	Southern California to Southwest Utah and Mexico
	Ferocactus cylindraceus lecontei (Engelm.) N.P.Taylor — Leconte's barrel cactus.	Central Arizona
	Ferocactus cylindraceus tortulispinus (H.E.Gates) N.P.Taylor	Southeast California to South Nevada and Mexico (Northwest Sonora)

== Distribution and habitat ==
This cactus is native to the eastern Mojave Desert and western Sonoran Desert Ecoregions in: Southern California, Nevada, Arizona, and Utah in the Southwestern United States; and Baja California, and Sonora state in Northwestern Mexico.

It is found in gravelly, rocky, or sandy soils, in Creosote Bush Scrub and Joshua Tree Woodland habitats, from 60–1,500 metres (200–4,920 ft) in elevation.

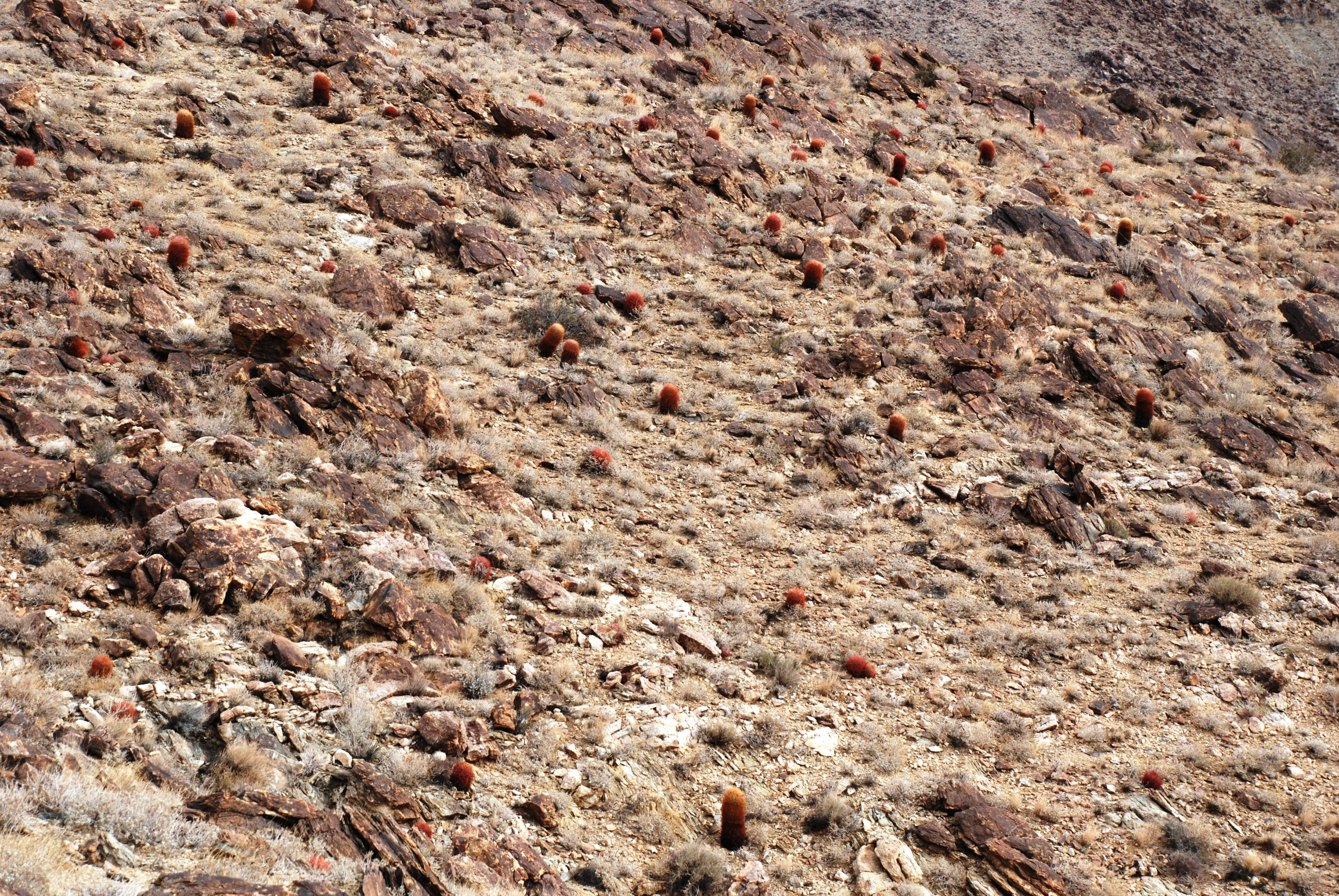
Hillside with many Ferocactus cylindraceus, in Joshua Tree National Park.

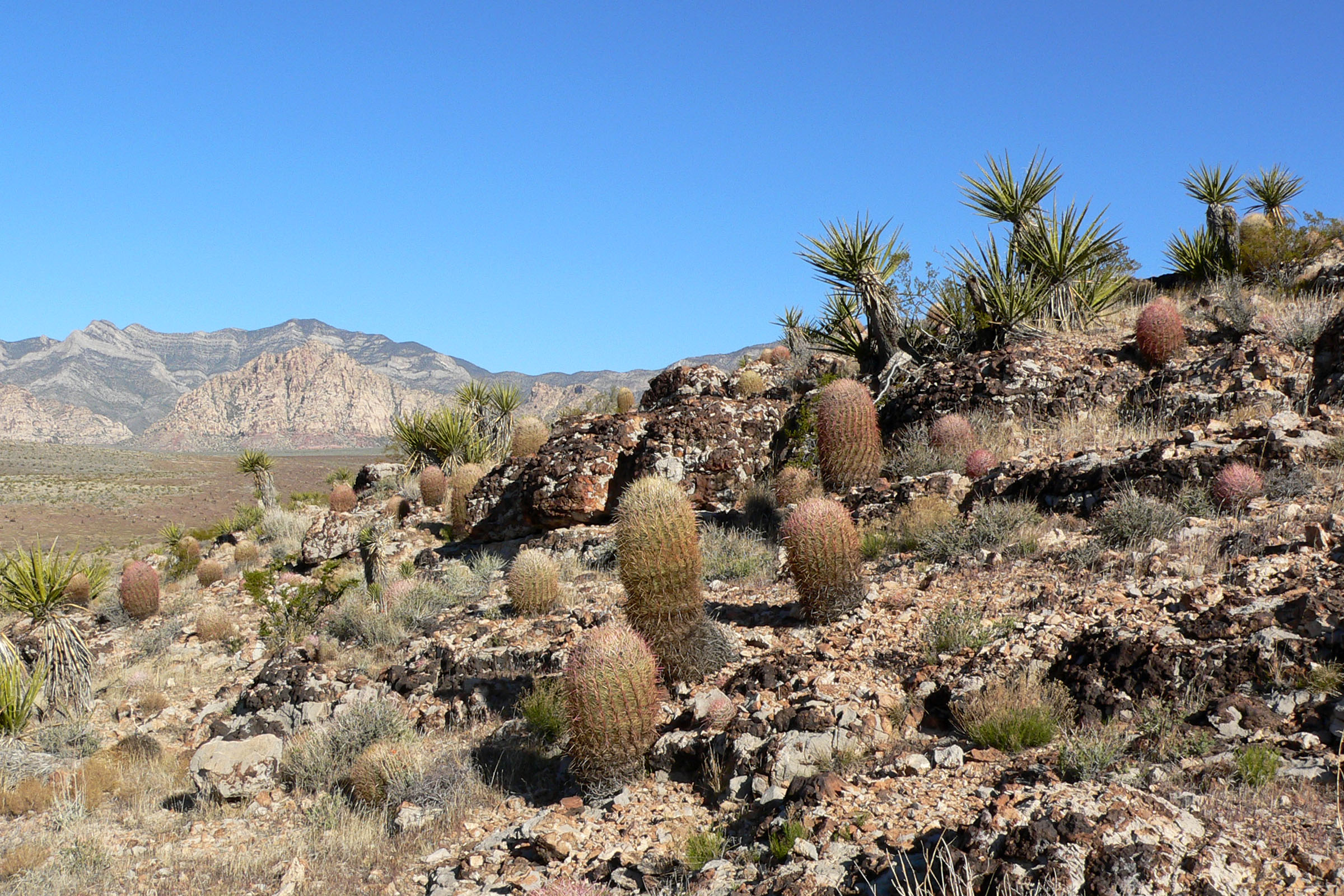
Ferocactus cylindraceus in habitat in Red Rock Canyon, Spring Mountains, southern Nevada

== Taxonomy ==
In 1852, George Engelmann first described Ferocactus cylindraceus as Echinocactus viridescens var. cylindraceus. The name "cylindraceus" is derived from Latin, meaning "cylindrical," which describes the shape of the plant's shoots. In 1926, Charles Russell Orcutt moved this variety to the Ferocactus genus.

== Conservation ==
Having a sculptural form and picturesque qualities, this cactus is threatened by plant collectors. It is also losing habitat to clearing for new wind farms and solar power plants in the Mojave Desert and Colorado Desert.

Protected areas with notable populations include

- Anza-Borrego Desert State Park
- Joshua Tree National Park
- Mojave National Preserve
- Santa Rosa and San Jacinto Mountains National Monument

== Gallery ==
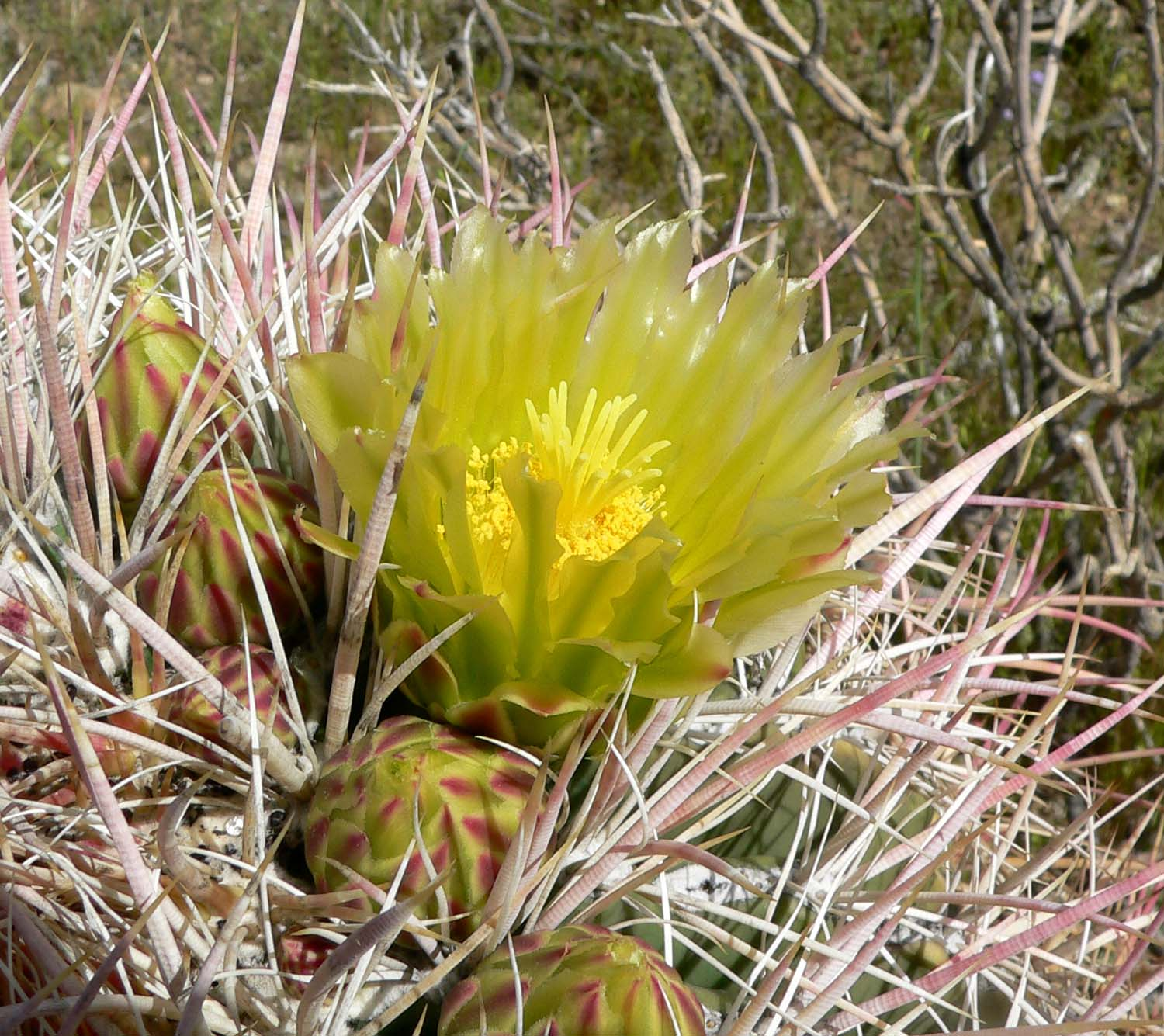
Flower, in Palm Canyon, California.

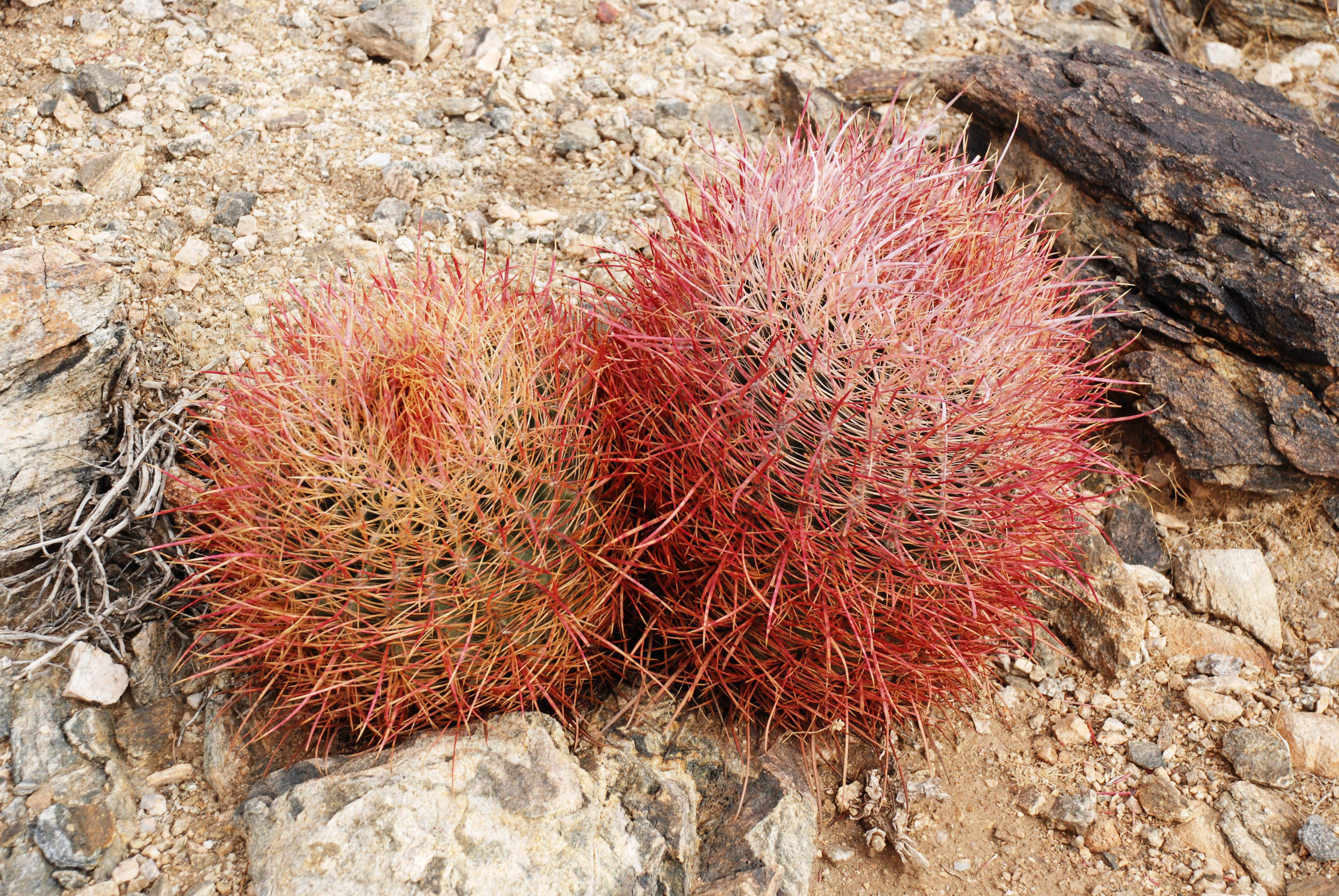
Red barrel cacti, Joshua Tree National Park.

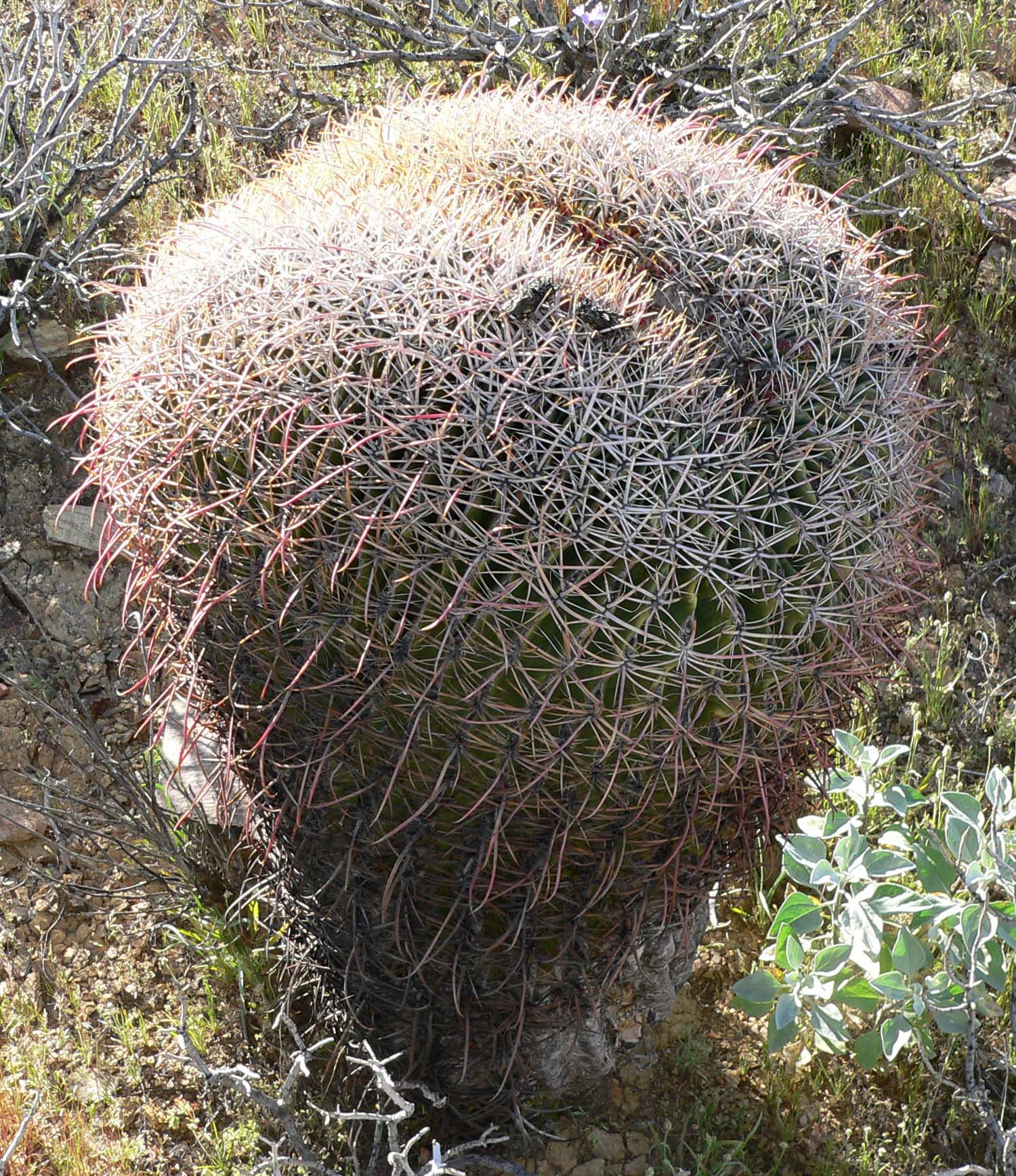
Unusual shape, in Palm Canyon, California.
