= Ivanpah Mountains =

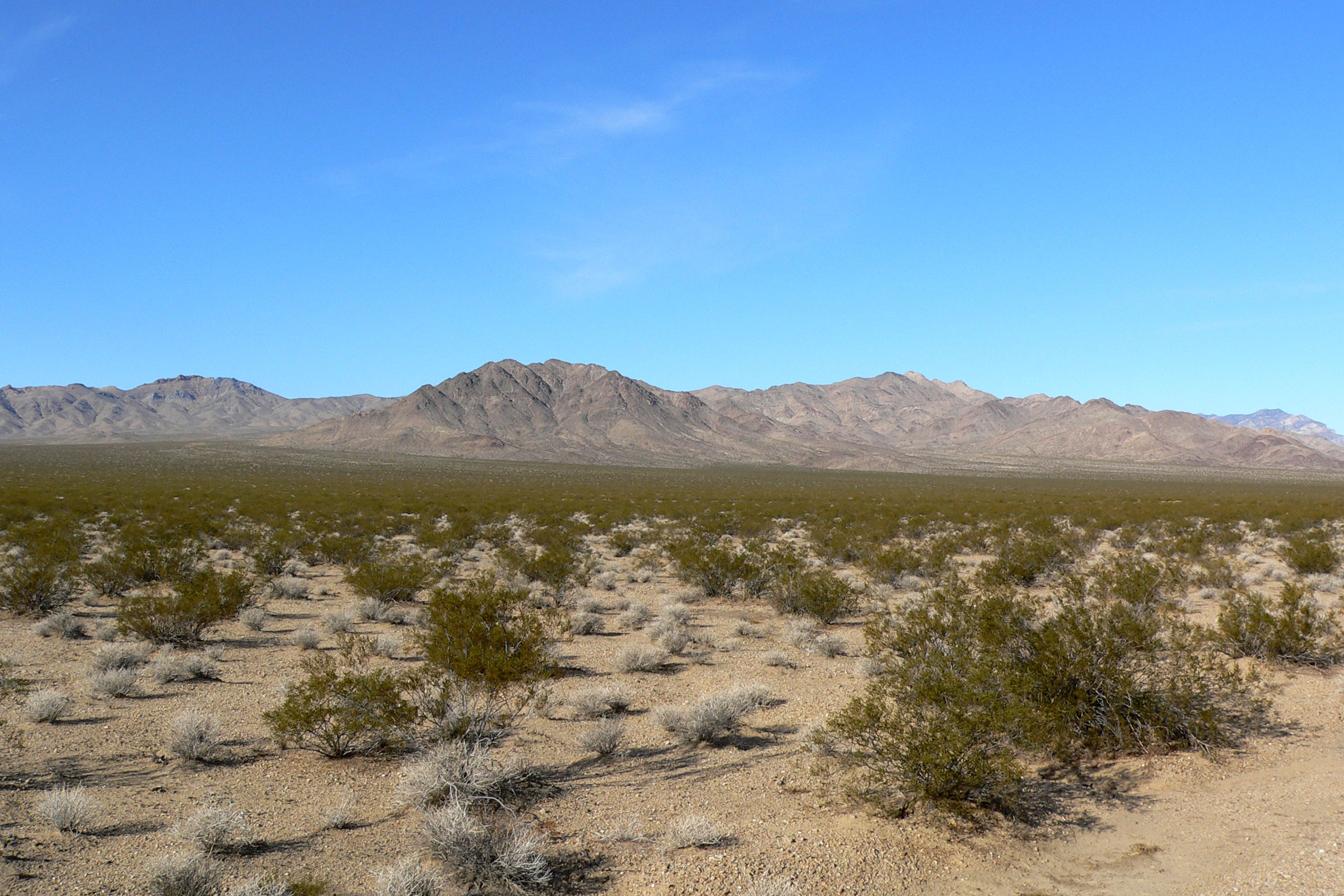
- The east side of the Ivanpah Mountains as viewed from Ivanpah Valley

Highest point
- Peak: Kessler Peak
- Elevation: 6,155 ft (1,876 m)
- Listing: Mountain ranges of California
- Coordinates: 35°18′54″N 115°31′45″W

Geography
- Location within California
- Country: United States
- State: California
- County: San Bernardino
- Range coordinates: 35°22′27.943″N 115°30′22.983″W
- Topo map(s): USGS Cima Dome, Mineral Hill, Mescal Range and Joshua 7.5 min. quads or the Ivanpah and Mescal Range 15 min. quads.

The Ivanpah Mountains are located in the southeastern Mojave Desert of California in the United States. The range lies to the south and east of the Mescal Range and Clark Mountain Range. Piute Valley lies between the Ivanpahs and the Mescal Range and Wheaton Wash lies between the Ivanpahs and the Clark Mountains to the north. Interstate 15 traverses the Wheaton Wash to the north of the Ivanpahs.

The Ivanpah Valley lies to the southeast with the New York Mountains beyond. The mountains lie in a general southwest-northeasterly direction, however Mineral Hill in the northeast part of the range lies at right angles to this trend.

The mountains have had a rich mining history and are home to the Morning Star, Kokoweef, and Allured Mines among numerous others mostly worked in the late 19th and early 20th centuries.

The southern part of the range lies in the Mojave National Preserve.
