= Cima volcanic field =

Volcanic field in San Bernardino County, California

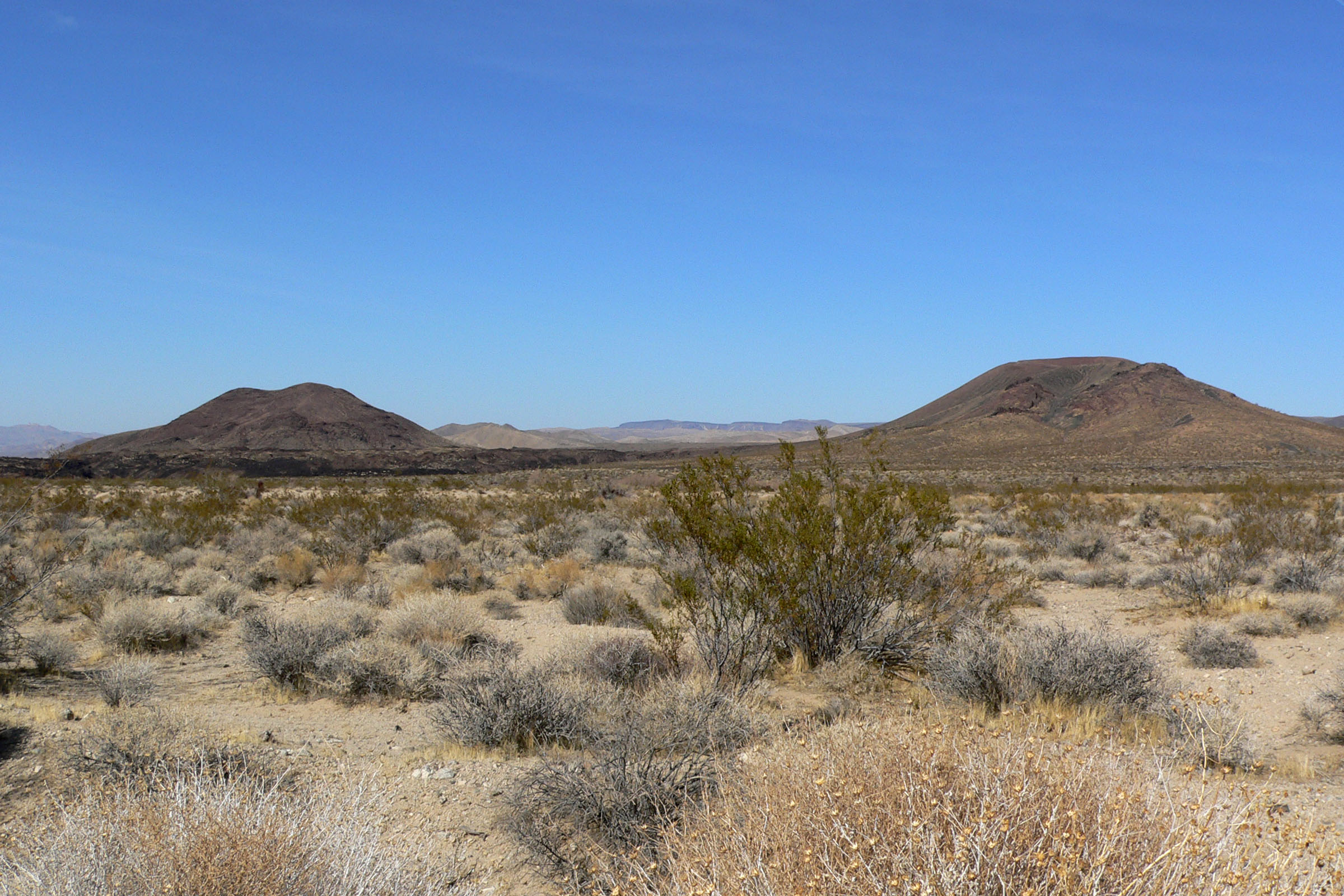
- Cinder cones seen from Kelbaker Road in 2006

Highest point
- Coordinates: 35°15′0″N 115°45′0″W

Geography
- Location within California

Geology
- Rock age(s): Late Miocene-Pleistocene; ~13-0.015 Ma
- Mountain type: Volcanic field
- Last eruption: 15,000 ± 5,000 years before present

Cima volcanic field is a volcanic field in San Bernardino County, California, close to the border with Nevada. The volcanic field covers a surface area of 600 km^{2} (230 mi^{2}) within the Mojave National Preserve west of the Cima Dome and consists of about 40 volcanic cones with about 60 lava flows. The volcanic cones range from simple cones over multi-cratered mountains to eroded hills, and lava flows are up to 9.1 km (5.7 mi) long. At least one lava tube exists in the field and can be visited.

Volcanic activity in the field commenced in the Late Miocene and after a pause between 3 and 1 million years ago continued into the latest Pleistocene. The youngest cone is known as the Black Tank cone and formed about 15,000 years before present, although it is possible that it was formed through two separate eruption events; formerly it was considered to be of historical age.

== Geography and geology ==
The Cima volcanic field lies in the eastern Mojave Desert of California, between the Shadow Valley in the northeast, the Cima Dome in the east and the Soda Lake Valley in the southwest. Southwest of the field is Kelbaker Road which crosses some lava flows, and dirt roads such as the Indian Springs Trail and the Aiken Mine Road crisscross between the volcanoes.

Interstate 15 passes north of the field and just south of older volcanic units, while California State Route 127 runs west and southwest of the field, The city of Las Vegas is 120 kilometers (75 mi) northeast of the area. The Cima volcanoes are part of the Mojave National Preserve. In 1973, they were designated as the Cinder Cone Natural Area, a National Natural Landmark.

During the Holocene and until recent times, humans engraved petroglyphs into the lava flows. One cinder cone was quarried to obtain materials for road construction. The volcanic field has been the subject of soil sciences and landscape development research.

=== Regional ===
Volcanism is widespread in the western United States and occurs in various forms at various places. Among the better known are the Cascade volcanoes created by subduction off the western coast of North America, which include the caldera of Mount Mazama (created by a large eruption in the early Holocene) as well as stratovolcanoes such as Mount St. Helens and mafic volcanic fields. Other volcanic centres in the United States are those associated with Yellowstone Caldera and Snake River Plain, those along the margins of the Colorado Plateau, volcanoes linked to the Rio Grande Rift and Jemez lineament, and finally volcanoes in the western Basin and Range Province such as the Cima volcanic field where the crust is extending.

Generally, volcanic activity was widespread in the dry regions of the western United States during the Tertiary and Quaternary, forming several volcanic fields. An earlier phase of felsic (Note: Volcanic rocks enriched in elements that are not easily included into a crystal, such as aluminium, potassium, silicium and sodium.) volcanism during the Tertiary was followed during the Quaternary by more basaltic volcanism, often in the form of short-lived volcanic vents. Examples of this kind of volcanism are the Cima volcanic field, the San Francisco volcanic field (Arizona), the Southwest Nevada volcanic field (Nevada) and the Zuni-Bandera volcanic field (New Mexico).

The Cima volcanic field is part of the Mojave Desert, which in turn belongs to the Basin and Range Province and features both mountains exceeding 2,000 meters (6,600 ft) height which trend in southeast–northwest direction, with broad valleys between the mountains. Other volcanoes there include Dish Hill, Amboy Crater and Pisgah Crater.

=== Local ===
There are about 40 cones in the Cima volcanic field. The cones are as much as 890 meters (2,920 ft) wide and 170 meters (560 ft) high, and are concentrated between elevations of 1,400–790 meters (4,600–2,600 ft) on a south-southwest tilting slope. Some cones are well preserved with intact craters, while others have been reduced to hills by erosion. Some cones have more than one crater. North of the main field lie two outcrops of older volcanic rocks (Miocene to Pliocene); other than this separate older outcrop volcanic activity appears to have occurred without any preferential alignment. Several washes such as Willow Wash, Black Tank Wash and Indian Creek cross through the field and have eroded lava flows.

The youngest cone (35°10′53″N 115°49′1″W) in the southwestern part of the field is called Black Tank cone. The Black Tank cone is the source of a 2-kilometer (1.2 mi) long lava flow, which at first forms a levee-bound channel and then narrows out into a lobate shape. It also shows traces of a lava tube and has a volume of 0.015 cubic kilometers (0.0036 cu mi). This flow may have been preceded by a previous lava flow which was later buried by the main flow. An older vent lies just south-southwest of the Black Tank Cone.

The field presents black and red volcanic rocks in the form of cinders, exposed feeder dikes and lava bombs, as well as agglutinates which are exposed in gullies and eroded vents. Bombs and cinders cover the less eroded cones, which are also sometimes surrounded by base surge deposits. At some vents, tuff rings formed through phreatomagmatic activity. Erosion has dug gullies and larger valleys in the older cones, including one 150-meter (490 ft) deep gorge.

Volcanic material covers a surface area of about 150 square kilometers (58 sq mi) within an area of c. 600 square kilometers (230 sq mi). The volcanic field was emplaced on a basement of Tertiary age, which comprises both crystalline bedrock and thick gravel deposits. Other rock formations in the area are of Proterozoic–Paleozoic to Mesozoic (Teutonia batholith) age, and the region is considered to be part of the Ivanpah uplift. (Note: The Ivanpah uplift is a series of broad dome-like structures in the topography that developed 11-5 million years ago.)

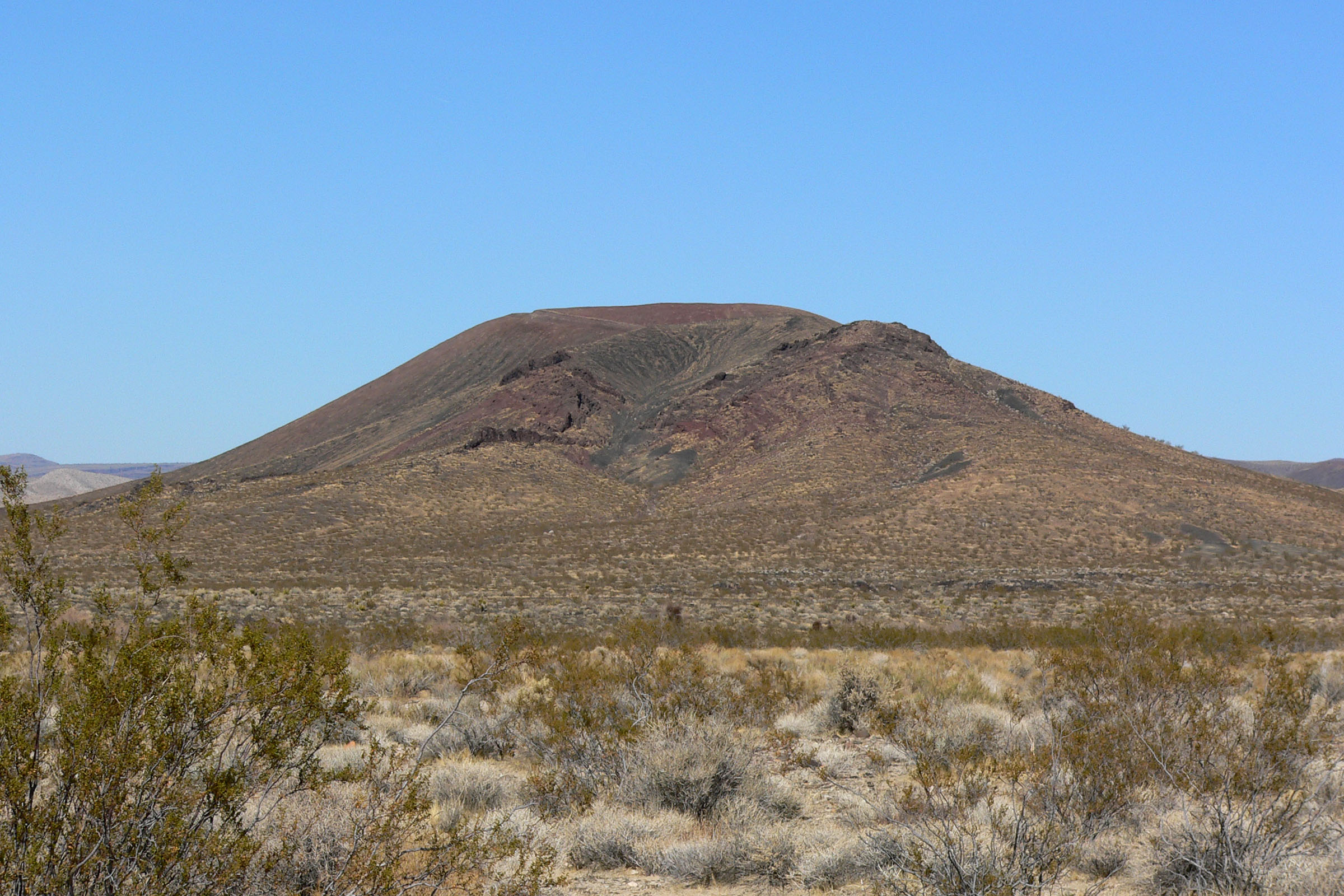

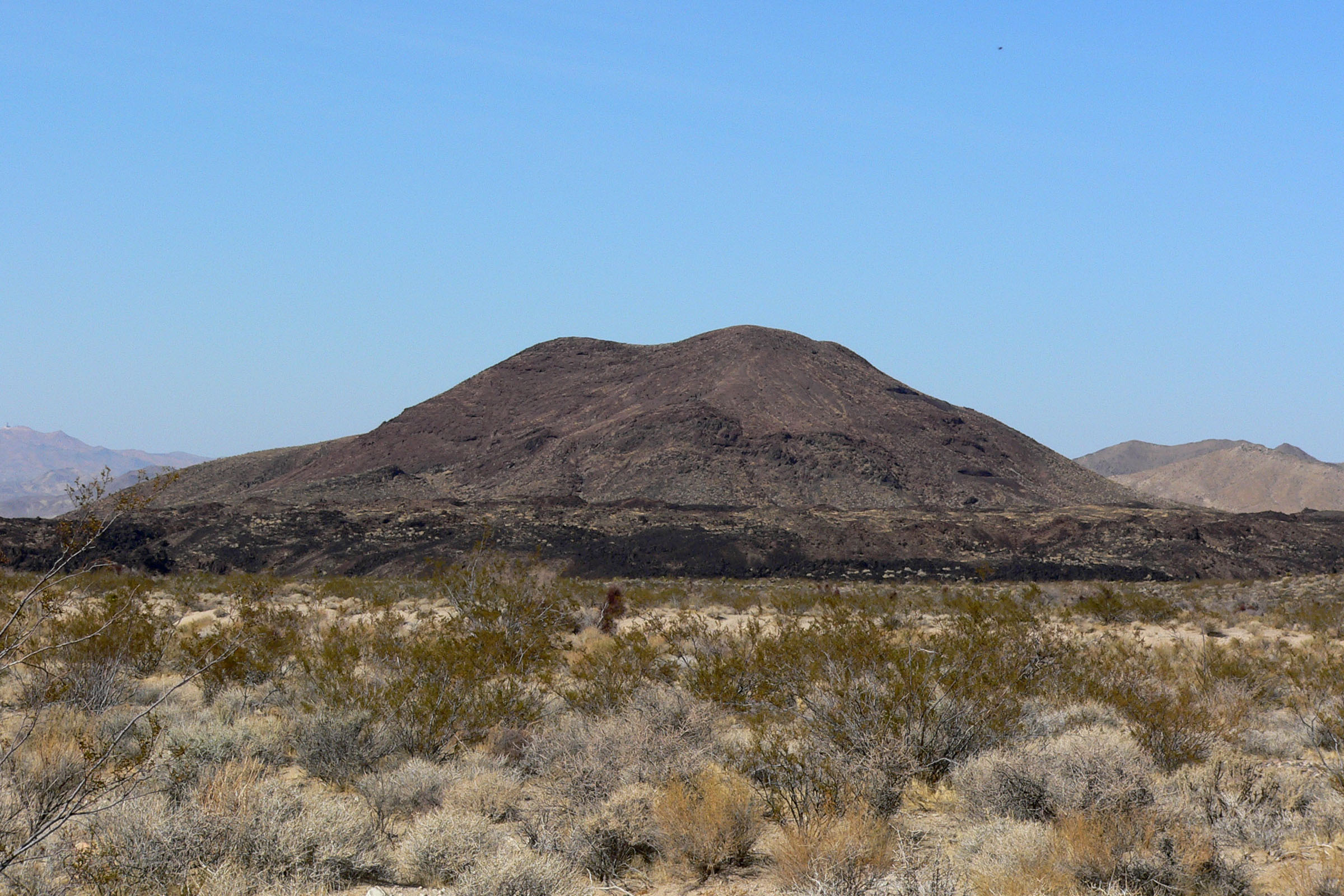

==== Lava flows ====
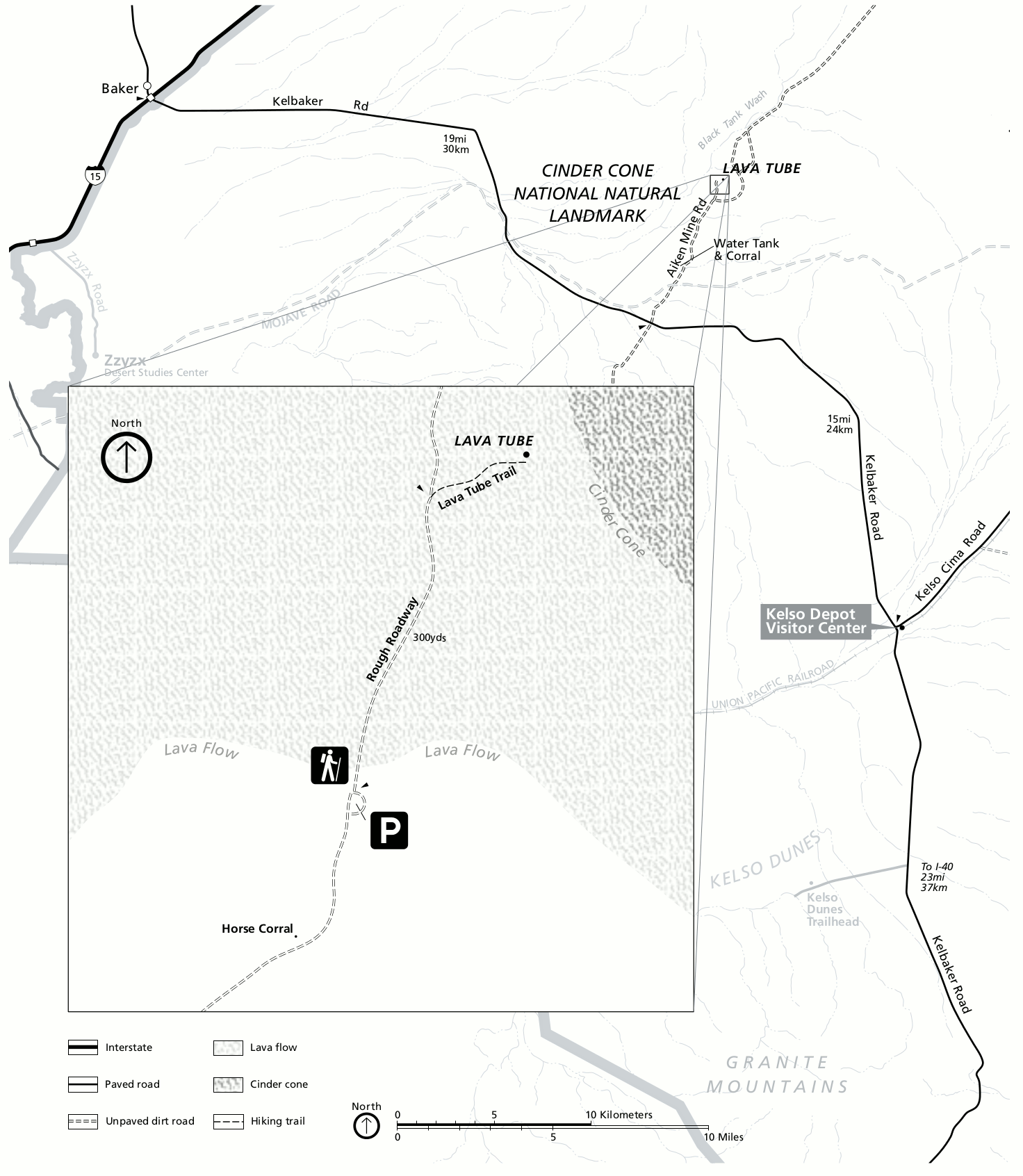
Map of the road to the lava tube

The cones have given rise to about 60 lava flows. Lava flows reach lengths of 9.1 kilometers (5.7 mi), thicknesses of 2.5–4 meters (8 ft 2 in – 13 ft 1 in) and have surface features similar to pahoehoe or aa lava depending on how steep the slopes they flowed down were. The lava flows display structures like levees, finger-like and lobe-like edges at the lava flow margins, spines and spires and material from the cones that was rafted away by the lavas. One can distinguish between long, gently sloping flows which dominate the field, and shorter, steeper rougher flows covered by blocks with sizes of up to 0.5 meters (1 ft 8 in). One major lava tube lies in the Cima field and is accessible through a skylight; it is 100 meters (330 ft) long and 5–3 meters (16.4–9.8 ft) wide. In some places flows surrounded basement outcrops, forming kipukas. (Note: A Kipuka is an "island" formed by a lava flow, when it surrounds older outcrops.) In accordance to the slope of the area, most lavas flowed westward.

Younger flows often show crisp lava flow features while older flows are almost always mantled with younger material and have lost their original surface features. The oldest flows have flat or gentle surfaces and their source vents are heavily degraded. Lava flows are also in part covered by wind-transported or erosional material and desert varnish.

=== Composition ===
The field has erupted alkali basalt, basanite and hawaiite. Phenocrysts include clinopyroxene, olivine and plagioclase. There are also xenoliths including dunite, gabbro, granite, and notably ultramafic to mafic xenoliths such as peridotite derived from the mantle. The rock composition has not changed much during the history of the Cima volcanoes, but three distinct groups have been identified. Temperatures of 1,110 °C (2,030 °F) have been estimated for the lava erupted by the Black Tank cone.

The magma erupted in the field ultimately appears to originate from the lithospheric or asthenospheric mantle with little contribution of crustal components, unlike earlier felsic volcanism. Upwelling of asthenosphere material appears to be responsible for the volcanism at the end, possibly associated with the change in the tectonics of the region from subduction-dominated to tectonics of a transform boundary. Fractional crystallization, magma ponding in the crust, differences in the mantle sources and partial melting processes have been invoked to explain certain compositional differences in the erupted rocks. Xenoliths indicate that magma ascent to the surface is rapid, with no stalling, and processes of magma formation to surface eruption take only a few days.

== Climate and vegetation ==
The climate of the area is warm and dry with average temperatures of 18–16 °C (64–61 °F) and average precipitation amounting to 250–150 millimeters per year (9.8–5.9 in/year). Most precipitation falls during winter, with only small amounts of rain falling during summer as monsoonal rainfall. Before the beginning of the Holocene, the climate was wetter and this facilitated the development of soils on lava flows. During the Holocene, playas (Note: Playas are ephemeral lakes.) became sources for wind-blown dust which accumulates on the lava.

Vegetation in the area is classified as scrub, with plants including brittle bush, creosote bush, Mormon tea and white bursage. Joshua trees grow at higher elevations. Some of these species arrived during the Holocene, while others became established during the Pleistocene or appeared and disappeared repeatedly. Vegetation grows in clusters separated by soil covered by desert pavement. The youngest cone is unvegetated and little vegetation has developed on other recent volcanic vents and lava flows.

== Eruptive history ==
Early research postulated a Pleistocene age for the northern part of the field and a Holocene age for the southern; later radiometric dates indicated Miocene ages for the northern parts of the field. More recent research showed Miocene ages for the northern volcanics and Pleistocene ages for the southern. An eruption rate of 8 events per 100,000 years and a magma output of 0.001 cubic kilometers per millennium (0.00024 mi^{3}/ka) has been estimated for the Cima field.

According to potassium-argon dating, volcanic activity started in the Miocene and continued to the end of the Pleistocene. Activity has been subdivided into five phases, the first between 7.6 and 6.5 million years ago, the second between 5.1 and 3.6 million years ago, the third between 1.1 and 0.6 million years ago, the fourth between 750,000 and 200,000 years ago and the fifth and last between 200,000 and 10,000 years ago. The radiometric ages have been corroborated by morphological and paleomagnetic information. Volcanic activity paused between 3 and 1 million years ago.

The oldest volcanic phase left a heavily dissected volcano in the southeastern part of the field, while the subsequent phase involved lava flows in the northern part of the field that take the form of eroded mesas. The final three phases formed lava flows and the volcanoes in the southern part of the field. Eruptions commenced as maar-forming eruptions and continued with the growth of cinder cones and lava flows. Unlike regular cinder cones which usually erupt only once, some cones at Cima experienced more than one eruption and were active over hundreds of thousands of years.

The Black Tank cone, the youngest cone in the field, has been dated to 15,000 ± 5,000 years before present by several methods. Some evidence suggested a historical age for one of the southern lava flows, with earlier radiocarbon dating yielding an age of 330–480 years. Several chronological data imply that the lava flow was formed during two separate eruptive episodes, one 20,000 years ago and the other 11,500 - 13,000 years ago. The lava flow was probably laid down in less than a week of time, and the growth of the cone was influenced by wind, which transported tephra east-southeastwards where it fell out and formed a tephra blanket.

== See also ==
- Aiken's Wash
- List of volcanoes in the United States
- List of volcanic fields
