= Mojave National Preserve =

Protected wilderness area in California, United States

- IUCN category V (protected landscape/seascape)
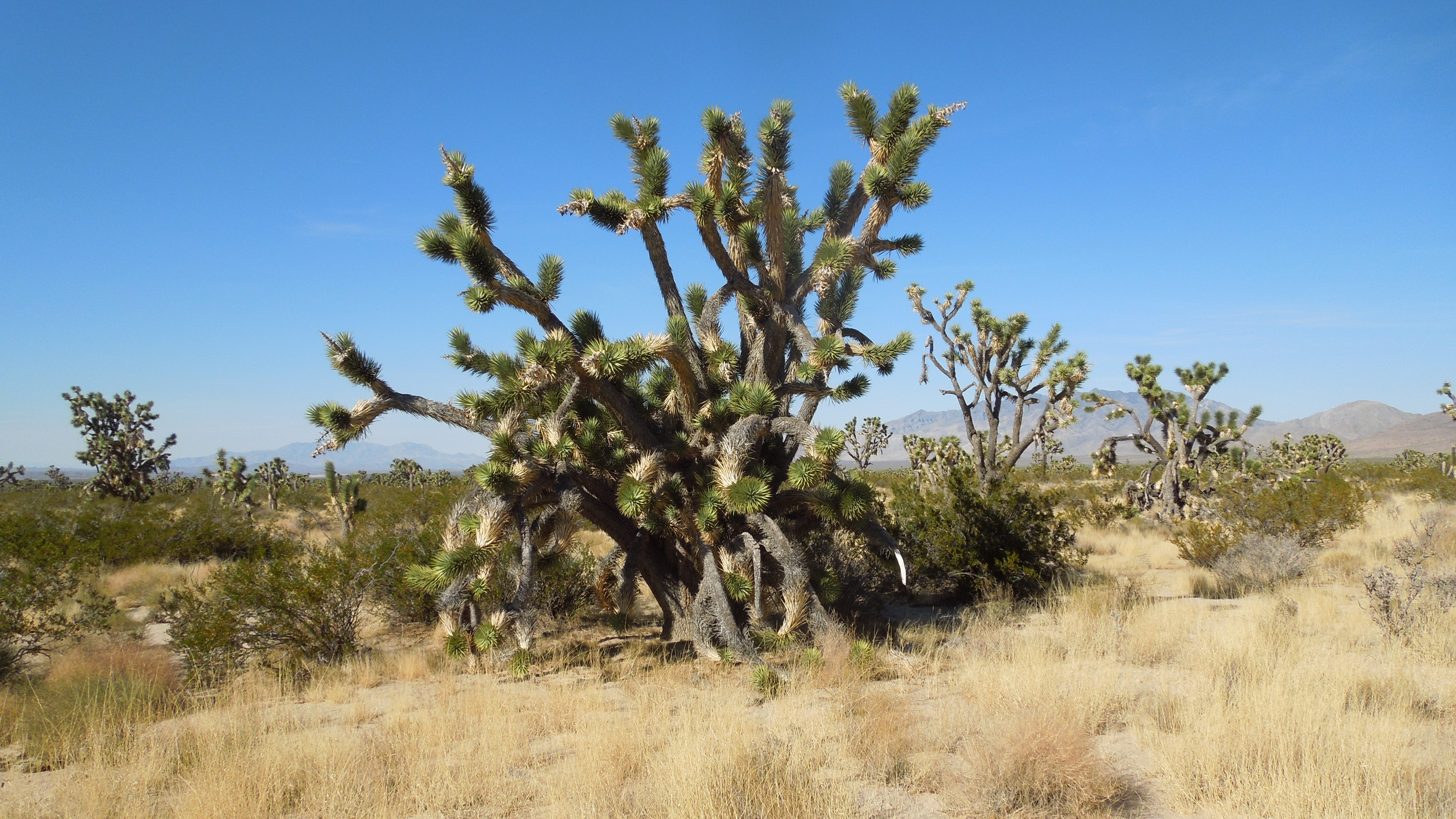
- Joshua trees along Cima Road in the Mojave National Preserve
- Interactive map of Mojave National Preserve
- Location: San Bernardino County, California, US
- Nearest city: Baker, California
- Coordinates: 34°53′N 115°43′W
- Area: 1,542,776 acres (6,243.39 km^{2})
- Created: October 31, 1994
- Visitors: 424,864 (in 2024)
- Governing body: National Park Service
- Website: www.nps.gov/moja/index.htm

External videos
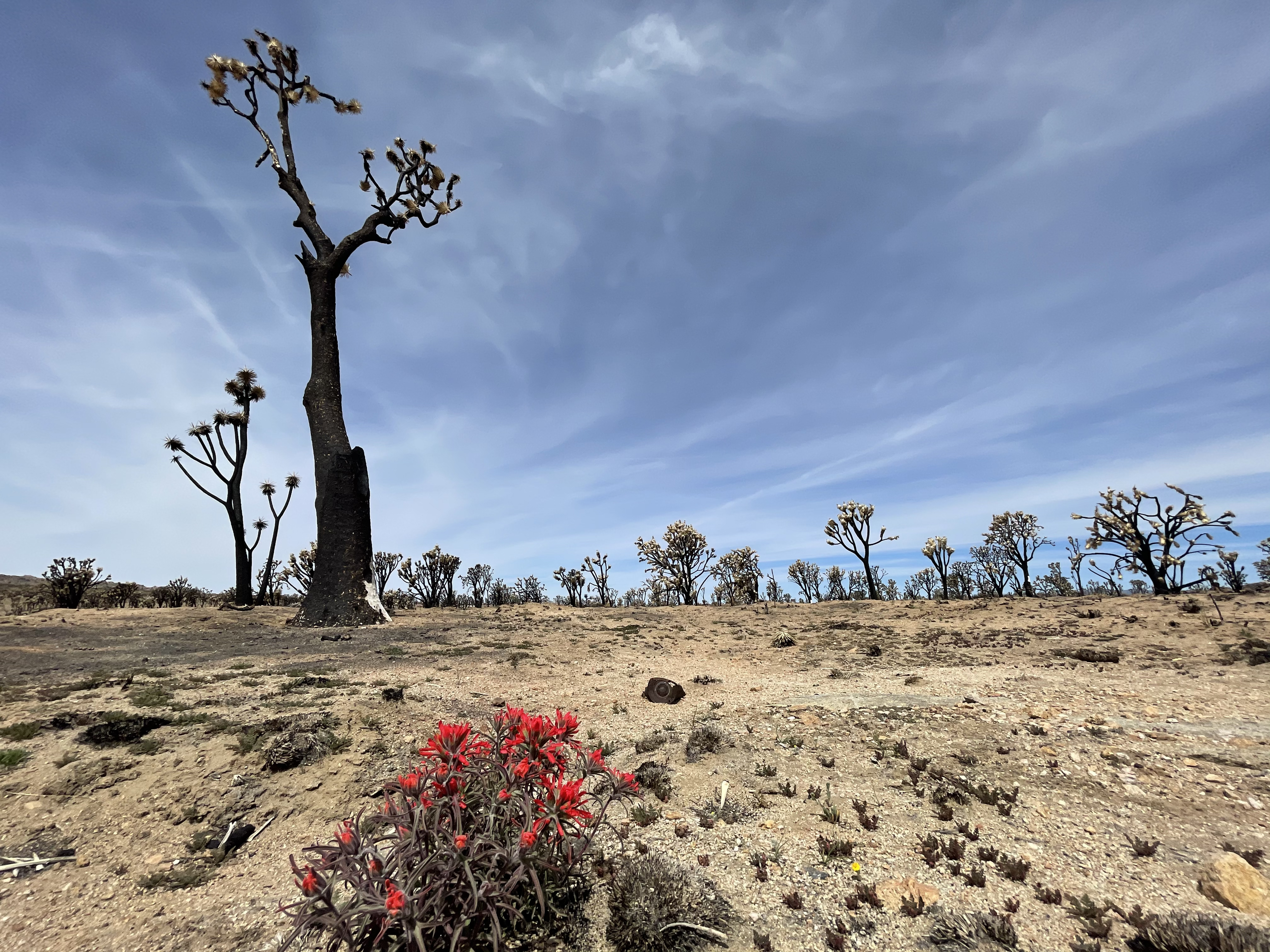
- “Can a fire-ravaged forest of Joshua trees be restored?”, Tien Nguyen, Knowable Magazine, March 4, 2022.

Mojave National Preserve is a US National Preserve located in the Mojave Desert of San Bernardino County, California, between Interstate 15 and Interstate 40. Established in 1994, it is the third largest unit of the National Park system within the contiguous United States, and the largest national preserve.

The preserve spans 1,542,776 acres (6,243 km^{2}). It surrounds Providence Mountains State Recreation Area and Mitchell Caverns Natural Preserve, which are both managed by the California Department of Parks and Recreation.

Natural features include the Kelso Dunes, the Marl Mountains and the Cima Dome, as well as volcanic formations such as Hole-in-the-Wall and the Cinder Cone Lava Beds. The Joshua tree forest covering Cima Dome and the adjacent Shadow Valley is the largest and densest in the world.

The preserve contains the ghost town of Kelso. The defunct Kelso Depot serves as the park's official visitor center, though it is temporarily closed as of 2025.

== History ==
=== Protection ===
The preserve was established October 31, 1994, with the enactment of the California Desert Protection Act by the United States Congress, which also established Joshua Tree National Park and Death Valley National Park. Previously, some lands contained within the preserve were protected as the East Mojave National Scenic Area, under the jurisdiction of the Bureau of Land Management. The land was made a national preserve, not a national park, in order to allow hunting and ranching to continue within its borders; desert protection activists felt that insisting on national park status would have eroded too much support for the bill, which was already controversial.

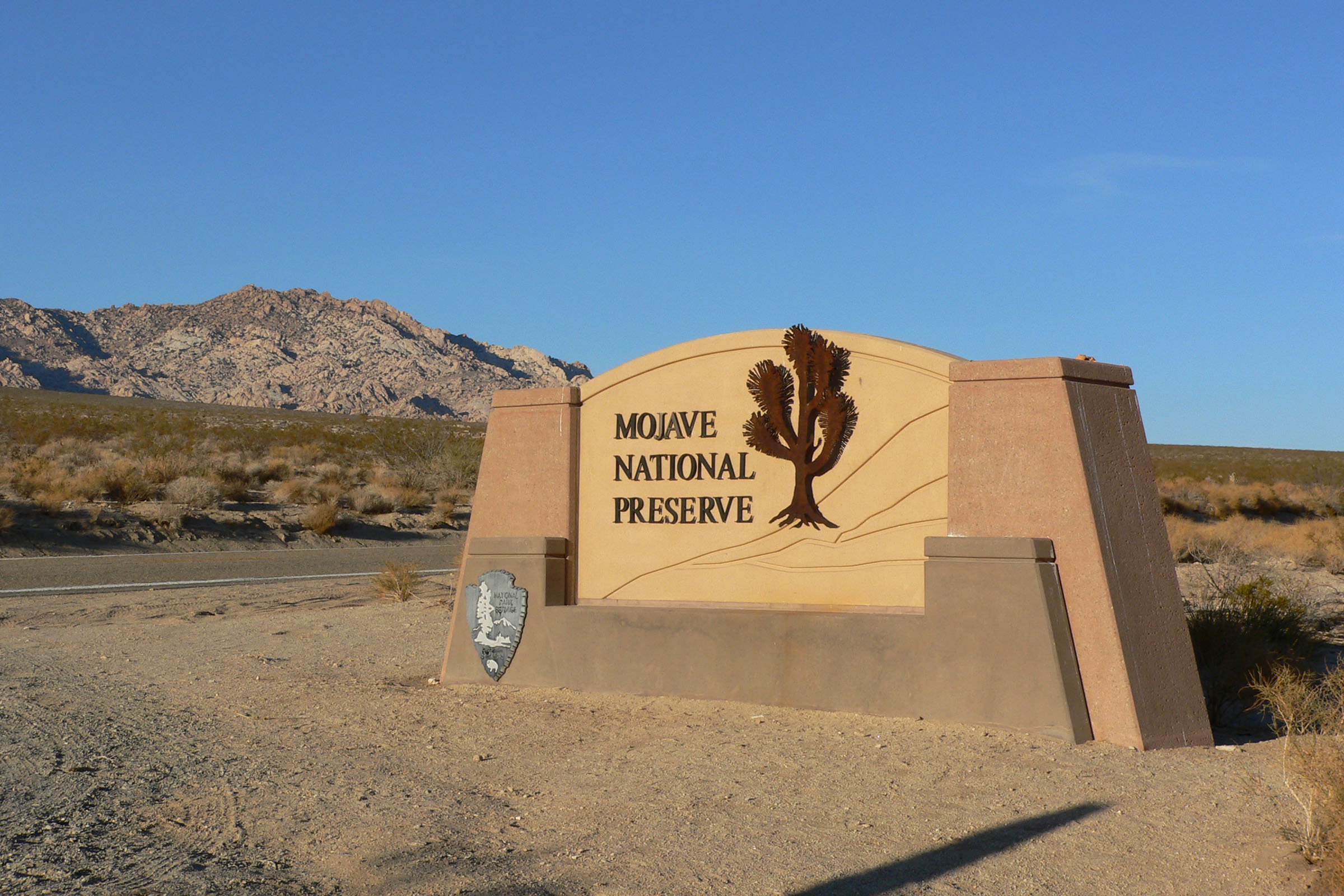
The entrance sign alongside Kelbaker Road

Upon the preserve's establishment, Mary Martin was designated as its superintendent. Martin served from 1994 to 2005, when she was moved to Lassen Volcanic National Park. Dennis Schramm then served from 2005 to 2010. Stephanie Dubois served from 2010 to 2014. Todd Suess served from 2014 to 2020, though he continues to work for the National Park Service as the Chief of Biological Resources. Mike Gauthier served from 2020 to 2023, and is now superintendent at Lake Mead National Recreation Area.

The preserve is underfunded compared to other National Park Service units. In its first year, the House Ways and Means Committee allocated it a budget of one dollar. Administrators responded to the lack of funding by choosing to make it "a park people could discover for themselves", with few developed facilities for visitors.

The preserve continues to face challenges due to lack of funding. As of 2018, the preserve had a deferred maintenance of $118,036,341. This has led to infrastructure disrepair which, in combination with the reckless driving by some visitors, has caused a significant threat to the endangered desert tortoise population within the preserve. In addition to the tortoise's threatened population, the prairie falcon and the bighorn sheep are both at a risk within the preserve. A common solution provided to help save this population is to install wildlife crossings over the main roads within the preserve, though this is currently not possible with the funding provided.

The preserve reported 424,864 visitors in 2024, although its visitation figures have been challenged due to the inclusion of through traffic.

=== 2020 wildfire ===
In August 2020, a wildfire destroyed 1.3 million Joshua trees around Cima Dome.

== Geology ==
The Beale, Clark, Granite, Ivanpah, Kelso, Little Thorne, Marl, New York, and Providence mountain ranges are located within the preserve, as well as the lower Mid Hills and Vontrigger Hills.

The preserve's highest point (as well as the highest point in the Mojave Desert as a whole) is Clark Mountain, at 7,930 feet (2,420 m) above sea level.

The Cima volcanic field is located in the northern section of the park. It features a lava tube that can be entered by visitors.

Devils Playground, a large sandy expanse, lies along the park's western edge, between the Providence Mountains and the town of Baker. The Kelso Dunes are located in the southwest of the preserve near the Granite Mountains.

== Settlements ==
When the preserve was established in 1994, its borders contained over 85,000 acres (340 km^{2}) of private land (inholdings), including more than 70,000 acres (280 km^{2}) in the Lanfair Valley. Ranching was once a major activity in the preserve, and it continues to this day.

Many of the settled areas in the park are now ghost towns, including Kelso, Ivanpah, Lanfair, Providence, and Vanderbilt, though Kelso still hosts a population of Park Service employees.

Other towns in the preserve include Cima, the newer town of Ivanpah, and Zzyzx (known for its unusual name). Cima is generally considered a de facto ghost town due to its low population.

== Recreation ==
The preserve contains three developed campgrounds, of which Hole-in-the-Wall Campground is the largest. Roadside camping is allowed in previously disturbed sites throughout the preserve, many of which are located on unmaintained dirt roads.

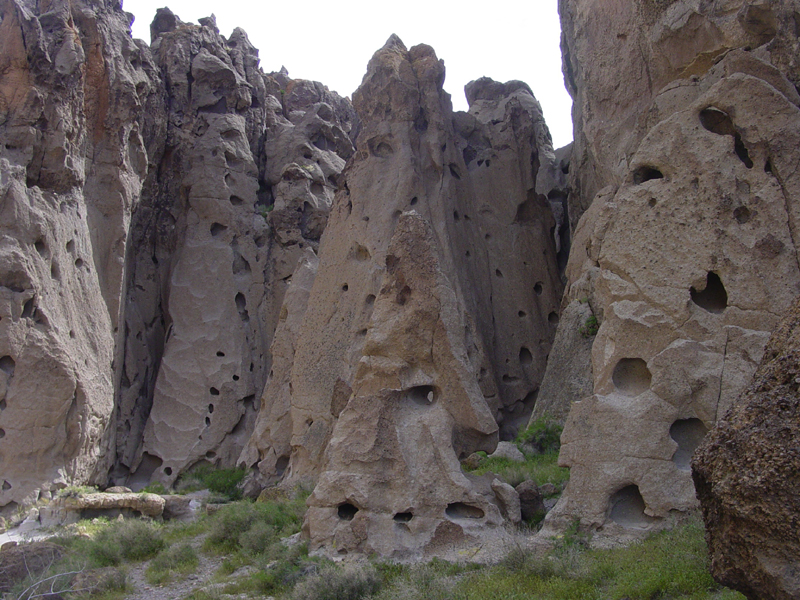
Hole-in-the-Wall canyon

The preserve is commonly traversed by four-wheel drive vehicles traveling on the historic Mojave Road, part of the Old Spanish National Historic Trail.

The Mojave phone booth was once a popular tourist attraction in the park. It was removed by Pacific Bell at the request of the National Park Service in 2000.

== Wilderness ==
The California Desert Protection Act of 1994 (CDPA) designated a wilderness area within Mojave National Preserve of approximately 695,200 acres (281,300 ha). The National Park Service manages the wilderness in accordance with the Wilderness Act, the CDPA, and other laws that protect cultural and historic sites in the wilderness.

== Climate ==
Climate in the preserve varies greatly. Summer temperatures average 90 °F (32 °C), with highs exceeding 105 °F (41 °C). Elevations in the preserve range from 7,929 feet (2,417 m) at Clark Mountain to 880 feet (270 m) near Baker. Annual precipitation varies from 3.37 inches (86 mm) near Baker, to almost 9 inches (230 mm) in the mountains. At least 25% of precipitation comes from summer thunderstorms. Snow is often found in the mountains during the winter.

The following climate data is for a higher elevation area in the preserve. See also Climate of the Mojave Desert.

Climate data for Mountain Pass, California. (Elevation 4,740 feet (1,440 m))
Month	Jan	Feb	Mar	Apr	May	Jun	Jul	Aug	Sep	Oct	Nov	Dec	Year
Record high °F (°C)	71 (22)	76 (24)	81 (27)	90 (32)	104 (40)	109 (43)	110 (43)	109 (43)	102 (39)	96 (36)	89 (32)	70 (21)	110 (43)
Mean daily maximum °F (°C)	50.4 (10.2)	53.7 (12.1)	59.0 (15.0)	66.4 (19.1)	76.3 (24.6)	87.0 (30.6)	92.8 (33.8)	89.9 (32.2)	83.9 (28.8)	72.4 (22.4)	58.9 (14.9)	51.1 (10.6)	70.2 (21.2)
Mean daily minimum °F (°C)	29.5 (−1.4)	32.4 (0.2)	35.8 (2.1)	41.0 (5.0)	49.8 (9.9)	59.2 (15.1)	66.5 (19.2)	64.5 (18.1)	56.6 (13.7)	46.3 (7.9)	36.2 (2.3)	30.2 (−1.0)	45.7 (7.6)
Record low °F (°C)	3 (−16)	6 (−14)	12 (−11)	19 (−7)	28 (−2)	36 (2)	42 (6)	44 (7)	33 (1)	21 (−6)	10 (−12)	−2 (−19)	−2 (−19)
Average precipitation inches (mm)	0.92 (23)	0.89 (23)	0.89 (23)	0.48 (12)	0.27 (6.9)	0.20 (5.1)	1.04 (26)	1.23 (31)	0.59 (15)	0.54 (14)	0.68 (17)	0.63 (16)	8.36 (212)
Average snowfall inches (cm)	2.7 (6.9)	1.8 (4.6)	1.4 (3.6)	0.5 (1.3)	0.2 (0.51)	0 (0)	0 (0)	0 (0)	0 (0)	0.1 (0.25)	1.1 (2.8)	1.5 (3.8)	9.3 (24)
Source: The Western Regional Climate Center

== See also ==
- Mojave Memorial Cross
