= Kelbaker Road =

Road in California

- Maintained by: San Bernardino County, California
- Length: 68.7 mi (110.6 km)
- Location: San Bernardino County, California, United States
- South end: CR 66 / National Trails Highway east of Amboy
- Major junctions: I-40 north-northeast of Amboy
- North end: I-15 / SR 127 in Baker

Kelbaker Road is a paved road in San Bernardino County, California, that serves as the primary and busiest route through the Mojave National Preserve. It also connects the communities of Kelso and Baker. Its southern terminus is at County Route 66 (CR 66) between Amboy and Chambless. Kelbaker Road's northern terminus is at Interstate 15 (I-15) in Baker. The road then continues as State Route 127 (SR 127) northward to Nevada, connecting to SR 373, passing near Death Valley National Park.

== Route description ==
Kelbaker Road begins at County Route 66, part of the National Trails Highway (Historic Route 66) between Amboy and Chambless. It then travels north between the Bristol Mountains on the west and the Marble Mountains to the east to its junction at Interstate 40, north of Brown Buttes. From there, Kelbaker Road continues northeast between the Granite Mountains on the west and Providence Mountains to the east, over the 4,035-foot (1,230 m) Granite Pass, and then north past the eastern edge of the Kelso Dunes to the community of Kelso.

From Kelso, Kelbaker Road continues north running near the foot of the Kelso Mountains. Reaching near the foot of Kelso Peak, the road then runs northwest between the Kelso Mountains to the west and the Marl Mountains on the east. Southeast of Seventeen Mile Point, the road travels parallel to Willow Wash for a few miles. Willow Wash along this section was a part of the Mojave Road or Old Government Road to Fort Mohave. The road then continues north after crossing the wash, then turns west approximately 11 miles (18 km) to Baker.

The total distance along Kelbaker Road from CR 66 to I-15 in Baker is 68.5 miles (110.2 km), while the distance from I-40 to Baker is about 56 miles (90 km).

=== Points of interest ===
Kelbaker Road is the primary route through Kelso and the Mojave National Preserve, and thus passes by or connects to points of interest such as:

- Cinder Cone National Natural Landmark
- Granite Mountains
- Kelso Depot
- Kelso Dunes

== Major intersections ==
The entire route is in San Bernardino County.

Location	mi	km	Destinations	Notes
	0.0	0.0	National Trails Highway (CR 66) – Amboy, Chambless, Cadiz	Southern terminus of Kelbaker Road; former US 66
	11.4	18.3	I-40 (Needles Freeway) – Needles, Barstow	I-40 exit 78
Kelso	33.9	54.6	Kelso-Cima Road – Hayden, Cima	Southern terminus of Kelso-Cima Road
Baker	68.5	110.2	I-15 (Mojave Freeway) / SR 127 north – Las Vegas, Barstow	Southern end of SR 127 concurrency; southern terminus of SR 127; I-15 exit 246
Baker	68.7	110.6	Baker Boulevard (I-15 Bus.) – Death Valley, Las Vegas, Barstow	Northern end of SR 127 concurrency; former US 91 / US 466; roadway continues as Death Valley Road
1.000 mi = 1.609 km; 1.000 km = 0.621 mi: Concurrency terminus
