= Trilobite Wilderness =

Wilderness area in California, United States

- IUCN category Ib (wilderness area)
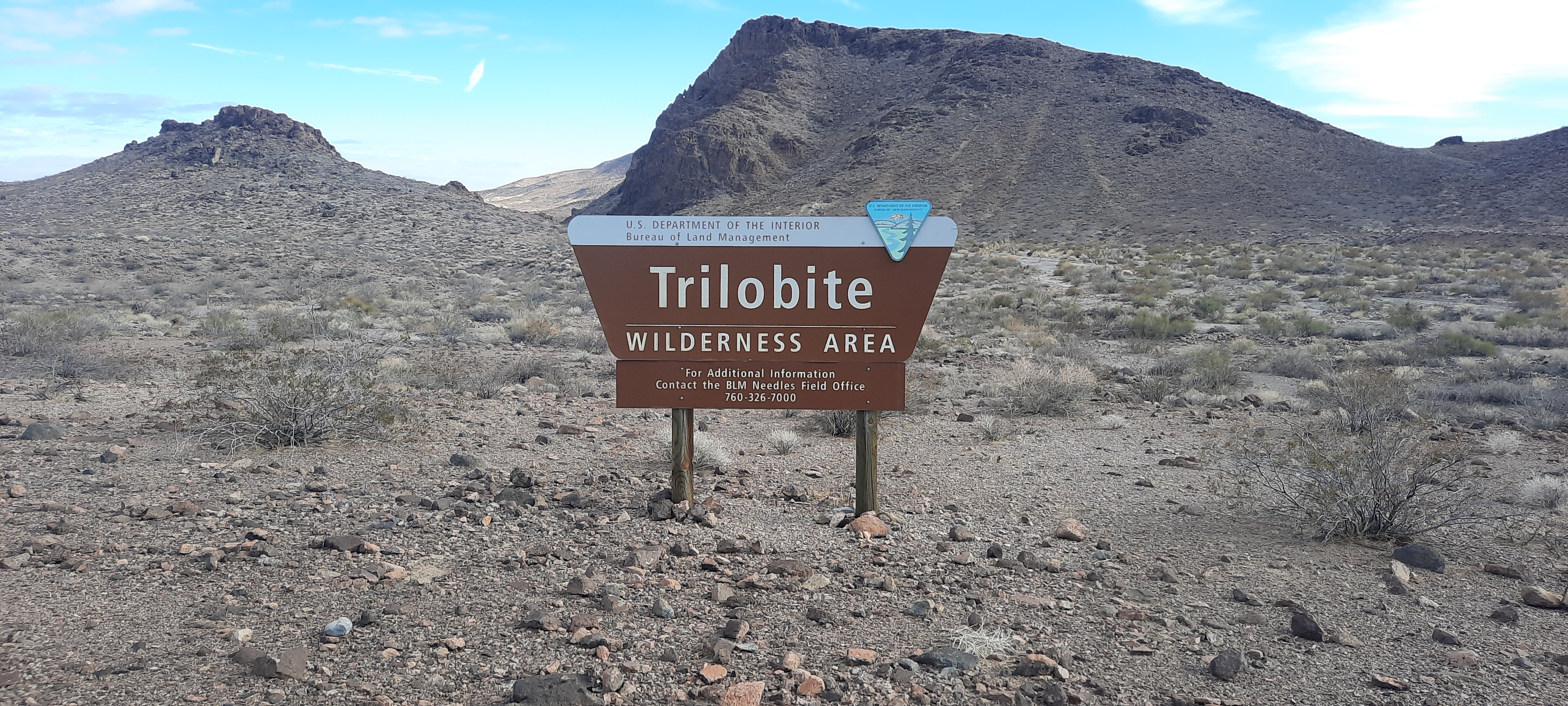
- Sign welcoming visitors to the area

- Location within southern California Location within California Location within the United States
- Location: Mojave Trails National Monument, San Bernardino County, California
- Nearest city: Chambless, California
- Coordinates: 34°38′N 115°33′W
- Area: 37,308 acres (150.98 km^{2})
- Established: 31 October 1994
- Governing body: Bureau of Land Management

The Trilobite Wilderness is a wilderness area in the Marble Mountains of the eastern Mojave Desert in northeastern San Bernardino County, California. It is named for the large number of trilobite fossils that can be found within its boundaries. Aside from its paleontological significance, it is home to typical flora and fauna of the Mojave Desert, including a stable population of bighorn sheep and desert tortoise. The area was created as an addition to the National Wilderness Preservation System in 1994 as a part of the California Desert Protection Act.

The site is managed by the Bureau of Land Management. It is one of six wilderness areas in Mojave Trails National Monument, established in 2016.

== Geology ==
In the early Cambrian, fossiliferous sediments from a shallow sea were deposited upon a basement of Proterozoic granite and later uplifted to form the Marble Mountains. These sediments – the Latham Shale Formation – are between 50 ft (15 m) and 75 ft (23 m) thick. Deeper sediments were metamorphosed into quartzite and form a thin layer ~10 ft (3.0 m) thick between the shale and basement granite.

=== Fossils ===
The abundance of trilobite fossils, some measuring as long as 8 in (20 cm), give the wilderness area its name – in places virtually every piece of extracted rock contains pieces of fossil trilobite. Trilobites from the order Olenellina are predominant, but 12 species of trilobite have been discovered in this area. Full specimens are rare, with trilobite heads being the most commonly found feature, potentially indicating the area was the site of a trilobite molting ground. In all, roughly 21 species of Cambrian invertebrates have been discovered in the area, including articulate brachiopods and Anomalocaris appendages. Oncolite fossils are also found in significant quantities. This makes the area a bucket-list location for trilobite collectors worldwide.
