= Kelso Wash =

Ephemeral stream in San Bernardino County, California, U.S.

Coordinates: 35°04′30″N 116°00′40″W

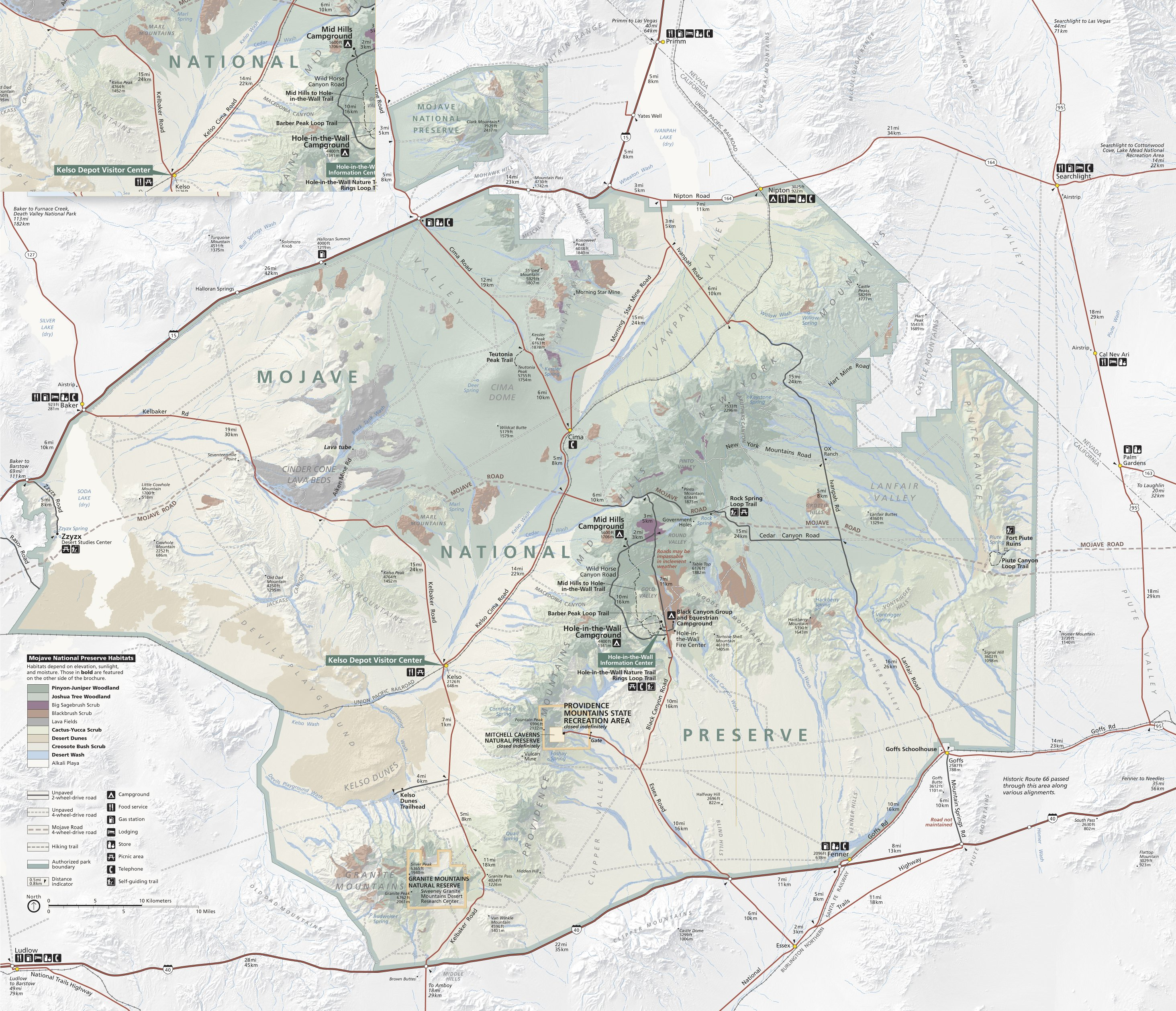
Map of the Mojave National Preserve and the Kelso Wash

Kelso Wash is an ephemeral stream in San Bernardino County, California, United States, that drains into Soda Lake (Hewett 1956, p. 6). The town of Kelso lies southeast of the wash (Muhs, Lancaster & Skipp 2017, p. 227).

Kelso Wash lies within the Mojave National Preserve. It originates at Cima, between the Kelso Mountains to the west and the Providence Mountains to the east as a southward flowing wash (Muhs, Lancaster & Skipp 2017, p. 224), where it receives the Cedar Wash from northeast and washes draining the Marl Mountains from northwest. The Cima Dome lies nearby. The area of Cima separates its valley from Ivanpah Valley (Hewett 1956, p. 9). It then turns west north of the Kelso Dunes(Muhs, Lancaster & Skipp 2017, p. 224) and receives first the Cottonwood Wash from southeast, which drains the southern Providence Mountains and the Granite Mountains (Muhs, Lancaster & Skipp 2017, p. 226), and then the Budweiser Wash from the south, which drains the Bristol Mountains, Granite Mountains and Old Dad Mountains. Kelso Wash then passes northwestward between Devils Playground to the north and Bristol Mountains to the south. It eventually ends into Soda Lake (Muhs, Lancaster & Skipp 2017, p. 224). It is the largest wash draining the area of Soda Lake.

Precipitation in the area averages about 100–200 millimetres (4–8 in). Groundwater close to the surface and runoff sustain Kelso Wash. Dunes frequently blocked its course, impounding temporary lakes that filled with sediments during the early Holocene.(Sweeney et al. 2020, p. 2328) The wash has cut as deep as 11 metres (36 ft) into the ground, and its course is flanked by river terraces.(Sweeney et al. 2020, p. 2318) The Union Pacific Railroad closely parallels the wash (Ramsey et al. 1999, p. 661).

Together with the Mojave River, it supplies water to the Mojave River sink area and Lake Tuendae (Hanrahan, Gibani & Miller 2008, p. 335). In 1984 Kelso Wash was proposed to be part of the source of sand for the Kelso Dunes (Muhs, Lancaster & Skipp 2017, p. 223).
