= Beale Mountains =

Mountain range in California, United States

Coordinates: 35°10′40″N 115°36′15″W

The Beale Mountains are located in the Mojave National Preserve in eastern California. The range is one of the smallest mountain ranges in the United States, and is only about 2.5 miles long. The mountains are located northeast of the Kelso Mountains, and east of the Marl Mountains, about five miles from the Kelso Cima road, in the Cinder Cone National Natural Landmark. The mountains lie in the arid climate zone, characterized by little rainfall. They are named after Edward Fitzgerald Beale.

These mountains are not named in the USGS Geographic Names Information System, nor on the USGS topographic map (Cima Quadrangle), but they are named on Google Maps. The highest elevation is 4413 feet.
