= Kelso Depot =

- Kelso Depot, Restaurant and Employees Hotel
- U.S. National Register of Historic Places
- U.S. Historic district
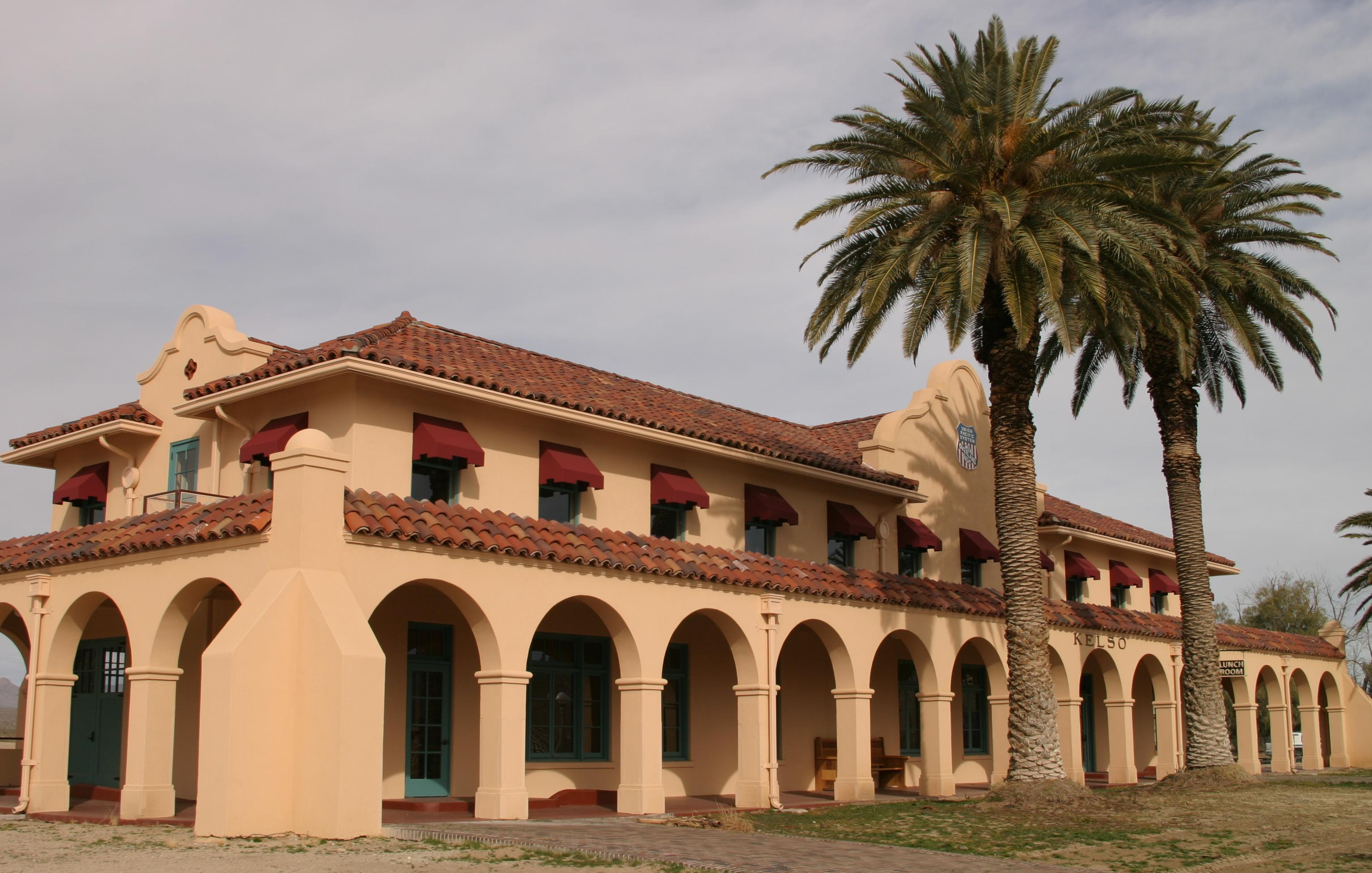

- Location within California Location within the United States
- Location: 90942 Kelso Cima Road Kelso, California
- Coordinates: 35°0′44″N 115°39′9″W
- Built: 1923
- Architect: Los Angeles and Salt Lake R.R.
- Architectural style: Mission Revival & Spanish Colonial Revival architecture
- NRHP reference No.: 01000760 (original); 100003401 (increase 1); 100011934 (increase 2)

Significant dates
- Added to NRHP: August 2, 2001
- Boundary increases: January 31, 2019; June 17, 2025

The Kelso Depot, Restaurant and Employees Hotel or Kelso Depot, now also the Mojave National Preserve Visitors Center, is located in the Mojave Desert within the National Park Service Mojave National Preserve, on Kelso Cima Road at the junction of Kelbaker Road in Kelso, California, between Baker and Interstate 15 to the north and Interstate 40 to the south. It was placed on the National Register of Historic Places, and along with the adjacent ghost town of Kelso, was declared a United States Historic District in 2000. The district was increased twice: in 2019 and 2025.

== History ==
=== Early years ===
The first depot, by the Los Angeles and Salt Lake Railroad, opened in 1905. In early 1923 the railroad began construction of the new "Kelso Clubhouse & Restaurant" which opened the next year. The Kelso Depot was built to provide services to passengers and railroad employees, and a water stop for the steam locomotives. It is an example of a surviving mid-1920s era Mission Revival and Spanish Colonial Revival architecture Styled railroad depot with a hotel, restaurant, and gardens in Southern California. It was designed by the firm of John and Donald Parkinson. The facility served interstate passenger and shipping traffic and the transport of ore from local mines, especially the Vulcan Mine. It was an essential element of the 1920s modernization of the Union Pacific Railroad stations to compete with the Santa Fe Railway and its Harvey Houses such as "Casa del Desierto".

The oasis-like landscape design and overall style and character of this remote station made it a popular gathering place for Union Pacific employees, passengers and local residents. The original gardens with shade from Fremont cottonwoods (Populus fremontii), Chinese elms (Ulmus parvifolia), and manicured geometric lawns lingered, but did not survive the desert conditions between depot closure and the park's Visitor Center restoration. Only date palms (Phoenix dactylifera) survived.

=== Mid-20th century ===
The Kelso Depot served as a significant element in the Union Pacific's contributions to the American war effort during World War II. The end of World War II marked the beginning of a long decline in the depot's utility. The sharp decline in the volume of freight traffic and diesel engines replacing steam caused a reduction in services and the need for fewer employees. The Vulcan Mine closed early in 1947, further reducing freight and passenger traffic. A surge of activity occurred with the outbreak of the Korean War in the early 1950s, resulting in a renewal of high traffic levels on the Union Pacific line for several years.

In 1953 and 1957, attempts were made to market the low-grade iron ore stockpiled at the Vulcan Mine. However, higher horse power, second generation diesel-electric locomotives of the 1960s resulted in the further decline in Union Pacific personnel needed at Kelso. This technological change eliminated the need for helper locomotives entirely in 1959. Coupled with the closing of the station agency and cessation of passenger train service to Kelso on August 14, 1964, this development spelled the end of the depot's principal function with the exception of the Lunch Room which remained serving until 1985.

=== Late 20th century to present ===
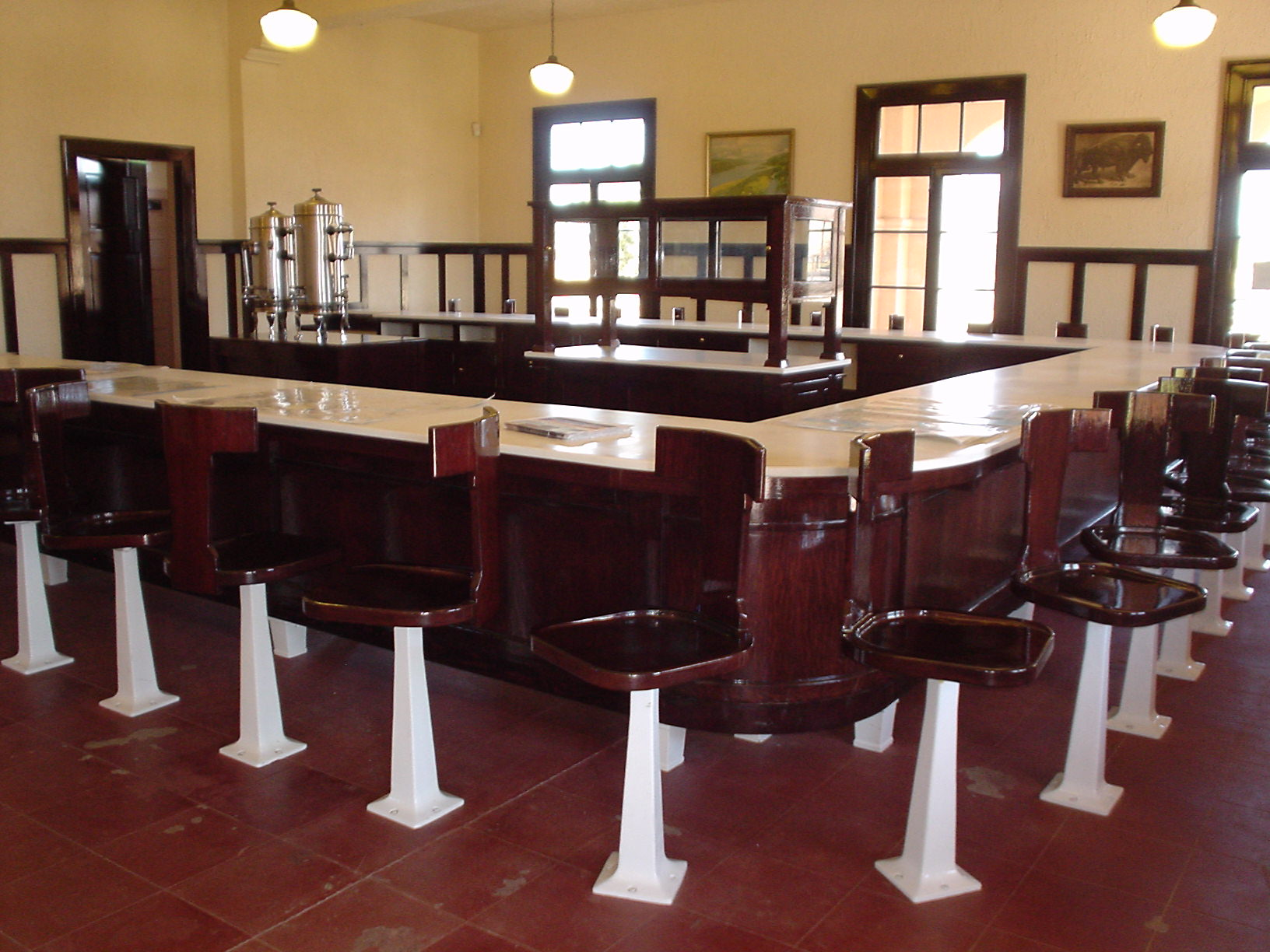
Restored Kelso Depot restaurant.

The Union Pacific proposed the demolition of the then unused depot in 1985. Efforts to preserve the building culminated in its 1992 transfer to the Bureau of Land Management and its East Mojave National Scenic Area.

In 1994 the Mojave National Preserve was established, and the depot was transferred to the National Park Service. A historical restoration and adaptive reuse project followed in 2002. The Kelso Depot now serves, since 2005, as the main Visitor Center of the Mojave National Preserve.

More renovations forced the Visitor Center to close again in 2023; it is expected to reopen in 2027.

== See also ==
- Cima Dome & Volcanic Field National Natural Landmark
- El Garces Hotel – Needles, California
- Harvey House Railroad Depot – Barstow, California
  - Western America Railroad Museum
- Kelso Dunes
- Kelso Mountains
- Lavic Lake volcanic field
  - Pisgah Crater

Preceding station	Union Pacific Railroad	Following station
Flynn toward Los Angeles	Los Angeles and Salt Lake Railroad	Hayden toward Salt Lake City
