= Willow Wash =

Willow Wash may be:

An ephemeral stream or wash in:

== Arizona ==
- Willow Wash (Lake Havasu, Colorado River), Mohave County, Arizona
- Willow Wash (San Pedro River), Cochise County, Arizona
- Willow Wash (Day Wash), Navajo County, Arizona

== California ==
- Willow Wash (Willow Creek), Inyo County, California
- Willow Wash (Seventeenmile Point, California) in San Bernardino County, California
- Willow Wash (Ivanpah Valley), near Nipton, in San Bernardino County, California

== Nevada ==
- Willow Wash (Coils Creek), Eureka County, Nevada
- Willow Wash (Cataract Wash), Clark County, Nevada

== New Mexico ==
- Willow Wash (Plumasano, Wash), Cibola County, New Mexico
- Willow Wash (Alamo Wash), San Juan County, New Mexico
