= Roy's Motel and Café =

Coordinates: 34.558982°N 115.743917°W

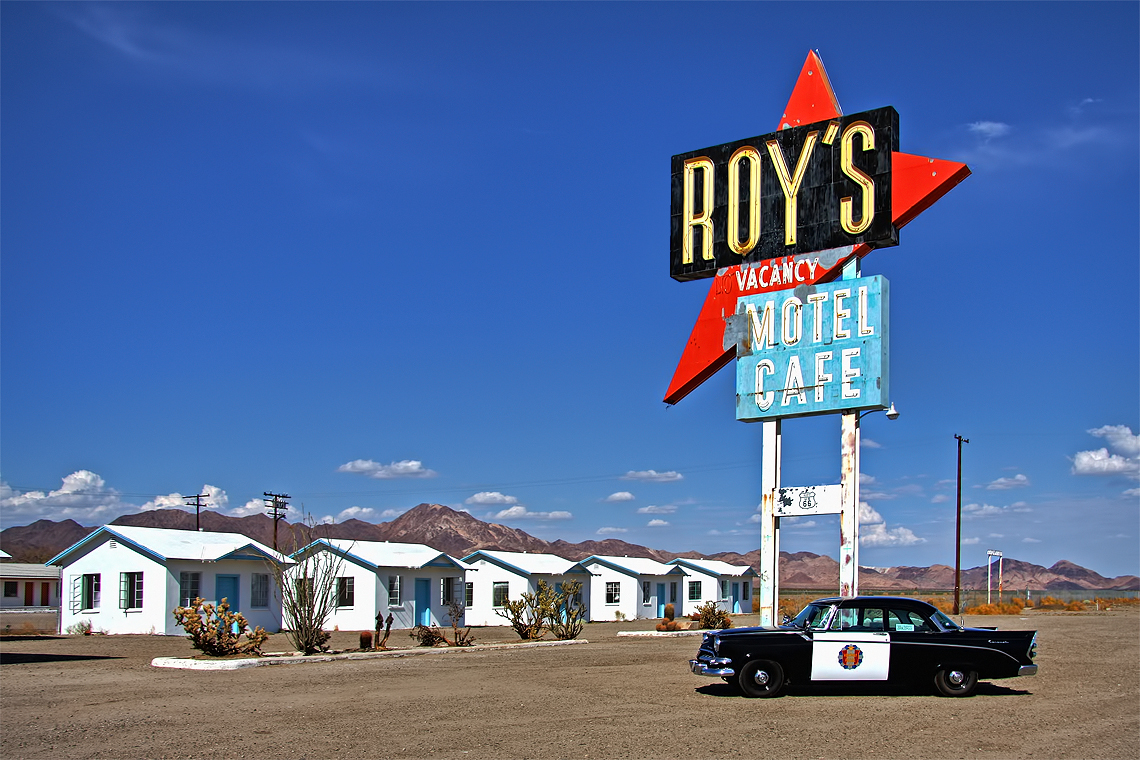
- Roy's Motel and Café in Amboy, California on U.S. Route 66 in California in the Mojave Desert, in 2012
- Interactive map of the Roy's Motel and Café area

General information
- Architectural style: Googie
- Location: Amboy, California, United States
- Completed: 1938

Roy's Motel and Café is a motel, café, gas station, and auto repair shop on the National Trails Highway, the former U.S. Route 66, in the Mojave Desert town of Amboy in San Bernardino County, California. It has been defunct for years, but is now being restored. The historic site is an example of roadside Mid-Century Modern Googie architecture. The entire town of Amboy—including the Roy's complex—is owned by and under the stewardship of a private preservationist.

== History ==
=== As a Route 66 stop ===
In 1938, Roy Crowl opened Roy's as a gas and service station along U.S. Highway 66 in Amboy. At the time, Route 66, which was known as the "Main Street of America," was the primary east-west highway in the nation, starting in Chicago and ending in the Southwest and Los Angeles. The construction of Roy's was one consequence of the highway's 1931 realignment through Mountain Springs Summit, which made the road bypass Goffs, California to directly connect Needles and Essex and continue west to Amboy.

In the 1940s, Crowl teamed up with his son-in-law, Herman "Buster" Burris. They expanded the business to include a café, an auto repair garage, and an auto court of small cabins for overnight rental by Route 66 travelers. Buster Burris himself created the town's infrastructure, almost single-handedly, some of which remains semi-functioning now. Burris also brought power to Amboy and Roy's from Barstow by erecting his own poles and wires alongside Route 66, using an old Studebaker pickup truck.

Postwar business was profitable, as customers traveled with cars after the World War II years of tire and gasoline rationing and new cars not being manufactured. During that time, Roy Crowl and Burris kept Roy's Garage and Café operating constantly; as a result, Burris posted classified advertisements in newspapers across the country to recruit people to help.

By the beginning of the 1950s, Roy's complex employed up to 70 people; the town's entire population then was 700.

Some aesthetic changes came to Roy's Motel and Café in 1959, such as the February 1 erection of the neon boomerang sign, which was visible for miles for those approaching Amboy; as well as the construction of the motel's new Mid-Century modern guest reception, which was described as appearing similar to an "inclined roof flying over a glassed wedge," and its office-themed building style.

=== After Interstate 40 ===
The 1972 opening of Interstate 40, which was unconnected to as well as a distance north of Amboy's section of Route 66, meant a literal overnight loss of business. Burris himself was quoted as saying that his business "went down to zero" the day I-40 opened. Roy Crowl died in 1977, with Buster Burris continuing the business for less travelers on Route 66. Burris was known to have prejudices against "rowdy bikers and men with long hair" and chased off many "unacceptable patrons" at gunpoint.

During Amboy's decline, Roy's Motel and Café became the town's only business other than a post office and Bristol Dry Lake's chloride works; it continued to attract visitors, including some public figures, after the town's decline.

=== Timothy White period ===
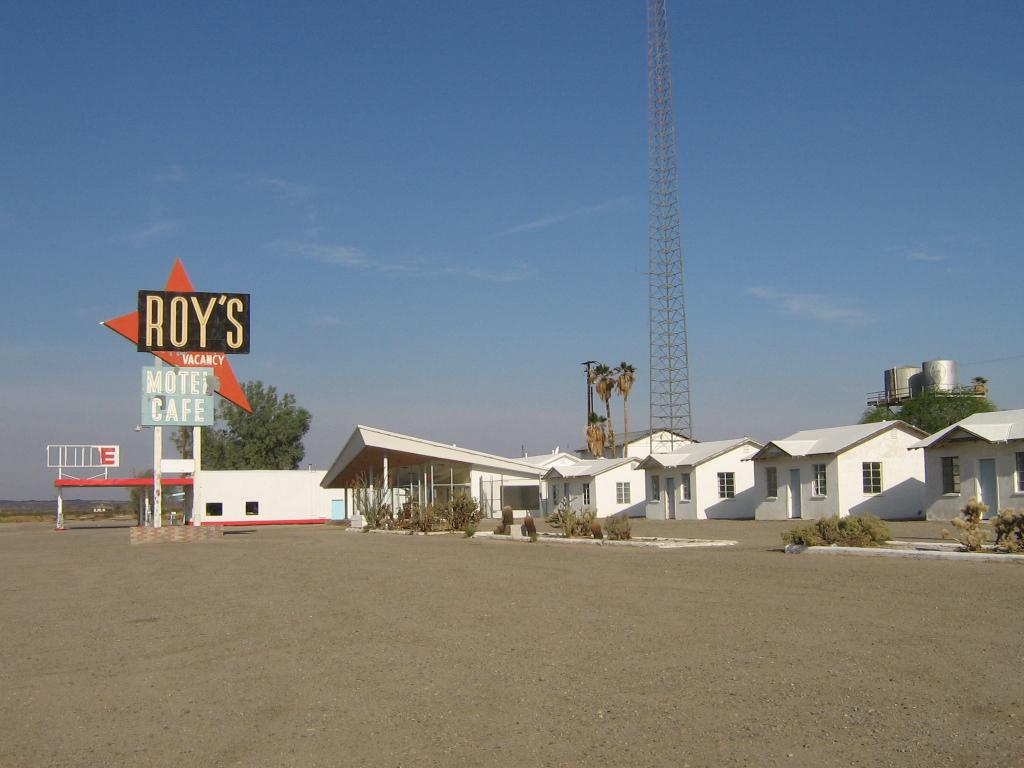
Roy's Cafe & Motel in 2007

In 1995, Timothy White leased the entire town of Amboy from Buster Burris. White was a New York photographer who saw value in maintaining the property in a weathered, worn condition as a filming location. White made a contract with his friend from high school, Walt Wilson, to manage the property, and later purchased the town from Burris in February 2000 for $710,000 USD. Buster Burris died later that year at the age of 91 on August 10, 2000.

Wilson and White continued to sell gasoline, food, and Route 66 souvenirs at Roy's. However, it operated for a shorter period of time, had a limited menu, had management that was reportedly surly to visitors, and had increased gasoline and water costs due to the facility's location and pricing. Reportedly, a single glass of tap water in the café cost $1.00 USD. Timothy White offered Amboy for sale on eBay in 2003, but the property remained unsold.

== Restoration ==
The property went into foreclosure for repossession in February 2005, with White and Wilson relinquishing control and returning ownership of Amboy to Bessie, Buster Burris's widow. She offered all the property for sale "on the San Bernardino County courthouse steps," but no bidders came. In March 2005, with the help of her granddaughter, Bonnie Barnes, Bessie declared the town to be for sale for one week, with the property being sold to the highest bidder that Friday at noon.

The town was sold to Southern California preservation patron Albert Okura, after he made a pledge to Bessie Burris to restore Roy's, keep its original Route 66 aesthetic, reopen it, and to open a new museum showcasing Amboy's history. Okura acquired approximately 950 acres, which contained the town and Roy's Motel and Café, for $425,000 on May 3, 2005.

Okura, who also owned the Juan Pollo chain restaurants, faced challenges in getting the town's electricity and water services restored and operative. Okura's restoration challenges predominantly involved Amboy's infrastructure, most of which had been laid by Buster Burris himself and which was not to current building codes. Bessie Burris continued to visit and work with Okura, collecting memorabilia for the town and Roy's until her death at the age of 91 on May 17, 2008, in nearby Wonder Valley, California.

Okura had experience with preservationist efforts and stewardship, as the owner of the Original McDonald's in San Bernardino, California, which he operated as a museum. Unlike Wilson and White, who wanted to maintain Roy's and Amboy in a "weathered" condition for use in film shoots, Okura planned to fully restore Roy's as a "nostalgia tourist" destination and Route 66 rest stop for travelers en route to and from Colorado River recreation areas before his death. However, Albert Okura died before finishing the project, so he passed it to his son, Kyle Okura.

=== Reopening ===
The coffee shop and gas station at Roy's were refurbished and reopened on April 28, 2008. The Roy's Motel and Café repair, renovation, and restoration costs so far have amounted to over US$1,000,000.00. While the station's gasoline is still considered to be expensive, owing to delivery costs, its price is below that of gasoline when White and Wilson owned Roy's. Albert Okura also had plans to open a Roy's Café and mini-mart at the same location, although a lack of potable water supplies kept the café's kitchen closed.

A 2013 Kickstarter campaign proposed to restore the Roy's neon sign, as part of a larger project through which a newly established Amboy Foundation of Art proposes to restore the abandoned motel as a place in the desert where artists could find solitude and inspiration.

== In popular culture ==
Actors Harrison Ford and Anthony Hopkins, who had autographed photos on the restaurant's wall, visited Roy's when their schedules allowed them to. Ford frequently flew in, landing his plane on the adjacent Amboy Airfield, which was one of the first airports in California.

Part of the 1986 motion picture The Hitcher, which included Rutger Hauer in its cast, was filmed in Roy's Gas Bar. Both the reception area and the neon sign helped establish the setting for a 1999 television commercial for Qwest Communications. It was also used in an Enrique Iglesias music video for Hero, which was one of his singles. In September 1993, Kalifornia, which was filmed in Amboy and starring Brad Pitt, was released.

In 1978, Buster Burris married Bessie Van deVeer, a local artist who brought her love of the desert and personality to Amboy. Roses were painted on the side of the preparation table in Roy's kitchen; they are now visible in The Hitcher. Burris and his wife continued to manage the town together until 1995.

The music video for the 2000 single "The Lost Art of Keeping a Secret" features Roy's. The rock band that created the song, Queens of the Stone Age, has members who are from the California desert.

Roy's was described fondly as a place which Neil Peart, Rush's drummer, would stay on his motorcycle journey in his book Ghost Rider.

In 2008, Roy's was used as the background of Sky identifications of "Twister".

Beneath the Dark, a 2010 American mystery-thriller film directed by Chad Feehan that starred Josh Stewart, Jamie-Lynn Sigler, and Chris Browning, was filmed primarily at Roy's.

The 2010 racing video game Blur featured Roy's as part of a level set in Amboy.

In 2013, Armin Van Buuren filmed portions of his music video for the song "This Is What It Feels Like" in Amboy. Producer Thomas Wise also filmed a national TV commercial for Lucas Oil Products & Lucas Oil Stabilizer at Roy's Motel and Cafe, along with other locations in southern California.

Part of the 2015 motion picture Southbound was filmed at Roy's Motel and Café. The location is featured in the first story in the movie, “The Way Out,” and returns in the final story, “The Way In.”

Bob Dylan's painting of the Roy's sign is currently being exhibited as one of 180 pieces of his in Miami.

The café was a stop during Japanese rickshaw driver Yuji Suzuki's 2019 attempt to run the length of Route 66.

A 2022 Nissan commercial that was seen during the NCAA men's and women's basketball tournaments, which featured collegiate mascots, was filmed at and near the motel.

In 2022, Olivia Rodrigo performed the song "Traitor" from her debut album, Sour, at Roy's for the documentary Olivia Rodrigo: Driving Home 2 U.

Canadian singer/musician JJ Wilde used footage filmed around Roy's for the music video for her 2024 single "Arizona".

== See also ==
- Amboy Crater
- California Route 66 Museum
- List of motels
