= Albert Okura =

American businessman (1951–2023)

- Born: December 3, 1951; Los Angeles, California, U.S.
- Died: January 27, 2023 (aged 71); Ontario, California, U.S.
- Occupations: Businessman; philanthropist
- Known for: Founding Juan Pollo; Route 66 philanthropy
- Spouse: Sella Oei
- Children: 3

Albert Okura (December 3, 1951 – January 27, 2023) was an American businessman who was the founder and CEO of the Juan Pollo restaurant chain in Southern California. He was also a philanthropist and was active in the revitalization of Historic Route 66. In 2005, Okura purchased the town of Amboy, California, which is located along Route 66. The corporate headquarters for the Juan Pollo chain now sits on the original location of the first McDonald's restaurant where Okura created and hosted a museum, preserving artifacts and memorabilia about the landmark.

== Early life ==
Okura, a third-generation (or sansei) Japanese American, was born in 1951 in the Wilmington section of Los Angeles. His first full-time job was with Burger King in 1970, which led to managerial positions in the chain as well as Del Taco, and ultimately founding his own Mexican-influenced chicken rotisserie chain.

In 1981, while working for Del Taco in Carson, an El Pollo Loco opened near him. At the time El Pollo Loco was a new char-broiled Mexican chicken chain. Okura tried the restaurant and was impressed with the food and the simplicity of its operations and began to investigate opening his own restaurant.

== Juan Pollo ==
Okura's uncle initially invested in his idea to open a restaurant and made Okura aware of a restaurant location in a shopping mall he owned in Ontario, California. This location would become the first location for his restaurant. Armando Parra, Okura's brother in law, was the creator of the recipe of Juan Pollo. Parra grew up in an area of Chihuahua, Mexico where rotisserie chicken restaurants are popular. Okura looked into opening the restaurant. However, Parra told Okura the restaurant was not big enough for the grills and suggested rotisserie cooking instead.

The first location opened in January 1984. Sales were initially modest, but it wasn't until the opening of the chain's second location in 1986 that became popular, due in large part to a food review written by Norman Baffry, a food critic for The San Bernardino Sun.

As of 2023, there are 25 Juan Pollo locations in Southern California, most of them in the Inland Empire. Okura aspired to turn Juan Pollo into a national and ultimately, an international chain.

Juan Pollo hosts an annual Veteran's Day Parade and Car Show in front of corporate headquarters in San Bernardino and the company has been one of the main toy contributors for the annual Christmas toy give away in the city.

== Route 66 restoration ==
Okura purchased the location of the original McDonald's restaurant, opened by Dick and Mac McDonald in 1948, which was being foreclosed on in 1998 for the sum of $135,000. The restaurant, located in San Bernardino, California, had been demolished, but Okura recognized the property and moved his corporate headquarters to the site, which he described as "destiny." He also opened an unofficial McDonald's museum next to his headquarters.

In addition, in 2005 he bought the town of Amboy, California, located on Route 66, for $425,000. Okura's plans include improvements for tourists interested in and traveling along the highway and building a museum. He reopened the gas station in 2008, after $100,000 worth of renovations to the building housing the gas station, diner, and café. Counting on the traffic from a renewed interest in traveling Route 66, the gas station is stocked with candy and souvenirs.

== Personal life and death ==
Okura and his wife, the former Sella Oei, had three children. In 2014, he self-published his autobiography Albert Okura: The Chicken Man with a 50 Year Plan.

After a series of health problems, Okura died from sepsis in Ontario, California, on January 27, 2023, at the age of 71.
