= Amboy Airfield =

Coordinates: 34.558982°N 115.743917°W

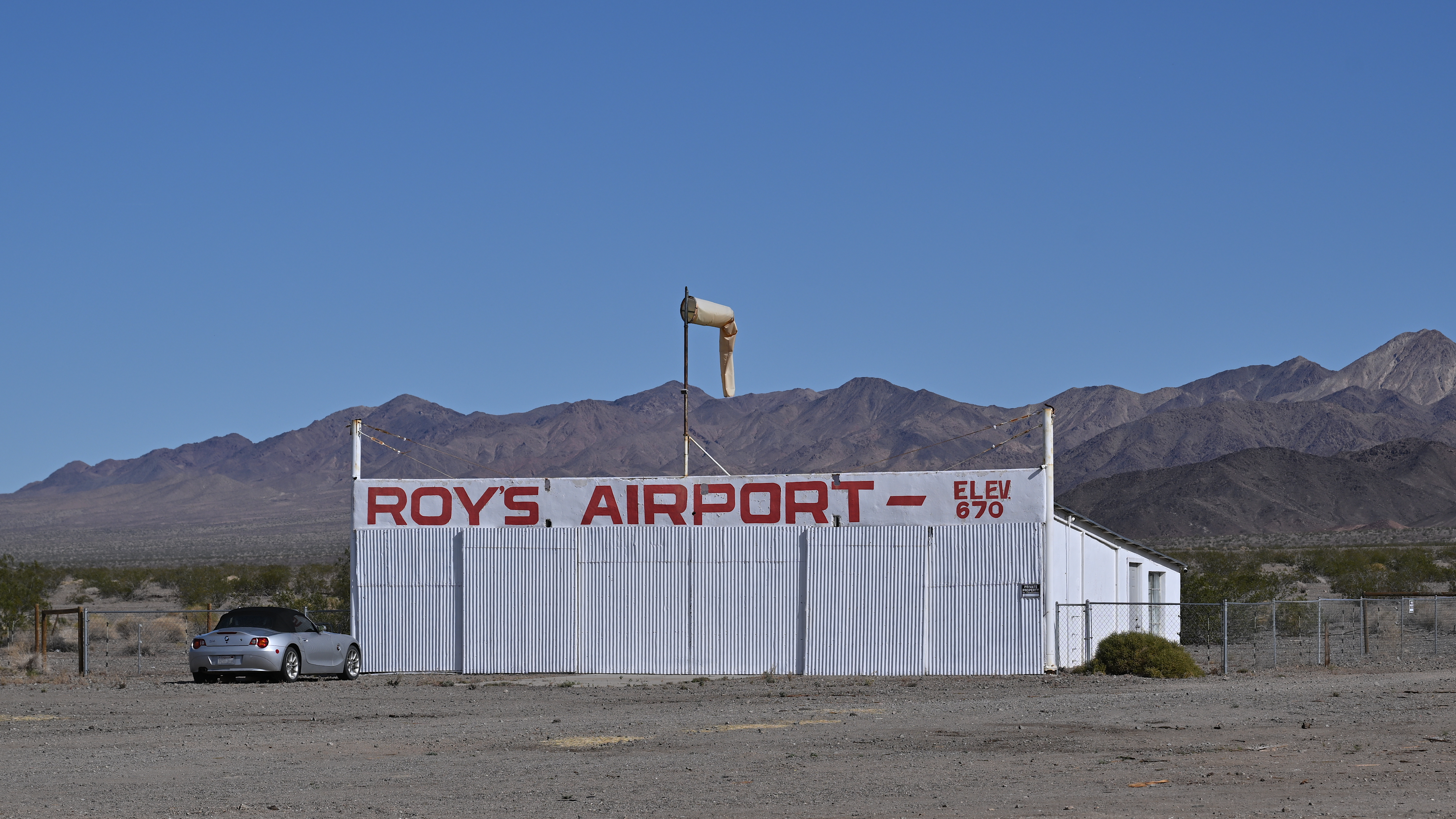
- IATA: none; ICAO: none

Summary
- Airport type: Private
- Serves: Amboy, California
- Location: Roy's Motel and Café, Amboy, Route 66, California
- Interactive map of Amboy Airfield

Runways
Direction	Length		Surface
Direction	m	ft	Surface
32R/14L	1,127	3,698	Dirt/Gravel
32L/14R	871	2,858	Dirt/Gravel
27/09	426	1,398	Dirt/Gravel

Amboy Airfield is an abandoned airport in the area of Amboy, California, which was used primarily during World War II. The exact date of the airport's opening is undetermined even though the earliest reference to the airfield was published on June 5, 1925, in the Oxnard Daily Courier.

Airplanes occasionally fly in.

== See also ==
- List of defunct airports in the United States
