= Willow Wash (Seventeenmile Point, California) =

Willow Wash is an ephemeral stream or wash in San Bernardino County, California. Its mouth is west northwest of Seventeen Mile Point at an elevation of 1,519 feet / 463 meters. From Seventeen Mile Point, its course breaks up into several distributary washes that run west and southwest toward Soda Lake. The wash has its source at an elevation of 1379 feet, at 35°11′42″N 115°40′50″W north of the Marl Mountains. It runs southwest with heavy sands south and west of the Cima Volcanic Range and Volcanic Fields, parallels Kelbaker Road, turning northward until it reaches Seventeen Mile Point.
