= Seventeen Mile Point =

Mountain in California, US

Coordinates: 35°12′46″N 115°53′24″W

Location of Seventeen Mile Point within the state of California.

Seventeen Mile Point is a mountain at the north end of the Old Dad Mountains in San Bernardino County, California. Its summit is at an altitude of 2,500 feet / 760 meters.

== History ==
Seventeen Mile Point acquired its name because the northernmost ridge of the mountain was a landmark along the Mojave Road or Old Government Road. This ridge at which the Mojave Road rounded this northern tip of the Old Dad Mountains was called Point of Mountain. Odometer surveys by the U. S. Army in 1866 and 1867 found that Point of Mountain was about 17 miles (27 km) away from both Soda Springs and Marl Springs, watering places along the road, and marked the point where the old wagon road turned southwest to follow the course of Willow Wash for several miles upstream.

Seventeen Mile Point, a mining camp, now a vanished ghost town, was established there at Point of Mountain in 1900 to support the Paymaster, Brannigan, and Oro Fino Mines, among others, in the Old Dad Mountains to the south. The name of this mining camp that vanished after 1914, was memorialized in the name of the mountain.
