= Juan Pollo =

Restaurant chain in Southern California

Juan Pollo Franchise Corporation
- Type: Private
- Industry: Restaurant
- Founded: 1984; 42 years ago in Ontario, California, United States
- Founder: Albert Okura
- Headquarters: San Bernardino, California, United States
- Number of locations: 25 restaurants (2023)
- Area served: Southern California
- Key people: Albert Okura Founder
- Products: Rotisserie chicken

Juan Pollo is a Mexican-style rotisserie chicken restaurant chain headquartered in San Bernardino, California founded in 1984 by Albert Okura. Its restaurants are located mostly in the Inland Empire region of Southern California, with other locations in Riverside, San Bernardino and Orange counties.

== History ==
Okura, originally a native of Wilmington, California, held a number of managerial positions in fast-food restaurants in the area for Burger King and Del Taco in the '70s and '80s. While serving as the manager for a Del Taco in Carson, California, in 1981, an El Pollo Loco opened opposite of his restaurant.

He was impressed by the chain's char-broiled chicken and the simplicity of its operations. As he investigated what his options were to opening a chicken char-broiled restaurant, he met Armando Parra, who mentioned his area of Chihuahua, Mexico, had many rotisserie style chicken restaurants.

Okura located a restaurant location in Ontario, California, but Parra believed the location was too small for char-broiled and suggested using rotisserie cooking instead. Okura changed his plans to rotisserie chicken and opened the first Juan Pollo in January 1984. Sales for the first day were $165, but Okura refined the operations of the restaurant, including what chicken sizes worked best, cooking time and flame temperature.

Juan Pollo's second location opened in San Bernardino in January 1986. The restaurant also received a favorable review from Norman Baffry, a food critic for The San Bernardino Sun, which increased the popularity of the two restaurants.

Okura trained his hourly employees to become future Juan Pollo owner/operators, and most of the restaurants are owned by former employees of the chain.

== Philanthropy ==
In 1998, Okura purchased the location of the original McDonald's, opened in 1948, for $135,000 in a foreclosure sale.

Okura relocated his corporate offices to the location, and opened an unofficial McDonald's museum on the site. Okura refers to the location as the "historic site of the original McDonald's," due to legal issues with McDonald's. Okura didn't plan to open the museum; it was a news item incorrectly stating that he was planning on opening a museum which gave him the idea.

Juan Pollo has become involved with the revival of Route 66, hosting its own annual Veteran's Day Parade and Car Show in front of the unofficial McDonald's Museum. Juan Pollo also has been one of the main toy contributors for the annual Christmas toy give away at the Route 66 park at La Placita on Mt. Vernon Avenue in San Bernardino.

Okura also purchased the town of Amboy, California, on Route 66 in 2005 for $425,000. Okura worked to improve the town, with plans to add a museum and making it a destination for those who are interested in Route 66.

== See also ==
- List of fast-food chicken restaurants
