= Marl Mountains =

Mountain range in the American state of California

Coordinates: 35°09′37″N 115°40′25″W

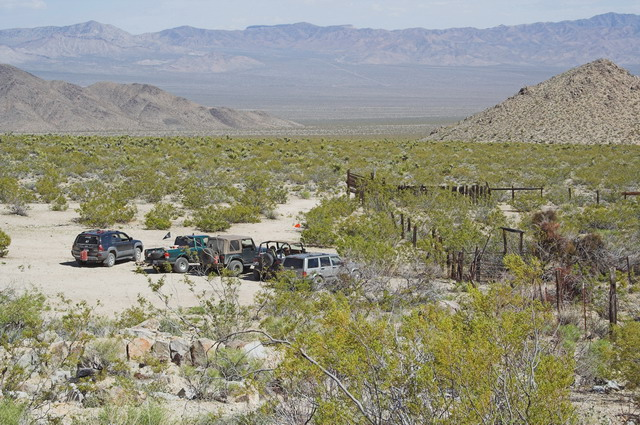
Southward view from Marl Springs on the east side of the Marl Mountains.

The Marl Mountains are located in the Mojave National Preserve in eastern California in the United States, northeast of the Kelso Mountains. The Marl Mountains lie just east of Kelbaker Road, which connects the town of Baker with the small community of Kelso, California.

Like the Beale Mountains to the east, the range is one of the smallest mountain ranges in the nation, and is only about four miles long.

The Marl Mountains are often visited by travelers on the historic Mojave Road wagon trail, which passes Marl Spring on the east side of the mountains. Marl Spring was an important source of water to travelers crossing the dry Mojave Desert. The cistern at Marl Spring is still often full of water today, although the water should be treated by a water filter before drinking it.
