= Chambless, California =

Chambless
- Ghost town
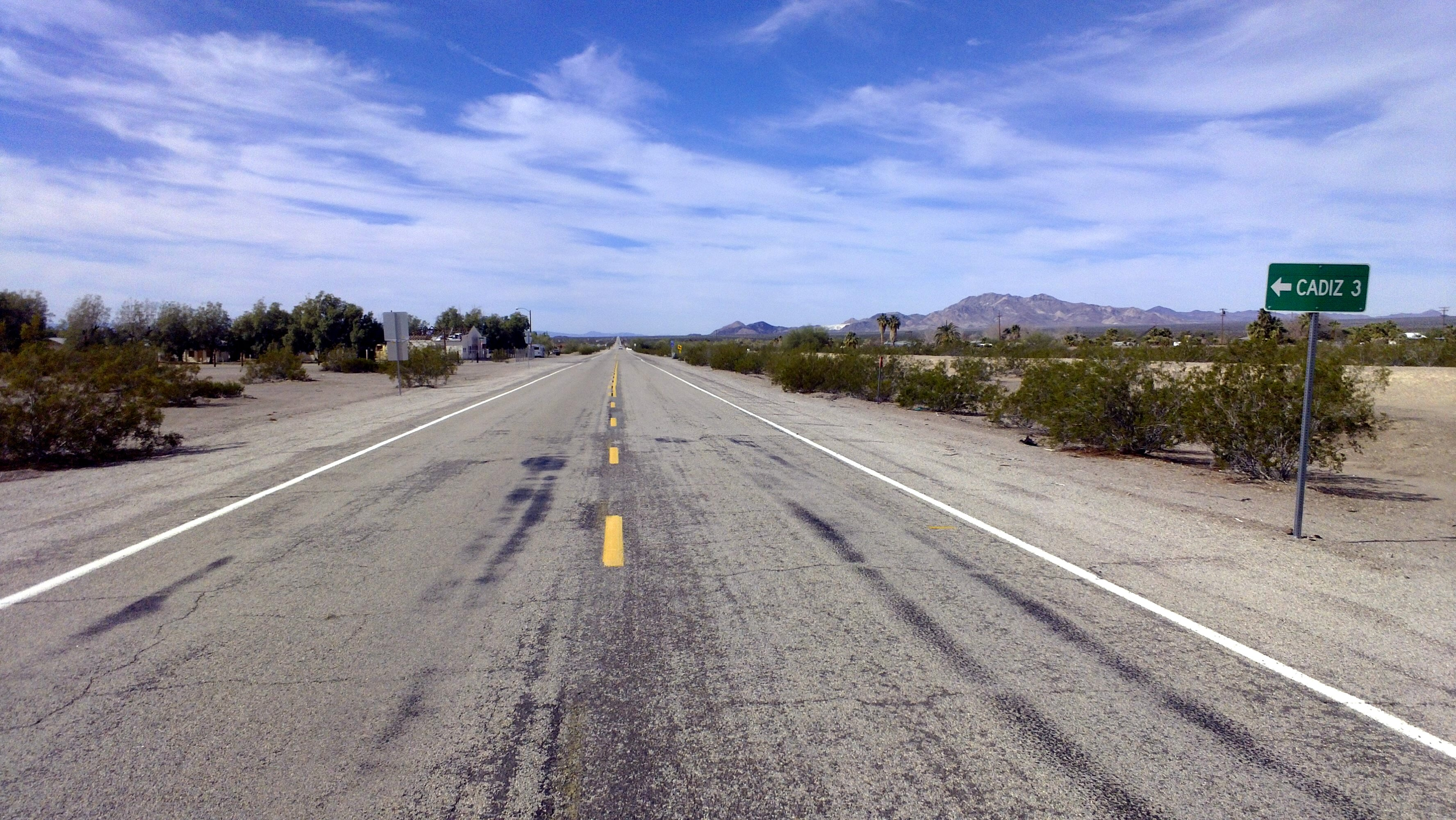
- The National Trails Highway (and historic Route 66) as seen in Chambless, close to the road heading to Cadiz

- Location within the state of California Chambless (the United States)
- Coordinates: 34°33′41″N 115°32′41″W
- Country: United States
- State: California
- County: San Bernardino
- Time zone: UTC-8 (Pacific (PST))
  - Summer (DST): UTC-7 (PDT)
- ZIP codes: 92319
- Area code: 760
- GNIS feature ID: 240463

Chambless is a ghost town in the Mojave Desert of San Bernardino County, California, United States, south of Interstate 40 on the historic Route 66.

Chambless is east of the Bullion Mountains and Ludlow and ten miles east of Amboy Crater and Amboy, California. The ZIP Code is 92319, and the community is inside area code 760. It is 3 miles north of the railroad town of Cadiz.

== History ==
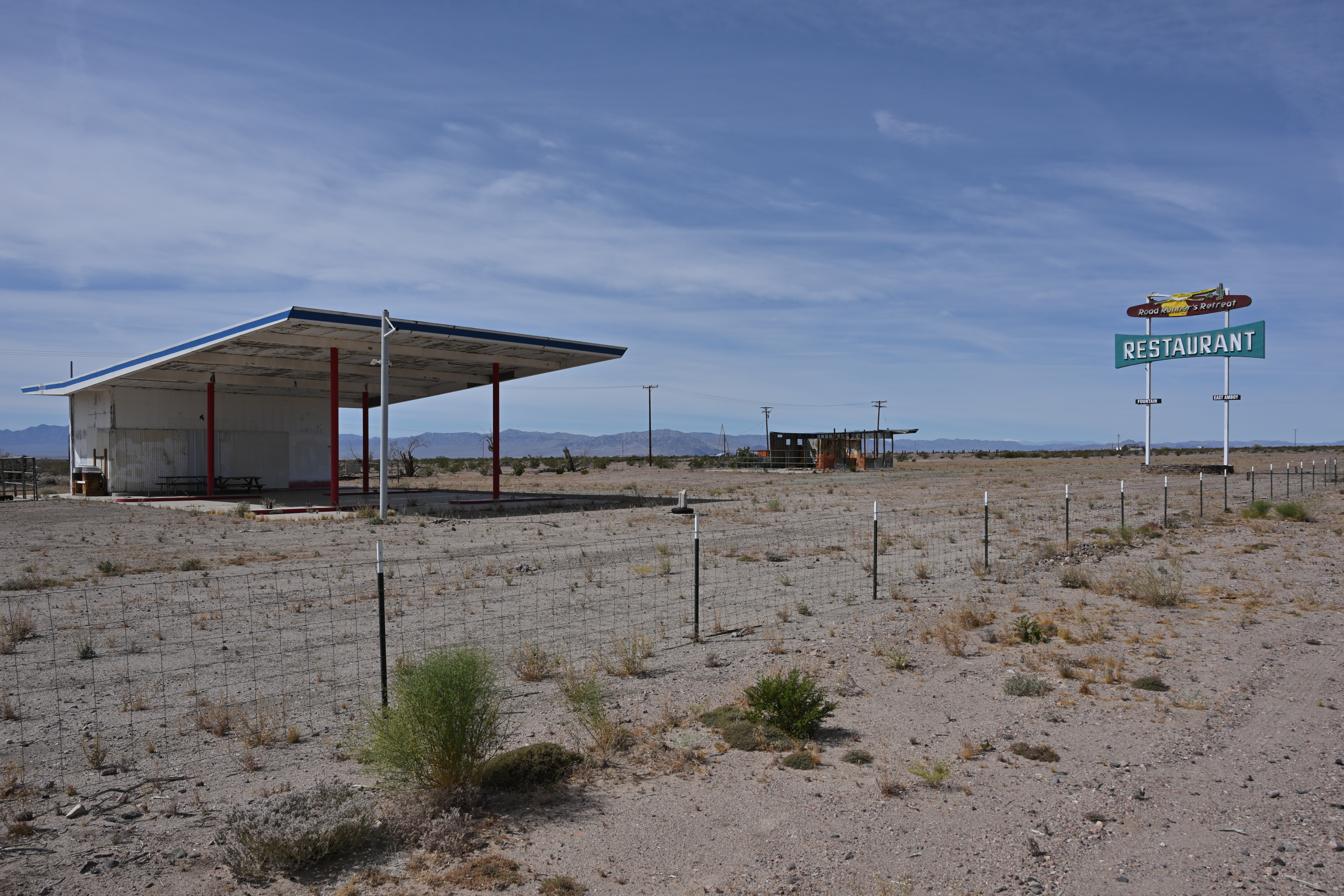
Road Runner's Retreat, gas station and restaurant

Chambless, originally known as Chambless Station, is one of the "alphabet towns" located along U.S. Route 66 that provided water towers to service the Atchison, Topeka and Santa Fe Railway. It became a popular motorist and tourist stop for Route 66 travelers but has essentially disappeared since the opening of I-40 in 1973.

In 2005, the population of Chambless was 6 residents and one dog, as posted on a sign entering the town. There is a Historical Landmark Marker just east of the town that explains the history of the alphabet towns.

Also located in Chambless was the 'Roadrunner Cafe' with its large and tall sign, which finally closed its doors sometime in the 1970s.
