= Old Dad Mountains =

Mountain range in California, United States

- Location within California

Highest point
- Elevation: 884 m (2,900 ft)

Geography
- Country: United States
- State: California
- District: San Bernardino County
- Range coordinates: 34°46′32.961″N 115°49′56.002″W
- Topo map: USGS Budweiser Wash

The Old Dad Mountains are a mountain range in San Bernardino County, California.

The range is named for Joseph "Old Dad" Wallace, a rail worker turned prospector from nearby Kelso. Accused of the murder of his fiancée, he left town and supported himself through mining the mountain range with his team of donkeys.
