= Latham Shale =

Geologic formation in California

- Stratigraphic range: Cambrian
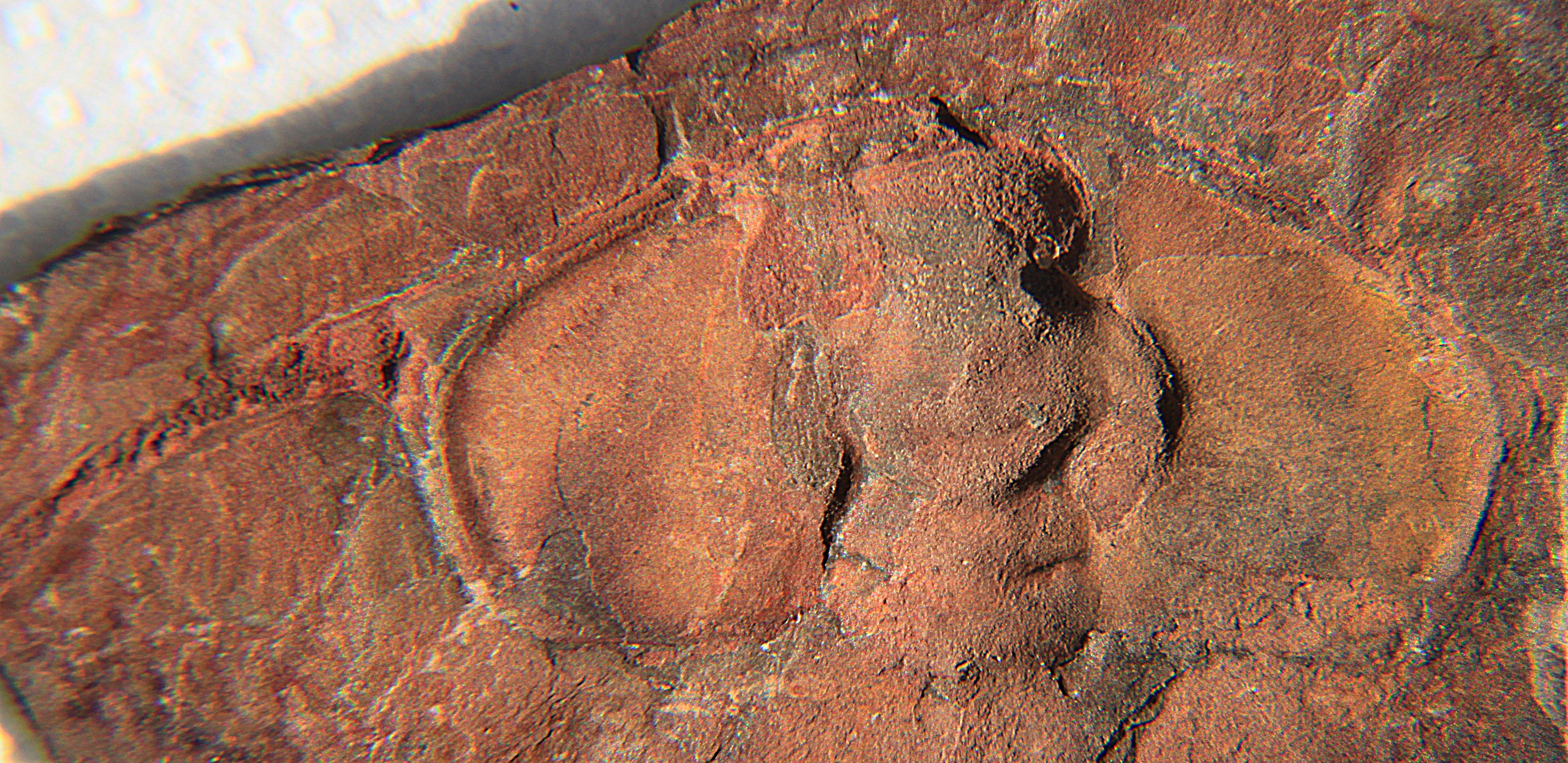
- Type: Geologic formation
- Overlies: Prospect Mountain Quartzite
- Thickness: 15–24 metres (49–79 ft)

Location
- Region: San Bernardino County, California
- Country: United States

The Latham Shale is a geologic formation in California. It contains some of the most important examples of Lower Cambrian trilobites in the world. Fossils of 12 different species of trilobite and 9 other Cambrian invertebrates, including articulate brachiopods and Anomalocaris appendages, have been found in the formation. Fossil veins are so thick that in certain places nearly every rock contains trilobite fossils, making it a destination for trilobite collectors worldwide. Oncolite fossils are also found in significant quantities.

Due to the fragmentary nature of most trilobites found in the formation, it may represent a trilobite molting ground or just an area where ocean currents brought dead trilobite exoskeletons. Latham shale is the primary rock formation in the southern Marble Mountains of the Mojave Desert where it is found in deposits 15–24 metres (49–79 ft) thick.

== See also ==
- List of fossiliferous stratigraphic units in California
- Paleontology in California
