= Kelso Dunes =

Dunefield in the Mojave Desert, United States

- Dune field
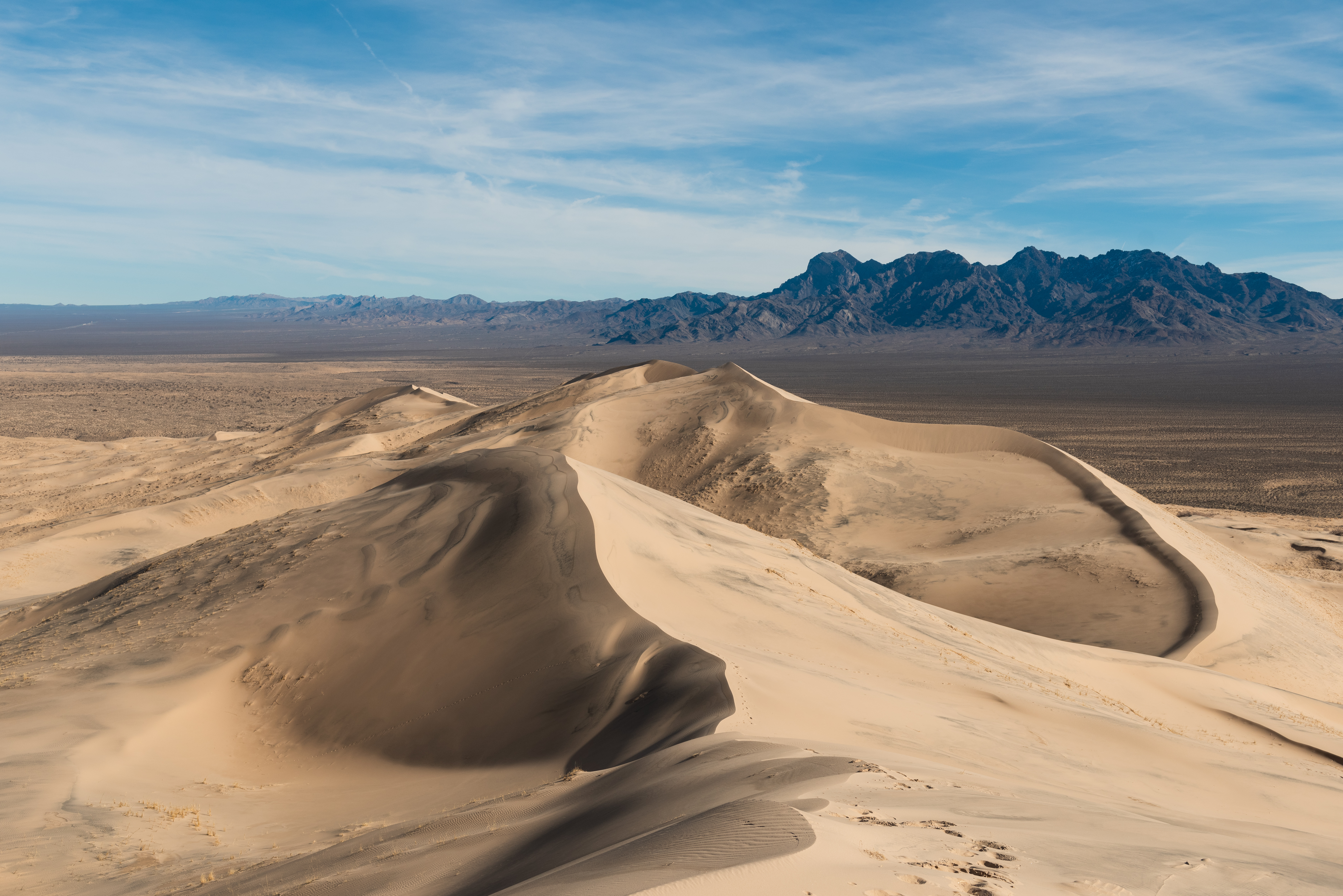
- Kelso Dunes at Mojave National Preserve, California

- Location within California
- Coordinates: 34°54′13″N 115°43′05″W

Area
  - Total: 45 sq mi (120 km^{2})

Dimensions
  - Height: 650 ft (200 m)
- Elevation: 3,074 ft (937 m)

Kelso Dunes, also known as the Kelso Dune Field, is the largest field of aeolian sand deposits in the Mojave Desert. The region is protected by the Mojave National Preserve and is located near the preserve's visitor center at Kelso Depot. The nearest communities are Baker and Ludlow, and the closest city is Barstow.

The dune field covers 45 square miles (120 km^{2}) and includes migrating dunes, vegetation-stabilized dunes, sand sheets, and sand ramps. The tallest dunes rise up to 650 feet (200 m) above the surrounding terrain.

== Geology ==
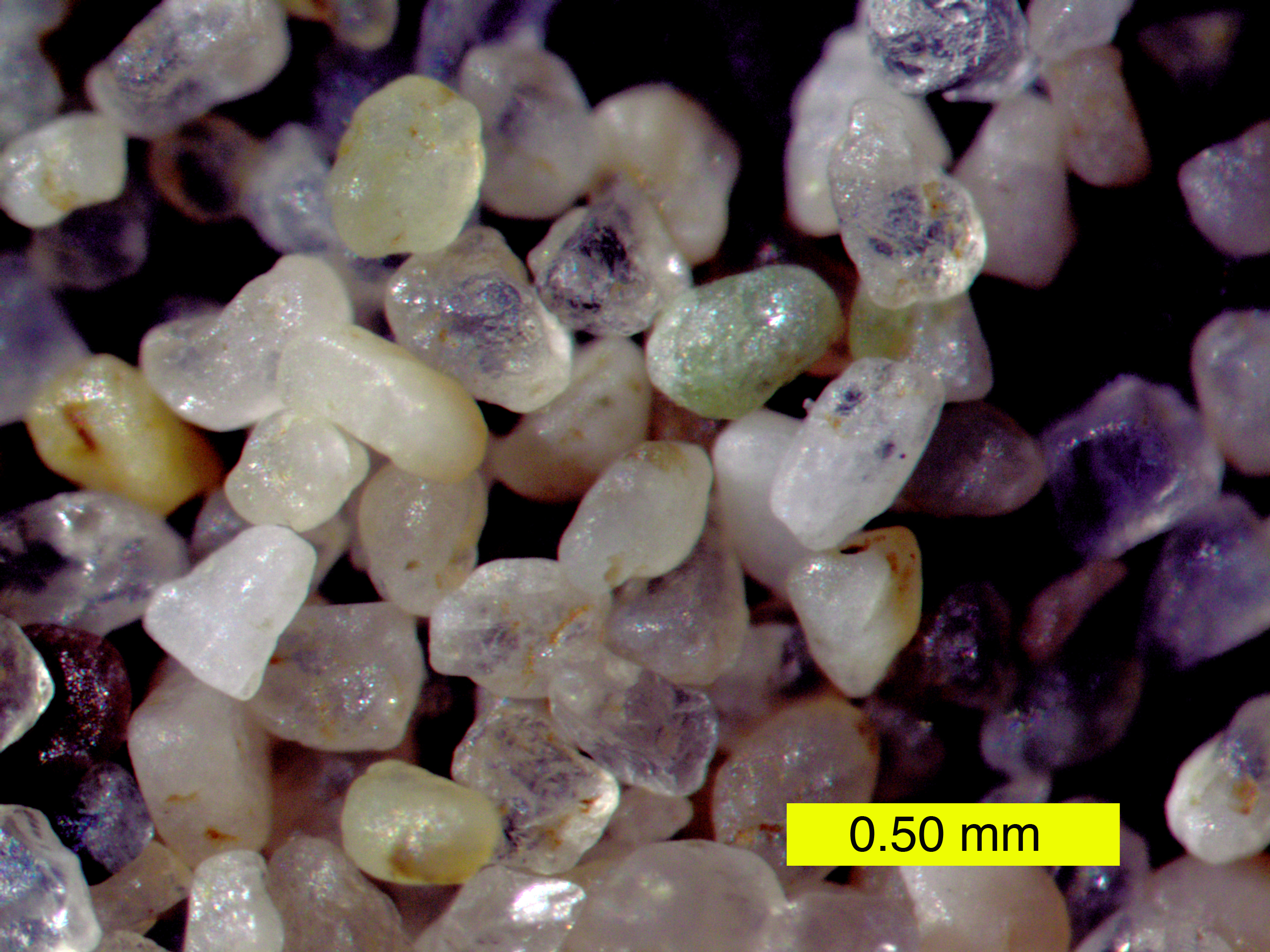
Sand from the Kelso Dunes

The dunes are composed predominantly of light-colored quartz and feldspar, most likely eroded from the granitics of the San Bernardino Mountains to the southwest. Magnetite and amphibole can also be found, often accumulating at the dune crests.

Kelso Dunes represent part of a much larger sand transport system, which includes the nearby Devils Playground region. The composition and morphology of the sand grains indicate that most originated from the Mojave River sink near Afton Canyon, which lies to the west of the dunes' current location. The sand has accumulated at the southeastern end of the Soda Lake-Kelso basin, where the Granite Mountains and Providence Mountains form a barrier to prevailing winds. At present, only the area around the Mojave River sink and the westernmost parts of Devil's Playground are receiving new sand through this system; sand is no longer accumulating at Kelso Dunes itself.

== Geography ==
The Kelso Dunes are composed of five stacked sets of dunes, each set corresponding to a period of climate change over the last 25,000 years. During dry climate episodes, a decrease in stabilizing vegetation exposed surface sand to wind erosion, which ultimately brought the sand to the dunes (most of the eastern part of the Kelso dunes was formed when nearby Soda Lake and Silver Lake dried into their current playas). However, once the sand was emplaced, vegetation began to grow, locking much of it into place.

The Kelso Dunes are also notable for the phenomenon known as singing sand, or "booming dunes". Enthusiasts sometimes climb to the top of the dunes and slide down slowly, generating a low-frequency rumble that can be both felt and heard. This effect has also been noted at the Eureka Dunes in California, Sand Mountain in Nevada, and the Booming Dunes in the Namib Desert of Africa. The booming is much more pronounced when the dunes are extremely dry.

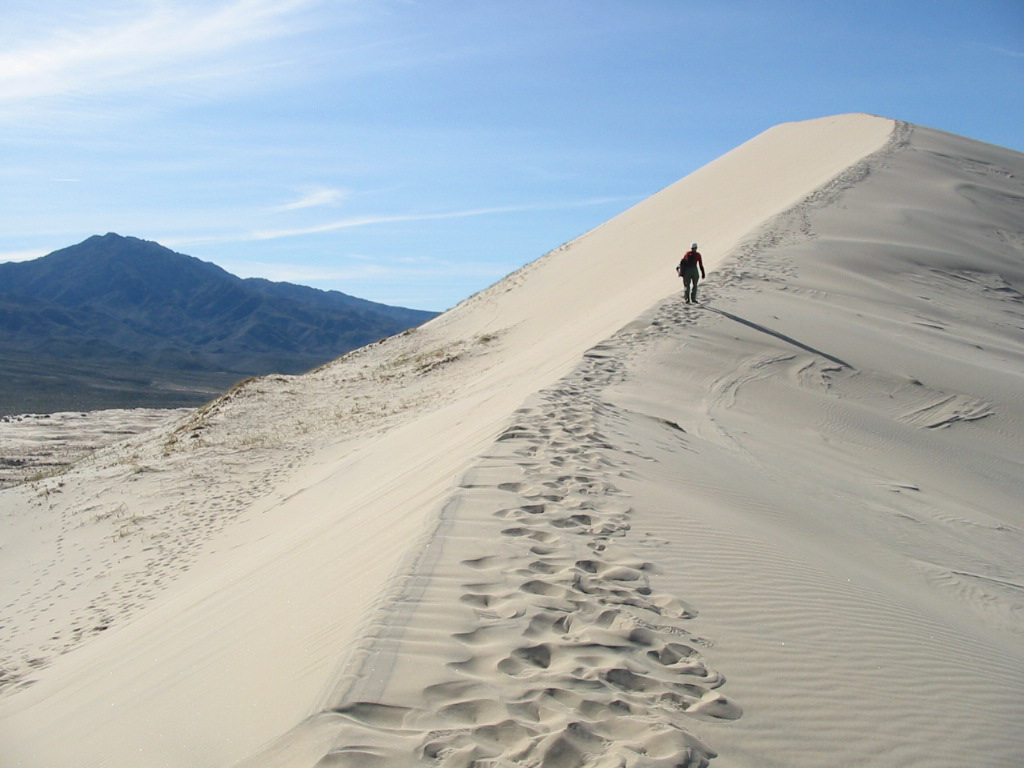
Hiking to the top

== Access ==
Kelso Dunes are closed to any vehicles, but are completely open to hikers. The trailhead is at the end of a three-mile (5 km) graded dirt road splitting from Kelbaker Road. This road can be accessed from both Interstate 15 (at Baker) and Interstate 40 (east of Barstow). The dunes themselves lie just southwest of the Kelso ghost town and the Park's Visitor Center located in the historic Kelso Depot.

== Endemic Species ==
Like many southern California dune systems, the Kelso dunes have a number of endemic animal species. The list includes at least ten species of insects, such as the Kelso giant sand treader cricket (Macrobaenetes kelsoensis), the Kelso Jerusalem cricket (Ammopelmatus kelsoensis), Rhaphiomidas tarsalis (a rare Mydas fly), and the Kelso shieldback katydid (Eremopedes kelsoensis).

Although not strictly endemic, several plant and reptile species are rare outside of these dunes. One example is the Mojave fringe-toed lizard (Uma scoparia), which is specialized in its ability to "swim" under sand.

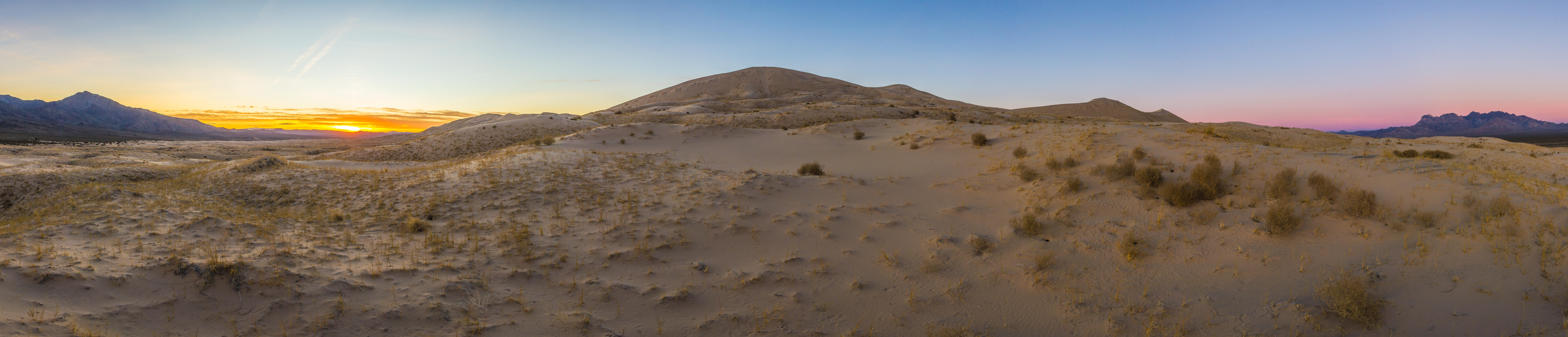
Sunset over Kelso Dunes in California.

== See also ==
- Kelso, California
- Kelso Wash
- Amboy Crater
