= Marble Mountains (San Bernardino County) =

Mountain range in California, USA

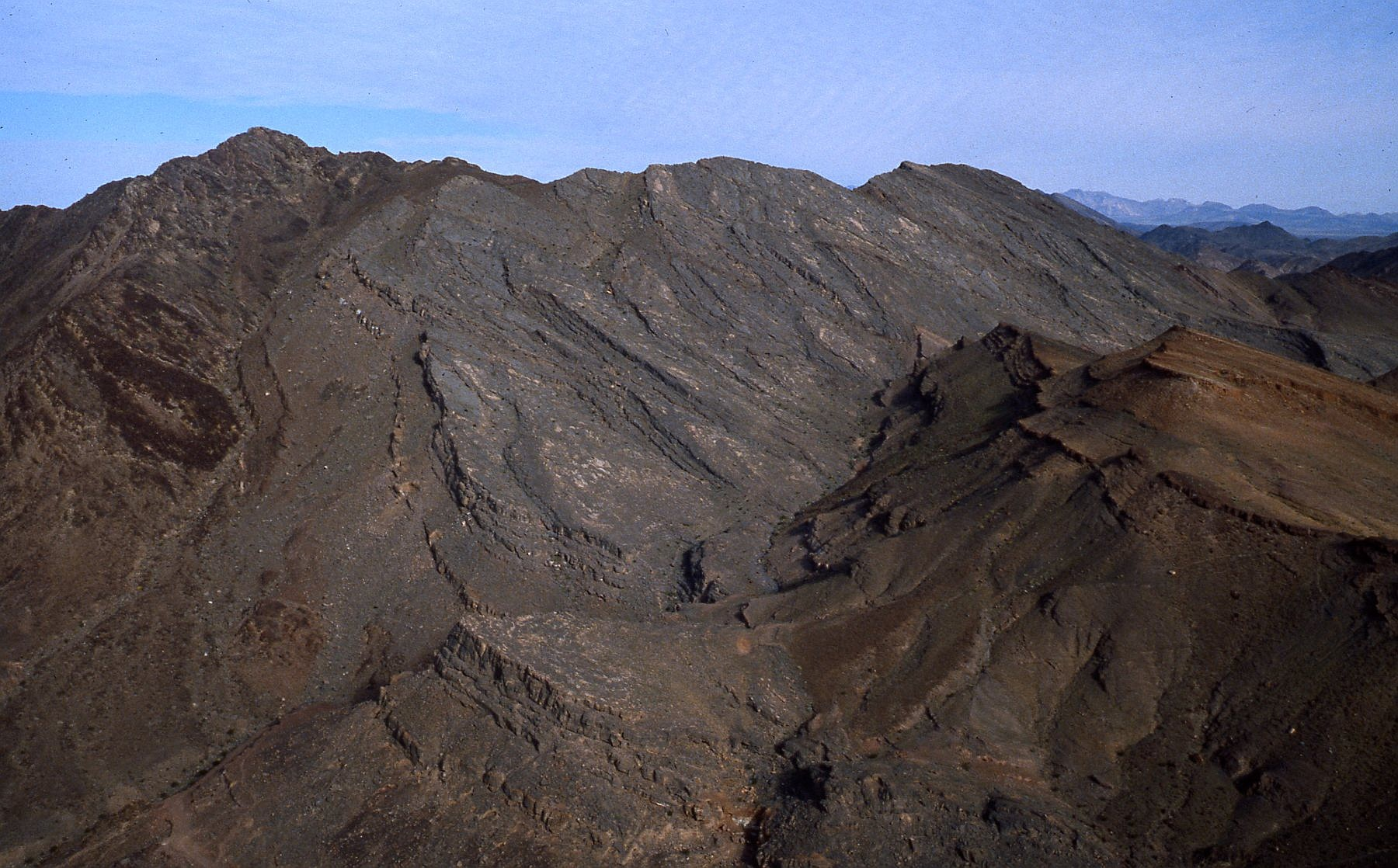

Highest point
- Elevation: 685 m (2,247 ft)

Geography
- Location within California
- Country: United States
- State: California
- District: San Bernardino County
- Range coordinates: 34°36′56.983″N 115°33′44.967″W
- Topo map: USGS Cadiz

The Marble Mountains are a mountain range in the Eastern Mojave Desert and within Mojave Trails National Monument, in San Bernardino County, California.

== Geography ==
The Marble Mountains are located just north of Cadiz, California, and are south of Bristol Dry Lake and Amboy, California. The Old Woman Mountains are to the east, and Bullion Mountains to the west. The Sheep Hole Mountains and Twentynine Palms, California are to the southeast.

== Geology ==
In the early Cambrian fossiliferous sediments from a shallow sea were deposited upon a basement of Proterozoic granite and then more uplifted to form the Marble Mountains. These sediments - the Latham Shale Formation - are between 50 ft (15 m) and 75 ft (23 m) thick. Deeper sediments metamorphized into quartzite and form a thin layer ~10 ft (3.0 m) thick between the shale and basement granite.

The Marble Mountains Fossil Beds are the site of 550-million-year-old fossils of trilobites, which were among the first animals on earth with eyes and skeletons. In all, roughly 21 species of Cambrian invertebrates have been discovered in the area. Trilobites from the order Olenellina are predominant, but 12 species of trilobite have been discovered in this area. Full specimens are rare; trilobite heads are the most commonly found feature. This may indicate the area was home to a trilobite molting ground, or simply an area where ocean currents brought dead trilobite exoskeletons. Trilobite fossils are so plentiful that in places nearly every rock contains trilobite fossils, making the region a destination for trilobite collectors worldwide. The beds have worldwide importance as they contain some of the best preserved fossils of the earliest trilobites.

== Wilderness ==
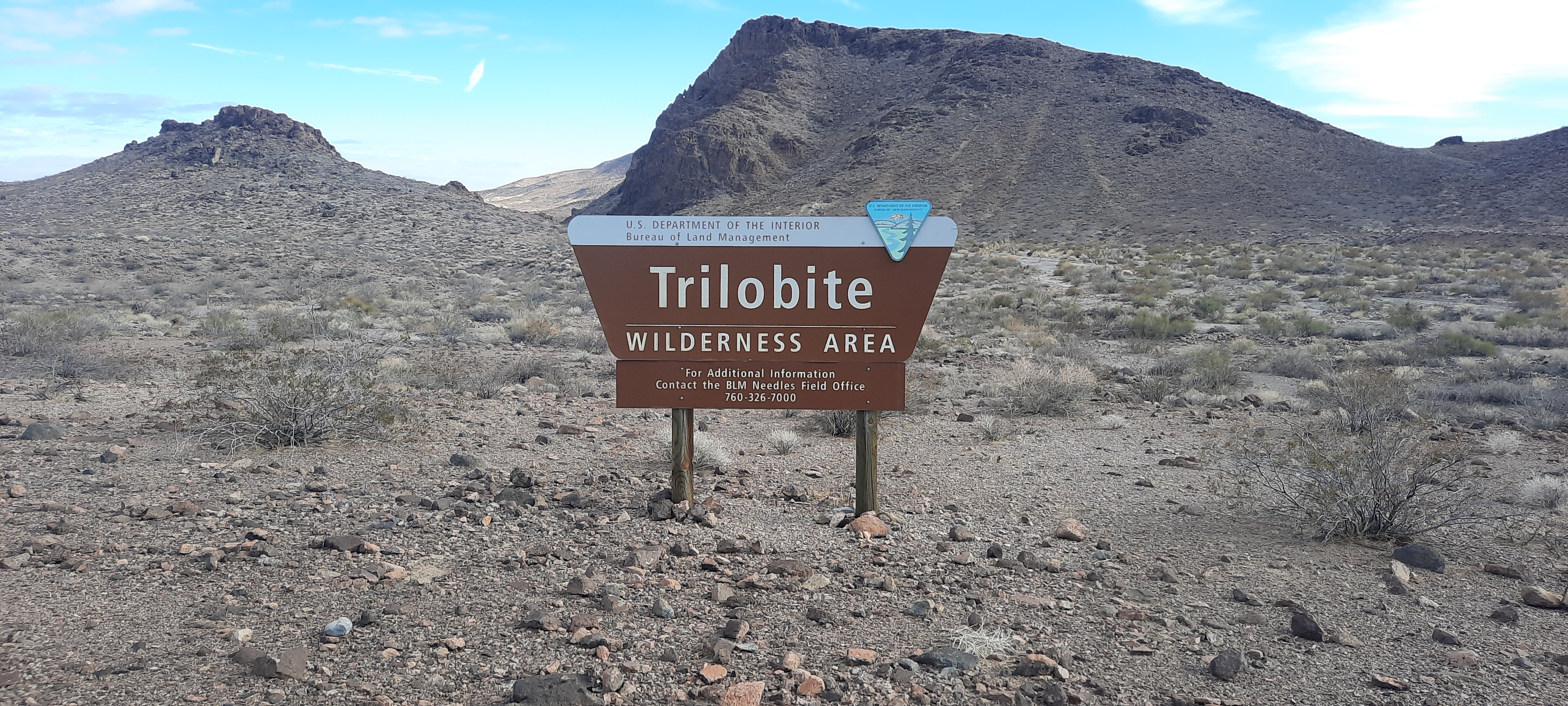
An sign at the edge of Trilobite Wilderness Area.

Established in 1994 by the U.S. Congress, the Trilobite Wilderness encompasses a large portion of the Marble Mountain range.

== See also ==
- Mojave Trails National Monument topics
- Mountain ranges of the Mojave Desert
