= Amboy, California =

Unincorporated community in California, United States

- Unincorporated community
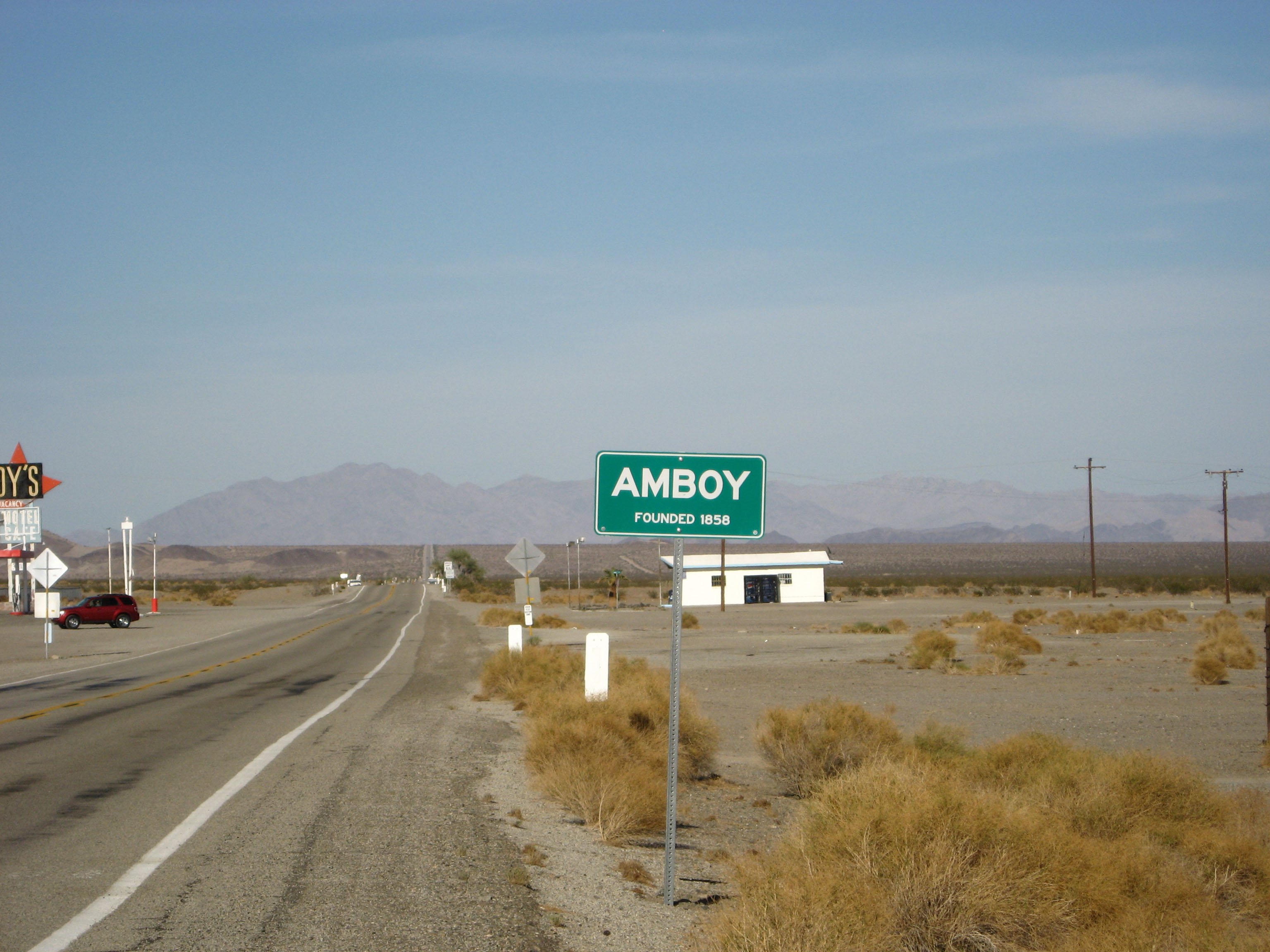
- Amboy sign, west side of town

- Location within the state of California
- Coordinates: 34°33′25″N 115°44′42″W
- Country: United States
- State: California
- County: San Bernardino
- Founded: 1883

Population (2010)
  - Total: 1
- Time zone: UTC-8 (Pacific (PST))
  - Summer (DST): UTC-7 (PDT)
- ZIP codes: 92304
- Area codes: 442/760
- GNIS feature ID: 238579

Amboy is an unincorporated community in San Bernardino County, in California's Mojave Desert, west of Needles and east of Ludlow on historic Route 66. It is roughly 60 miles (97 km) northeast of Twentynine Palms. As of 2020, the town's business district still contained a post office, a historic restaurant-motel, and a Route 66 tourist shop, all operated by the town's population of four people. As of 2024, only the gas station was open, and the population was zero.

== History ==
Although Amboy was first settled in 1858, the town was not established until 1883. Lewis Kingman, a locating engineer for the Atlantic and Pacific Railroad, created the town as the first of a series of alphabetical railroad stations that were to be constructed across the Mojave Desert. The name was probably taken from a location in the eastern United States.

In 1926, Amboy became a boom town after the commissioning of U.S. Route 66.

In 1938, Roy's Motel and Café opened and prospered due to its isolated location on the route. By 1940, Amboy's population had increased to 65. Its growth was tied not only to tourists, but also to the Santa Fe Railroad over which freight trains still run today between Kingman, Arizona and the BNSF Railway Barstow, California yard.

During the Great Depression and World War II, from 1929 through 1945, tourism declined nationally. But the remaining travelers' need for lodging, meals, and gasoline kept the town busy. The town remained this way until the opening of Interstate 40 in 1973, which bypassed Amboy.

In 2024, a news report stated that the population was zero, even though one business remained open.

== Geography ==
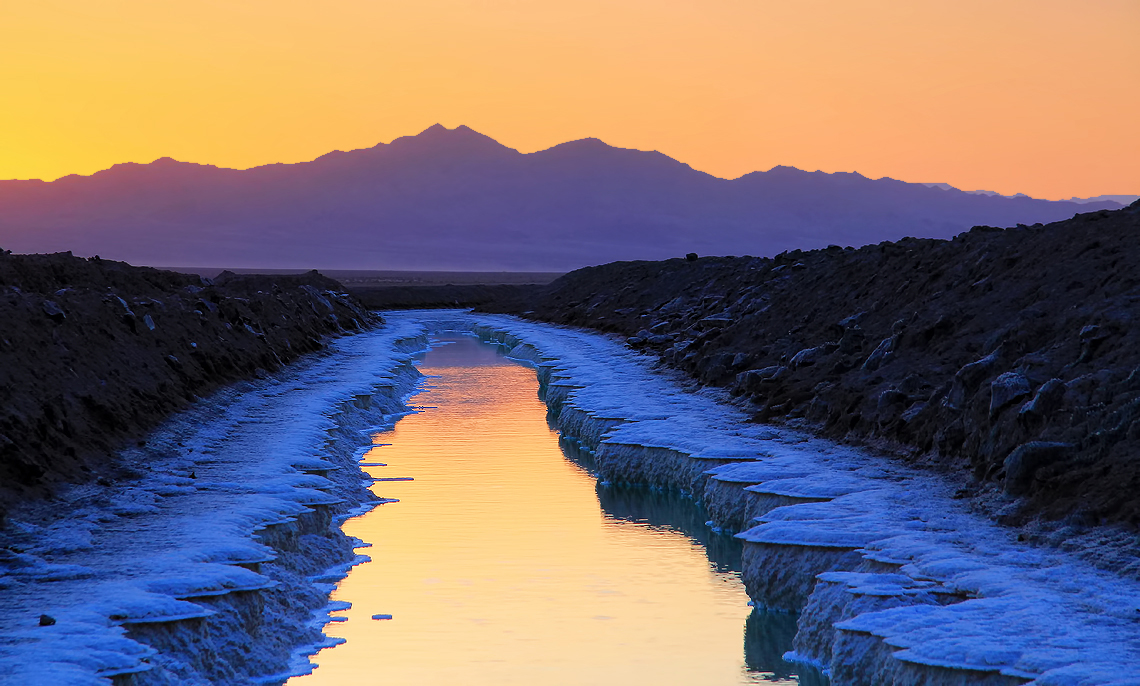
Salt Ponds of Amboy

The town is south of the Granite Mountains, Providence Mountains, and the Mojave National Preserve. Adjacent to the south is the landmark Amboy Crater, and beyond to the southeast the Bullion Mountains. To the south is Bristol Lake and the community of Cadiz, California.

Amboy was once a major stop along the famous Route 66, but has seen much lower visitation since the opening of Interstate 40 to the north in 1973. Amboy is home to Roy's Motel and Café, a Route 66 landmark.

In 2007, the town reportedly had a total of 10 surviving buildings and a population of far fewer than the advertised 20, which, according to the Los Angeles Times, was approximately four. A resident interviewed in a short 2014 documentary also gave the population as four, all of whom are men. By 2024, however, the permanent resident population had declined to zero; only a single open business has kept Amboy from being declared a ghost town.

== Arts and culture ==
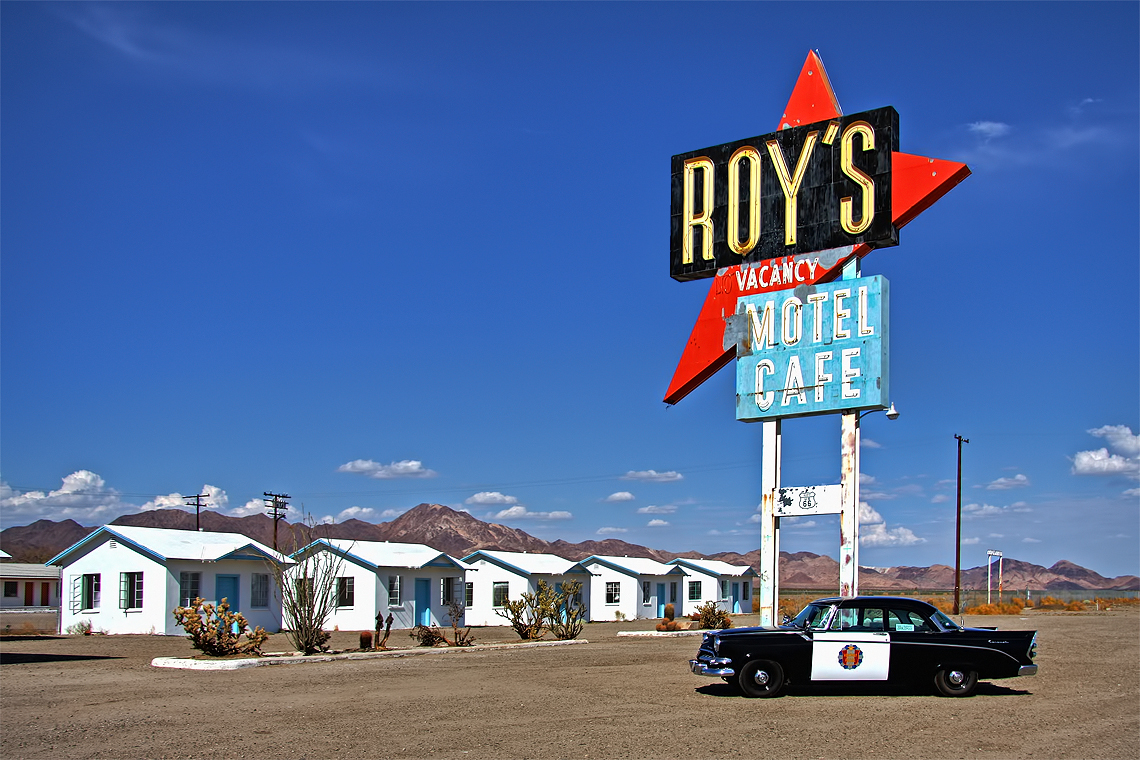
Roy's Café & Motel

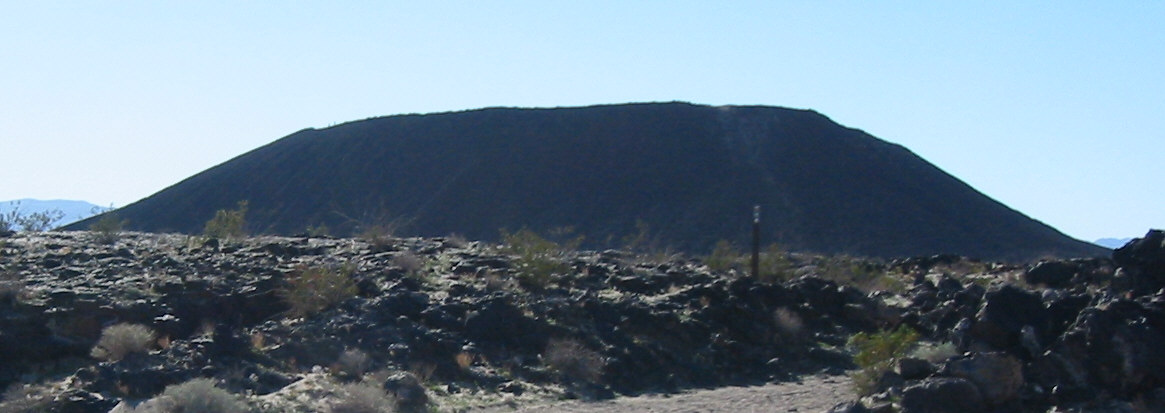
Amboy Crater, as viewed from the east.

=== Roy's Motel and Café ===
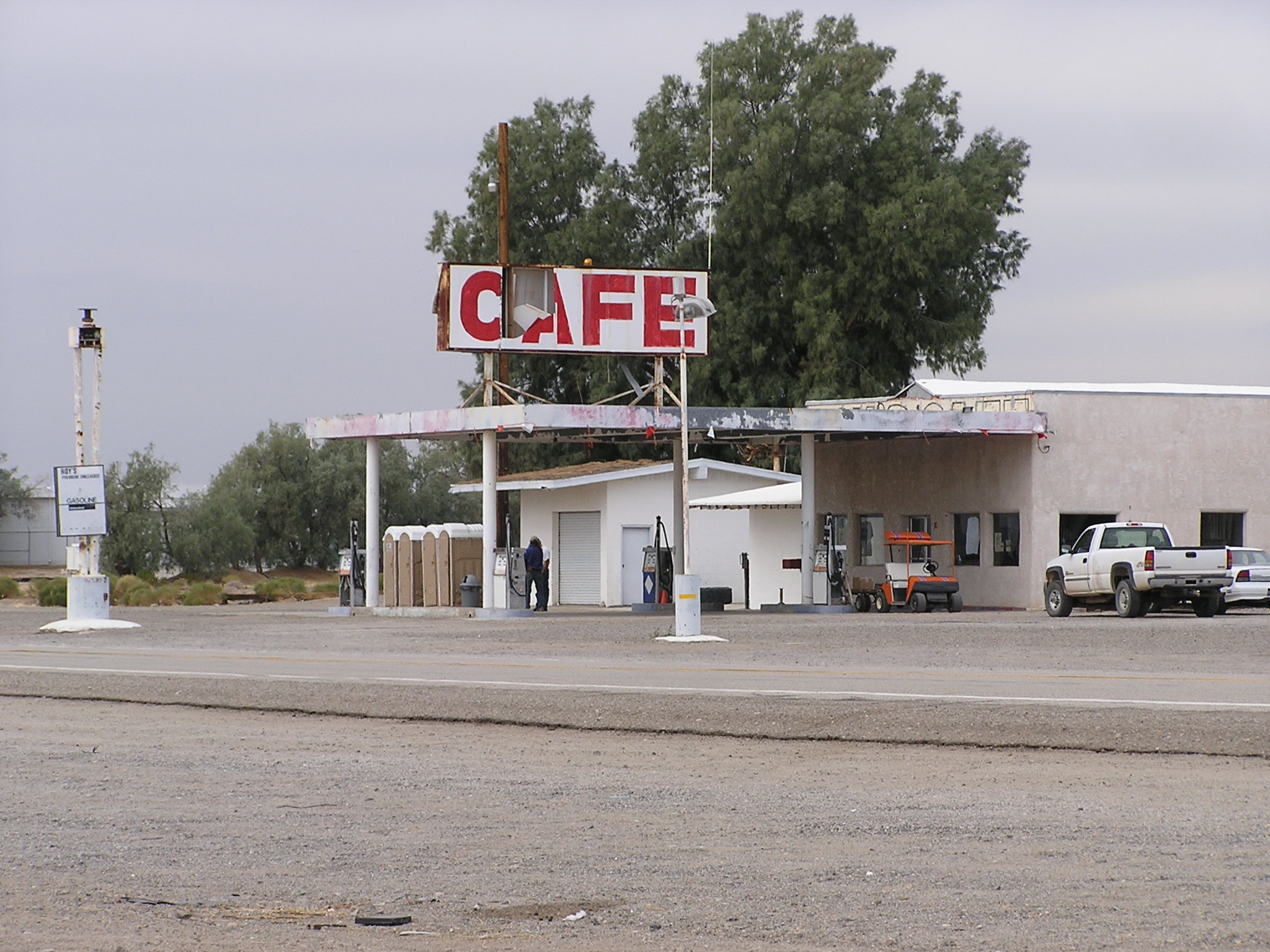
Roy's gas station prior to its restoration.

Roy's Motel and Café provided gasoline, food, and lodging. It was noted for its "retro-future" Googie architecture added to one of the original buildings, and its sign, a 1959 addition. Both Roy's and the surrounding town were once owned by Buster Burris, one of Route 66's most famous characters who purchased Roy's from his father-in-law Roy Crowl, the man for whom the property is named, in 1938 and ran the town until 1995. More recently, efforts to preserve Amboy and reopen Roy's have been undertaken by businessman Albert Okura and his son Kyle Okura.

=== Amboy School ===
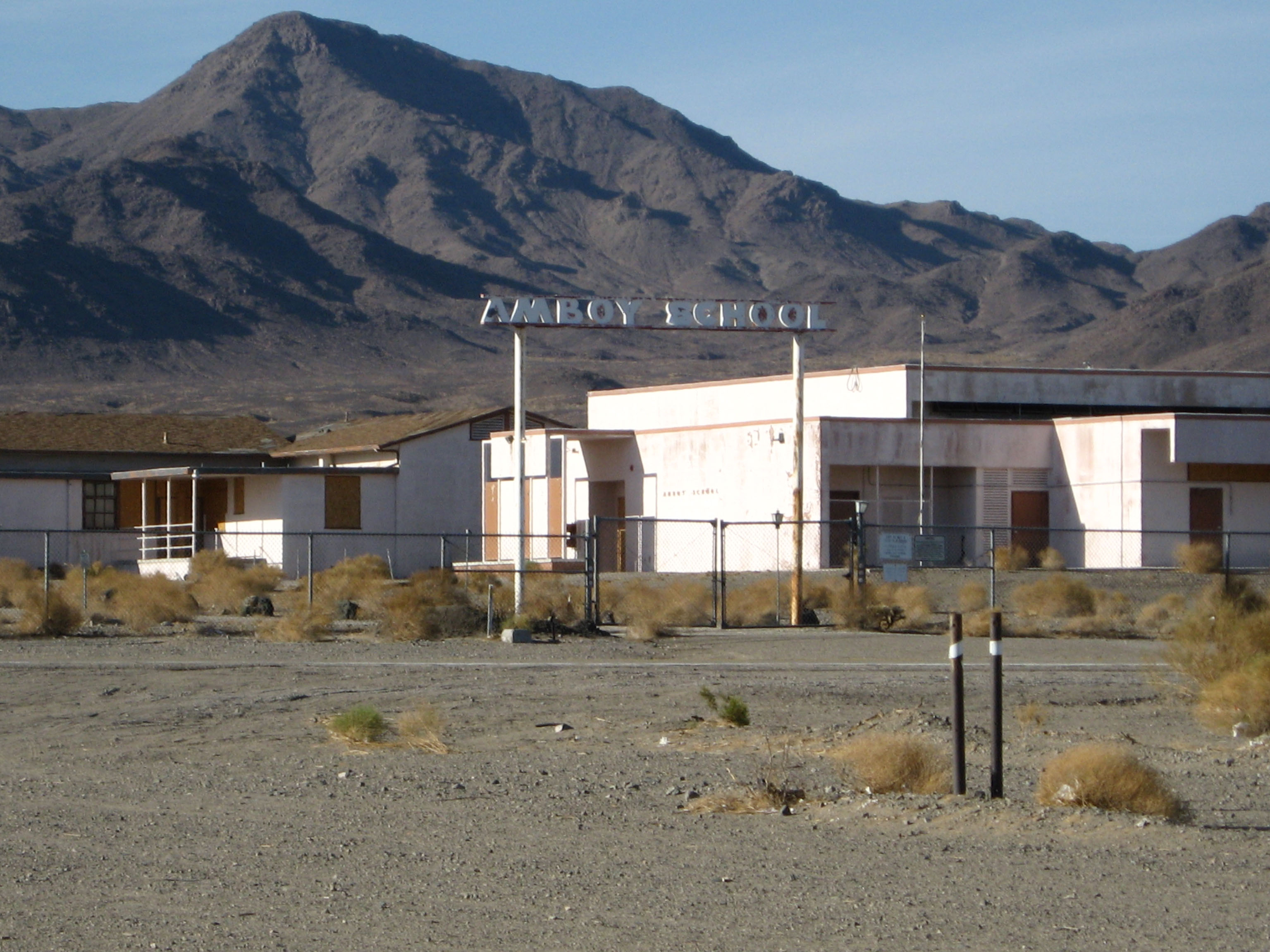
Amboy school.

The former Amboy School is adjacent to Roy's; the school closed in 1999.

== Media ==
Part of the 1986 film The Hitcher with Rutger Hauer was filmed in Amboy. Roy's was the setting for a 1999 television commercial for Qwest Communications. It was also used in Enrique Iglesias' music video "Hero" and the film Live Evil. The town's former owners Walt Wilson and Timothy White maintained Amboy in weathered, unrestored condition for use as a motion picture film site.

In 1993, Huell Howser visited Amboy during episode 410 of California's Gold as part of his ongoing series visiting interesting areas of California. During the episode, he interviewed Buster Burris, the owner of Roy's. The episode was aired on December 3, 1993, and also showed Wonder Valley in the Morongo Basin and the Amboy Crater.

== In popular culture ==
A fictional version of Amboy, complete with Roy's Hotel and sign, was part of Ivan's rig and roll map for 18 Wheels of Steel Haulin'.

A racing game Blur (2010) features Amboy at some of its tracks.

The heist film "They Came To Rob Las Vegas" (1968) occurs near Amboy, in the desert, which was actually filmed in Spain.

== See also ==
- Amboy Airfield
- Bristol Lake
- List of ghost towns in California
