= Kelso, California =

Kelso
- Ghost town
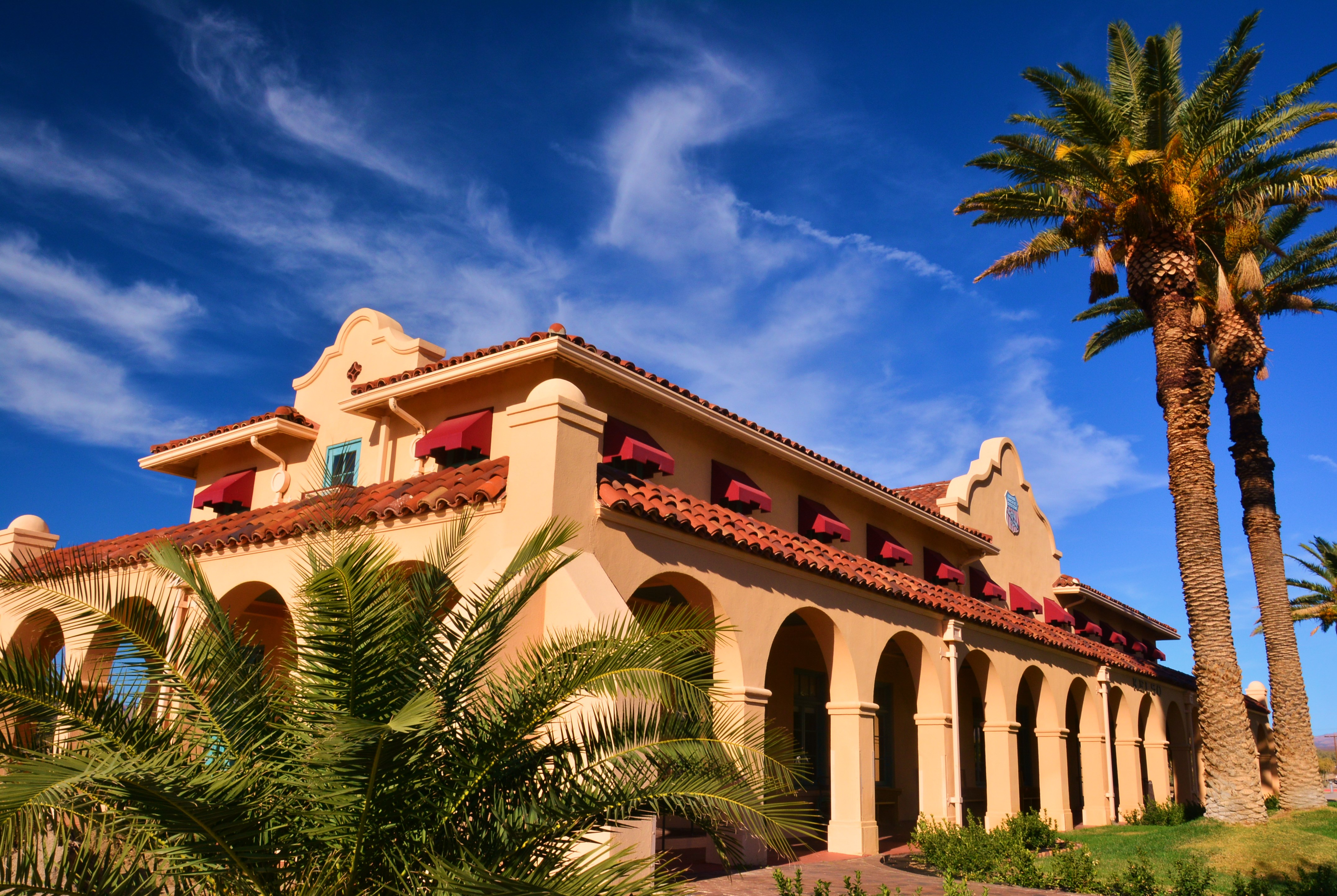
- Historic Kelso Depot

- Location in the state of California Kelso (the United States)
- Coordinates: 35°0′45″N 115°39′13″W
- Country: United States
- State: California
- County: San Bernardino
- Elevation: 2,126 ft (648 m)
- Time zone: UTC-8 (Pacific (PST))
  - Summer (DST): UTC-7 (PDT)
- ZIP Codes: 92309
- Area codes: 442/760
- FIPS code: 06-38058
- GNIS feature ID: 244232

Kelso is a ghost town and defunct railroad depot in the Mojave National Preserve in San Bernardino County, California, USA. It was named after railroad worker John H. Kelso, whose name was placed into a hat along with two other workers to decide the name of the town. The town was built in 1905 specifically as a railroad station along the rail line between Utah and Los Angeles, originally called "Siding 16," because of its location and nearby springs that provided abundant water. Historic Spots in California states, "At Kelso stands a beautiful Spanish-style Union Pacific Depot built about 1906, surrounded by shade trees, a welcome rarity in the hot, barren desert."

== History ==
Starting off as what was a simple train depot in the 1920s, the town of Kelso boomed briefly to as many as 2,000 residents in the 1940s, when borax and iron mines opened nearby. Gold and silver were also discovered in the nearby hills of what became known as the Kelso district. The town shrank again when the mines closed after about a decade.

Kelso was a base of operations for the San Pedro, Los Angeles and Salt Lake Railroad, connecting track of Union Pacific Railroad, to which the SPLA&SL had negotiated trackage rights, with the Atchison, Topeka and Santa Fe Railway east-west line to the south. Here, trains were watered and "helper" locomotives were attached to assist the regular trains in climbing the steep Cima Hill. The distance between Las Vegas and the connection with the Santa Fe line at Daggett was too far for trains without a meal car, so Kelso was a convenient spot for a restaurant stop.

The depot building itself was built in 1923 using a Spanish "California mission" building style. It contained boarding rooms for railroad employees and a restaurant for both employees and passengers. It also had a telegraph office and waiting room. Later, a restaurant nicknamed the "Beanery" that served home-style meals was housed in the building. The large rooms in the basement also served as a community center for local residents.

About 1944 the railroad brought in an old strap-iron jail to detain local drunks. It is now on display just outside the Kelso Depot.

The depot remained in operation until 1986. Left to the harsh conditions in the desert, the building began to deteriorate. By the mid-1990s the railroad was on the verge of demolishing the depot. Preservationists then stepped in to save it. In 2005, it was renovated to become the Mojave National Preserve's visitor center. The facility is currently closed for repairs.

During the 1970s Kelso was known as "the town without television." About 75 residents lived in Kelso, many with school age children. Television signals could not reach the town which meant that residents found other methods of recreation. However, with the advent of satellite dishes, television was eventually introduced to Kelso.

The ZIP Code is 92309 and the community is inside area codes 442 and 760.

The Kelso Mountains are located north of Kelso, the Kelso Dunes lie to the southwest, and the entire area lies within the boundary of the Mojave National Preserve.

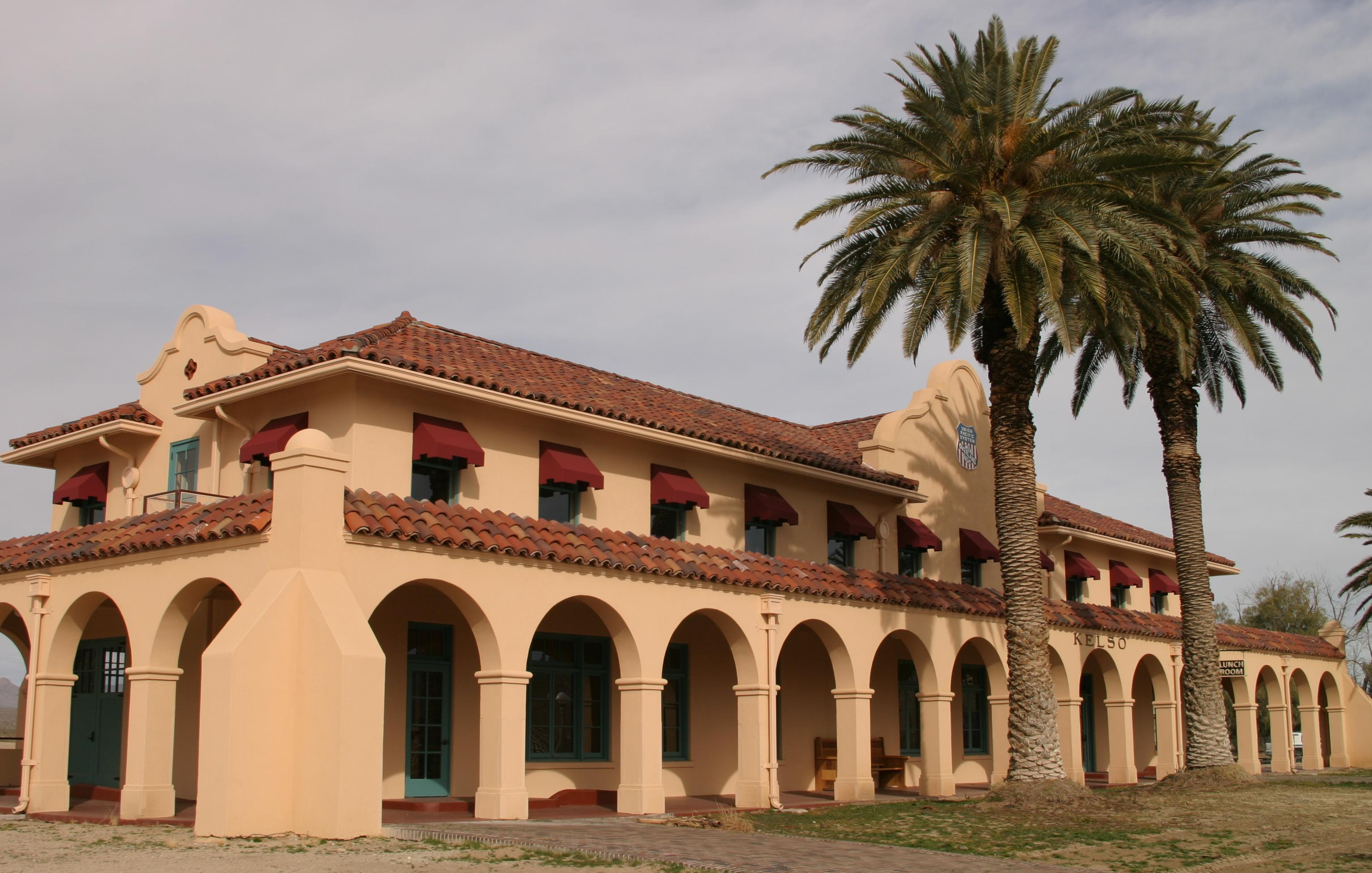
Kelso railroad depot after repainting.

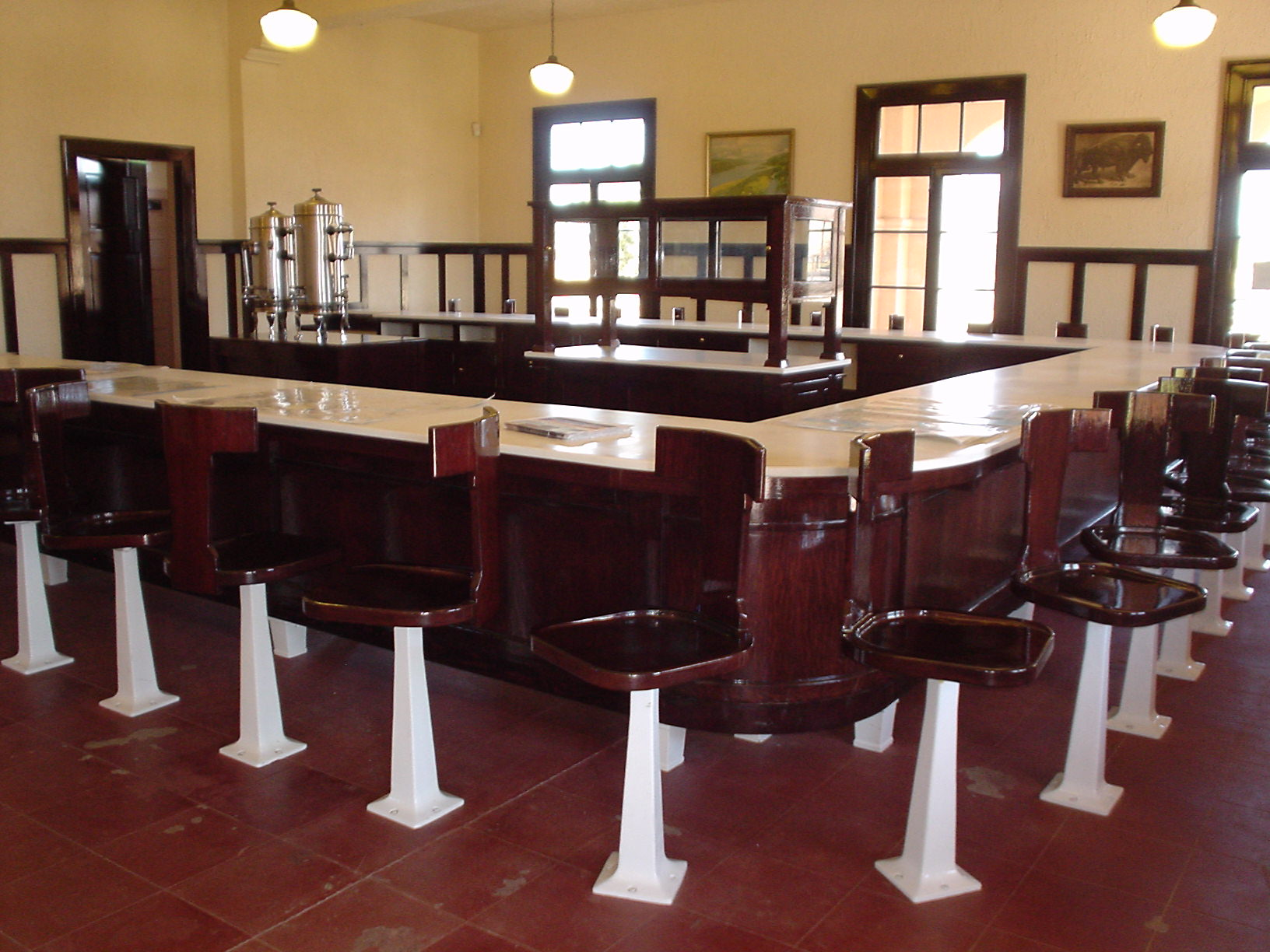
Restored restaurant at depot.

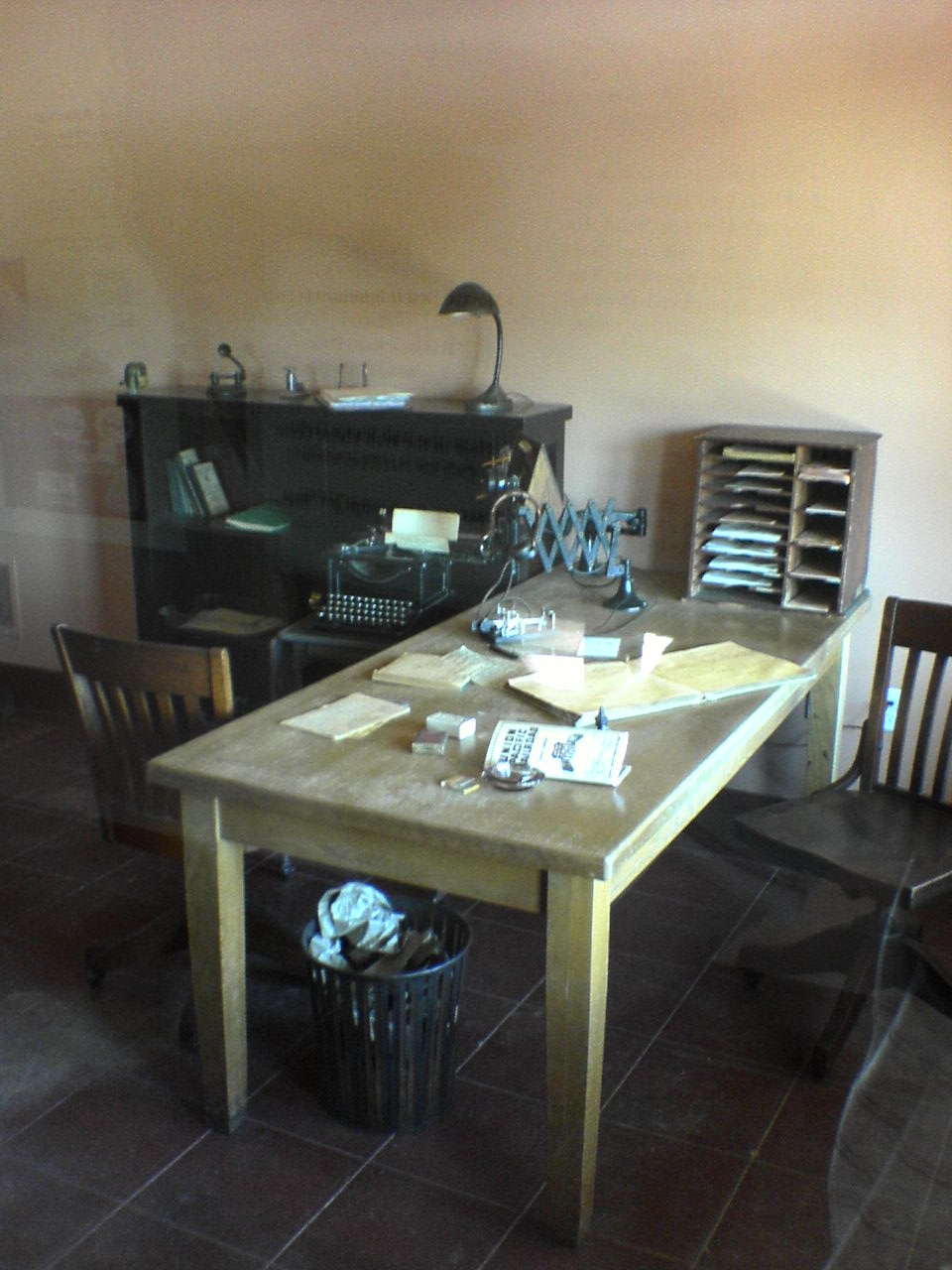
Restored telegraph office at depot.

== See also ==
- Kelso Depot, Restaurant and Employees Hotel
- Kelso Wash
- List of ghost towns in California
