= Cadiz, California =

Unincorporated community in California, United States

- Unincorporated community
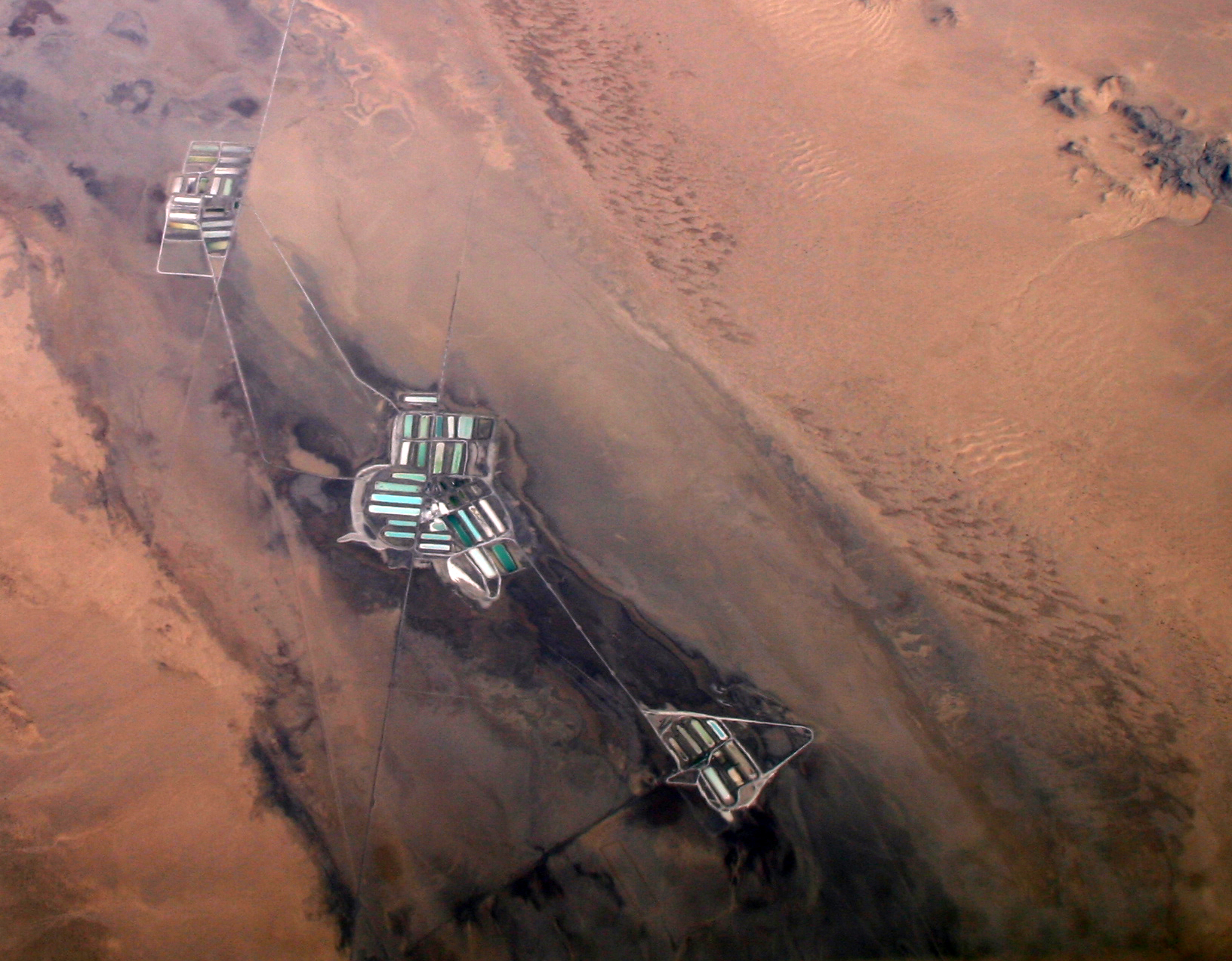
- Salt evaporation ponds near Cadiz

- Location within the state of California Cadiz, California (the United States)
- Coordinates: 34°31′12″N 115°30′46″W
- Country: United States
- State: California
- County: San Bernardino
- Founded: 1883
- Elevation: 791 ft (241 m)
- Time zone: UTC-8 (Pacific (PST))
  - Summer (DST): UTC-7 (PDT)
- ZIP codes: 92304
- Area codes: 442/760
- FIPS code: 06-09472
- GNIS feature ID: 239977

Cadiz (Spanish: Cádiz) is an unincorporated community in the Mojave Desert in San Bernardino County, California, United States. It is located just south of the Marble Mountains near the National Trails Highway. Cadiz was a water stop on the railroad.

== History ==
The town was named in 1883 by Lewis Kingman, a locating engineer for the Atlantic and Pacific Railroad. It is the third in a string of alphabetically named railroad stations in the Mojave Desert.

== Climate ==
This area has a large amount of sunshine year round due to its stable descending air and high pressure.

== Economy ==
The Cadiz Valley area overlies a large aquifer. Cadiz, Inc., a Los Angeles–based land and water-resource-management company, owns more than 35,000 acres (140 km^{2}) around Cadiz. It has plans to sell water from the aquifer. Under the first Trump administration's change of policy, the project would not have to undergo federal review. In 2022, officials at Biden's Interior Department petitioned a federal judge to throw out project approvals issued in 2020.

== Transportation ==
=== Railroads ===
Cadiz is on the BNSF Railway's Southern Transcon line that runs from Los Angeles to Chicago. It was previously the Atchison, Topeka and Santa Fe Railway line. From Cadiz, the Arizona & California Railroad runs over a former ATSF line to Phoenix via Parker, Arizona.

In September 2013, Cadiz, Inc. negotiated the Arizona & California Railroad for trackage rights for a tourist train operation between Cadiz and Parker. The train was projected to be powered by a steam locomotive, listing Santa Fe 3751 as the potential engine. The plans also required a new station and museum in Cadiz.

=== Cadiz Airstrip ===
Cadiz Airstrip (CA90) is situated south of the railroad tracks and has one paved runway 8/26 with a length of 5,280 feet (1,610 m). The airstrip is accessible via a dirt road and has no buildings.

== See also ==
- Bristol Dry Lake
