= Kelso Mountains =

Mountain range in California, United States

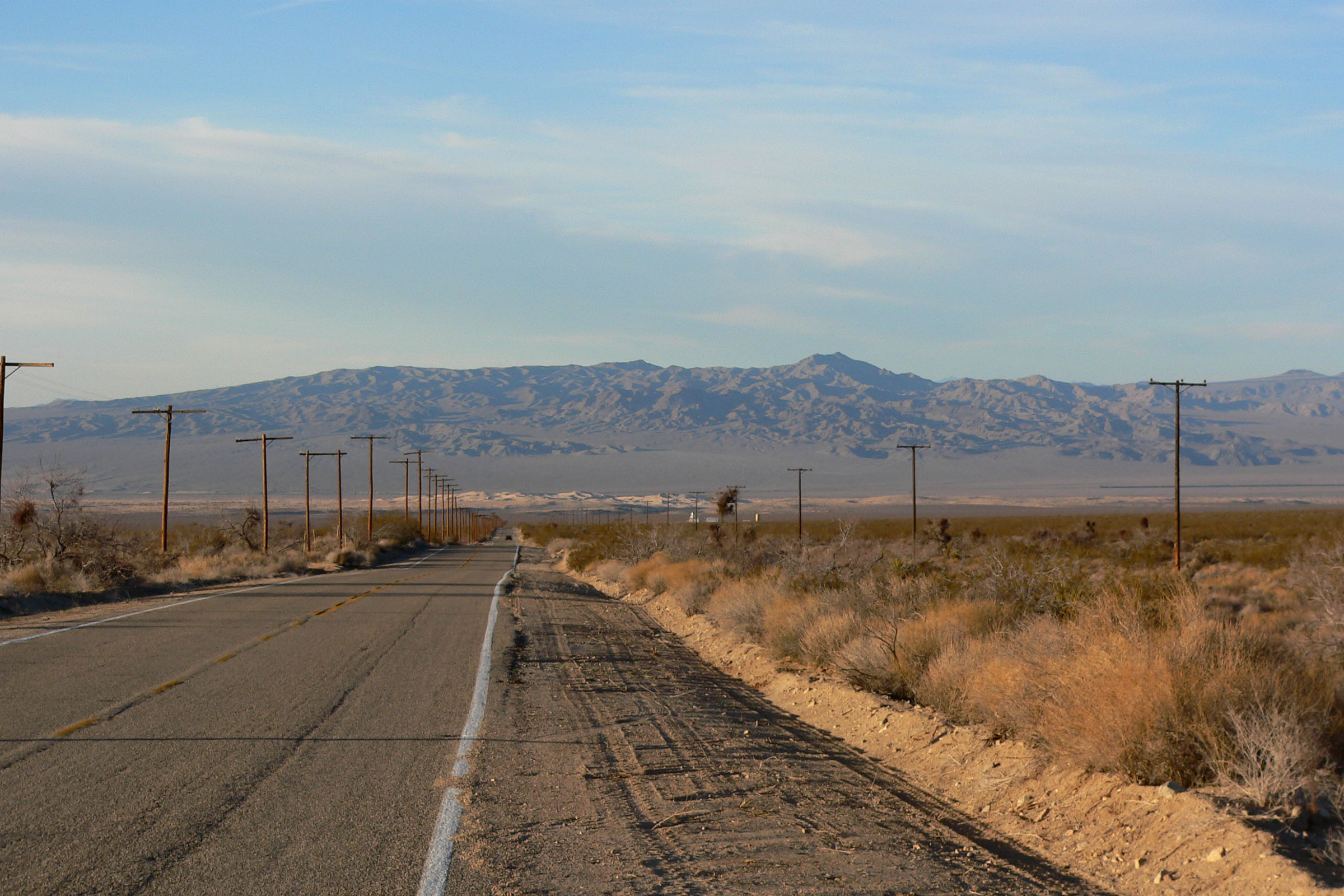
- Kelso Mountains seen from Kelbaker Road south of Kelso

Highest point
- Elevation: 1,226 m (4,022 ft)

Geography
- Location within California
- Country: United States
- State: California
- District: San Bernardino County
- Range coordinates: 35°5′20.951″N 115°44′22.998″W
- Topo map: USGS Kelso

The Kelso Mountains are located just north of the small community of Kelso and the Kelso Dunes, in the Mojave National Preserve in southeastern California. The town of Baker, near Interstate 15, lies approximately 18 miles (29 km) to the northwest of the mountain range. Kelso Peak, at 4,764 feet (1,452 m), is the principal peak of the range. Like most of the Mojave Desert, the range is characterized by little rainfall, and usually receives less than 5–6 inches (125–150 mm) of precipitation in a normal year.
