= Ludlow, California =

Unincorporated community in California, United States

Ludlow
- Unincorporated community
- Location within the state of California Ludlow (the United States)
- Coordinates: 34°43′16″N 116°09′36″W
- Country: United States
- State: California
- County: San Bernardino
- Founded: 1882
- Elevation: 1,778 ft (542 m)

Population (2000)
  - Total: 10
- Time zone: UTC-8 (Pacific (PST))
  - Summer (DST): UTC-7 (PDT)
- ZIP codes: 92338
- Area code: 760
- GNIS feature ID: 245290

Ludlow is an unincorporated community in the Mojave Desert on Interstate 40, located in San Bernardino County, California, United States. The older remains of the ghost town are along historic Route 66.

== History ==
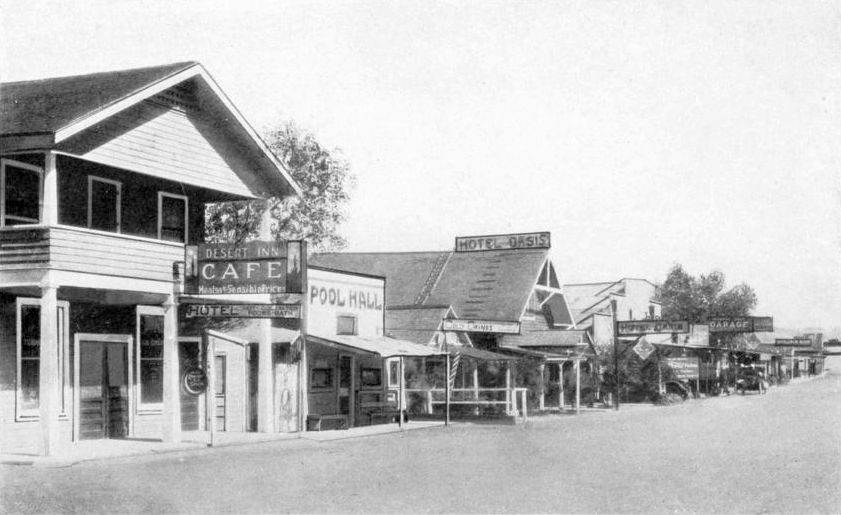
Main Street, 1927

=== Origins ===
The community settlement dates back to 1870s. The community of Ludlow was named after William Ludlow of the Southern Pacific Railroad.

In 1882, the town was founded. The town started as a water stop for the Atlantic and Pacific Railroad. Ore was found in the nearby hills, leading to the town's boom.

From 1906 to 1940 it was the southern railhead for the Tonopah and Tidewater Railroad, operated by the Pacific Coast Borax Company and bringing borax and other mining products from Death Valley and Beatty, Nevada, to long distance Santa Fe Railway lines. It also served as the northern railhead for the Ludlow and Southern Railway, a mining line that ran south to the Bagdad-Chase gold mine and the mining camp of Rochester. It operated from 1903 to 1931.

=== U.S. Route 66 ===
By the 1940s, local mining and railway activity had ceased and the town survived supplying the needs of travellers on the National Old Trails Road, renamed to become the legendary Route 66 in California. With Ludlow providing a Motor Court with bungalow cabins, the streamline moderne Ludlow Cafe, a gasoline-service garage, and shade. They operated through the late 1960s. After Interstate 40 was built bypassing the town, there was little business and most residents departed, leaving ruins of empty buildings and Tamarisk trees that still stand flanking the old highway. Tourists following and exploring historic Route 66 pass through the ghost town now.

=== Chinese history ===
A Chinese family resided in Ludlow. Lee Yim, his wife Guishee Yim, and their five children lived in Ludlow. The family operated The Desert Inn Cafe and Hotel. The family lived in the community from 1914 to 1960s.

In 1917, there was the Lee Yim Deposit near Ludlow that began mining production in 1918. It was associated to Lavic Mining District. The mine is closed and it is part of Kelso Dunes Wilderness.

== Geography ==
To the northwest on Interstate 40 are Newberry Springs and Barstow, California. To the east on Route 66 is Amboy, Amboy Crater, and Essex, and on Interstate 40 is Needles, California, and the Colorado River.

The Mojave National Preserve and Kelso Dunes, of the National Park Service, is to the northeast of town. To the west is Pisgah Crater in the Lavic Lake volcanic field. The Bullion Mountains are south behind the town, with the Bristol Mountains to the east and Cady Mountains to the northwest.

=== Climate ===
This area has a large amount of sunshine year round due to its stable descending air and high pressure. According to the Köppen Climate Classification system, Ludlow has a desert climate, abbreviated "Bwh" on climate maps.

== Arts and culture ==
This is a list of landmarks including its former structures.

- The Desert Inn Cafe and Hotel - This was located on Main St. facing the railroad tracks. The restaurant and hotel was owned by Lee Yim and his family.
- Ludlow Cafe - It is plain box-like building that was a cafe in the 1940s. It was built of lumber salvaged from the Tonopah & Tidewater Railroad. In the 1960s, Earl and Lillian Warnix sold it to Laurel and Cameron Friend. The building withstood two fires. By 2015, the building had been reduced to rubble.
- Ludlow Cemetery - a pioneer cemetery.
- Ludlow Airfield - Small airfield in Ludlow 5CA4

== Media ==
In 2015, Ludlow was one of the filming locations for the film Sky as well as Barstow, Bombay Beach, Hinkley, Joshua Tree, Landers, Lenwood, Newberry Springs, and Victorville, California.

== See also ==
- California Route 66 Museum
- Category: Mojave National Preserve
- Kelso Depot – (Mojave National Preserve Visitors Center)
- Western America Railroad Museum
