= Bristol Mountains =

Mountain range in California

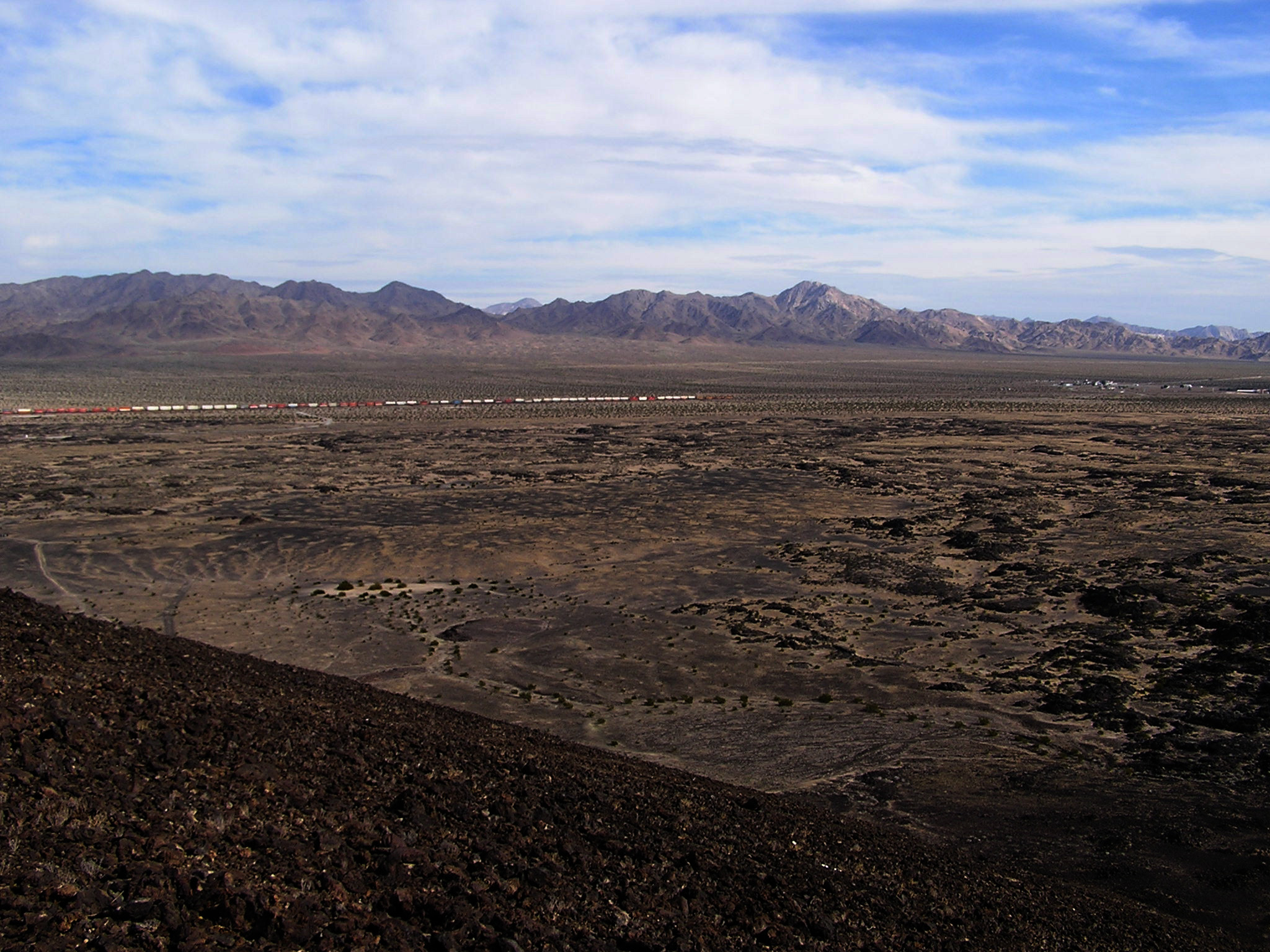
- Southeast end of Bristol Mountains as seen from Amboy Crater. The town of Amboy can be seen on the right side of the image

Highest point
- Elevation: 1,030 m (3,380 ft)

Geography
- Location within southern California Location within California Location within the United States
- Country: United States
- State: California
- Region: Mojave Desert
- District: San Bernardino County
- Range coordinates: 34°50′56.954″N 116°3′18.033″W
- Topo map: USGS East of Broadwell Lake

The Bristol Mountains are found in the Mojave Desert of California, USA, just west of Mojave National Preserve. The range, which reaches an elevation of 3,874 feet (1,181 m), is located in San Bernardino County, and crosses Interstate 40 between Ludlow and the Granite Mountains. At the southern end of the range lies the town of Amboy, the Amboy Crater, and Bristol Dry Lake.

== Bristol Mountains Wilderness Area ==
Most of the Bristol Mountains is in a Federally designated Wilderness and lies within either the Bristol Mountains Wilderness Area or the Kelso Dunes Wilderness Area.

The remainder of the range is designated for Wilderness status in the proposed California Desert Protection Act of 2010.

Project Carryall, proposed in 1963 by the Atomic Energy Commission, the California Division of Highways (now called Caltrans), and the Santa Fe Railway, would have used 22 nuclear explosions to excavate a massive roadcut through the Bristol Mountains, to accommodate construction of Interstate 40 and a new rail line. The project was part of Operation Plowshare.

== See also ==
- Cady Mountains
- Category: Mountain ranges of the Mojave Desert
- Category: Protected areas of the Mojave Desert
