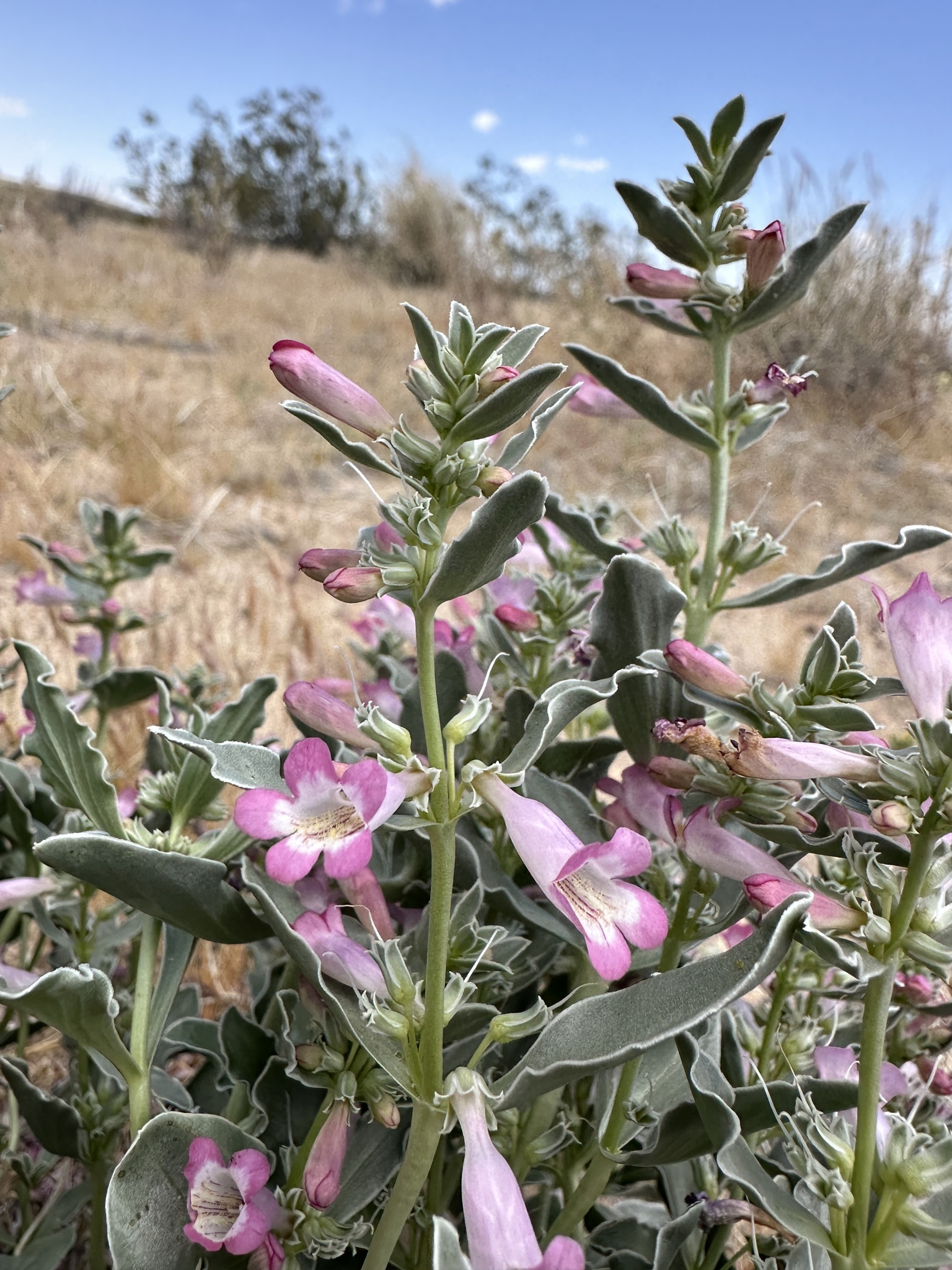
- Mojave Trails National Monument, San Bernardino County, California

Conservation status
- Critically Imperiled (NatureServe)

Scientific classification
- Kingdom: Plantae
- Clade: Tracheophytes
- Clade: Angiosperms
- Clade: Eudicots
- Clade: Asterids
- Order: Lamiales
- Family: Plantaginaceae
- Genus: Penstemon
- Species: P. albomarginatus

Binomial name
- Penstemon albomarginatus M.E.Jones

= Penstemon albomarginatus =

Plant species in the plantain family

Penstemon albomarginatus is a rare species of penstemon known by the common name white-margined penstemon. It is native to the deserts of southern Nevada, western Arizona, and southern California.

== Description ==
Penstemon albomarginatus is a perennial plant that grows from a relatively deep taproot that may measure 30–120 centimeters (1–4 ft) long. The herbaceous stems are 10–35 centimeters (4–14 in) tall and usually have lower ends that resemble rhizomes and are buried in the sandy soil. They are hairless and somewhat waxy in texture.

The leaves are cauline, attached to the stems, rather than being attached to the base of the plant. The leaves are attached by short petioles, leaf stems, or directly by the leaf base. Their surface is a glossy green and have edges without teeth, but are rough and white. Lower leaves can be reduced and resemble scales, while upper leaves may range from 18–60 millimeters (0.7–2.4 in) in length and 5–22 mm (0.2–0.9 in) in width.

The inflorescence produces several purplish-pink tubular flowers between 1–2 centimeters (0.4–0.8 in) long surrounded at the bases by toothed, white-edged sepals. The flower has some hairs in the mouth, but the staminode is hairless. The flowers are pollinated by vespid wasps and probably other insects, such as carabid beetles.

== Taxonomy ==
The geologist and botanist Marcus E. Jones scientifically described and named Penstemon albomarginatus in 1908. It has no botanical synonyms.

=== Names ===
Penstemon albomarginatus is known in English by the common names of white-margined penstemon or white-margin beardtongue. Both the common names and the specific epithet "albomarginatus" come from the white colored leaf margins.

== Range and habitat ==
The range of Penstemon albomarginatus is quite limited, only growing in four widely separated areas in three states. In California it grows in two sandy desert washes near Pisgah Crater and Lavic Lake volcanic field. In Nevada it is found in two locations, one in the valleys near Jean in Clark County and the other in the Amargosa Valley in Nye County. In Arizona it found in Dutch Flat, in Mohave County.

It only grows in sandy soils, though it may be found in both stable and windblown sands. In rocky areas between dunes it is not able to establish itself.

=== Conservation ===
The white-margined penstemon was evaluated in 2024 and listed as critically imperiled (G1) by NatureServe. It is similarly listed as critically imperiled (S1) in California and Arizona and imperiled (S2) in Nevada.

== See also ==
List of Penstemon species
