= Bristol Lake =

Lake in United States of America

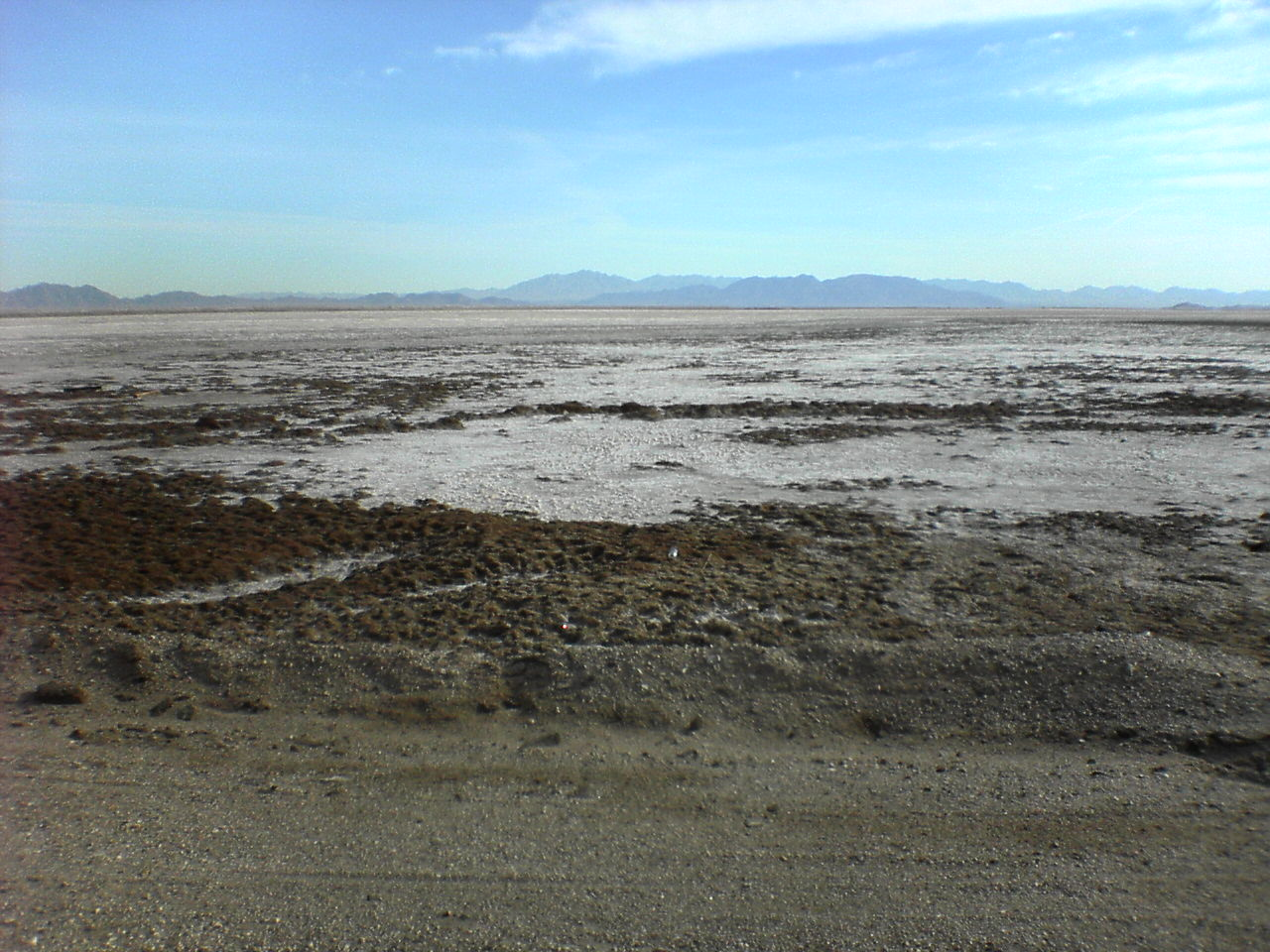

- Location within California Location within the United States
- Location: Mojave Desert; San Bernardino County, California
- Coordinates: 34.4622°N 115.6738°W
- Lake type: Endorheic basin
- Primary outflows: Terminal (evaporation)
- Basin countries: United States
- Max. length: 23 km (14 mi)
- Max. width: 20 km (12 mi)
- Shore length^{1}: 70 km (43 mi)
- Surface elevation: 183 m (600 ft)
- Settlements: Amboy, California; Saltus, California
- References: U.S. Geological Survey Geographic Names Information System: Bristol Lake
- ^{1} Shore length is not a well-defined measure.

Bristol Lake is a dry lake in the Mojave Desert of San Bernardino County, California, 42 km (26 mi) northeast of Twentynine Palms.

Bristol Lake is located southeast of Amboy and U.S. Route 66, and is also south of Cadiz. Amboy Crater and the Bullion Mountains are to the west, and Old Woman Mountains to the east.

The lake is approximately 23 km (14 mi) long and 20 km (12 mi) at its widest point.

== Geological setting ==
Bristol Lake is located in San Bernardino County's Mojave Desert. It is a playa lake in the Basin and Range Province and is the northernmost member of a northwest-southeast trending playa lake system that includes Cadiz Lake and Danby Lake.

== Mineralogy ==
Bristol Lake's mineralogy is described as having a bullseye pattern of minerals with lithofacies consisting of halite at the center surrounded by mud, gypsum, and finally a sand flat playa margin. These minerals also have vertical lithofacies which resemble the horizontal facies stratification with gypsum occurring deeper in the playa followed by mud-halite and halite on top.

The mud lithofacies consists of thick detrital mud, and the halite lithofacies is defined by giant hopper shaped crystals. Gypsum occurs in large lenticular crystals throughout the playa but is mostly concentrated around the mud lithofacies. Gypsum crystal sizes increase toward the center of the playa.

== Interpretation ==
=== Gypsum ===
Past studies have determined that the gypsum occurring in Bristol Lake precipitated displacively within the sediment where groundwater saturated with gypsum recharges around the mud lithofacies. This is supported by the geometry of the deposit and by chemical data, which suggests that water precipitating gypsum in the playa is more associated with groundwater than the brine at the basin center. The large size of the gypsum crystals may be due to several reasons; inflow waters containing low Ca/SO_{4} ratios may result in large lenticular crystals, microorganisms have the potential to rework large lenticular crystals, high concentrations of NaCl in inflow waters can decrease nucleation density of minerals resulting in larger crystal sizes. It is likely that a combination of these processes was needed in order to form the gypsum crystals mentioned because gypsum crystals formed from low Ca/SO_{4} ratios or from microbial activity alone would not result in gypsum crystals large enough, and because gypsum crystal size increases toward the center of the playa where sodium chloride concentrations are greatest.

=== Halite ===
Thin crusts and hopper-shaped halite crystals that occur in the sediment are caused by evaporative growth from capillary brines discharging at the surface.

=== Mud ===
Sediment mineral composition found in the desert saline sediments of southern California are predominantly influenced by the composition of the source rock, this is true for Bristol Lake as well.

=== Possible magma chamber ===
The brine chemistries at Bristol Lake are different from those predicted to form by the evaporative concentrations of the two inflow waters currently accounted for.

1. Na-HCO_{3}-SO_{4} will precipitate CaCO_{3} which will deplete the water in calcium. These waters evolve into Na-HCO_{3}-CO_{3}-Cl-SO_{4} brines with minor magnesium and potassium. They will precipitate halite, Na-Sulfate, and Na-carbonate mineral upon further evaporation.
2. Cl-SO_{4} is predicted to precipitate calcite and then gypsum and form neutral Na-SO_{4}-Cl brines with subordinate K and Mg. These brines are predicted to precipitate halite and sodium-sulfate salts during further evaporative concentration.

The basin center brines of BDL (saline mudflats and saline pan areas) are Na-Ca-Cl rich with lower concentrations of potassium and magnesium and little sulfate and bicarbonate. Differing from their predicted chemical composition mostly by lacking sulfate, carbonate and bicarbonate and having high levels of chlorine.

Rosen 1991 attributed increased concentration of chlorine to be from atmospheric precipitation, however the Ca-Cl concentrations present at Bristol Lake are not compatible with normal low temperature surface weathering and evaporative concentration processes.

It is speculated that a magma chamber drives the formation of Ca-Cl brines at elevated temperatures and drives the transportation of these brines to the surface. Other evidence of a magma chamber in the area is the Amboy Crater and its associated lava flows, which occur directly North of Bristol Lake.

== Industry ==
A salt evaporator operation is situated on the dry lake bed just east of Amboy Road.

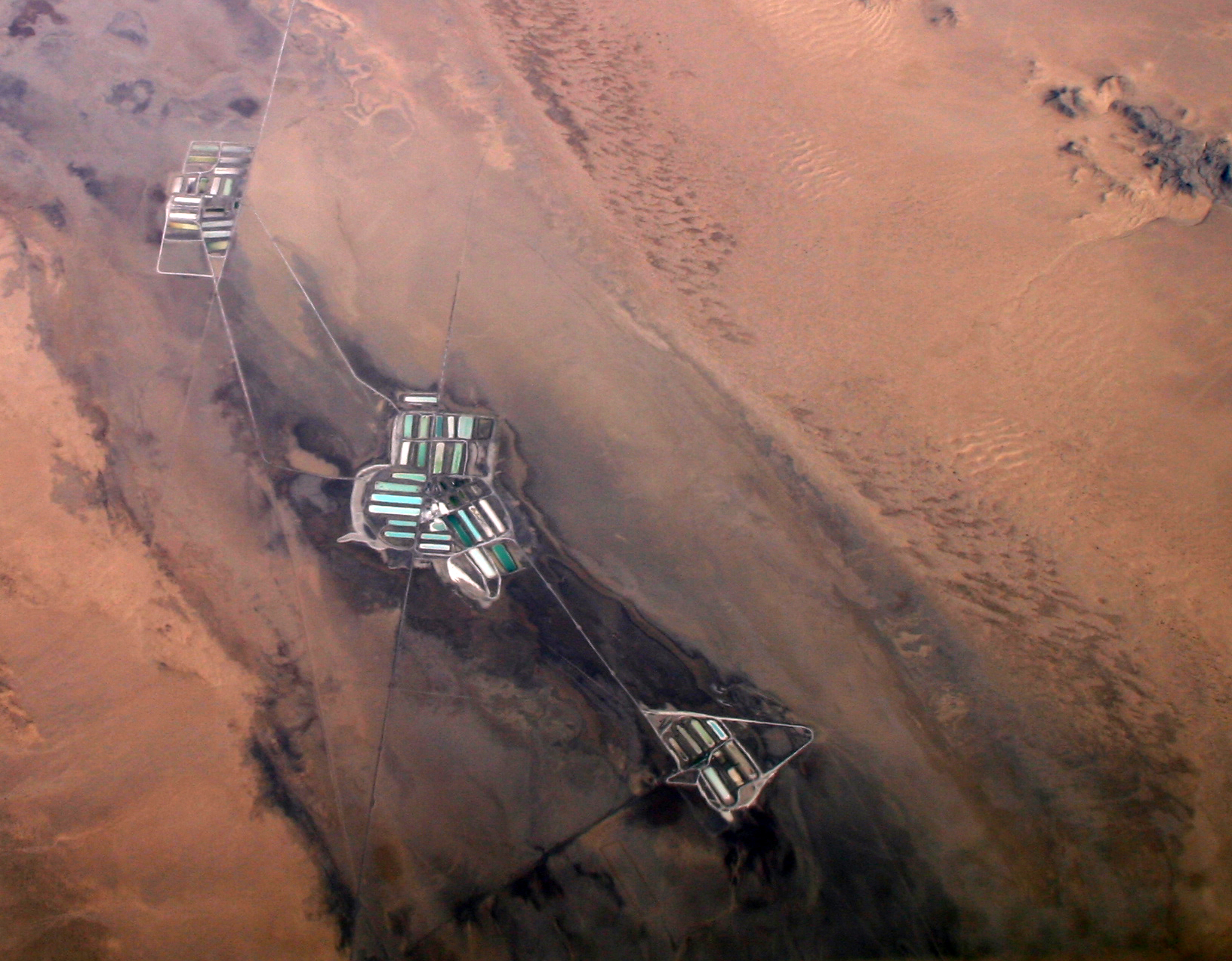
Salt evaporators in Bristol Dry Lake

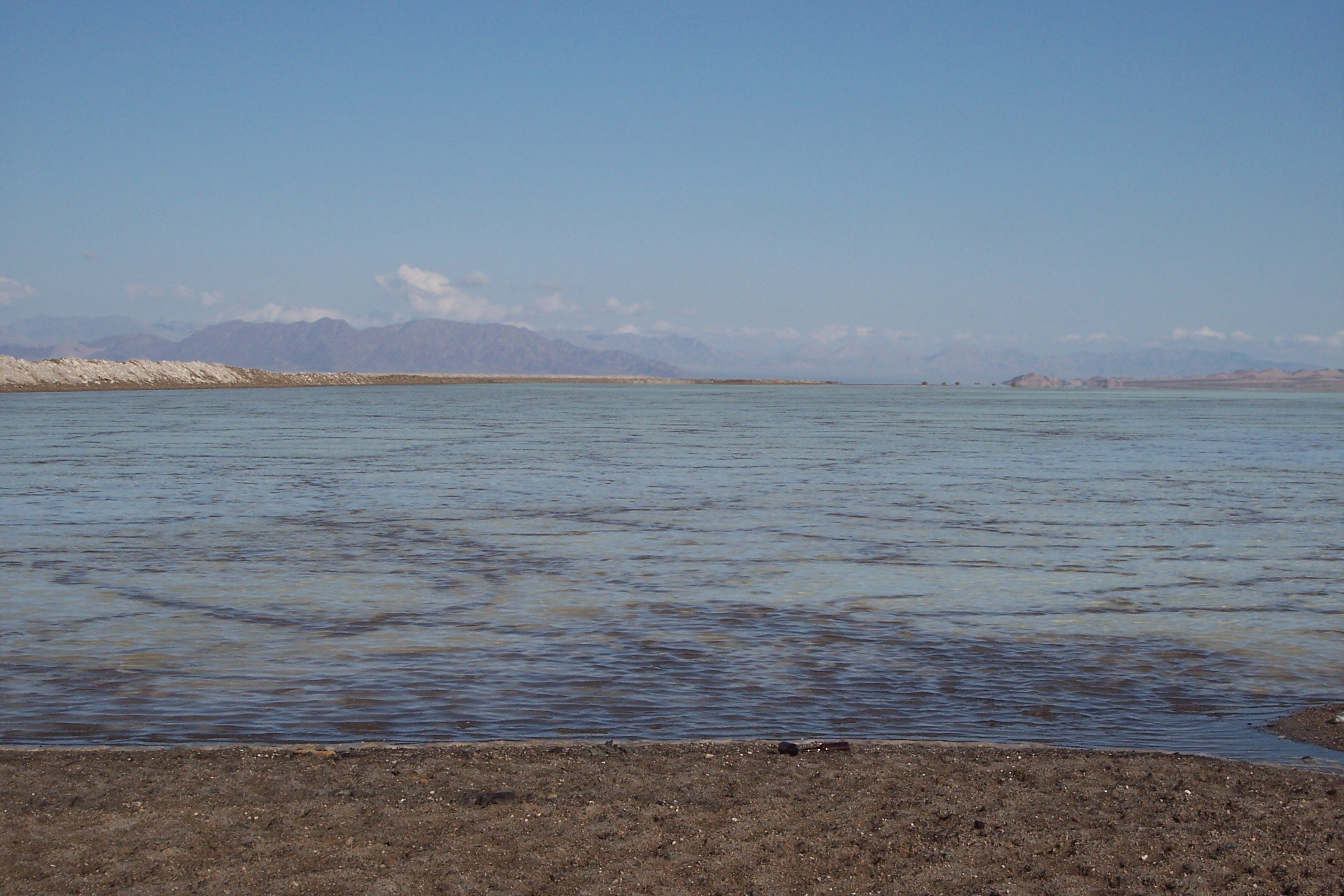
Bristol Dry Lake after a rainfall

== See also ==
- List of lakes in California
