= Pisgah Crater =

Volcanic cinder cone in San Bernardino County, California, United States

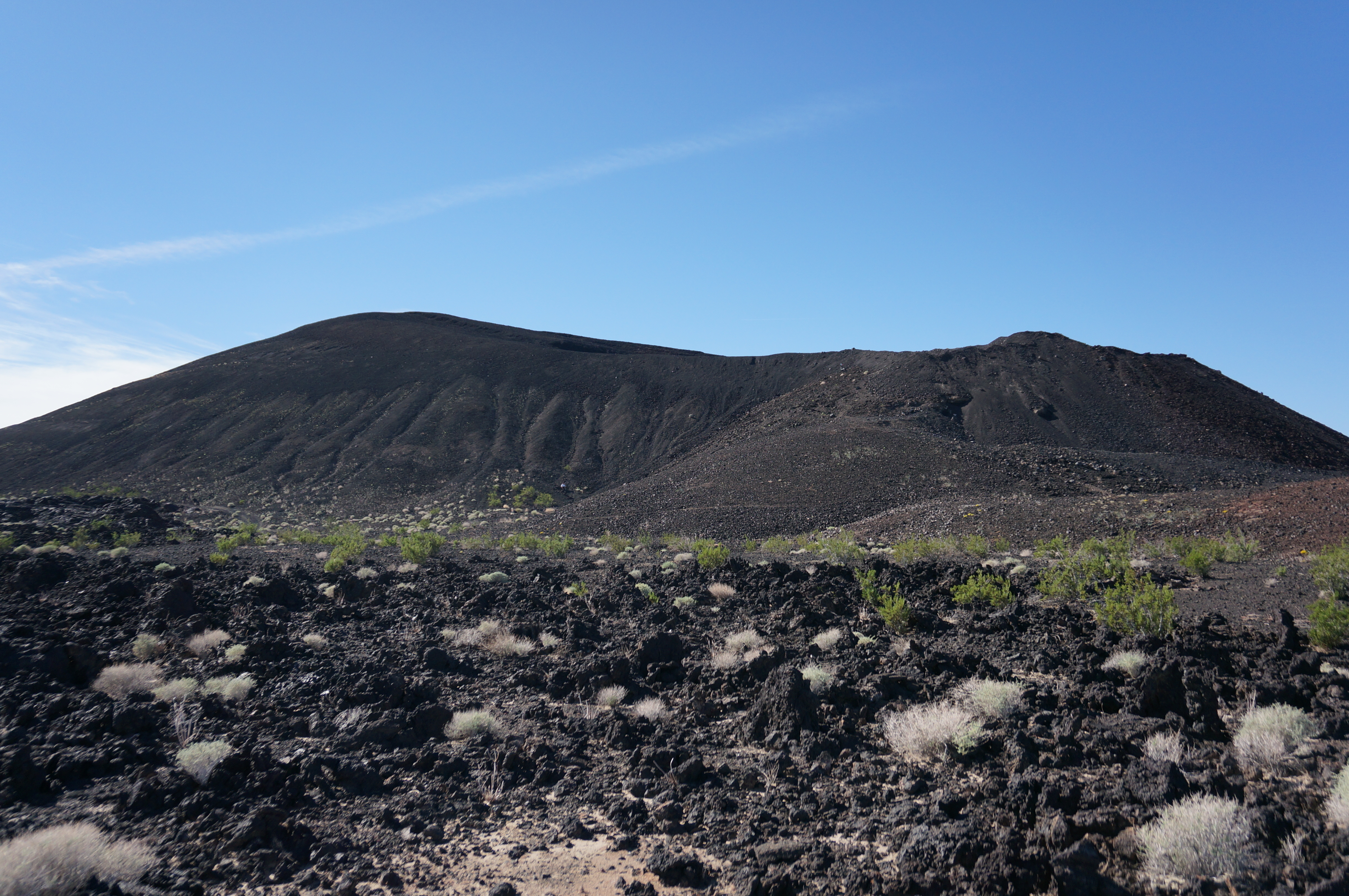

Highest point
- Elevation: 2,545 ft (776 m) NAVD 88
- Prominence: 353 ft (108 m)
- Coordinates: 34°44′47″N 116°22′30″W

Geography
- Location within southern California Location within California Location within the United States

Geology
- Mountain type: Cinder Cone
- Volcanic arc: Lavic Lake volcanic field
- Last eruption: c. 20,000 years BP

Pisgah Crater, or Pisgah Volcano, is a young volcanic cinder cone rising above a lava plain in the Mojave Desert, between Barstow and Needles, California in San Bernardino County, California. The volcanic peak is around 2.5 miles (4.0 km) south of historic U.S. Route 66-National Old Trails Highway and of Interstate 40, and west of the town of Ludlow. The volcano had a historic elevation of 2,638 feet (804 m), but has been reduced to 2,545 feet (776 m) due to mining.

== History ==
The volcano was the site of the Mount Pisgah Volcanic Cinders Mine, a cinder quarry that produced pumice for commercial use, the primary end product being railroad ballast for the Santa Fe Railroad. The mountain is currently owned by Can-Cal Resources Limited, a Canadian company specializing in exploration of precious minerals in California.

Mining has had a severe environmental impact; the top of the mountain has been removed and the sides of this historically symmetrical mountain have been scoured into an irregular shape. The mountain is still occasionally quarried for various cinder products, and sand from the mountain was used to depict the black sands of Iwo Jima in the film Letters from Iwo Jima.

== Geography ==
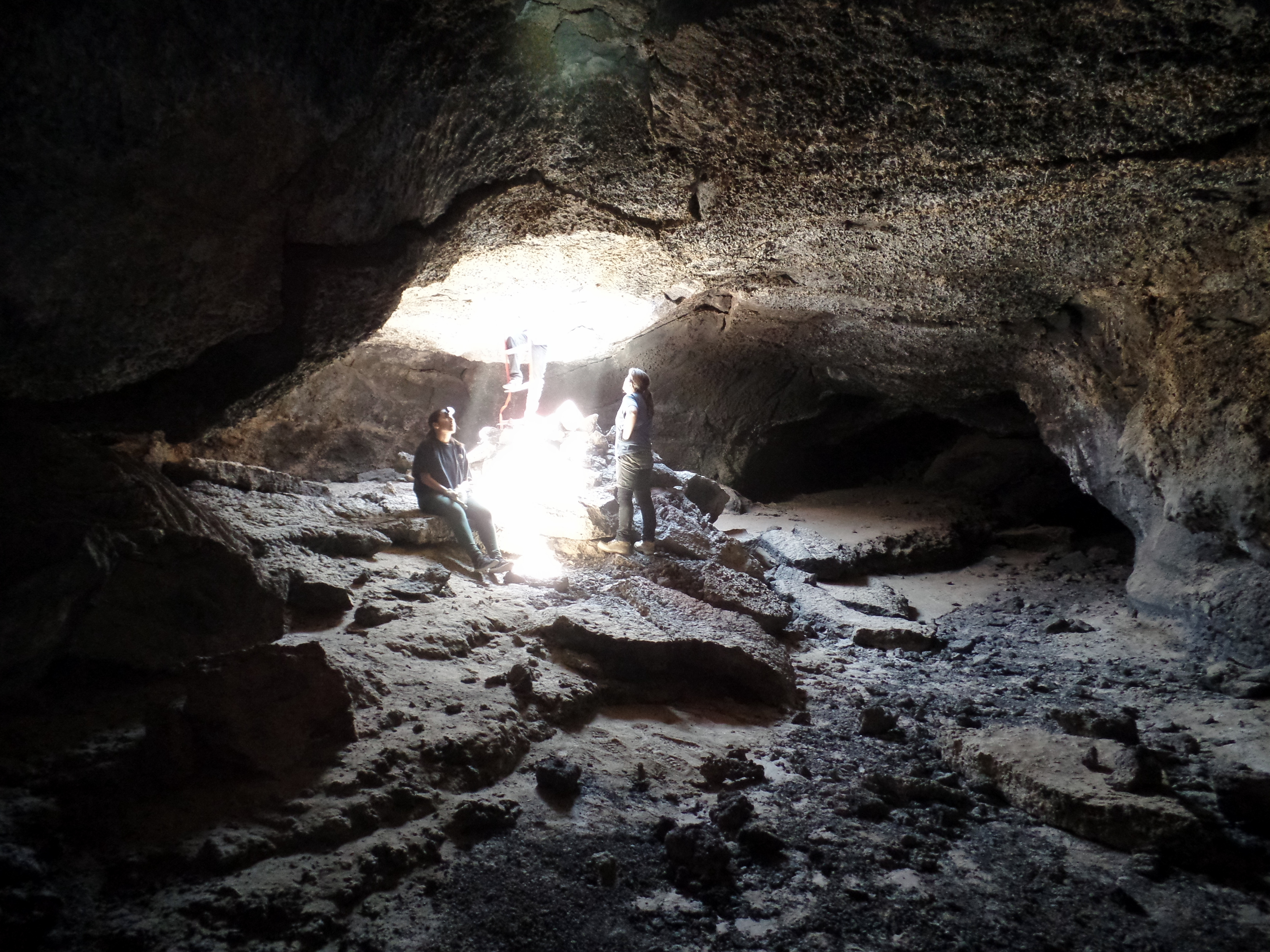
SPJ Cave

Currently, the crater stands 98 meters (321 feet) above the surrounding High Desert terrain, and has a base diameter of 488 meters (1,600 feet). It has lost much of its original cinder cone shape to ongoing aggregate mining operations, in addition to minor natural erosion.

The mountain contains a large number of lava tubes, which are frequented by cavers. The most well known cave is the 1,300-foot (400 m)-long SPJ Cave.

Located in the Basin and Range Province, the Mojave Valley and then the Cady Mountains lie to the north of the peak, while the Rodman Mountains lie to the west. The Lava Bed Mountains lie to the south, and the Bullion Mountains lie to the southeast.

=== Recreation ===
The crater and much of the surrounding lava field are on private property. Despite this, the lava tubes in the area are a somewhat popular and easily accessible destination for caving. Historic Lavic Siding is to the east, with the Mojave National Preserve beyond.

== Geology ==
There is no reliable date of when Pisgah Crater last erupted. Some believe that Pisgah Volcano is the youngest vent, of four cinder cones, in the Lavic Lake volcanic field. There may have been activity at this site as recently as 2,000 years ago; however others believe that the last eruption occurred as early as 20,000 to 50,000 years ago. It is too young for the potassium-argon dating technique, commonly used on specimens over 100,000 years old; as the volcano is basaltic, finding a reliable source of potassium for dating purposes would be difficult anyway. No charred organic material for radiocarbon dating has been found.

Lava at nearby and similarly active Amboy Crater is interbedded with Bristol Playa sediments at a depth of about 9 meters (30 feet) which are approximately 100,000 years old. Recent argon-argon dating reveals an age of approximately 18,000 years ± 5,000 years (~90% certainty) for the most recent flow. dating with chlorine surface exposure gave a somewhat similar age of 22,500 ± 2,600 years

Lava flows extend 18 km (11 mi) to the west and 8 km (5.0 mi) to southeast of the cone, containing basalt primarily of the pahoehoe texture, with some a'a. The flows contain numerous lava tubes and caves. The cindercone volcano itself shows signs of oxidization prominent in the reddish/orange/brown appearance of much of the upper portions.

The volcano is a very popular field site for geology instruction. On some weekends, it is not uncommon to find university classes and professional seminar groups around the mountain. Quarrying operations and geological survey activity also occurs at the mountain every so often.

=== Eruptive history ===
The volcano erupted at least three times, emptying the magma chamber below. All three eruptions produced porphyritic basalt, although rocks from the first eruptive phase are almost aphanitic. The first eruption was a basaltic flow that created the extensive lava fields visible from Interstate 40. Due to evidence from intrusive structures, it is believed that the cinder cone was formed around this time, although rocks from this eruptive phase are not present on the surface of the cinder cone. The second phase produced similarly extensive flows, while the third eruption produced substantial amounts of tephra. It is believed that most of the present cinder cone consists of pyroclastic material that originated from this final eruption.

=== Composition ===
The lava found around the volcano consists of a'a and pahoehoe, with considerable concentrations of olivine (weathering to iddingsite) and plagioclase. Large amounts of gypsum can be found coating rocks near the cinder cone.

== See also ==
- Lavic Lake volcanic field
- Amboy Crater
- Cima volcanic field
  - Mojave National Preserve
  - Providence Mountains State Recreation Area
  - Mitchell Caverns
- Coso Volcanic Field
