= Eastman Lake =

- Location within California Location within the United States
- Location: Madera / Mariposa counties, California, United States
- Coordinates: 37.2166°N 119.9843°W
- Lake type: Reservoir
- Primary inflows: Chowchilla River
- Primary outflows: Chowchilla River; Terminal (evaporation)
- Basin countries: United States
- Surface area: 1,780 acres (720 ha)
- Surface elevation: 138 m (453 ft)
- References: U.S. Geological Survey Geographic Names Information System: Eastman Lake

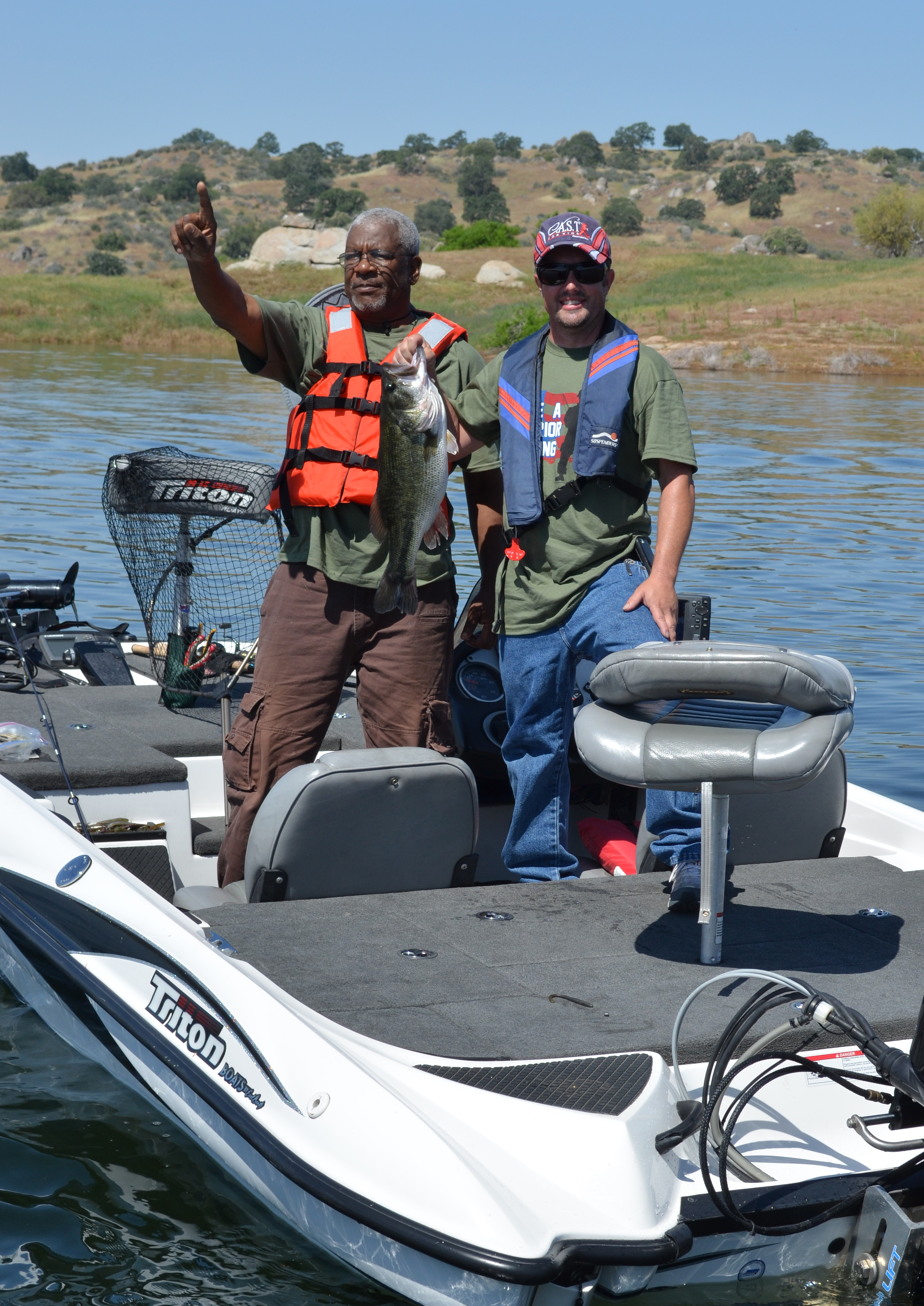
A veteran and a local volunteer showoff their catch during the "Take a Warrior Fishing" event. May 12, 2012.

H. V. Eastman Lake (commonly known as Eastman Lake) is an artificial lake in the Sierra Nevada foothills of Madera County, California. A small percentage of the northwest area of the reservoir is in Mariposa County. The lake was named in honor of Judge H. V. Eastman (1891–1972) who had served as Secretary Manager of the Chowchilla Water District.

The lake formed in 1975 (51 years ago) from the construction of Buchanan Dam across the Chowchilla River as a flood control and irrigation project of the United States Army Corps of Engineers. The earthen dam, 218 feet (66 m) high with a length of 1,746 feet (532 m) at the crest, impounding a maximum capacity of 150,000 acre-feet of Chowchilla River water in the reservoir, is owned and operated by the Corps.

The damsite was proposed for one of Project Plowshare's nuclear excavation projects, with a 10-kiloton nuclear explosion proposed under Project Travois for 1970 to create about 2,000,000 cubic yards (1,500,000 m^{3}) of aggregate for dam construction. The proposal was abandoned, and the dam was constructed by conventional means.

== See also ==
- List of dams and reservoirs in California
- List of lakes in California
