= Project Carryall =

1963 American nuclear excavation proposal

Coordinates: 34°42′0″N 115°46′50″W

Project Carryall was a 1963 United States Atomic Energy Commission (AEC) proposal to use nuclear explosives to excavate a path for Interstate 40 (I-40) and the Atchison, Topeka and Santa Fe Railway (AT&SF) through the Bristol Mountains of southern California. The project was proposed as a component of Project Plowshare, which sought ways to use nuclear devices in public works and industrial development projects.

The nuclear excavation project advanced to planning in 1965, but the California Division of Highways withdrew from the project in 1966. The railroad proposal continued until 1970, after which it was quietly abandoned. The highway was constructed using conventional methods.

== Proposal ==
In the early 1960s, the AEC worked to publicize the Plowshare program for peaceful use of atomic devices. One of the first proposed projects was Project Chariot, which would have created a harbor in northwest Alaska with nuclear explosives. The idea caught the attention of the AT&SF, whose route through the Bristol Mountains of Southern California was longer and more undulating than desired. The AT&SF was studying a tunnel that would address the problems but was unhappy with the project's cost. At the same time, the California Division of Highways was planning the route for I-40 through the same area and was facing the same problems as the railroad. In 1963, the AT&SF approached the AEC for help, and a joint project was initiated with the AEC and Division of Highways. A feasibility study was submitted in November 1963.

The study proposed an alignment serving both the railroad and the Interstate Highway in the same cut, using railroad grading standards as a guide. The new location was about 10 miles (16 km) north of the existing alignments of the railroad and U.S. Route 66. The excavation was proposed to be 11,000 feet (3,400 m) long and, at its maximum, would be 360 feet (110 m) deep. A series of 22 devices ranging from 20 to 200 kilotons in explosive yield would create the excavation, as well as a separate device to create a crater that would contain drainage from Orange Blossom Wash, which crossed the site. Detonations would take place in two groups of 11 simultaneously-fired devices.

Predicted consequences of the detonations included a dust cloud seven miles (11 km) wide, extending up to 100 miles (160 km) downwind that would require the immediate area to be closed for four days after the explosions. "Occasional rock missiles" were expected up to about 4,000 feet (1,200 m) from the explosions. The nearest town was Amboy, which was not expected to be affected by the blasts to any significant extent. A greater concern was the effect on a nearby natural gas pipeline, for which testing would be required in advance of the excavation blasts.

After the initial waiting period, the site was expected to be suitable for regular 40-hour workweeks with no special safeguards, with the stipulation that post-shot surveys would be needed to locate and remediate any radiological hot spots.

Projected combined costs for the railroad tunnel and highway were $21.8 million (equivalent to $171 million in 2024). The nuclear method was projected at $13.8 million (equivalent to $249 million in 2024), not including the costs of the nuclear devices. Conventional excavation of the cut was estimated at $50 million (equivalent to $391 million in 2024). The cost of the nuclear devices was not quantified but assumed to be less than the difference between conventional and nuclear techniques. The actual cost of the devices was classified. A 1967 proposal for Project Ketch, another Plowshare proposal, listed the costs of nuclear devices to be (in 1967) from $390,000 (equivalent to $2.79 million in 2024) for a 24-kiloton device to $460,000 (equivalent to $3.29 million in 2024) for a 100-kiloton device. The proposal would have used 23 nuclear devices in total.

== Schedule ==
Project planning started in 1964, proposing site preparation in 1965 and detonations in 1966, followed by design work. Construction was to start in 1968 and be complete in 1969.

In 1966, the nuclear proposal was abandoned for the highway project, since the highway program was moving faster than AEC testing at the Nevada Test Site. The highway cut was made conventionally about a mile (1.6 km) north of the proposed nuclear cut. The railroad project continued. In 1970, the railroad cut was mentioned by the AEC as one of three proposed projects, but in subsequent years, the project was no longer mentioned.

The 67-mile (108 km) Bristol Mountains section of I-40, constructed using conventional methods, was completed and opened to traffic on April 13, 1973.

== Marker ==
The project is memorialized by a roadside marker in Ludlow, the nearest town to the west of the site.

== See also ==
- Tennessee–Tombigbee Waterway § Nuclear excavation study, a 1965 proposal for a larger nuclear excavation project
- U.S. Army Corps of Engineers Nuclear Cratering Group
