= Project Travois =

Proposal to use nuclear devices for large-scale quarrying

Project Travois was a 1966 U.S. Army Nuclear Cratering Group proposal to develop demonstration projects using nuclear explosives for dam construction. The project was proposed as a component of Project Plowshare, which sought ways to use nuclear devices in public works and industrial development projects. Several sites were considered in California, New Mexico, Idaho, and Oregon. None were pursued beyond studies, and all nuclear quarrying projects were abandoned by the end of 1968.

== Project overview ==
The project was intended to demonstrate techniques for dam construction through the use of a nuclear detonation to break up rock for quarrying purposes, or for a detonation in a steep slope, that would produce a landslide that could quickly and economically dam a watercourse. The project examined a number of sites in the American West, including California, New Mexico, and Idaho. The project was first proposed in 1966, and study continued into 1968.

== Buchanan Dam ==
The Buchanan Dam site in Madera County, California was the first site proposed for the project, in May 1967. The site had already been chosen by the U.S. Army Corps of Engineers for a dam, to be constructed by conventional means, and had been investigated for that purpose. The location was 35 miles (56 km) west of Yosemite National Park, on the Chowchilla River. (Note: Quarry location: 37°14′38″N 119°58′50″W) Dam volume was 2,650,000 cubic yards (2,030,000 m^{3}). A 10-kiloton detonation was planned for a site 2.25 miles (3.62 km) from the dam site, in Mariposa County, to create about 2,000,000 cubic yards (1,500,000 m^{3}) of aggregate for dam construction. The detonation was planned for the second quarter of 1970.

However, in 1968 the Nuclear Cratering Group's director advised the Lawrence Radiation Laboratory, which had oversight of all Project Plowshare projects, that in order to assure that seismic effects would not affect populated areas, a series of three seismic tests would be needed, using conventional explosives. The tests were initially called Project Angledozer, and later Project Excavator. The concerns about seismic effects, combined with worries about radiological issues close to populated areas, led to the cancellation of nuclear excavation plans for the Buchanan site. The dam was eventually constructed by conventional means, with Eastman Lake filling in 1976.

== Cochiti Dam ==
As one of the largest earthfill dam projects in the world, the Cochiti Dam project in New Mexico had been proposed as a possible candidate for nuclear quarrying, and was the next project in the list of potential Travois projects after Buchanan. By the time the Buchanan Dam site had been rejected, the Cochiti project was already underway using conventional techniques. The nuclear aspect of the Cochiti project was therefore abandoned. No detailed planning or investigation took place. (Note: Dam location: 35°37′14.33″N 106°19′16.45″W)

== Twin Springs damsite ==
The Twin Springs site on the Boise River had been proposed by the U.S. Bureau of Reclamation for a dam for more than 50 years prior to 1968. The project was planned to create a reservoir for water quality control, irrigation and power production, employing a 470-foot (140 m) high embankment dam that would require about 7,000,000 cubic yards (5,400,000 m^{3}) of rock fill. A site for the nuclear quarry was proposed about 1 mile (1.6 km) northwest of the dam site. (Note: Quarry location: 43°40′31″N 115°42′41″W) A 40-kiloton thermonuclear explosion was proposed to create the rock aggregate, with options for either a quarrying blast or a blast that would product a landslide into the canyon. The 40-ton conventional explosive detonations were proposed to calibrate the concept before the nuclear explosive was used, under Project Excavator. Estimates prepared for the project indicated a ten-percent cost saving, but did not account for nuclear safety activities or the nuclear device. The detonation was proposed for the third quarter of 1971.

Seismic studies raised concerns about effects on the nearby Arrowrock Dam, located downstream to the southwest. Other concerns emerged about fishery damage and water contamination. In late 1968 both the Excavator and Travois projects at the Twin Springs site were cancelled.

== Catherine Creek damsite ==
With the cancellation of the Twin Springs project, a new site was located on Catherine Creek, a tributary of the Grand Ronde River in Oregon. (Note: Dam location: 45°08′29″N 117°43′50″W) The Army Corps of Engineers project envisioned an embankment dam on the creek. The Catherine Creek site was proposed for nuclear quarrying in late 1968, just after the Twin Springs location was abandoned. A Project Excavator test was scheduled for the second or third quarter of 1970, with the nuclear detonation in the second or third quarter of 1972. No further action on the nuclear program took place. An environmental impact statement was prepared for the conventional project. The project was opposed by local organizations and the Confederated Tribes of the Umatilla Indian Reservation. The project was deferred in 1981, and entirely abandoned in 1990.
