= Nuclear Cratering Group =

Research group for peaceful nuclear explosives

The United States Army Corps of Engineers Nuclear Cratering Group (NCG) was an organization within the U.S. Army Corps of Engineers (USACE), located at the Lawrence Radiation Laboratory, which was involved in research on the potential uses and effects of nuclear devices for large-scale excavation and quarrying. The group's activities were focused on research for practical applications of nuclear devices, some of which were proposed for the Atomic Energy Commission's (AEC) Project Plowshare program for peaceful nuclear explosions. In particular, the NCG was directed to study excavation techniques for a sea-level canal across the Isthmus of Panama.

The Nuclear Cratering Group was established in 1962. It was reorganized as the Explosive Excavation Research Laboratory under the Waterways Experiment Station in 1971.

== History ==
The joint USACE/AEC program was established in May 1962 by Presidential directive, with the stated purpose of studying the use of nuclear explosive devices to aid in the construction of harbors, canals, roads, dams, and quarries. In particular, the program was proposed to support research on a new sea-level canal across the Isthmus of Panama or Nicaragua. While the AEC was chiefly responsible for nuclear explosive devices, predictive cratering methods, and execution of actual nuclear explosive tests, the NCG focused on high-explosive testing, nuclear excavation project planning, data compilation on cratering experiments, and engineering studies for the application of nuclear explosives in civil engineering projects. The project's first director was Lieutenant Colonel Ernest Graves Jr.

The NCG's initial role was to conduct experiments with non-nuclear explosives, compiling engineering data that could be extrapolated to the design of projects that would employ nuclear explosives, within the framework of Project Plowshare. The NCG was to plan and execute cratering experiments using conventional high explosives as calibration experiments that would lead to means of extrapolating the performance of nuclear explosives, the development of projects that might employ nuclear explosives, and in conjunction with the AEC, to plan and execute experiments using nuclear explosives. The study group was also tasked with a role in the development of military applications for nuclear excavation.

Studies examined issues surrounding drilling large-diameter boreholes that could accommodate nuclear devices, and methods of creating a series of craters to form linear excavations. Other work focused on radiological studies to establish safe times for re-entry to new nuclear craters.

The Nuclear Cratering Group was reorganized in August 1971 and renamed. The program spent about $175 million, and conducted 22 explosives tests. The U.S. Army Engineer Waterways Experiment Station Explosive Excavation Research Laboratory was its successor activity. Between August 1, 1971, and April 21, 1972, the activity was called the Explosive Excavation Research Office.

== Pre-nuclear projects ==
- Project Pre-Buggy I and II, Nevada Test Site (NTS), 1962-63
- Projects Pre-Schooner I and II, NTS, 1964-65
- Projects Pre-Gondola I, II and III, Fort Peck Reservoir, 1966-69
- Project Tugboat, Kawaihae, Hawaii, 1969-70

There were a number of smaller projects, mainly involving detonations of small explosive charges in various geological conditions.

== Studies ==
- Buchanan Dam proposed nuclear quarrying (Project Travois), using a 10 kiloton (kt) device
- Cochiti Dam, quarrying project under Project Travois. The study was proposed and abandoned in 1966.
- Twin Springs Dam, proposed quarrying project under Project Travois, using a 20 kt device
- Project Excavator, proposed high explosive excavation tests in support of Project Travois at Buchanan Dam, Twin Springs damsite, or the Catherine Creek damsite in Oregon, study 1966 -1969.
- Rampart Dam, proposed nuclear quarrying study. First proposed in 1958 before the NCG was organized, with discussions running until the dam project was abandoned in 1967. Edward Teller was an advocate for nuclear explosives for this project.
- Whitestone Narrows, Alaska, a study for 1 kt and 10 kt nuclear blasts to widen the navigation channel, proposed in 1964. A study was completed in 1968, which recommended that nuclear excavation not be used.
- South Point Harbor, proposal for a nuclear cratering project at Ka Lae on the island of Hawaii. Proposed in 1969, and a feasibility study was prepared in 1971.
- Canal connection between Lake Erie and the Ohio River basin near Warren and Youngstown in Ohio
- Divide Cut of the Tennessee-Tombigbee Waterway in Mississippi, using 81 devices from 10 to 50 kt, totaling 1.9 Mt
- Project Phaeton, a proposed one megaton experiment to support Isthmian Canal studies, proposed in 1962. Locations were proposed in several places in Nevada, at Amchitka Island in Alaska, an at Cima Dome in California.
- Camelsback Dam spillway and quarrying proposal on the Gila River, Arizona. A report in 1969 recommended a 5 Kt nuclear device to excavate the spillway and to provide aggregate for the dam. The dam project was abandoned after a NCG report found geological faulting at the proposed dam location.
- Chomly Cutoff, a small-boat channel between Cholmondeley Sound and Hetta Inlet near Ketchikan, Alaska
- Harbor enlargement at Yaquina Bay, Oregon, using nuclear explosives.
- Young Bay channel, Alaska, proposal for nuclear excavation of a channel at th north end of Admiralty Island.
- Small boat harbor at Shelter Cove between Fort Bragg and Eureka, California, using a 100 kt device
- Deep harbor at Kaunakakai, Molokai, Hawaii, 1966, using a 500 kt device
- Dam in the Bruneau River Canyon, near Boise, Idaho, 19663-1967 Part of Pre-Schooner II.
- Boca Bypass, railroad cut excavation near Boca, California, study in 1962
- Operation Breakup, conventional explosive tests in the ice-covered Blair Lakes near Fairbanks, Alaska.
- Projects Dogsled and Pre-Dogsled; proposed cratering tests at 11 potential sites in Arizona and Utah, 1963–1964.
- Project Gondola, nuclear cratering experiment proposed for potential locations in South Dakota, Montana or Nevada., first proposed in 1963 and deferred to 1969–1970, then cancelled. Gondola I yields were to be between 20 Kt and 200 Kt.
- North Slope Harbor, proposal for the use of nuclear explosives to create an artificial harbor on the North Slope of Alaska for oil transshipment, 1969.

=== As the Explosive Excavation Research Laboratory ===
- Drum Inlet conventional explosive excavation, 1971
- Project Libby, high explosive excavation in support of road construction at Libby Dam in 1972.
- Lost Creek, high explosive blasting experiment in 1972 in support of the Lost Creek Dam project.
- R. D. Bailey Lake, West Virginia, 15 explosive blasts supporting spillway construction in 1973.
- Sergius Narrows, in Alaska, a Plowshare program started by the NCG in the 1960s and continuing into 1970, when conventional test explosions took place, with follow-up in 1972. The project involved the proposed removal of Wayanda Ledge and West Francis Rock to widen the navigation channel. Recommendations for nuclear excavation were prepared in 1972.
- Trinidad Dam, Colorado, excavation experiments from 1971 to 1974, first proposed by the NCG in 1969.

== Panama Canal studies ==
In support of the NCG's assignment to study potential conventional excavation and nuclear explosive applications for new or expanded canals in the Isthmus of Panama, several projects were examined.

- Conversion of the existing Panama Canal to a sea-level passage, using conventional methods.
- A new sea-level canal to the west of the existing canal, using conventional methods.
- A new sea-level canal in the Darien Region of Panama, to the east of the existing canal.
- A new sea-level canal using both conventional and nuclear means in northwest Colombia.
- A new sea-level canal in the region of the Nicaragua-Costa Rica border.

The NCG's final recommendation proposed the use of devices ranging from 100 kt to 3 Mt for a new canal in Panama. Projected costs in 1970 were $2.88 billion using this technique. The report noted that additional testing using nuclear explosives would be necessary before the project could proceed, and that the largest detonations could not be tested at the Nevada Test Site.

== Nuclear projects (with the AEC) ==
- Danny Boy, NTS, 420 t, 1962
- Sedan, NTS, 104 kt, Operation Whetstone test, 1962
- Sulky, NTS, 0.9 kt, Operation Whetstone test, 1964
- Palanquin, NTS, low yield, Operation Whetstone test, 1965
- Cabriolet, NTS, 2.3 kt, Operation Whetstone test, 1968
- Buggy, NTS, five 1.2 kt, Operation Whetstone test, 1968
- Schooner, NTS, 35 kt, Operation Whetstone test, 1968

== See also ==
- Project Chariot
- Project Carryall

== Links ==
- History of the U.S. Army Nuclear Cratering Group at Wikimedia Commons
