= Amboy Crater =

Dormant cinder cone volcano in the Mojave Desert, California, United States

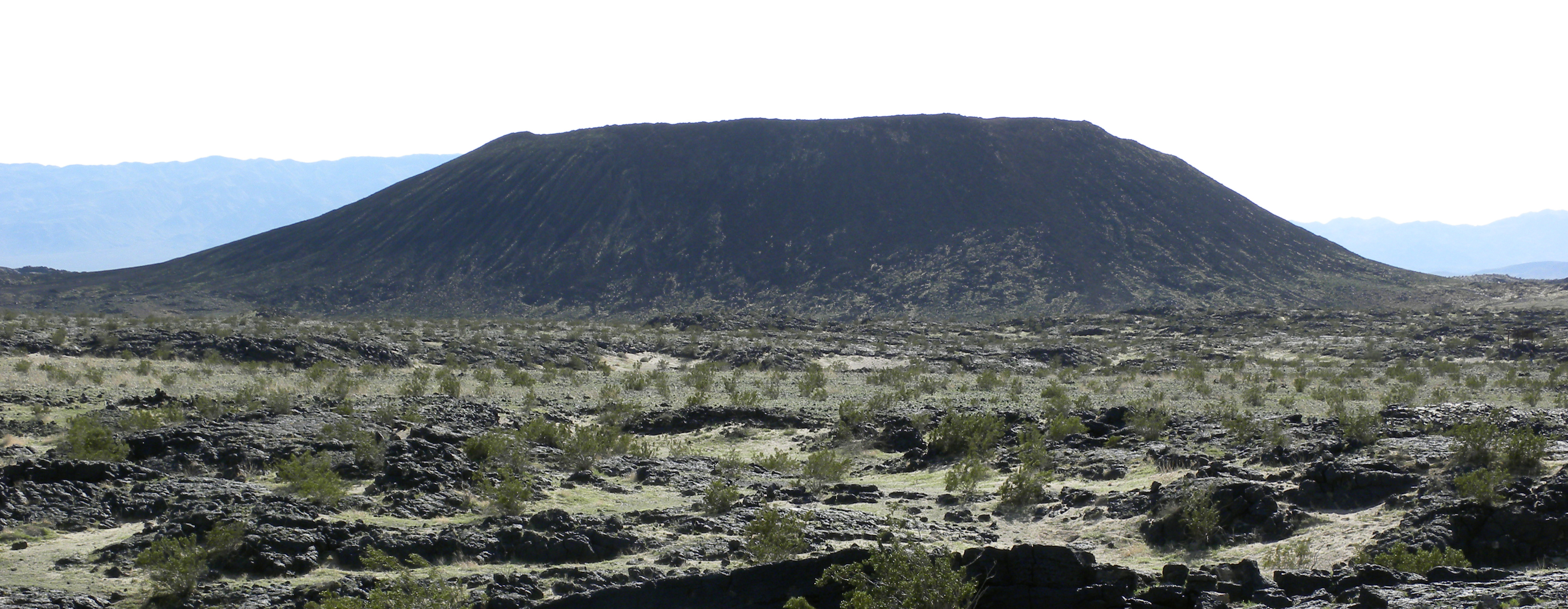
- Amboy Crater, as viewed from the east

Highest point
- Elevation: 944 ft (288 m)
- Prominence: 250 ft (76 m)
- Coordinates: 34°32′38″N 115°47′28″W

Geography
- Location within California
- Location: San Bernardino County, California, U.S.
- Topo map: USGS Amboy Crater

Geology
- Mountain type: Dormant cinder cone
- Last eruption: About 10,000 years ago

Climbing
- Easiest route: Trail

U.S. National Natural Landmark
- Designated: May 1973

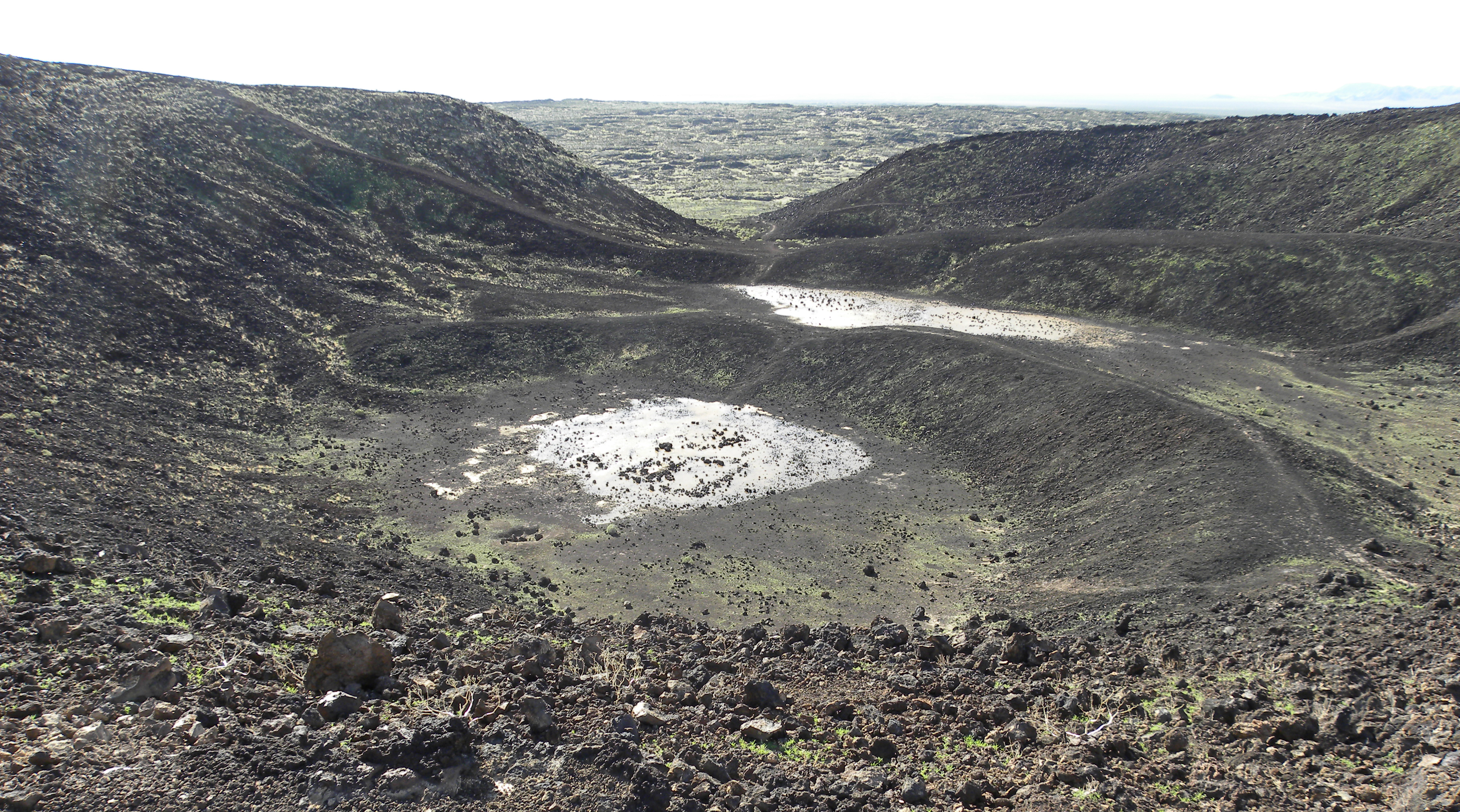
Interior of Amboy Crater showing a lava lake and the distant breach in the cinder cone rim.

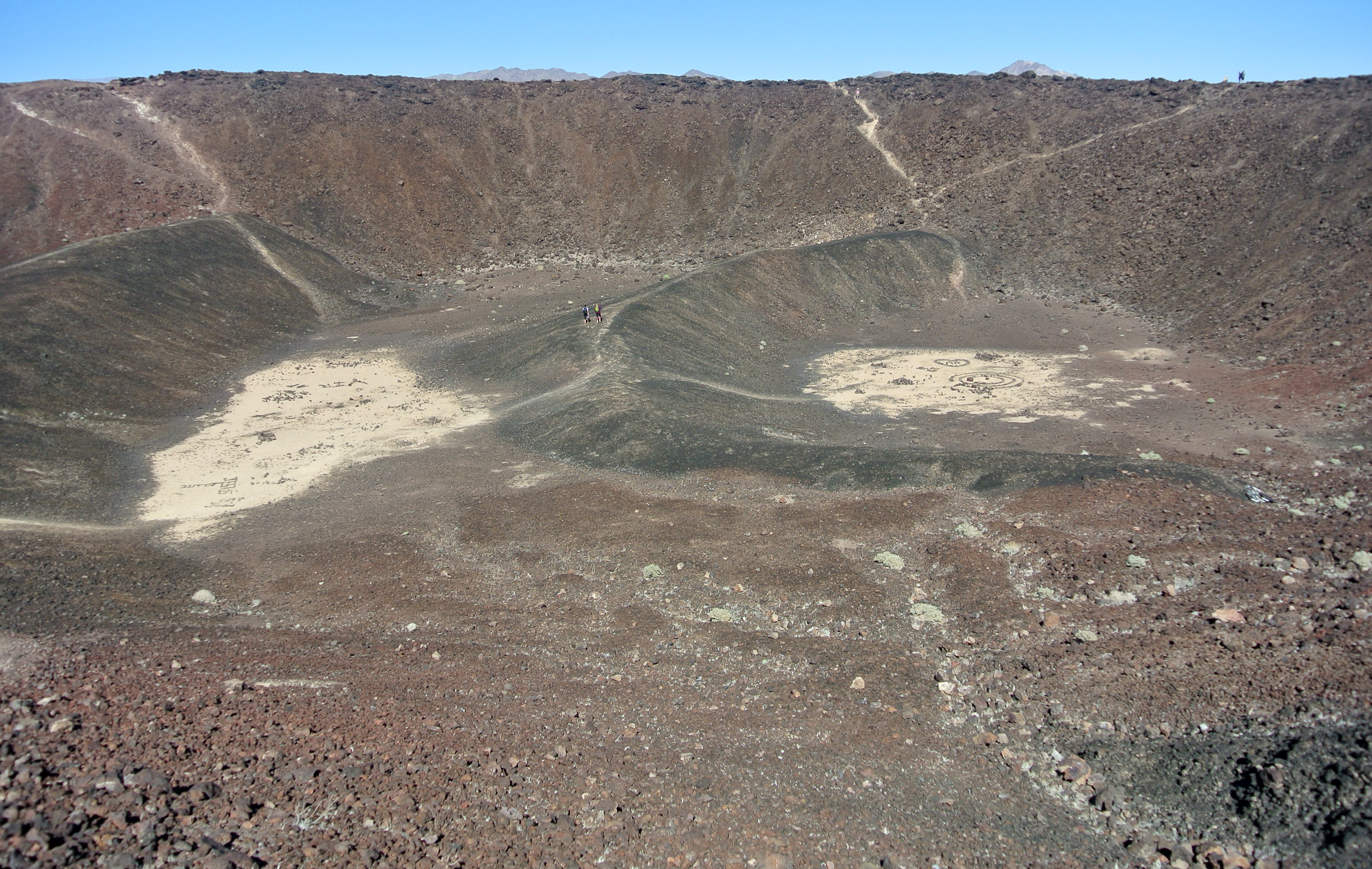
Interior of Amboy Crater from near breach showing lava lakes.

Amboy Crater is a dormant cinder cone volcano that rises above a 70-square-kilometer (27 sq mi) lava field in the eastern Mojave Desert of southern California, within Mojave Trails National Monument.

It is about 75 miles (120 km) equidistant from Barstow to the west and Needles to the east, and 1.5 miles (2.4 km) south of historic U.S. Route 66, near the town of Amboy in San Bernardino County. In 1973, Amboy Crater was designated the Amboy Crater National Natural Landmark.

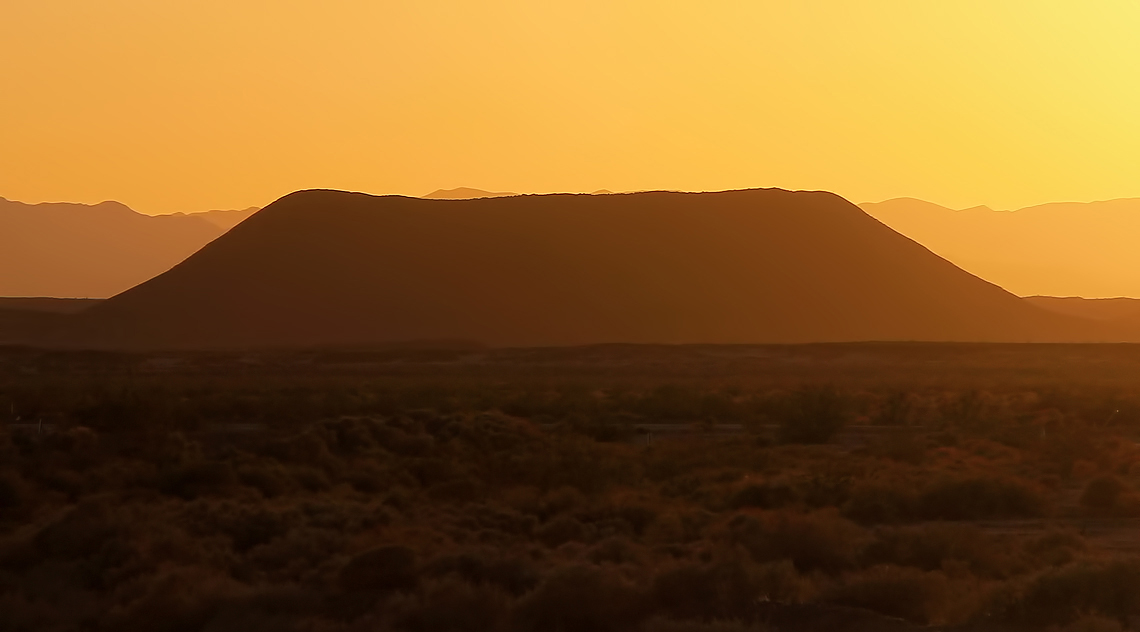
Amboy Crater at dusk

== Location ==
The crater's location is 2.5 miles (4.0 km) southwest of the town of Amboy and the Route 66-National Old Trails Road. The Bullion Mountains are to the west, and the Bristol Mountains to the northeast.

== Description ==
This cinder cone is estimated to be 79,000 years old (+/- 5,000 years) and was formed in layers of mostly vesicular pāhoehoe during the Pleistocene geological period. The interior has a solidified lava lake. Lava flows as old as Amboy Crater blanket the surrounding area. The most recent eruption was approximately 10,000 years ago.

The crater is 944 ft (288 m) above sea level, about 250 ft (76 m) above the surrounding basalt lava fields. The scenic and solitary Amboy Crater was a popular sight and stop for travelers on U.S. Route 66 in California before the opening of Interstate 40 in 1973. Other than a stretch of U.S. Route 66 in New Mexico, Amboy Crater is one of just a few extinct volcanoes along the entire route, so generations of U.S. Route 66 travelers from the 1920s through the 1960s could boast that they had climbed a real volcano. Visits decreased after Interstate 40 opened, but have increased in recent years with the nearby Mitchell Caverns, Mojave National Preserve, and renewed historical tourism interest in "old Route 66".

== Visiting ==
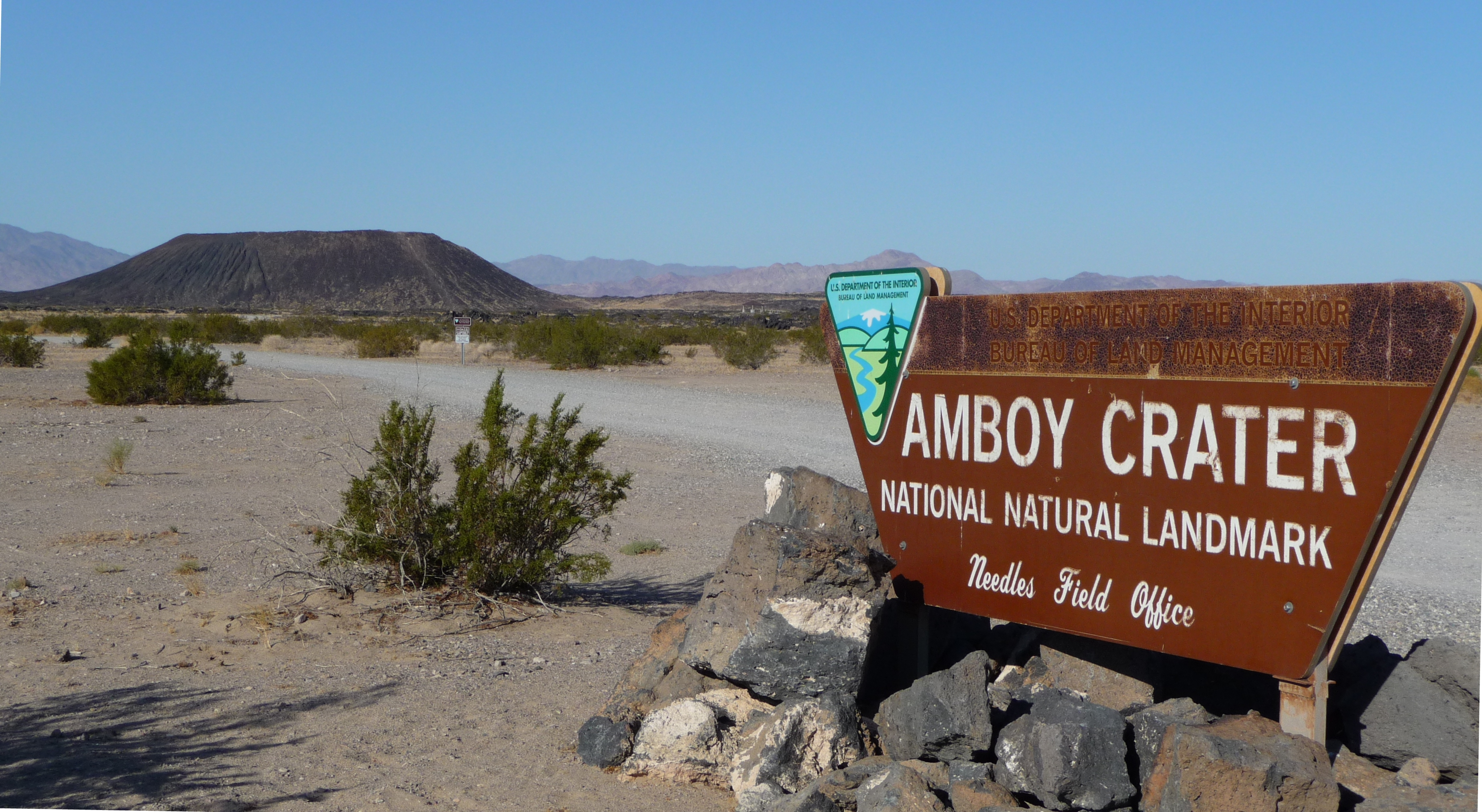
Amboy Crater National Landmark sign

The Federal Bureau of Land Management (BLM) recommends using the Western Cone Trail to reach the volcano peak's rim, a steep and rocky hiking trail. The trailhead is at the Amboy Crater day-use parking area, which provides shaded and open picnic tables and public restrooms. Regular desert precautions apply here: being alert for rattlesnakes and old military explosives, and having a hat, sunscreen, sturdy shoes and abundant drinking water. Educational and organized groups are advised to contact the BLM before going to Amboy Crater.

== Media ==
Amboy Crater was used as a location in the 1959 movie Journey to the Center of the Earth, with matte paintings used to alter the shape of the cone and place it within the landscape of Iceland. Fires were set inside the crater to simulate a volcanic eruption. Amboy Crater was also featured in the Viceland network show Abandoned, Season 1, episode 6: "Route 66". In HBO's From the Earth to the Moon Apollo 15 episode, Amboy Crater is overflown during astronaut training as a stand-in for the terrain of the San Francisco Volcanic Field outside of Flagstaff, Arizona.

== See also ==
- Lavic Lake volcanic field
  - Pisgah Crater
- Cima volcanic field
- Malapai Hill
  - Mojave National Preserve
  - Providence Mountains State Recreation Area
- Roy's Motel and Café
