= California Desert Protection Act of 1994 =

US federal law

Congress of the United States
- Enacted by: Congress of the United States
- Enacted: October 8, 1994
- Signed: October 31, 1994
- Introduced by: Dianne Feinstein (D–CA)

The California Desert Protection Act of 1994 is a federal law (Pub. L. 103–433) sponsored by Senator Dianne Feinstein, passed by the United States Congress on October 8, 1994, and signed into effect by President Bill Clinton on October 31 of the same year, that established three separate National Park System units in California's Mojave Desert: Death Valley National Park, Joshua Tree National Park, and Mojave National Preserve.

== Provisions ==
=== Wilderness ===
Designated 69 wilderness areas as additions to the National Wilderness Preservation System within the California Desert Conservation Area (CDCA), the Yuma District, the Bakersfield District, and the California Desert District of the Bureau of Land Management. Permits grazing in such areas.

=== Death Valley National Park ===
The Act abolished Death Valley National Monument, established in 1933 and 1937, and incorporated its lands into a new Death Valley National Park administered as part of the National Park System. Grazing of domestic livestock was permitted to continue at no more than the then-current level. The Act also required the Secretary of the Interior to study the suitability of lands within and outside the boundaries of the park as a reservation for the Timbisha Shoshone Tribe.

=== Joshua Tree National Park ===
The Act abolished Joshua Tree National Monument, established in 1936, and incorporated its lands into Joshua Tree National Park.

=== Mojave National Preserve ===
The Act established the Mojave National Preserve, consisting of approximately 1,419,800 acres (5,746 km^{2}; 2,218.4 sq mi), and abolished the East Mojave National Scenic Area, which was designated in 1981. The preserve was to be administered in accordance with National Park System laws. Hunting, fishing and trapping were permitted as allowed by federal and state laws, with certain exceptions. Mining claims were governed by the National Park System laws, and grazing was permitted to continue at no more than the then-current level.

=== Native American uses ===
The Act required the Secretary of the Interior to ensure that indigenous people have access to the lands designated under the Act for traditional cultural and religious purposes, in recognition of their prior use of these lands for these purposes. Upon the request of an indigenous tribe or religious community, the Secretary must temporarily close specific portions to the general public to protect the privacy of traditional cultural and religious activities.

=== Military overflights ===
Flights by military aircraft over the lands designated by the Act were not restricted or precluded, including overflights that can be seen or heard from these lands.

=== Appropriations ===
The Act authorized Congress to appropriate to the National Park Service and the Bureau of Land Management, for the fiscal year 1995-1999 period, sums not to exceed $36,000,000 more than that provided in fiscal year 1994 for additional administrative and construction costs, and $300,000,000 for land acquisition costs...

=== Additional findings and policy ===
Congress found that federally owned desert lands of southern California constitute a public wildland resource of extraordinary and inestimable value for current and future generations; these desert wildlands have unique scenic, historical, archeological, environmental, ecological, wildlife, cultural, scientific, educational and recreational values; the California desert public land resources are threatened by adverse pressures which impair their public and natural values; the California desert is a cohesive unit posing difficult resource protection and management challenges; statutory land unit designations are necessary to protect these lands.

Congress declared as its policy that appropriate public lands in the California desert must be included within the National Park System and the National Wilderness Preservation System in order to preserve the unrivaled scenic, geologic and wildlife values of these lands; perpetuate their significant and diverse ecosystems; protect and preserve their historical and cultural values; provide opportunities for compatible outdoor public recreation, protect and interpret ecological and geological features, maintain wilderness resource values, and promote public understanding and appreciation; retain and enhance opportunities for scientific research in undisturbed ecosystems.

== Background History ==
U.S. Senator Alan Cranston (D–CA) introduced the California Desert Protection Act as a bill for consideration by the U.S. Congress for the first time in 1986 and several times after, with his final attempt occurring in 1992. Around that time, on April 2, 1990, the Mojave desert tortoise was listed under the U.S. Endangered Species Act of 1973 as a threatened species, but there was still resistance in the U.S. Senate to any bill that would prohibit certain uses of the California desert, such as hunting and grazing, in order to protect desert life, even if such life included species threatened with extinction. Senator Cranston retired in 1993 and was succeeded by Barbara Boxer (D–CA), while John Seymour (R–CA), who was Cranston's fellow U.S. Senator from California and who opposed the bill, lost his election to challenger Dianne Feinstein (D–CA) that same year. In 1993, both U.S. Senators from California, Feinstein and Boxer, as well as President Clinton pledged support of legislation to protect the California desert. Several studies, lobbying efforts, and over 50 revisions to the bill authored by Senator Cranston followed before it finally became law in 1994.

== Timeline ==
January 21, 1993

Bill introduced by U.S. Senator Dianne Feinstein.

October 8, 1994

The bill passes the Senate cloture vote, 68-23.

October 31, 1994

The bill is signed into law by President Bill Clinton.

== See also ==
- California Desert Protection Act of 2010
