= California Desert Protection Act of 2010 =

Legislation proposed by U.S. Senator Dianne Feinstein

The California Desert Protection Act of 2010 (S.2921, 111th Congress) was legislation proposed by U.S. Senator Dianne Feinstein. The stated aim of the legislation was "to provide for conservation, enhanced recreation opportunities, and development of renewable energy in the California Desert Conservation Area."

== Overview ==
The bill consisted of two titles, the first affecting conservation and recreation and the second affecting renewable energy permitting.

The conservation title sought to create two new national monuments: the 941,000 acres (3,810 km^{2}; 1,470 sq mi) Mojave Trails National Monument along Route 66 and the 134,000 acres (540 km^{2}; 209 sq mi) Sand to Snow National Monument, which would connect Joshua Tree National Park to the San Bernardino Mountains, allowing for seasonal wildlife migrations and providing access to year-round springs in the Big Morongo Canyon Preserve. It would expand Death Valley National Park, Joshua Tree National Park, and the Mojave National Preserve, designate 344,000 acres (1,390 km^{2}; 538 sq mi) of additional wilderness on federal lands, and add 76 miles (122 km) of wild and scenic river designation. Finally, it would designate specific areas for off-road vehicle use throughout the California desert.

The renewable energy title sought to expedite wind and solar projects on private land, establish Bureau of Land Management (BLM) offices focused specifically on renewable energy development, and direct the military to study renewable energy potential on their unused disturbed lands.

S. 2921 (111th Congress) was introduced to the U.S. Senate on December 21, 2009, but it died in committee and was not passed into law. On January 25, 2011, an amended version was introduced as S. 138 (112th Congress), but it also died in committee and was not passed into law.

== California desert conservation and recreation (Title I) ==
=== New national monuments ===
The proposed Mojave Trails National Monument protects 941,000 acres (3,810 km^{2}; 1,470 sq mi) of federal land between Joshua Tree National Park and the Mojave National Preserve along historic Route 66 in San Bernardino County. The purposes of the monument are to preserve the nationally significant biological, cultural, recreational, geological, educational, historic, scenic, and scientific values in the protected areas and to secure the opportunity for present and future generations to experience and enjoy the magnificent vistas, wildlife, land forms, and natural and cultural resources of the monument. The monument will be managed by the BLM.

The bill permits continued use of the Mojave Trails National Monument for existing recreational activities including hiking, mountain biking, horseback riding, camping, hunting, trapping, rockhounding, and off-highway vehicle (OHV) recreation on designated routes. Furthermore, the bill authorizes the construction of transmission lines in the monument to facilitate the transfer of renewable energy. It explicitly does not create any protective perimeter or buffer zone around the monument and does not grant the government any additional authority over non-federal land within the monument.

Approximately $45 million of private donations and $18 million in federal Land and Water Conservation funds were spent to purchase land from the Catellus Corporation between 1999 and 2004 with the promise of conserving it in perpetuity. However, the BLM subsequently accepted applications to build solar and wind energy projects on these former railroad lands. The California Desert Protection Act of 2010 provides additional protection for approximately 266,000 acres (1,080 km^{2}; 416 sq mi) of these acquisitions, prohibiting disposal of this land or additional mining, rights-of-way, leases, livestock grazing, infrastructure development, or off-highway vehicle use.

The proposed Sand to Snow National Monument covers 134,000 acres (540 km^{2}; 209 sq mi) of federal land between Joshua Tree National Park and the San Bernardino National Forest in San Bernardino and Riverside counties. The bill maintains existing recreational uses, including hunting, vehicular travel on existing open roads and trails, camping, horseback riding, and rock collecting. This monument would be jointly managed by the BLM and the U.S. Forest Service.

=== Land additions to existing national parks ===
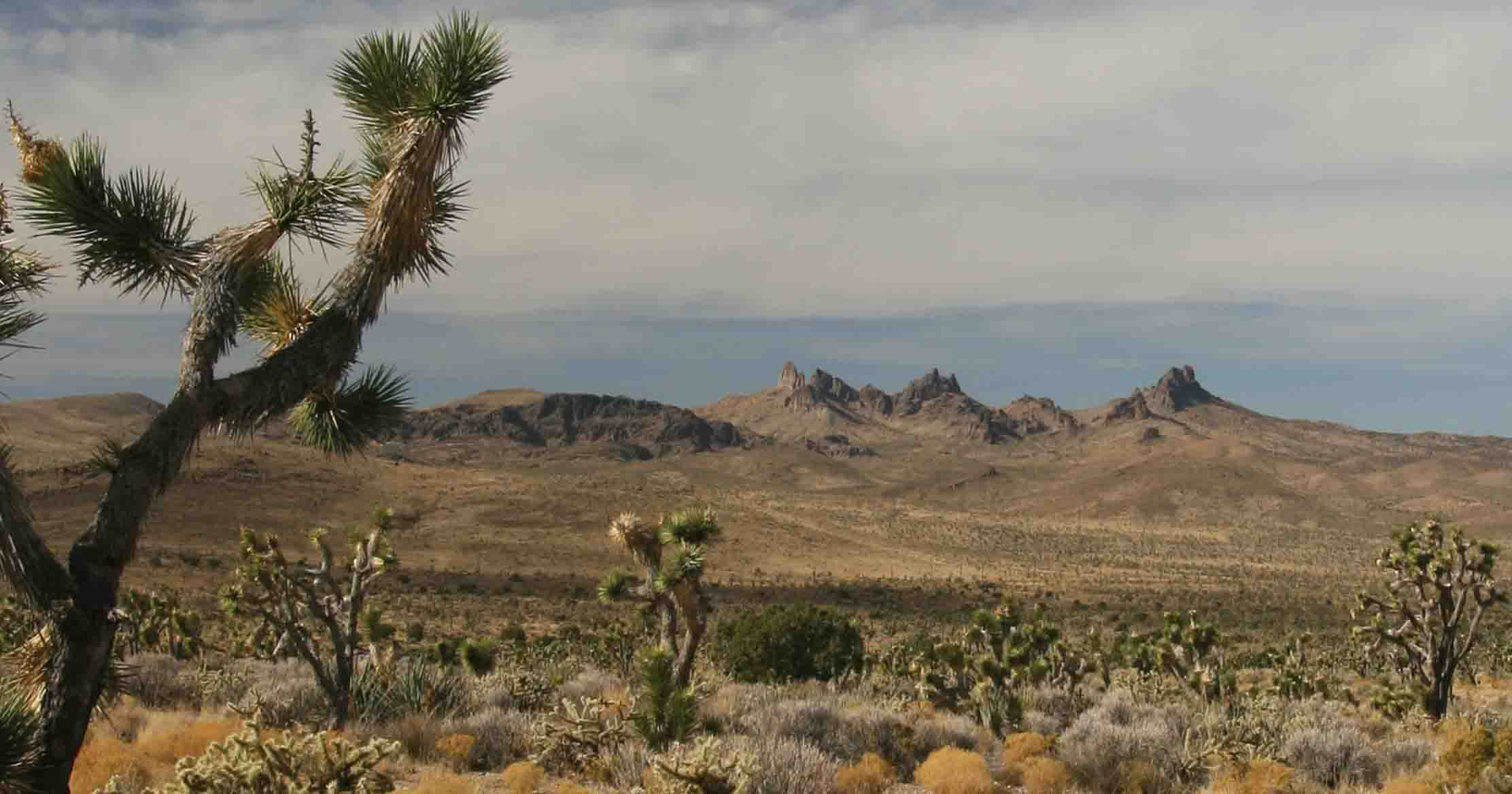
Joshua trees and the Castle Mountains.

The California Desert Protection Act of 2010 adds approximately 74,000 acres (300 km^{2}; 116 sq mi) of land to the National Park System. The additions to Death Valley National Park total approximately 41,000 acres (170 km^{2}; 64 sq mi). The largest parcel (31,000 acres/48 sq mi/130 km^{2}) is known as the "Bowling Alley"—a narrow strip of land between the southern boundary of the park and Ft. Irwin that was designated a wilderness study area by the California Desert Protection Act of 1994. The "Crater Mine Area" (6,400 acres/10 sq mi/26 km^{2}) is a former sulfur mining area in northern Death Valley that is entirely surrounded by Park wilderness. The bill adds a 29,000 acres (120 km^{2}; 45 sq mi) area containing the Castle Mountains on the border of Nevada to the Mojave National Preserve. This land was left out of the original California Desert Protection Act that created the preserve due to an open-pit gold mine that was still active in 1994. The mine has since been closed and the mining company has largely restored the land. The bill adds approximately 2,900 acres (12 km^{2}; 4.5 sq mi) to Joshua Tree National Park in the form of multiple small parcels of BLM land on the northern boundary of the park that have been identified for disposal.

=== Wilderness and wild and scenic rivers ===
The bill designates approximately 250,000 acres (1,000 km^{2}; 390 sq mi) of wilderness in five BLM Wilderness Study Areas near Fort Irwin as well as portions of Death Valley National Park (90,000 acres/140 sq mi/360 km^{2}) and the San Bernardino National Forest (4,300 acres/6.7 sq mi/17 km^{2}). It releases approximately 126,000 acres (510 km^{2}; 197 sq mi) in the Cady and Soda Mountains that were designated wilderness study areas in the 1994 California Desert Protection Act, thereby allowing vehicular access to these areas.

The bill designates a Vinagre Wash Special Management Area covering 75,000 acres (300 km^{2}; 117 sq mi) in eastern Imperial County in order to conserve, protect and enhance plant and wildlife management as well as nationally significant ecological, recreational, archeological, and cultural resources. The area contains approximately 49,000 acres (200 km^{2}; 77 sq mi) of potential wilderness and approximately 12,000 acres (49 km^{2}; 19 sq mi) of former private land donated to the federal government for conservation. Permitted uses include hiking, camping, mountain biking, sightseeing, hunting, off-highway vehicle use on designated routes and horseback riding. Prohibited uses include new mining, permanent roads, commercial uses, or activities that would preclude the potential wilderness areas from becoming wilderness in the future.

The bill stipulates that the 934 acres (3.78 km^{2}; 1.46 sq mi) Table Mountain Wilderness Study Area be transferred from the BLM to Anza Borrego Desert State Park, which surrounds it on three sides, to be managed as state wilderness.

The bill designates 76 miles (122 km) of wild and scenic rivers, including Deep Creek and the Whitewater River which originate in the San Bernardino National Forest and the Amargosa River and Surprise Canyon Creek near Death Valley National Park.

=== Permanent off-highway vehicle recreation areas ===
The bill designates four existing, administratively designated off-highway vehicle areas in San Bernardino County as permanent off-highway vehicle recreation areas. Land management would remain as it exists today, but the BLM would be given discretion whether to require a new site specific management plan or simply modify its existing desert-wide management plan. Furthermore, BLM lands in Johnson Valley that are not needed for the expansion of the Marine Corps Air Ground Combat Center would become part of the Johnson Valley Off-Highway Vehicle Recreation Area.

=== Cultural resources management ===
The bill requires the Secretary the Interior to develop a cultural resources management plan to protect the Xam Kwatchan Trail network extending from Avikwaame (Spirit Mountain, Nevada) to Avikwlal (Pilot Knob, California) that is sacred to Native American tribes in this region.

== Desert renewable energy permitting (Title II) ==
=== Funding renewable energy coordination offices ===
The bill stipulates the creation of renewable energy coordination offices to improve federal permit coordination for renewable energy and expedite the issuance of these permits. The offices would be funded with revenues in the existing BLM Permit Processing Improvement Fund, which can otherwise only be used for oil and gas permitting.

50 percent of income generated from renewable energy projects on federal land shall be used to replenish the BLM Permit Processing Improvement Fund, increase the size of the Federal Land and Water Conservation Fund, and establish a fund for the purpose of reclaiming any abandoned renewable energy project sites. The remaining 50 percent of income shall be given to state and county governments for the purpose of improving permitting and increasing conservation.

=== Accelerated processing of energy development proposals ===
Section 202 of this title establishes a process to reduce the backlog of renewable energy development proposals on federal land. This section imposes deadlines on both federal agencies and applicants to expedite the right-of-way and environmental review of renewable energy development proposals, to prioritize development proposals in which the developer makes significant progress, and to turn down ill-conceived and speculative proposals. Applicants who fail to meet deadlines will be rejected in favor of developers who make progress on their sites. The Bureau of Land Management would replace its first-come, first-served permit review process with a process that would give priority to renewable energy developers who have (1) completed their biological and cultural studies, (2) submitted an accepted development plan and a plan for securing necessary water, and (3) applied for an interconnection to the power grid. The Secretary of the Interior has used similar criteria to declare renewable energy proposals on a permitting "fast track". This section affects all applications for authorization to construct wind or solar electricity generation facilities in the states of Arizona, California, Colorado, Idaho, Montana, Nevada, New Mexico, Oregon, Utah, and Wyoming.

In order to expedite the site evaluation process, the bill provides a categorical exclusion for small, temporary solar and wind meteorological tests on BLM land, eliminating the requirement to produce environmental impact statements or environmental assessments for these tests.

=== Coordinated plan to develop renewable energy on federal land ===
Section 203 establishes a coordinated plan to develop renewable energy on federal land. It requires the Bureau of Land Management, the Department of Defense (DoD), and the U.S. Forest Service to undertake programmatic environmental impact statements of renewable energy potential on federal land, with the goal of identifying zones where renewable energy production is in the public interest, and where environmental approval of renewable energy projects can be expedited. The following section requires the DoD to study the potential of renewable energy development on areas of military bases in California and Nevada that are not needed for training.

As of May 2010, the Bureau of Land Management (BLM) was assessing the suitability of 351,000 acres (1,420 km^{2}; 548 sq mi) in the California desert for potential renewable energy development, significantly more than experts estimate is needed to meet state renewable goals. None of the lands proposed by S.2921 to be protected in national parklands, as wilderness, or as ORV areas are within these BLM study areas.

=== Mitigation requirements ===
Recent research indicates that, especially for protection of the desert tortoise, better and more active management of existing federal land is a more effective way to protect the species than acquiring additional mitigation acres in an uncoordinated manner. The bill establishes endangered species mitigation zones and requires developers proposing to develop private lands to contribute money to an endowed fund that would be used to better manage, in perpetuity, habitat for desert tortoise and other endangered or threatened species on at least 200,000 acres (810 km^{2}; 310 sq mi) of specified public lands.

The bill requires developers of renewable energy projects on federal land to purchase a bond to fund the eventual clean-up and restoration of these projects.

=== Advanced electricity transmission technology subsidies ===
The bill establishes loan guarantees and grants for advanced electricity transmission technology including underground transmission lines and increasing the electricity carrying capacity of existing towers.

== Timeline ==
October 31, 1994

The California Desert Protection Act of 1994 was enacted. Several Wilderness Study Areas (the Avawatz Mountains, Kingston Range Additions, Soda Mountains, Cady Mountains, and the Bowling Alley) outside the U.S. Army's Fort Irwin National Training Center were not included because the Army announced its desire to expand into some areas surrounding the base. It was understood by the people working on the bill, including environmental groups, Senator Feinstein, and Congressman Jerry Lewis, that once Fort Irwin finished its expansion, the remaining areas would become wilderness.

2001

The Army finished its plans for the Fort Irwin expansion and enlarged the base to include a portion of the Avawatz Mountains Wilderness Study Area.

2007

The California Wilderness Coalition (CWC) took Senator Feinstein's Deputy State Director, James Peterson, and her field representative for San Bernardino, Riverside, and Orange Counties, Chris Carrillo, on a tour of the Fort Irwin WSAs. They were impressed by the beauty of the areas and foresaw few conflicts to including them in legislation. When presented with a list of additional candidates for wilderness designation, the Senator's staff came back with restrictions upon the potential new areas that they would consider: 1) they had to be inside the boundaries of the BLM's California Desert Conservation Area (a vast region that encompasses most of southeastern California) and 2) they had to have had some conflict that had prevented them from being included in the original California Desert Protection Act that had since been resolved. Ultimately, 17 wilderness study areas meeting these constraints were identified.

April to August 2007

The CWC took Senator Feinstein's staff to each of the 17 areas, traveling over 3,600 miles (5,800 km) in nine days. The CWC researched each of the areas to identify potential conflicts that might arise from wilderness designation, and negotiations to resolve the problems were initiated.

December 21, 2009

Senator Feinstein introduced the California Desert Protection Act of 2010 (S.2921) in the United States Senate.

May 20, 2010

The Senate Committee on Energy & Natural Resources heard testimony about the California Desert Protection Act of 2010 from 10 invited representatives of the government, the military, off-road groups, environmentalists and energy firms.

== Reaction ==
Dianne Feinstein, who proposed the legislation, states that "conservation, renewable energy development and recreation can and must co-exist in the California Desert." "This legislation strikes a careful balance between these sometimes competing concerns." "We have worked painstakingly to ensure that this legislation balances the needs of all stakeholders. This bill, if enacted, will have a positive and enduring impact on the landscape of the Southern California desert, and I hope it will stand as a model for how to balance renewable energy development and conservation."

=== Nature conservation ===
The National Parks Conservation Association calls the legislation "a balanced bill that facilitates renewable energy development" and "encouraged Congress to take bold leadership for our parks and introduce companion legislation to S.2921 in the House of Representatives, so the bill can pass both houses of Congress and become a law."

The Wildlands Conservancy executive director David Myers testified at the May 20 Senate Committee hearing that "Ten years ago, prominent Democrats and Republicans alike saluted this donation [of Catellus lands] as a patriotic private sector [gesture]". "We urge the committee to support this legislation and to reaffirm America's tradition of wildland philanthropy."

The Natural Resources Defense Council (NRDC) "supports the goals of Senator Feinstein's legislation and believes that it is an important step toward balancing America's need to shift to clean energy with the need to protect unique and sensitive lands." Furthermore, "global warming represents an unprecedented threat to the survival of ecosystems and wildlife, including publicly owned resources, and the human communities that depend on those resources." However, it believes that Title II "would legislate matters that should be left to the discretion of the Secretary of the Interior, given the fact that renewables development on the public lands is in its infancy." Given the unprecedented scale of some of the proposed solar projects, "we really cannot know what the full range of impacts might be."

Johanna Wald, attorney for the NRDC, testified that "BLM and other federal agency staff have ... little to no expertise in renewables development on the lands under their jurisdiction." However, "they will learn a great deal from permitting the fast-track projects – that is, those projects that are potentially eligible for approval by December 2010." Thus, federal agency staff should be given adequate time to learn from experience. "The bill seeks to legislate ambitious and ill-conceived deadlines for BLM review of permit applications, placing a heavy resource burden on the agency, while also jeopardizing the quality of its environmental reviews. Rather than locking in deadlines for these critically important reviews, we believe that the Secretary of the Interior should be required to establish appropriate deadlines and to report to Congress on the effectiveness of those deadlines once established."

The Sierra Club calls the bill "an important first step towards achieving balance between the protection of public lands and wildlife in the desert and the pressing need for renewable energy development to address the challenge of climate change" and "strongly supports the wilderness designations, wild and scenic rivers designations and National Park expansions". However, it "strongly opposes the designation of the proposed OHV Recreation Areas", fearing that "this provision will set a dangerous precedent, which will significantly increase the pressure from OHV groups for such designations in any new public lands bills, not just in California but nationwide." Furthermore, "the Sierra Club would like to see the bill's tight deadlines for reviewing renewable energy projects relaxed."

=== Off-road vehicular recreation ===
The only representative to testify against the bill at the May 20 Senate Committee hearing was Harry Baker of the California Association of 4WD Clubs. Despite language in the bill permitting all existing uses of the land and specifically recognizing four off-road vehicle areas, Baker said his group fears that recreation would gradually be phased out of the protected areas. "We oppose legislation that denies the public's access to public land," he said.

Americans for Responsible Recreational Access called the act "a remarkable piece of legislation". "The bill is the product of more than three years of intensive work by the Senator's staff, with a wide variety of user interests, ranging from environmentalists to energy producers, the OHV recreation community, various local and state government officials, and the U. S. Department of Defense. The scope of the legislation is far reaching in that it facilitates solar energy projects in the California desert, authorizes new monument and wilderness areas, sets aside federal land for Defense Department activities, and from our standpoint, designates specific areas as federally recognized OHV recreation areas. The negotiations among the various interest groups, as facilitated by the Feinstein staff, were lengthy and difficult. No one group got all it wanted and everyone had to compromise on their own specific agenda. But, in the end, an agreement was reached that specifies how the California desert will be managed for the benefit of all Americans." "Senator Feinstein and her staff has been tenacious in their work on this legislation. They have been instrumental in bringing opposing sides to the negotiating table and they have been advocates for OHV recreation. We hope the Feinstein model of inclusiveness will become a model that others in Congress will use when developing legislation on federal lands issues."

=== Culture ===
"Visitors come from across the country and around the world to experience Route 66, its history, and our unique desert landscape," explained Jim Conkle, chair of the Route 66 Alliance. "This bill will preserve an important link to our past while also investing in our future."

=== Business and economic development ===
"The California Desert Protection Act would preserve the natural beauty of our home for future generations while also creating much-needed business and tourism opportunities now," said Karen Lowe, President of the Morongo Valley Chamber of Commerce.

=== Renewable energy development and electrical power transmission ===
"I hope the hearing demonstrates how balanced this legislation is, that it allows for the needs of conservation, renewable energy, recreation, and the military. It provides certainty for all stakeholders and a legacy for the future," said Fred Bell, Chief Operating Officer of Noble & Company, a desert-based renewable energy company focused on wind and solar power generation.

Pedro Pizarro, Executive Vice President of Southern California Edison (SCE), testified at the May 20 Senate Committee hearing that "We have worked long and hard with Senator Feinstein to make sure the proposals are good for our customers and employees and will help us meet the policy goals of the state of California." "SCE believes that the desert renewable energy permitting provisions of the bill will help expedite the development of new renewable energy projects. Some of the most noteworthy aspects of the legislation are the provisions designed to encourage the development of renewable projects on previously disturbed private lands through the creation of Habitat Mitigation Zones in the California Desert Conservation Area." "SCE also supports provisions establishing deadlines for actions by federal agencies. Just as importantly, the bill ensures that the agencies have the staff and resources to enable them to meet those deadlines by creating a dedicated revenue stream through solar and wind leasing revenues. Finally, SCE appreciates the language in the bill that expressly authorizes the company to maintain, upgrade, and replace existing transmission facilities in the monuments, including the development of a new east-to-west line." "I want to point out the extraordinary steps that Senator Feinstein has taken to build consensus for this legislation. She led a group of stakeholders including Ted Craver, Chairman and CEO of Edison International, two of today’s panelists, Mr. Meyers and Ms. Wald, and others, on a tour of the proposed monument site. Seeing the natural beauty of California’s desert areas made it clear why Senator Feinstein is so passionate about this issue. This act would conserve these spectacular and sensitive lands for the benefit and enjoyment of future generations." "This legislation ... is a win-win for the environment by conserving pristine land and promoting renewable energy projects."

=== Military ===
Dr. Dorothy Robyn, Deputy Under Secretary of Defense, testified at the May 20 Senate Committee hearing that "The Department's own analysis confirms that our military's heavy reliance on oil and other fossil fuels creates significant risks and costs at a tactical as well as a strategic level" and that "the military has been actively pursuing solar, wind, geothermal and other forms of renewable and alternative energy." Nonetheless, renewable energy projects sited on or near military lands may interfere with training, place additional burdens on the installation for endangered species recovery, and compete with the military for water. On the other hand, "the designation of large monument and wilderness areas as off-limits to development protects installations from the encroachment that such development could cause". "The bill incorporates many provisions that address and protect our operations." "The Department is, however, concerned with the time restrictions included in the bill." "We believe [preparation of the programmatic environmental impact statement] will take significantly more time than currently provided in the bill." "We strongly support the goals of S. 2921—namely, to advance renewable energy while protecting the environment and protecting our current and projected military missions. We will provide additional views on the bill in the near future."

=== Government ===
The Castle Mountains area "has unique grasslands that you typically don't find in the desert" says Mojave National Preserve Superintendent Dennis Schramm. "We think this grassland could be a really important part of bringing back a small herd [of pronghorn] that would spend nearly all of its time in the preserve."

Secretary of the Interior Ken Salazar told Senator Feinstein "We've come to understand that your legislation is exactly the right approach" at the Senate Appropriations Subcommittee on Interior, Environment, and Related Agencies hearing on March 9, 2010. "There are right places for there to be development, there are places that we ought not have development and I think, in working closely with you and the stakeholders in Southern California, we have achieved that balance."

At the May 20 Senate Committee hearing, Bureau of Land Management Director Robert Abbey said the agency is already on track to designate areas for renewable energy development by next year. While he supports the bill's goals, he called Feinstein's proposed timelines "unrealistic". Senator Lisa Murkowski suggested that it might be counterproductive to prohibit development before the federal agencies complete their assessments of which lands are best suited for solar and wind projects.

=== Supporters ===
Diverse entities officially support the proposed legislation, including

Conservation organizations
The Amargosa Conservancy, Californians for Western Wilderness, California Wilderness Coalition, Campaign for America's Wilderness, Conservation Alliance, Death Valley Conservancy, Desert Protective Council, Endangered Habitats League, Friends of Big Morongo Canyon Preserve, Friends of the Desert Mountains, Friends of the River, Mojave Desert Land Trust, Mojave National Preserve Conservancy, National Parks Conservation Association, Wilderness Society, and The Wildlands Conservancy
Off-road vehicle groups
The American Motorcyclist Association, Americans for Responsible Recreational Access, American Sand Association, Blue Ribbon Coalition, and the Off-Road Business Association.
Cultural organizations
The Big Pine Paiute Tribe, Timbisha Shoshone Tribe, and the Route 66 Preservation Foundation
Energy companies and utilities
Abengoa Solar, the Coachella Valley Water District, Cogentrix Energy, Edison International (parent company of Southern California Edison), the Los Angeles Department of Water and Power, and Noble & Company
Local governments
The cities of Apple Valley, Banning, Beaumont, Calimesa, Cathedral City, Desert Hot Springs, Hesperia, Indian Wells, Indio, La Quinta, Palm Desert, Palm Springs, Redlands, Riverside, San Bernardino, and Yucaipa, Los Angeles County, the Coachella Valley Association of Governments, and numerous individual elected officials.
