= Lava Bed Mountains =

Mountain range in California, United States

- Location within California

Highest point
- Elevation: 1,130 m (3,710 ft)

Geography
- Country: United States
- State: California
- District: San Bernardino County
- Range coordinates: 34°37′39.972″N 116°27′13.078″W
- Topo map: USGS Sunshine Peak

The Lava Bed Mountains are located in the Mojave Desert in southeastern California, United States. The mountains lie in a northwest-southeasterly direction, and are located almost entirely within the Marine Corps Air Ground Combat Center Twentynine Palms, which is a restricted area. The mountains reach a height of 4,488 feet (1,368 m) above sea level at Argos Mountain, and are found at the northwestern end of the Bullion Mountains. Gays Pass is located at the southern end of the chain, with the Rodman Mountains to the northwest. The Lava Bed Mountains are approximately 11 miles (18 km), and lie in the arid climate zone, characterized by little rainfall.
