= Lavic Lake volcanic field =

Volcanic field in San Bernardino County, California, United States

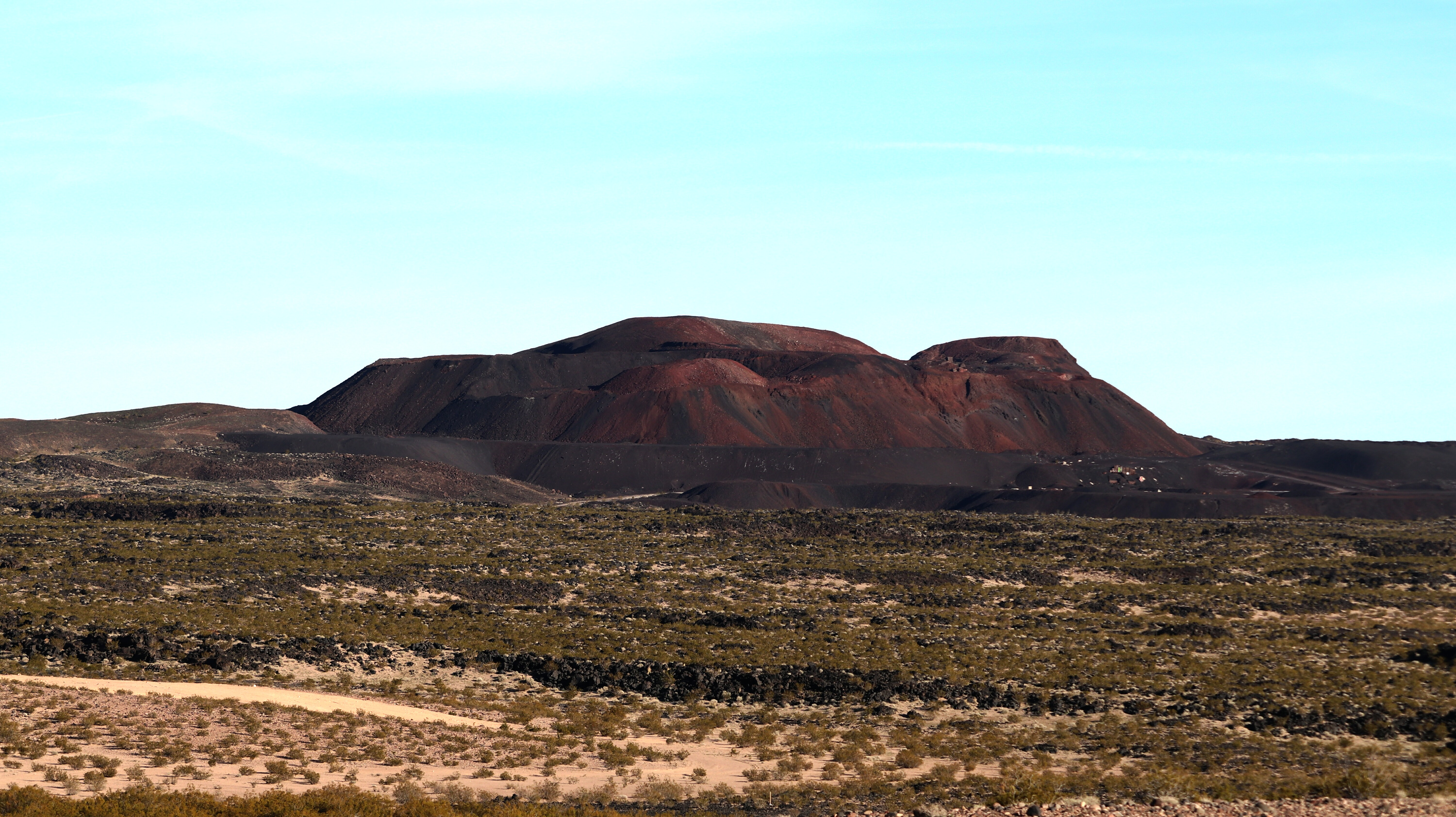
Pisgah cinder cone is directly alongside route 66 and highway 40.

Lava flows extend across the valley floor.

The Lavic Lake volcanic field is a volcanic field with extinct cinder cones in the Mojave Desert, in San Bernardino County, California, United States, at 762 m (2,500 ft) elevation. Its cones lie directly alongside historic Route 66 and modern Interstate 40, between Barstow to the west and Ludlow 10 miles (16 km) to the east.

== Description ==
The 100 km^{2} (39 mi^{2}) Lavic Lake volcanic field is a basaltic pahoehoe lava plain and has four Holocene (approximately 10,000 years ago) cinder cone type volcanos, three in the Lavic Dry Lake area, and a fourth located southwest in the Rodman Mountains. The oldest cinder cone, Pisgah Crater may be pre-Holocene, erupting around 25,000 years ago.

Of the four cinder cones, Pisgah Crater stands as the most accessible and prominent volcano in the volcanic field with a height of 100 m (330 ft) above the field with a peak elevation of 2,545 feet (776 m), at 34°44′47″N 116°22′30″W. The cone of Pisgah Crater has been modified by mining operations that provide a source of road aggregate.

The biome is the deserts and xeric shrublands, with smaller plants growing in soil pockets formed by erosion, sedimentation and wind deposits.

== See also ==
- Amboy Crater
- Pisgah Crater
- Cima volcanic field
  - Mojave National Preserve
  - Providence Mountains State Recreation Area
  - Mitchell Caverns
- Coso Volcanic Field
- List of volcanic fields
