= Malapai Hill =

Mountain in California, United States

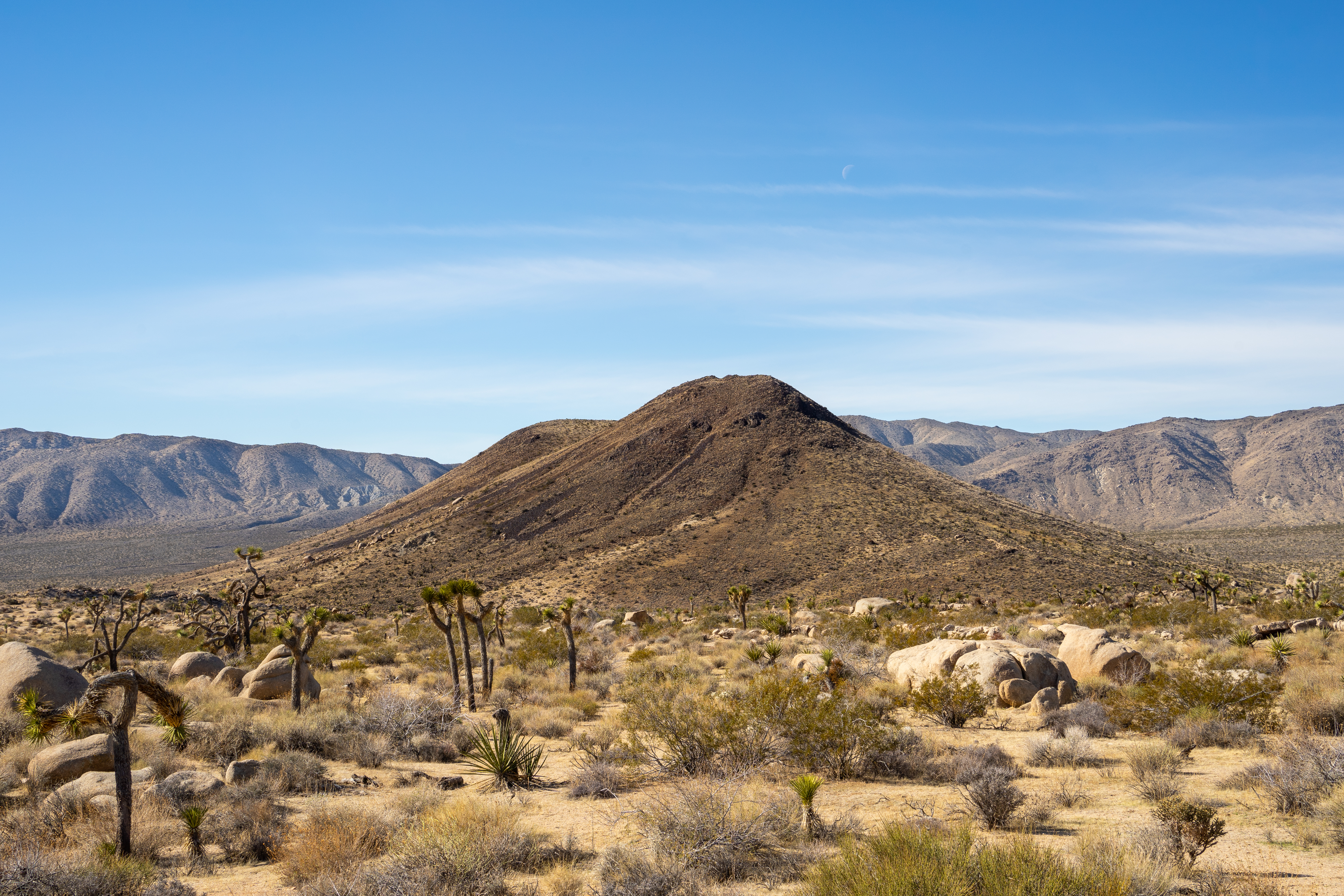
- Ground view of Malapai Hill, from the northeast

Highest point
- Elevation: 4,278 feet (1,304 m) NGVD 29
- Prominence: 360 ft (110 m)
- Coordinates: 33°56′23″N 116°05′16″W

Geography
- Location within California
- Location: Riverside County, California, United States
- Topo map: USGS Malapai Hill

Geology
- Mountain type: Volcanic plug

Malapai Hill is a small mountain in the middle of Joshua Tree National Park in southeastern California, which may have been part of an ancient volcano. It formed during a period of intrusive activity and either rose above the surface or eventually was exposed by erosion. Its name is a derivative of the Spanish word malpaís, which refers to badlands.

== Geography and geology ==
The peak rises in Joshua Tree National Park, west of the Hexie Mountains, north of the San Bernardino Mountains and near Queen Valley. Malapai Hill is the product of the intrusion of magma into White Tank monzogranite, that cooled as basalt. The exact origin of the landform is not known: it might have been part of an older volcanic complex, or it might have never penetrated the surface but cooled underground and then became exposed as the somewhat softer granite around it was eroded over time. According to Argon dating techniques, the basalt of Malapai Hill is 15.93 ± 0.08 million years old.

There are two summits, with the true summit rising on the north. The volcanic features include piles of monzogranite and basalt talus on the mountain's steep slopes.

The hill is composed of aphanitic alkaline olivine basalt, with phenocrysts of olivine. Xenoliths of lherzolite are abundant and more rarely of White Tank monzogranite. The lherzolite nodules are interpreted as representing depleted mantle from the area of partial melting that produced the magma.

On February 26, 2015, a magnitude 3.7 earthquake struck underneath Malapai Hill.

== Etymology ==
Malapai is an Americanization of the Spanish word malpaís, which can be translated as bad terrain. The term malpaís is widely used to refer to badlands characterized by eroded rocks of volcanic origin. The cactus and xeric scrub plant community surrounding the mountain is characteristic of the stark and dry desert here.

== Recreation ==
While there are not maintained trails in the area, the peak, which is in Joshua Tree Wilderness, is listed by the Angles Chapter of the Sierra Club as a recommended outing. Magnetite formations near the summit are known to disrupt magnetic compasses.
