= Chowchilla River =

- Location of the mouth of the Chowchilla River in California

Location
- Country: United States
- State: California
- Counties: Merced, Madera, Mariposa

Physical characteristics
- Source: Sierra Nevada Range
  - location: confluence of the East Fork and West Fork of the Chowchilla River, Mariposa, California
  - coordinates: 37°19′40″N 119°49′51″W
- Mouth: San Joaquin River
  - location: On border of Merced County and Madera County, California
  - coordinates: 37°6′21″N 120°30′38″W
  - elevation: 131 ft (40 m)
- Length: 54.2 mi (87.2 km)
- Basin size: 254 sq mi (660 km^{2})
- Discharge
  - location: below Buchanan Dam
  - average: 99.8 cu ft/s (2.83 m^{3}/s)
  - minimum: 0 cu ft/s (0 m^{3}/s)
  - maximum: 30,000 cu ft/s (850 m^{3}/s)

The Chowchilla River is a river in central California, United States and a minor tributary of the San Joaquin River. It flows for 54.2 miles (87.2 km) from the western side of the Sierra Nevada Range to the San Joaquin River system in the San Joaquin Valley.

Most of the lower half of the river forms the border between Merced and Madera County.

== Course ==
The river begins as three separate forks in southern Mariposa County.

=== West Fork ===
The West Fork (officially known as West Fork Chowchilla River) is formed by the confluence of Jones Creek and Snow Creek, north of the town of Bootjack, California. It flows roughly south from Bootjack, receiving Pegleg Creek, Humbug Creek, Italian Creek and Blade Creek before converging with the Middle Fork.

=== Middle Fork ===
The Middle Fork (officially known as Middle Fork Chowchilla River) is formed by the confluence of Magoon Creek and Fox Creek, on the east side of Magoon Hill in the Sierra Nevada. It flows roughly south along the west side of Stumpfield Mountain, receiving a few unnamed tributaries, before converging with the West Fork.

=== East Fork ===
The East Fork (officially known as East Fork Chowchilla River) is the longest of the three forks and is formed by the confluence of several small, unnamed streams on the south side of Chowchilla Mountain, in the Sierra National Forest. It flows roughly south past the locality of Harris Ranch, receiving Oliver Creek and several other small, unnamed tributaries along the way. It converges with the West Fork south of Bailey Flats, and a few miles south of where the Middle and West Forks converge.

=== Main river ===
The Chowchilla River begins in name at the point where the West and East forks converge and flows southwest to Eastman Lake. The lake, which holds 150,000 acre⋅ft (190,000 dam^{3}) of water from the Chowchilla, was created in 1975 by the construction of Buchanan Dam, an earth and rockfill structure which is 205 by 1,800 ft (62 by 549 m). The lake and dam's primary purpose is flood control and irrigation. In the summer months, Eastman Lake is a popular boating, fishing, camping and hiking destination for residents of the Madera and Chowchilla areas.

Below Eastman Lake, the river continues roughly west, past the City of Chowchilla, to the San Joaquin River System.

== Lower river ==
Seven miles downstream of Eastman Lake, the Chowchilla's water is diverted into both the Berenda and Ash sloughs, with excess water continuing down the main river channel. The river flows west-southwest for most of the rest of the journey before flowing west in the last few miles. The last 2 mi (3.2 km) of the river doubles as an irrigation canal for farms located along its banks.

The main river channel ends abruptly about 3 mi (4.8 km) east of the San Joaquin River. The river has never had a defined natural outlet to the San Joaquin, as evidenced by the fact that the riverbed shrinks considerably in size as it travels west. A natural outlet never existed because the river only has a seasonal flow, and natural water flow would normally dry up before it had a chance to reach the San Joaquin. In rare years of torrential rains, there would still be water in the river at the end of the riverbed, at which point the water would simply flood the area past the end of the riverbed. Those floodwaters would eventually find their way into the San Joaquin River.

As part of the Lower San Joaquin River Flood Control Project, a diversion canal was built to connect the end of the riverbed with the Eastside Bypass, allowing the Chowchilla's water a controlled outlet to the San Joaquin River during years of heavy rains.

The Chowchilla River serves at the outlet of the Madera Canal.

== Tributaries ==
In addition to many small unnamed streams, the Chowchilla River receives the water from the following streams:

- Rock Creek
- Willow Creek
- Split Rock Creek
- Cow Creek

== Towns ==
Towns along the Chowchilla River include:

- Harris Ranch (Unincorporated)
- Bootjack (Unincorporated)
- Raymond (Unincorporated)
- Chowchilla

== Crossings ==
There are numerous crossings over the Chowchilla River in Madera and Merced Counties. Crossings are listed here beginning at the source and working downstream:

- Madera County above Eastman Lake
  - Bailey Flats Road
  - Green Mountain Road
- Madera County below Eastman Lake
  - Eastman Lake Park Access Road
  - Santa Fe Drive
  - Santa Fe Railroad next to Santa Fe Drive crossing
  - Road 19
  - Road 15
  - State Route 99
  - Road 13
  - Avenue 26
  - Road 11
  - Hemlock Road
  - Road 8
  - Avenue 25
  - Road 5½
  - Road 5
- Merced County
  - South Orchard Way
  - State Route 59

== See also ==
- List of rivers of California
