= Cady Mountains =

American mountain in California

- Location within California

Highest point
- Elevation: 1,072 m (3,517 ft)

Geography
- Country: United States
- State: California
- Region: Mojave Desert
- District: San Bernardino County
- Range coordinates: 34°55′21.949″N 116°24′59.083″W
- Topo map: USGS Hidden Valley West

The Cady Mountains are a mountain range in the Mojave Desert and within Mojave Trails National Monument, in San Bernardino County, California.

They are located between Interstate 15 and Interstate 40, just east of Newberry Springs. The range lies to the west of the Bristol Mountains, and reach an elevation of 3,980 feet (1,210 m) above sea level at "Sleeping Beauty", at the southern end of the range.

The Pisgah Crater is found south of the Cady Mountains, on the south side of Interstate 40.

== Additional sources ==
- Allan, Stuart (2005). California Road and Recreation Atlas. Benchmark Maps. p. 105. ISBN 0-929591-80-1.
