= Bullion Mountains =

Mountain range in California, United States

- Location within California

Highest point
- Elevation: 815 m (2,674 ft)

Geography
- Country: United States
- State: California
- Region: Mojave Desert
- District: San Bernardino County
- Range coordinates: 34°22′45.988″N 115°56′26.003″W
- Topo map: USGS Lead Mountain

The Bullion Mountains are located in the Mojave Desert of California southeast of the city of Barstow. The mountain range stretches for approximately 50 miles in a northwest-southeasterly direction north of Joshua Tree and Twentynine Palms.

Since most of the range lies in the Marine Corps Air Ground Combat Center Twentynine Palms, where live ammunition practices occur, almost the entire mountain range is off-limits to the public. The highest point of the range in the northwestern region is 4,669 feet (1,423) meters.
