= Cottonwood Mountains (Riverside County) =

Mountain range in Riverside County, California

- Location within California

Highest point
- Elevation: 1,045 m (3,428 ft)

Geography
- Country: United States
- State: California
- District: Riverside County
- Range coordinates: 33°42′46.068″N 115°54′26.986″W
- Topo map: USGS Cottonwood Basin

The Cottonwood Mountains are a mountain range in Riverside County, California. They lie between the Little San Bernardino Mountains to the west, and Eagle Mountains to the east and the Hexie Mountains to the north. They are partially included in the Joshua Tree Wilderness.
