= Joshua Tree National Park =

National park in California, United States

- IUCN category II (national park)
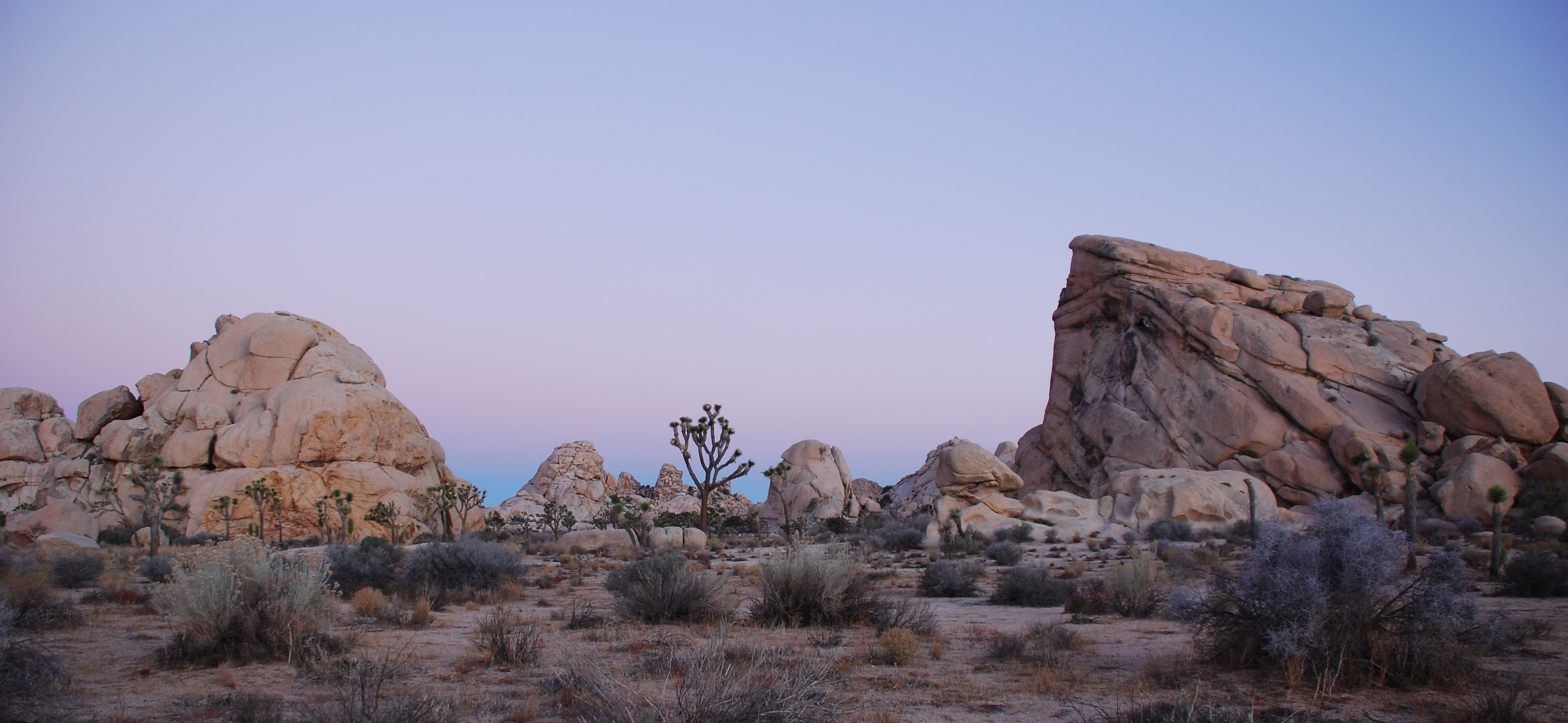
- Cyclops and Pee Wee Formations near Hidden Valley Campground at dawn
- Interactive map of Joshua Tree National Park
- Location: Riverside County and San Bernardino County, California, United States
- Nearest city: Twentynine Palms
- Coordinates: 34.1°N 116.27°W
- Area: 795,156 acres (1,242.4 sq mi; 3,217.9 km^{2})
- Established: August 10, 1936; 90 years ago as a national monument October 31, 1994; 31 years ago as a national park
- Visitors: 3,058,294 (in 2022)
- Governing body: National Park Service
- Website: www.nps.gov/jotr/index.htm

Joshua Tree National Park is a US national park located in southeastern California, straddling north-central Riverside County and part of southern San Bernardino County. Named after the endemic Joshua tree (Yucca brevifolia), found in the park and surrounding areas, Joshua Tree is situated some 130 miles (211 km) east of the city of Los Angeles and roughly 78 mi (125 km) east of the city of San Bernardino. Among some of the closest cities to the park are Indio, Palm Desert, and Palm Springs. Originally declared a national monument in 1936, Joshua Tree was redesignated as a national park in 1994 when the U.S. Congress passed the California Desert Protection Act.

Encompassing a total area of 795,156 acres (1,242.4 sq mi; 3,217.9 km^{2})—slightly larger than the state of Rhode Island—the park features 429,690 acres (671.4 sq mi; 1,738.9 km^{2}) of designated wilderness. The park encompasses portions of two deserts, each a unique ecosystem with characteristics determined primarily by elevation—the higher Mojave Desert and the lower-lying Colorado Desert. The Little San Bernardino Mountains line the park's southwest edge.

== History ==
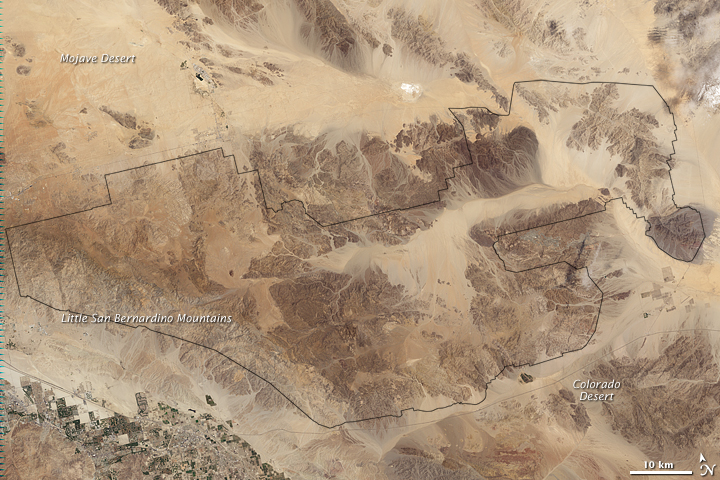
The park on a 2003 Landsat image

=== Early ===
The earliest known residents of the land in and around what later became Joshua Tree National Park were the people of the Pinto Culture, who lived and hunted here between 8000 and 4000 BCE. Their stone tools and spear points, discovered in the Pinto Basin in the 1930s, suggest that they hunted game and gathered seasonal plants, but little else is known about them. Later residents included the Serrano, the Cahuilla, and the Chemehuevi peoples. All three lived in small villages in or near water, particularly the Oasis of Mara in what non-aboriginals later called Twentynine Palms. They subsisted largely on plant foods supplemented by small game, amphibians, and reptiles while using other plants for making medicines, bows, arrows, baskets, and other articles of daily life.

A fourth group, the Mojaves, used the local resources as they traveled along trails between the Colorado River and the Pacific coast. In the 21st century, small numbers of all four peoples live in the region near the park; the Twentynine Palms Band of Mission Indians, descendants of the Chemehuevi, own a reservation in Twentynine Palms.

In 1772, a group of Spaniards led by Pedro Fages made the first European sightings of Joshua trees while pursuing native converts to Christianity who had run away from a mission in San Diego. By 1823, the year Mexico achieved independence from Spain, a Mexican expedition from Los Angeles, in what was then Alta California, is thought to have explored as far east as the Eagle Mountains in what later became the park. Three years later, Jedediah Smith led a group of American fur trappers and explorers along the nearby Mojave Trail, and others soon followed. Two decades after that, the United States defeated Mexico in the Mexican–American War (1846–48) and took over about half of Mexico's original territory, including California and the future parkland.

=== Post-1870 ===
In 1870, white settlers began grazing cattle on the tall grasses that grew in the park. In 1888, a gang of cattle rustlers moved into the region near the Oasis of Mara. Led by brothers James B. and William S. McHaney, they hid stolen cattle in a box canyon at Cow Camp. Throughout the region, ranchers dug wells and built rainwater catchments called "tanks", such as White Tank and Barker Dam.

In 1900, C. O. Barker, a miner and cattleman, built the original Barker Dam, later improved by William "Bill" Keys, a rancher. Grazing continued in the park through 1945. Barker Dam was added to the National Register of Historic Places (NRHP) in 1975.

Between the 1860s and the 1940s, miners worked about 300 pit mines, mostly small, in what later became the park. The most successful, the Lost Horse Mine, produced gold and silver worth about $5 million in today's currency. Johnny Lang and others, the original owners of the Lost Horse Mine, installed a two-stamp mill to process ore at the site, and the next owner, J.D. Ryan, replaced it with a 10-stamp steam-powered mill. Ryan pumped water from his ranch to the mill and cut timber from the nearby hills to heat water to make steam. Most of the structures associated with the mine fell apart, and for safety reasons, the National Park Service plugged the mine, which had collapsed.

The Desert Queen Mine on Keys' Desert Queen Ranch was another productive gold mine. In the early 1930s, Keys bought a gasoline-powered two-stamp mill, the Wall Street Mill, and moved it to his ranch to process ore. The ranch and mill were added to the NRHP in 1975 and the mine in 1976. Some of the mines in the park yielded copper, zinc, and iron.

=== Protection ===
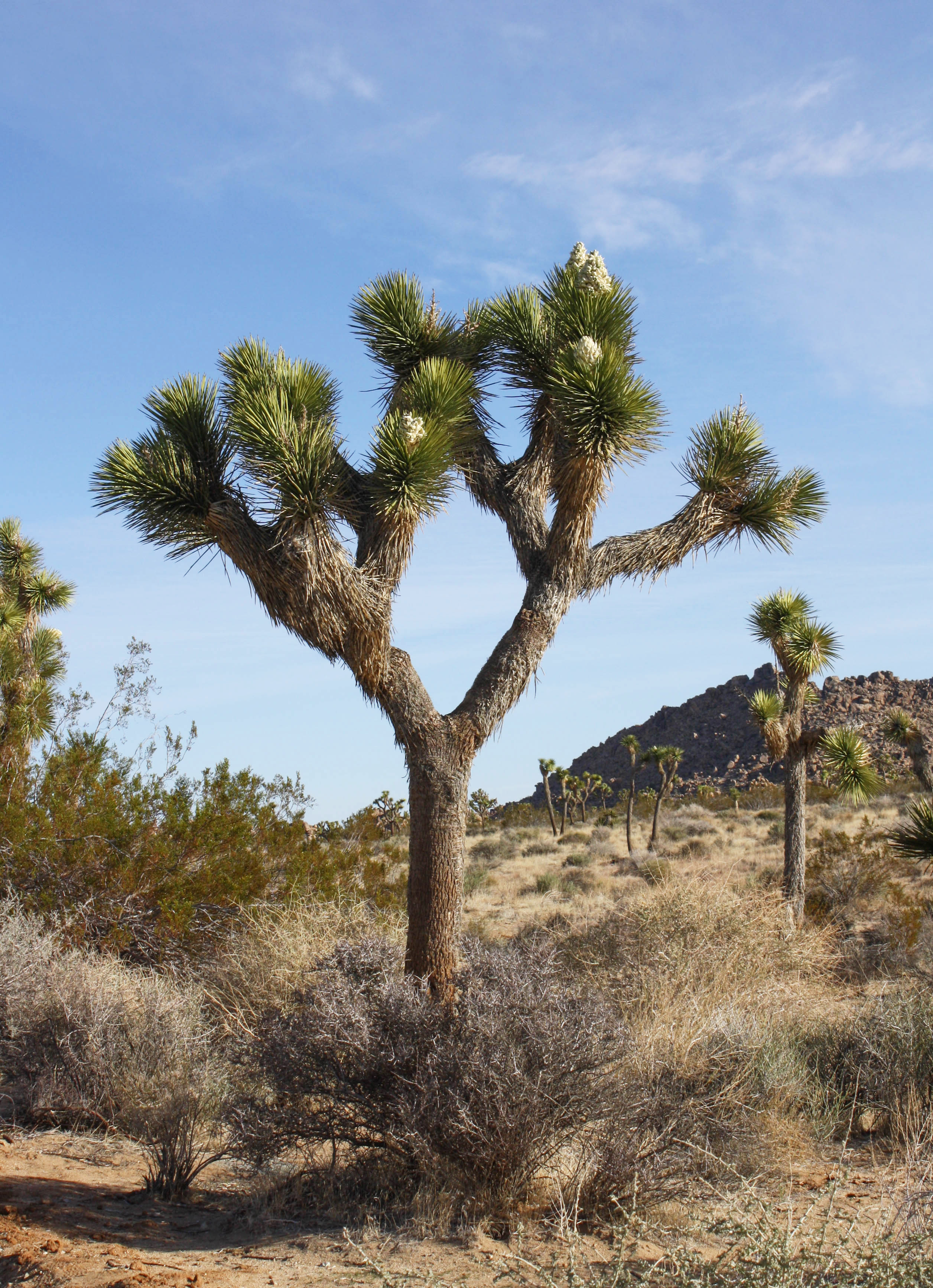
A namesake Joshua tree at Joshua Tree National Park

On August 10, 1936, after Minerva Hoyt and others persuaded the state and federal governments to protect the area, President Franklin D. Roosevelt used the power of the 1906 Antiquities Act to establish Joshua Tree National Monument, protecting about 825,000 acres (1,289.1 sq mi; 3,338.7 km^{2}). In 1950, the size of the park was reduced by about 290,000 acres (453.1 sq mi; 1,173.6 km^{2}) to open the land to more mining. The monument was redesignated as a national park on October 31, 1994, by the Desert Protection Act, which also added 234,000 acres (365.6 sq mi; 947.0 km^{2}). In 2019, the park expanded by 4,518 acres (7.1 sq mi; 18.3 km^{2}) under a provision included in the John D. Dingell Jr. Conservation, Management, and Recreation Act.

The Mojave Desert Land Trust (MDLT) has conserved 10,290 acres (4,160 ha) within the park. These holdings were privately owned within the national park, which they were able to purchase. They also acquire private properties bordering federally protected properties. MDLT has sold 25,801 acres (10,441 ha) of acquired private property to the National Park Service, which is more than any other similar organization.

== Geography ==
=== Potential natural vegetation ===
According to the A. W. Kuchler U.S. Potential natural vegetation types, Joshua Tree National Park has two categories, a creosote bush potential vegetation type with a desert shrubland potential vegetation form in most of the area, and a juniper/pinyon pine potential vegetation type with a Great Basin montane forest/southwest forest potential vegetation form on the higher elevations of the western side of the park.

=== Mojave Desert ===
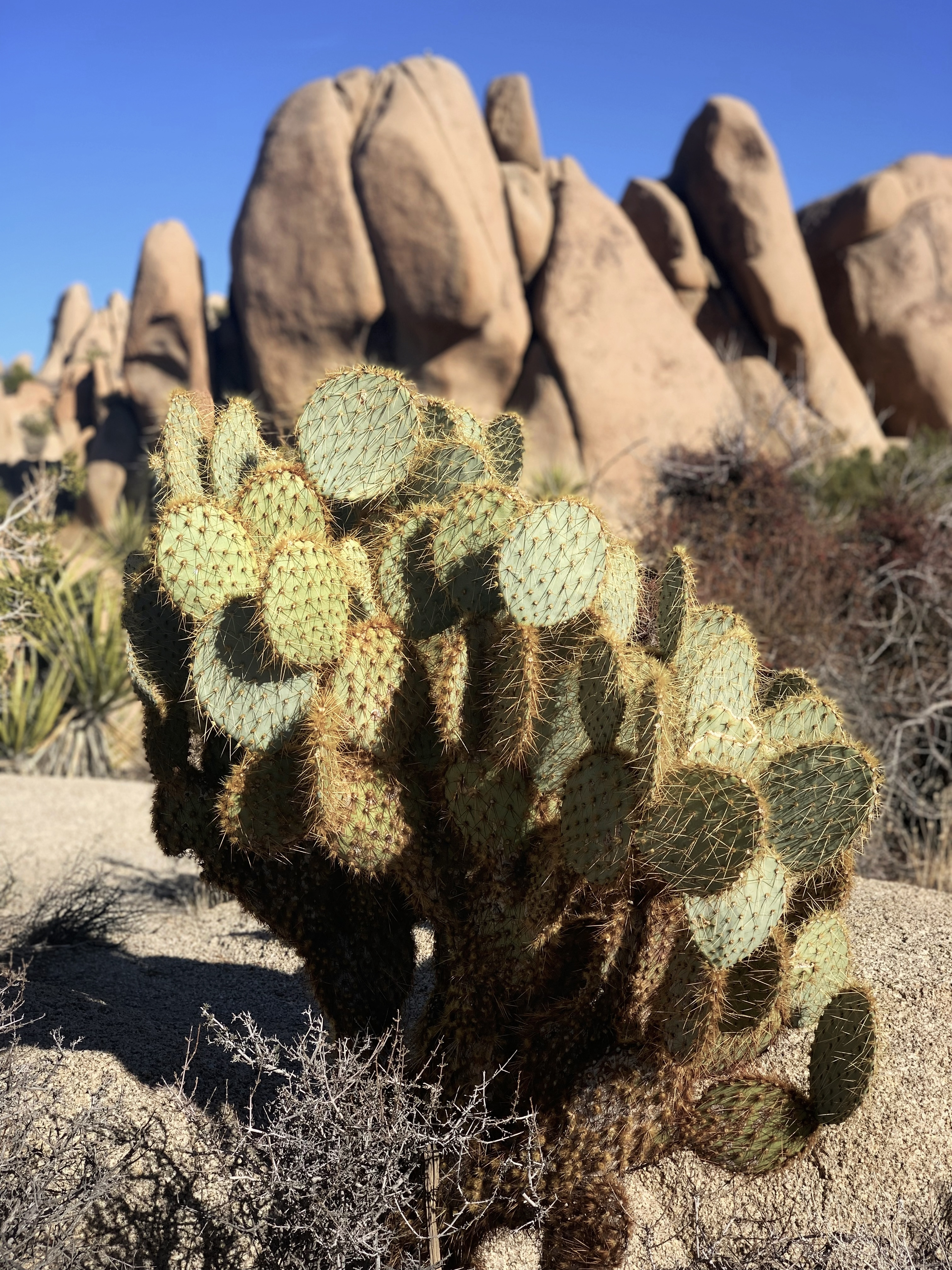
Dollarjoint pricklypear near Skull Rock in Joshua Tree

The higher and cooler Mojave Desert is the special habitat of Yucca brevifolia, the Joshua tree for which the park is named. It occurs in patterns from dense forests to distantly spaced specimens. In addition to Joshua tree forests, the western part of the park includes some of the most interesting geologic displays found in California's deserts. The dominant geologic features of this landscape are hills of bare rock, usually broken up into loose boulders. These hills are popular among rock climbing and scrambling enthusiasts. The flatland between these hills is sparsely forested with Joshua trees. Together with the boulder piles and Skull Rock, the trees make the landscape otherworldly. Temperatures are most comfortable in the spring and fall, with an average high/low of 85 and 50 °F (29 and 10 °C), respectively. Winter brings cooler days, around 60 °F (16 °C), and freezing nights. Snows occur occasionally at higher elevations. Summers are hot, over 100 °F (38 °C) during the day and not cooling much below 75 °F (24 °C) until the early hours of the morning.

Joshua trees dominate the open spaces of the park, but in among the rock outcroppings are piñon pine, California juniper (Juniperus californica), Quercus turbinella (desert scrub oak), Quercus john-tuckeri (Tucker's oak), Quercus cornelius-mulleri (Muller's oak), Cylindropuntia chuckwallensis (chuckwalla cholla), and Opuntia chlorotica (dollarjoint pricklypear).

These communities are under some stress, however, as the climate was wetter until the 1930s, with the same hot and dry conditions that provoked the Dust Bowl affecting the local climate. These cycles were nothing new, but the original vegetation did not prosper when wetter cycles returned. The difference may have been human development. Cattle grazing took out some of the natural cover and made it less resistant to the changes.

Fewer Joshua tree seedlings are surviving in the park. It is forecasted that by 2099, under the high emission scenario, the park will increase in temperature by 8 °F. This would make most of the national park unsuitable for Joshua tree growth. Under the low emission scenario, 80% of suitable Joshua tree habitat could be lost.

The desert tortoise population has decreased due to habitat loss and climate change. Lizards in the park are also at risk. Bird species have declined 43% according to studies conducted in 1908–1968 and 2013–2016.

=== Colorado Desert ===
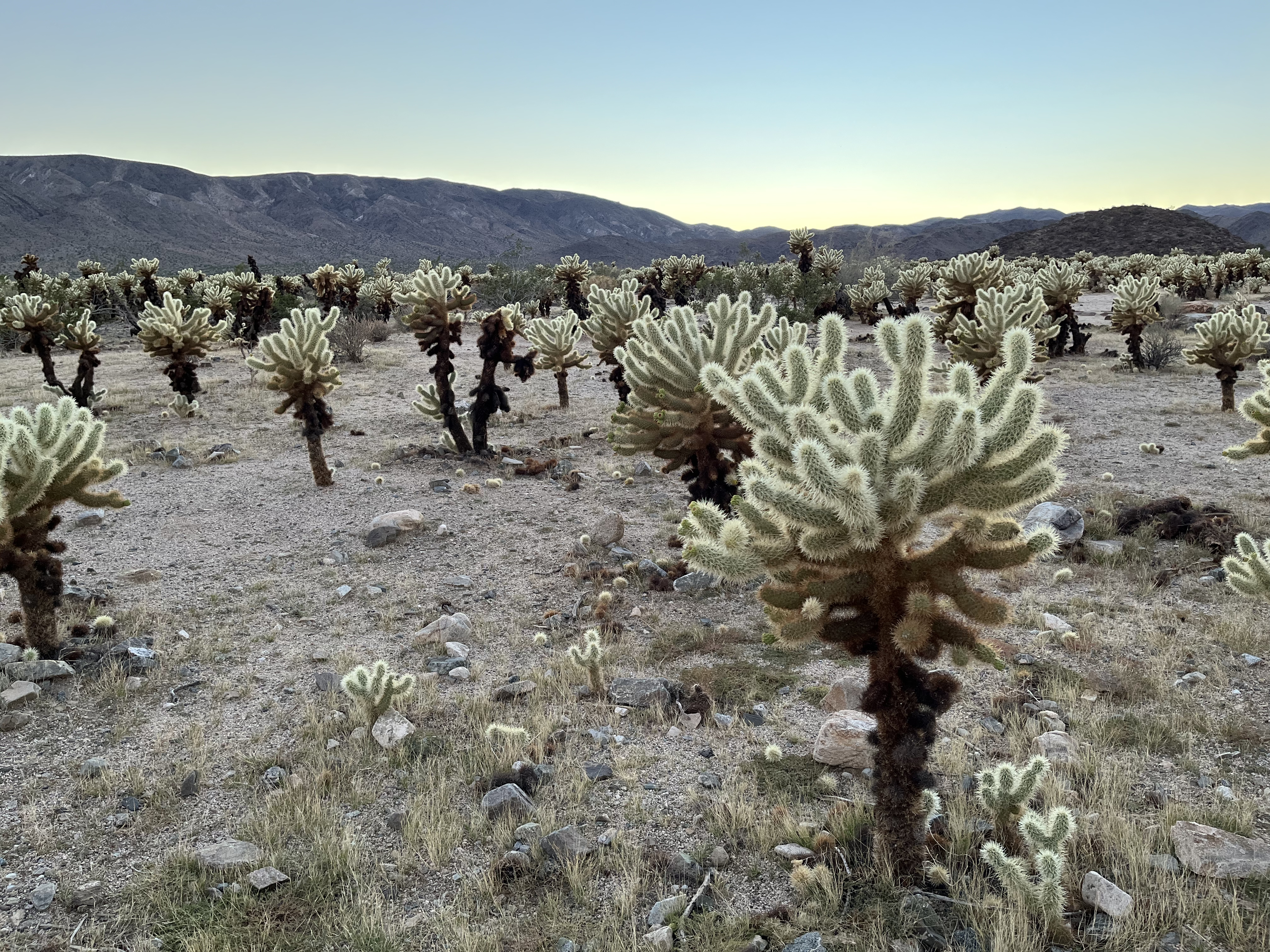
Cholla Cactus Garden in 2022

Below 3,000 feet (910 m), the Colorado Desert encompasses the eastern part of the park and features habitats of creosote bush scrub, ocotillo, desert saltbush, and mixed scrub including yucca and cholla cactus (Cylindropuntia bigelovii). Some areas of such cactus are dense enough to appear as natural gardens. The lower Coachella Valley is on the southeastern side of the park with sandy soil grasslands and desert dunes.

The only palm native to California, the California fan palm (Washingtonia filifera), occurs naturally in five oases in the park, rare areas where water occurs naturally year-round, and all forms of wildlife abound.

=== Invasive species ===
Invasive plants such as cheat grass and red brome contribute to the worsening of wildfires. During wetter periods they fill in below and among the pines and oak. In drier times, they die back but do not quickly decompose. This makes wildfires hotter and more destructive, which kills some of the trees that would have otherwise survived. When the area regenerates, these non-native grasses form a thick layer of turf that makes getting a foothold harder for the pine and oak seedlings.

Fountain grass was introduced to the park in the 1990s. This grass competes with native grasses for water and nutrients.

=== Climate ===
According to the Köppen climate classification system, Joshua Tree National Park has a hot desert climate (BWh). According to the United States Department of Agriculture, the plant hardiness zone at the Cottonwood Visitor Center at 3081 ft (939 m) elevation is 8b, with an average annual extreme minimum temperature of 19.8 °F (−6.8 °C).

Climate data for Cottonwood Visitor Center, Joshua Tree National Park. Elev: 3104 ft (946 m)
Month	Jan	Feb	Mar	Apr	May	Jun	Jul	Aug	Sep	Oct	Nov	Dec	Year
Mean daily maximum °F (°C)	59.2 (15.1)	61.1 (16.2)	66.4 (19.1)	75.3 (24.1)	84.3 (29.1)	92.8 (33.8)	97.7 (36.5)	96.7 (35.9)	91.3 (32.9)	80.0 (26.7)	67.2 (19.6)	58.6 (14.8)	77.6 (25.3)
Daily mean °F (°C)	47.2 (8.4)	48.9 (9.4)	53.3 (11.8)	59.9 (15.5)	68.2 (20.1)	76.4 (24.7)	82.4 (28.0)	81.7 (27.6)	75.7 (24.3)	64.7 (18.2)	53.7 (12.1)	46.5 (8.1)	63.3 (17.4)
Mean daily minimum °F (°C)	35.1 (1.7)	36.7 (2.6)	40.3 (4.6)	44.6 (7.0)	52.1 (11.2)	60.0 (15.6)	67.0 (19.4)	66.8 (19.3)	60.1 (15.6)	49.4 (9.7)	40.1 (4.5)	34.5 (1.4)	49.0 (9.4)
Average precipitation inches (mm)	0.88 (22)	0.84 (21)	0.66 (17)	0.19 (4.8)	0.07 (1.8)	0.01 (0.25)	0.32 (8.1)	0.82 (21)	0.26 (6.6)	0.30 (7.6)	0.32 (8.1)	0.78 (20)	5.45 (138)
Average relative humidity (%)	40.7	43.0	42.9	37.4	35.1	26.2	28.6	31.0	30.1	31.4	34.6	37.9	34.9
Average dew point °F (°C)	24.5 (−4.2)	27.4 (−2.6)	31.3 (−0.4)	33.8 (1.0)	39.6 (4.2)	39.2 (4.0)	46.6 (8.1)	48.1 (8.9)	42.2 (5.7)	33.7 (0.9)	26.4 (−3.1)	22.2 (−5.4)	34.6 (1.4)
Source: PRISM Climate Group

Joshua Tree is becoming hotter and drier due to climate change. From 1895 to 2016, the annual precipitation has dropped by 39% and the annual temperature has increased by 3 °F. Because of the hotter and drier conditions, there are more wildfires in the park.

== Geology ==
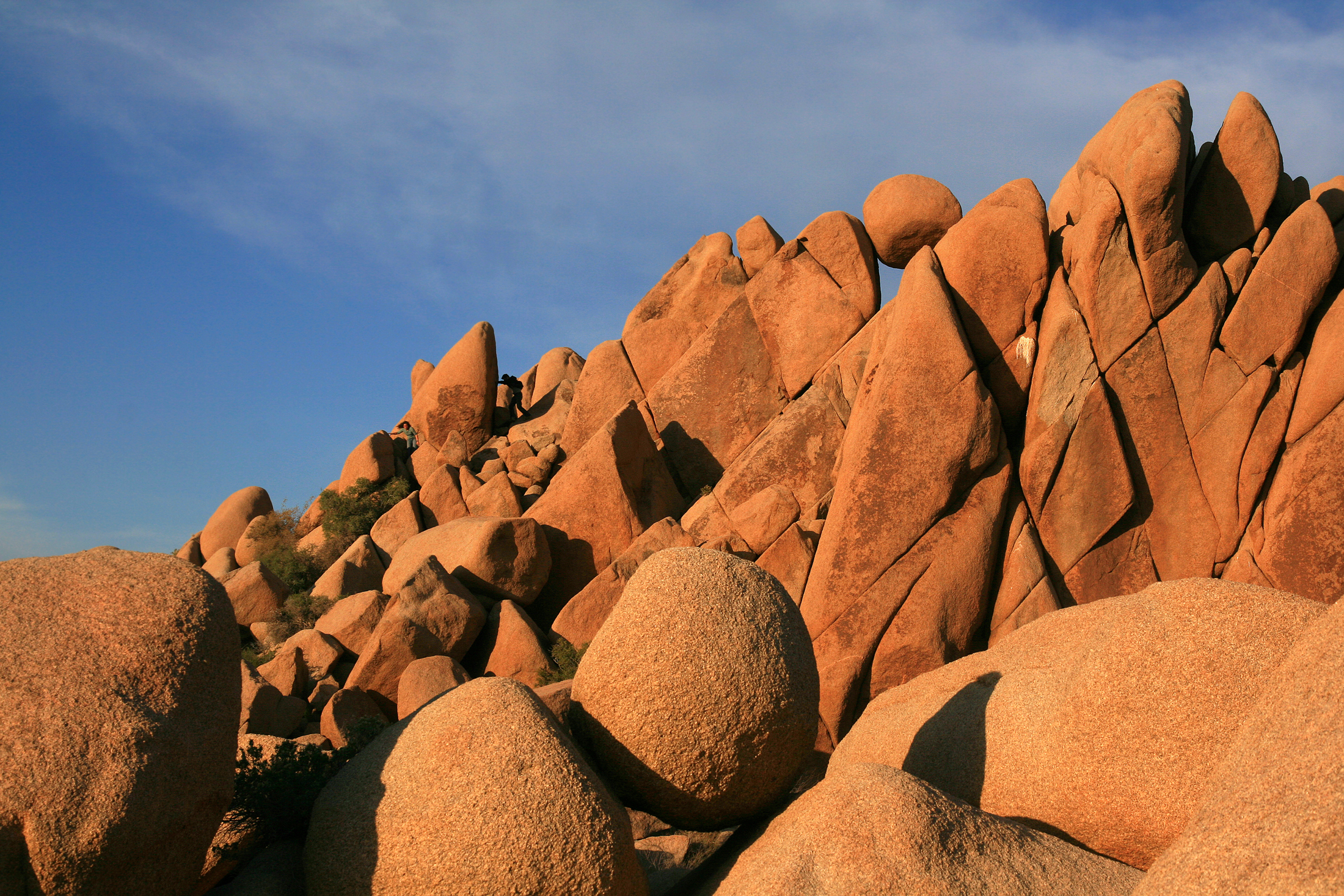
Giant Marbles

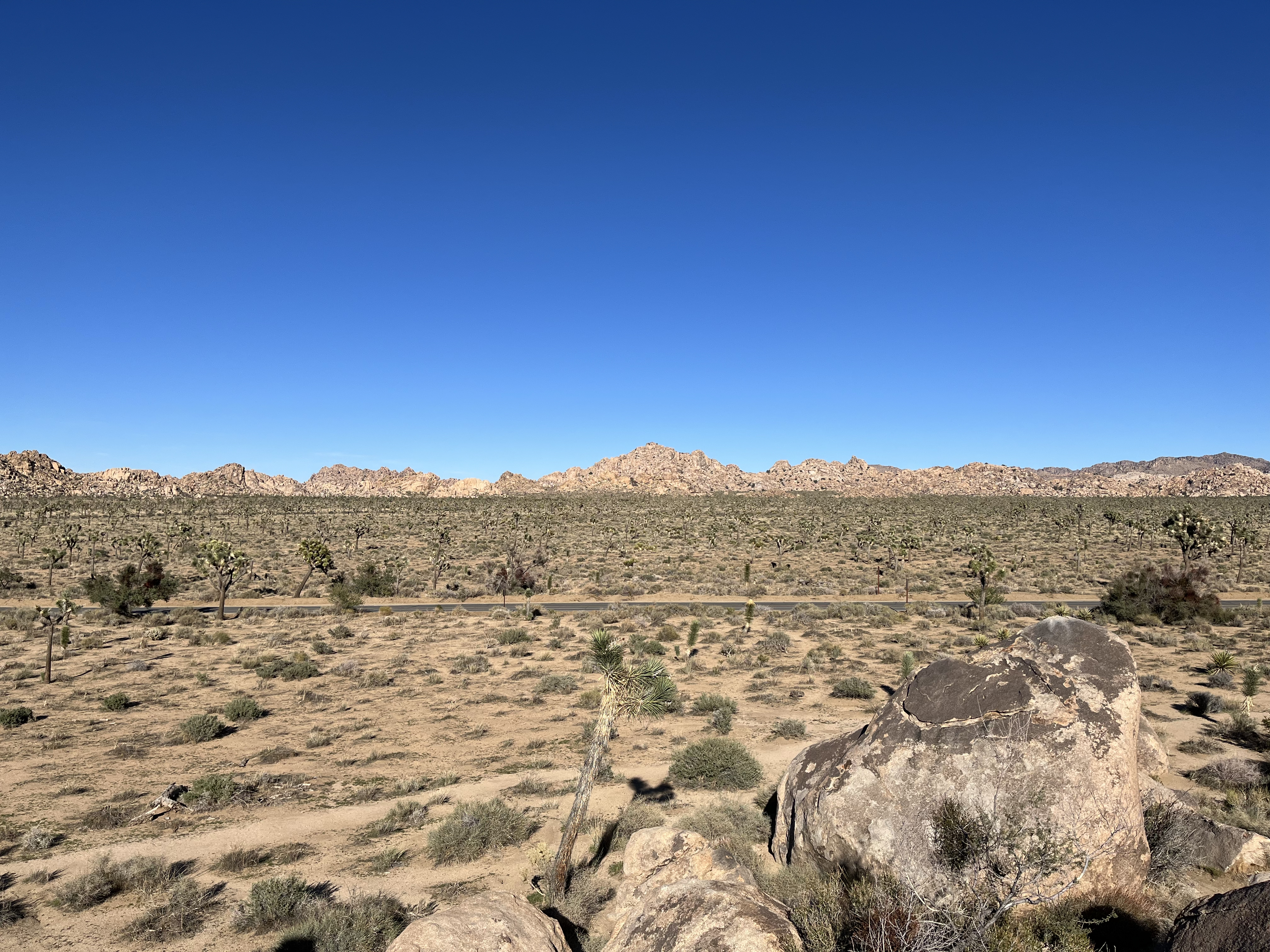
View from Quail Springs Picnic Area in 2022

The park's oldest rocks, Pinto Gneiss among them, are 1.7 billion years old. They are exposed in places on the park's surface in the Cottonwood, Pinto, and Eagle Mountains. Much later, between 250 and 75 million years ago, tectonic plate movements forced volcanic material toward the surface in the region, forming granites, including monzogranite common to the Wonderland of Rocks, parts of the Pinto, Eagle, and Coxcomb Mountains, and elsewhere. Erosion eventually exposed the harder rocks, gneiss and granite, in the uplands as less resistant rocks were reduced to debris that filled the canyons and basins between the ranges. That erosional debris, moved by gravity and water, formed alluvial fans at the mouths of canyons, and bajadas, where the alluvial fans overlapped.

The rock formations of Joshua Tree National Park were shaped partly by groundwater, which filtered through the roughly rectangular joints of the monzonite and eroded the corners and edges of blocks of stone, and by flash floods, which washed away erosional debris, exposing the dramatic rounded formations of granitic bedrock. These prominent outcrops are known as inselbergs.

Of the park's six blocks of mountains, five—the Little San Bernardino, Hexie, Pinto, Cottonwood, and Eagle—are among the Transverse Ranges, which trend generally east–west in locations between the Eagle Mountains on the east and the northern Channel Islands, in the Pacific Ocean west of Santa Barbara, on the west. Tectonic forces along the San Andreas Fault system compressed and lifted the crust material that formed these ranges. The San Andreas Fault itself passes southwest of the park, but related parallel faults, including the Dillon, Blue Cut, and Pinto, run through the park, and movements along them have caused earthquakes. The easternmost range in the park, the Coxcomb Mountains, runs generally north–south and is part of the Basin and Range Province.

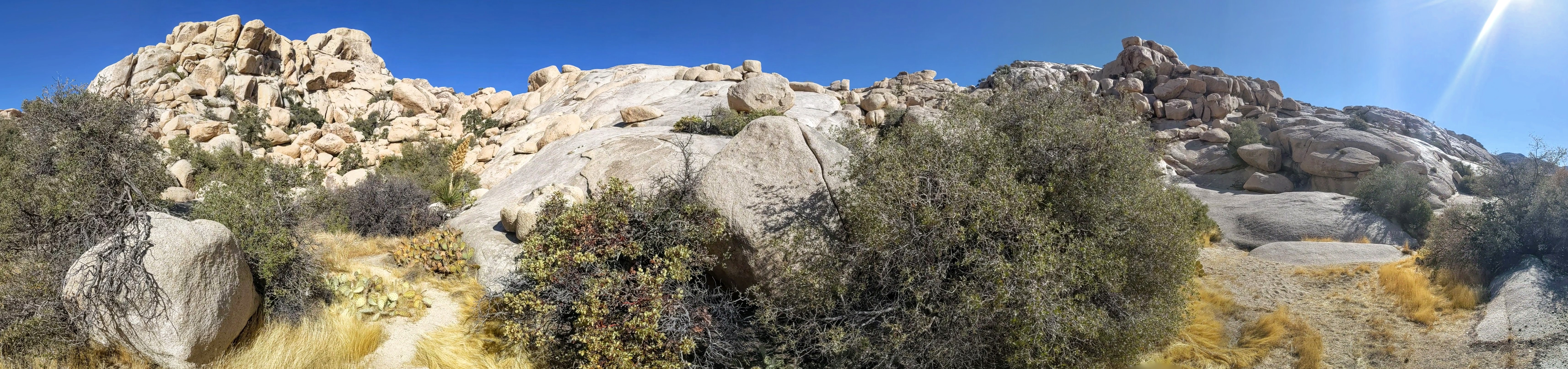
A panoramic view within the Wonderland of Rocks monzogranite area north of Barker Dam

== Recreation ==
=== Camping ===
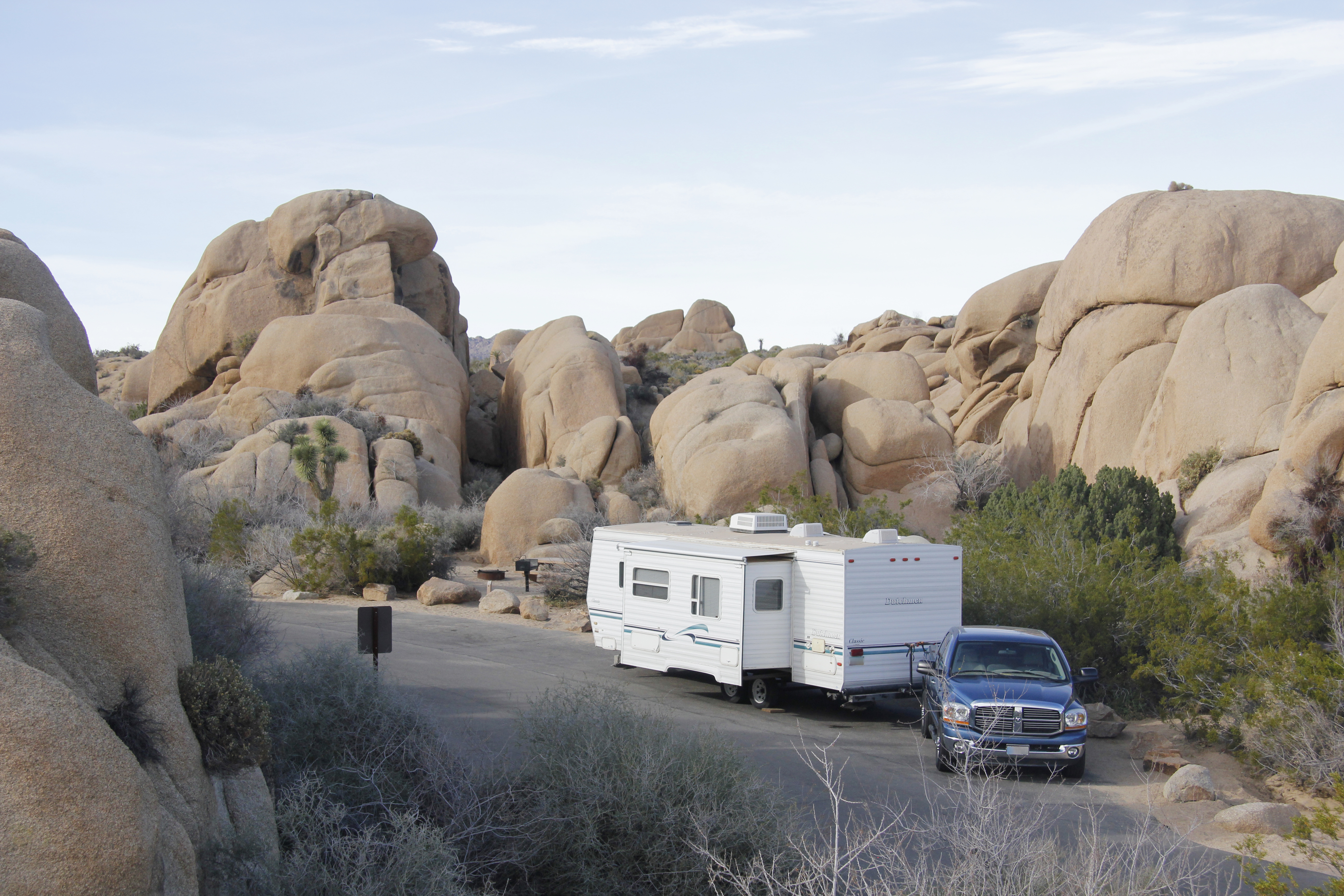
A Jumbo Rocks Campground site

There are nine established campgrounds in the park.

Several hiking trails are within the park, many of which connect to campgrounds. A section of the California Riding and Hiking Trail meanders for 35 miles (56 km) through the western side of the park. The lookout point at Keys View, towards the south of the park looks over the Coachella Valley, the Salton Sea, the San Andreas Fault, the Santa Rosa Mountains, and the city of Palm Springs.

Nature walks inside the park include:

- Hidden Valley

Longer trails include:

- Contact Mine
- Fortynine Palms Oasis
- Lost Horse Mine
- Lost Palms Oasis
- Ryan Mountain
- Ruby Lee Mill Site

Due to graffiti on at least 17 sites on trails, officials have closed them to the public. The closed sites include Native American sites, Rattlesnake Canyon, and Barker Dam. They blame the increase in vandalism on the increased use of social media.

=== Climbing ===
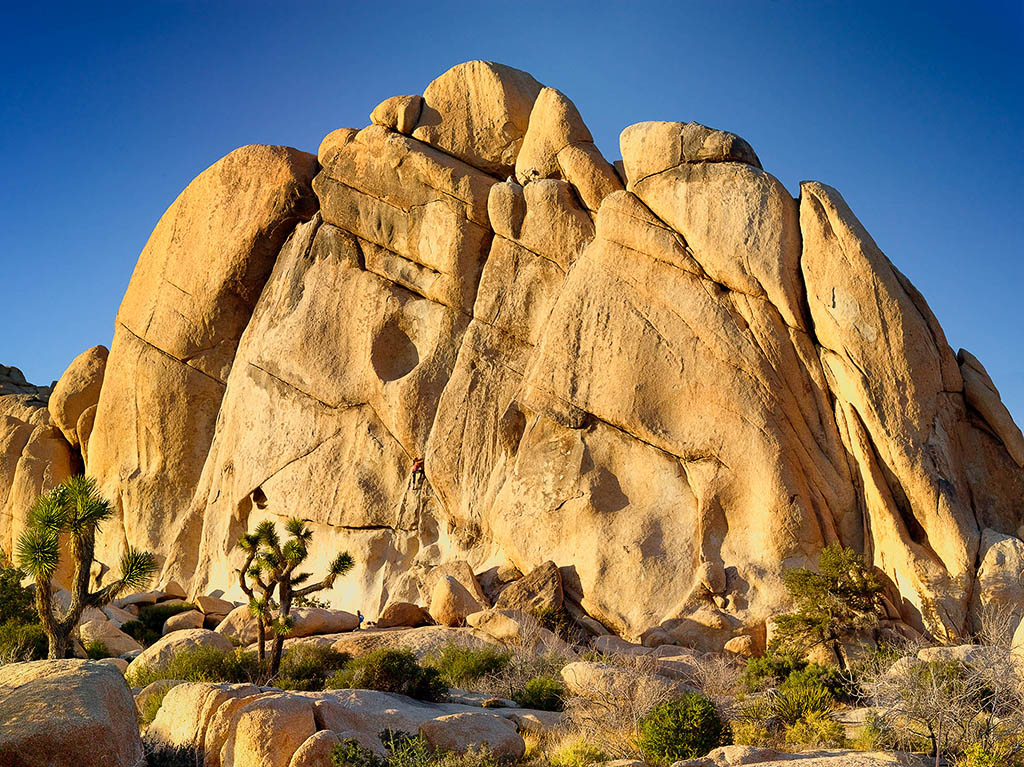
Climbing the Old Woman Rock

The park is popular with rock climbers and was originally a winter practice area while Yosemite Valley and other parts of the Sierra Nevada were snowbound, but later became an area of interest in its own right. Its thousands of named climbing routes contain all levels of difficulty. The routes are typically short, the rocks being rarely more than 230 ft (70 m) in height, but access is usually a short, easy walk through the desert, and doing several interesting climbs in a single day is possible. The rocks are all composed of quartz monzonite, a very rough type of granite, made even more so as no snow or ice polishes it, as in places such as Yosemite.

Some routes are permanently closed, while others are closed temporarily to protect sensitive wildlife in certain seasons. Climbing and bouldering routes that are permanently closed include Energy Crisis, the Schwarzenegger Wall, Zombie Woof Rock, the Maverick Boulder formation, Pictograph Boulder, Shindig, Lonely Stones Area #3, and the Shipwreck formation, Indian Wave Boulders (except for Native Arete), and Wormholes.

=== Visitation statistics ===
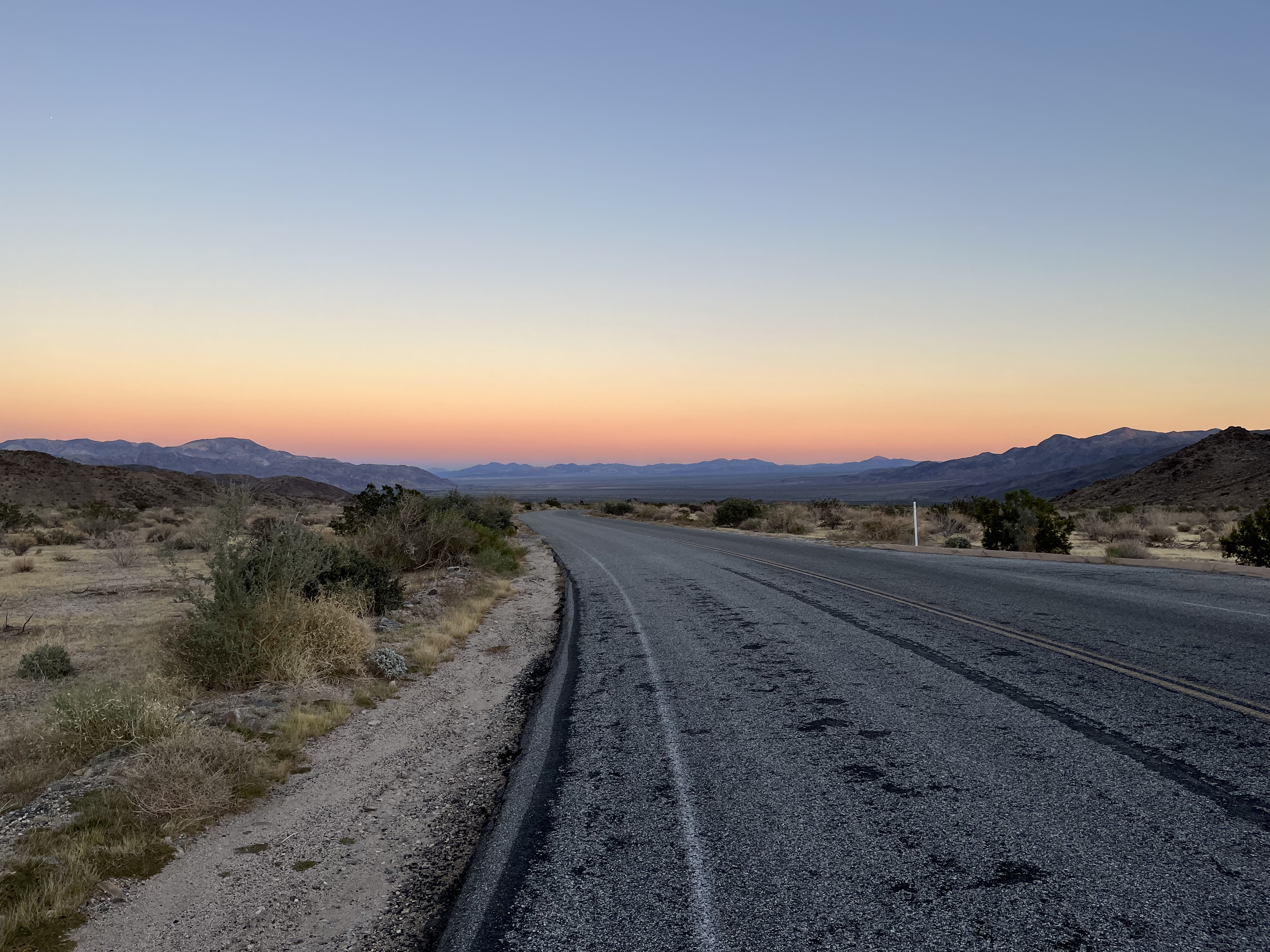
Pinto Basin Road at twilight, view towards the Colorado Desert portion of the park

The total visitors more than doubled from 2013 to 2019. Awareness of the wildflower bloom in the spring has brought increased visitation.

=== Wildlife ===
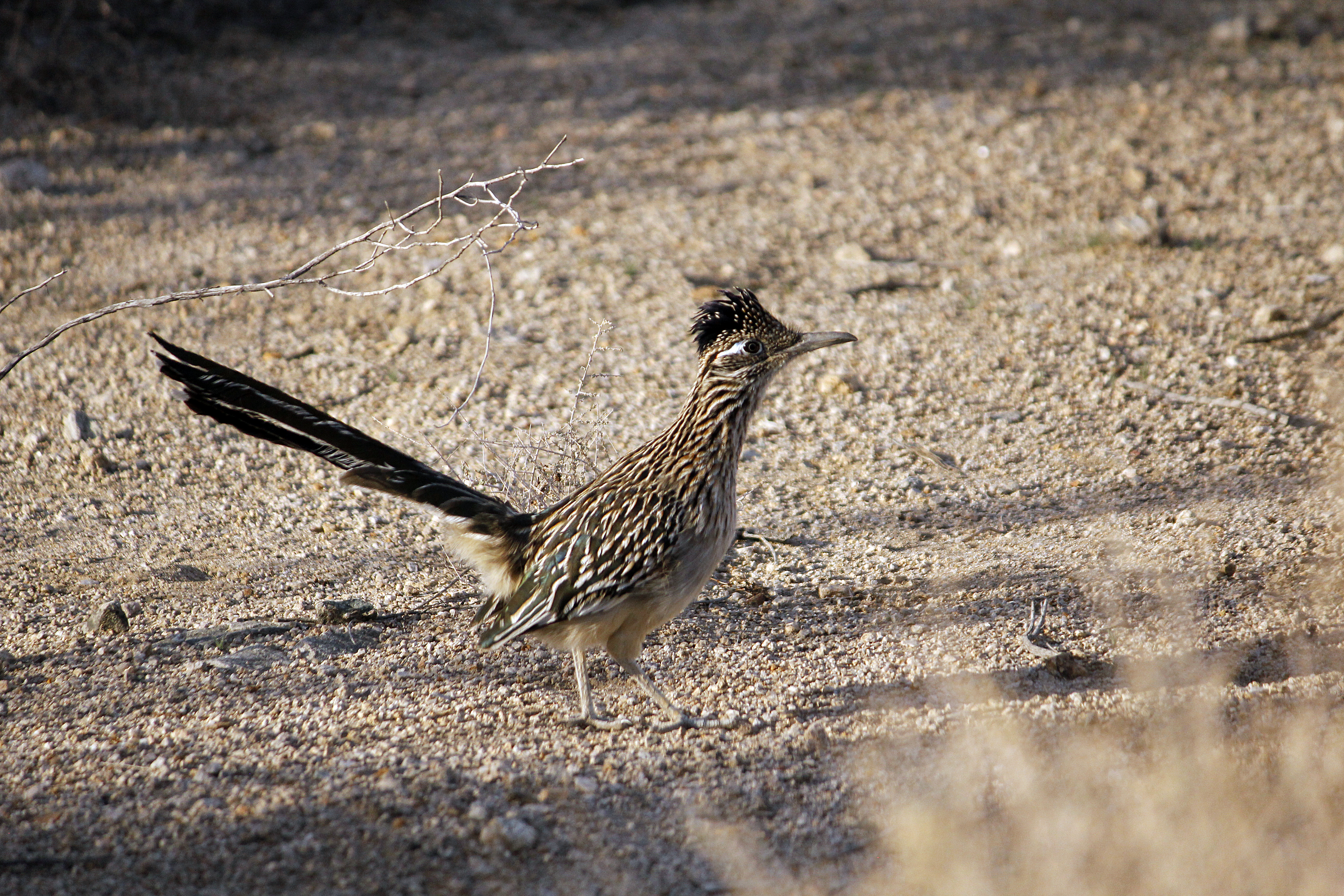
A greater roadrunner

More than 250 bird species inhabit or visit the park, including resident desert birds such as the greater roadrunner, cactus wren, northern mockingbird, LeConte's thrasher, verdin, and Gambel's quail. About 78 species nest and raise their young within the park. Many migrating species spend only a short time feeding and resting at Joshua Tree, mainly in the winter, as the park lies along an inland stretch of the Pacific Flyway. Other species descend from their usual habitats in the mountains to escape winter snow.

A USGS bird checklist from 2006 contained 239 species in the park.

=== Astronomy ===
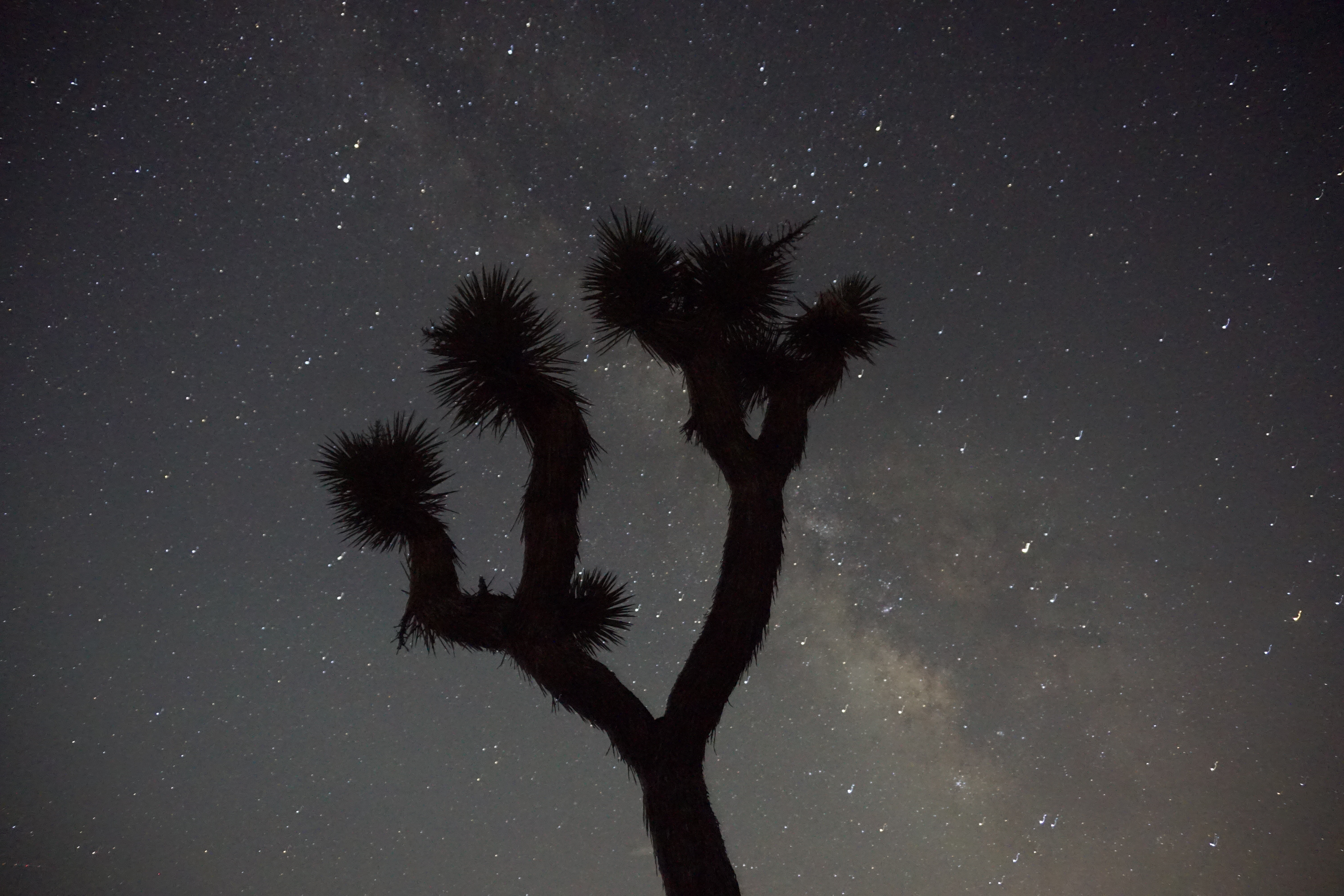
The park offers naturally dark views of the night sky, as seen in this 30-second exposure showing the Milky Way behind a silhouetted Joshua tree (July 2017)

Joshua Tree is a popular observing site in Southern California for amateur astronomy and stargazing.

The park is well known for its naturally dark night skies, which are far away from and largely free of the light pollution typical in urban areas. In 2017, the International Dark-Sky Association designated Joshua Tree a Dark Sky Park.

== Fauna and flora ==
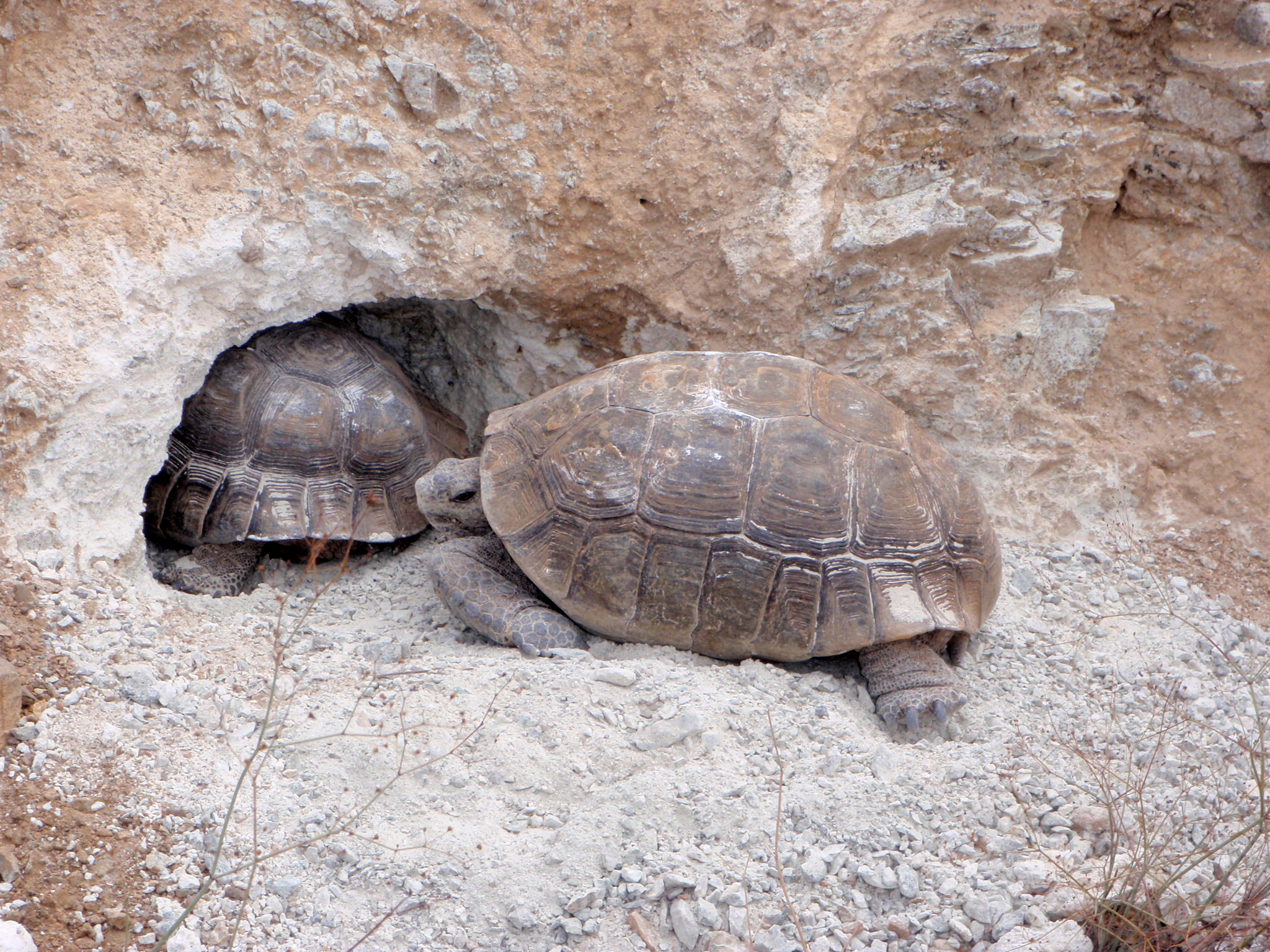
Desert tortoises at a burrow

Around 2,145 combined plant, fungi and animal species have been documented within Joshua Tree National Park, according to the biodiversity database iNaturalist, with over 250 avian, 50 mammalian, 40 reptilian and amphibian, and nearly 1,000 invertebrate species known to inhabit the park boundaries and its immediate vicinities. In addition to the many birds, such as Gambel's quail and the greater roadrunner, numerous lizards, snakes, chipmunks, and California ground squirrels are the animals most likely to be seen by daytime visitors to the area. Golden eagles, ravens, red-tailed hawks, burrowing owls and turkey vultures are among the diurnal raptors and predatory birds that can be seen in the park, as they hunt, sun themselves on rocks, or scan the grounds for carrion. After dark, more owls emerge from their daytime respite to hunt the many rodents and small animals of the park, including the American barn owl, great horned owl, long-eared owl, and the northern saw-whet owl. Additionally, nighttime sees several bat species take-flight, sometimes by the thousands, as they hunt the swarms of various flying insects in the park, or, dependent on species, feed on cactus blossoms and other sources of nectar, thus making the flying mammals vital insect controllers and plant pollinators. Known from Joshua Tree are the big brown bat, California myotis, canyon bats, little brown bats, Mexican free-tailed bats, Nyctinomops bats, pallid bats, Townsend's big-eared bat, and the western bonneted (mastiff) and western yellow bat.

Many of the park's larger mammals prefer to rest in burrows, caves, or other protected hiding spots during the hottest portions of the day, with many being crepuscular in their habits (i.e. most active at sunset and sunrise) and resting sporadically throughout the day and night. Reclusive, but nocturnally-active, mammalian species include the American badger, black-tailed jackrabbit, bobcat, coyote, desert bighorn sheep, gray fox, kangaroo rat, mountain lion, mule deer and ringtail. Occasional sightings (or scat observations) of American black bear have occurred, with the bears likely roaming or exploring from the nearby San Gabriel Mountains (where they are more common). However, no known breeding population of black bear is known to exist permanently within park bounds, as it is likely that Joshua Tree's lower elevation and desert environment is simply unable to support bears long-term.

Herpetiles are very plentiful in the park; among the many snakes are several species of rattlesnake (Crotalus sp.), kingsnake (Lampropeltis sp.), coastal rosy boa (Lichanura orcutti), ground snakes and shovelnose snakes (Sonora sp.), desert nightsnakes (Hypsigiena sp.) and racers and coachwhips (Masticophis sp.), among others. Other species most active at night include banded geckos (Coleonyx sp). The desert tortoise, a threatened reptile species that inhabits the creosote (Larrea tridentata)-studded lowlands of the Mojave Desert, is well-adapted to arid conditions; instead of drinking water directly, most of the tortoise's water is obtained from consuming the creosote bush as well as prickly pear (Opuntia sp.) pads and fruits, amongst other desert plants. The creosote is not only a favorite food for the desert tortoise, but is also one of the primary plants eaten by the chuckwalla, a large, diurnal lizard species. Amphibians, though few, are still present near water sources; the California tree frog (Pseudacris cadaverina) is found in greener, lush areas adjacent to permanent water sources (often created by the Pinto Fault), such as along the northern edge of the park, as well as near natural seeps and rocky areas that collect pooled water. The red-spotted toad (Bufo punctatus) is a true denizen of the desert, as it spends most of its life buried underground in a state of torpor, awaiting seasonal rains to emerge and breed en masse.

The tarantula species Aphonopelma iodium, the green darner (Anax junius) and the giant desert scorpion (Hadrurus arizonensis) are three larger arthropods that can grow to be more than 4 inches (10 cm) long. The yucca moth (Tegeticula synthetica) is responsible for pollinating the Joshua trees after which the park is named.

Animals that thrive in Joshua Tree often have special adaptations for dealing with limited water and high summer temperatures. The smaller mammals and all reptiles take refuge from the heat underground. Desert mammals make more efficient use of their bodies' water supply than the human body. Reptiles are physiologically adapted to thrive with little water, while most birds can fly to water when they most need to drink. Nevertheless, the many hidden springs and seeps in the park are vital for the survival of all resident animals. The majority of reptiles, amphibians, invertebrates, and many small mammals go into an inactive state of hibernation (or torpor) during the colder months. By comparison, winter is the time of greatest birdwatching opportunities in the park, with the region being a prime "rest-stop" for many migratory species on their annual flights to warmer locales.

== Wilderness ==
Of the park's total land area of 790,636 acres (1,235.4 sq mi; 3,199.6 km^{2}), 429,690 acres (671.4 sq mi; 1,738.9 km^{2}) are designated wilderness and managed by the National Park Service (NPS) per the Wilderness Act. The NPS requires registration for overnight camping at specific locations called registration boards. Other requirements include the use of a camp stove (since open campfires are prohibited) and employing Leave No Trace camping techniques (also known as "pack it in, pack it out"). Although bicycles are not allowed in wilderness areas, horses are, but a permit must be obtained in advance for travel in the backcountry. Cellular signals are weak to non-existent and should not be depended on while visiting the park.

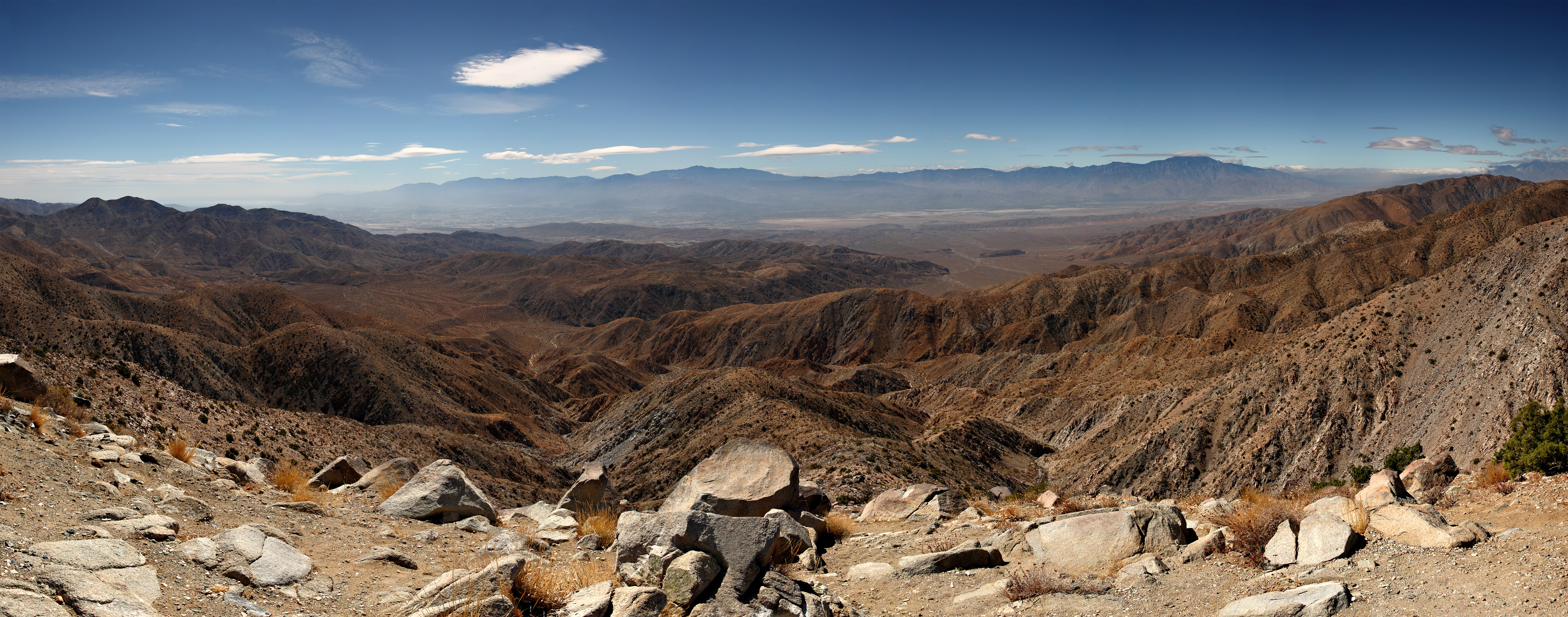
Panorama of the view south from the Keys View in the Little San Bernardino Mountains. Visible landmarks are the Salton Sea (236 ft (72 m) below sea level) at distant left; towards the center, the Santa Rosa Mountains behind Indio, and the San Jacinto Mountains behind Palm Springs; at distant right is the 11,503 ft (3,506 m) San Gorgonio Mountain; the San Andreas Fault is visible in the valley floor.

== Vandalism ==
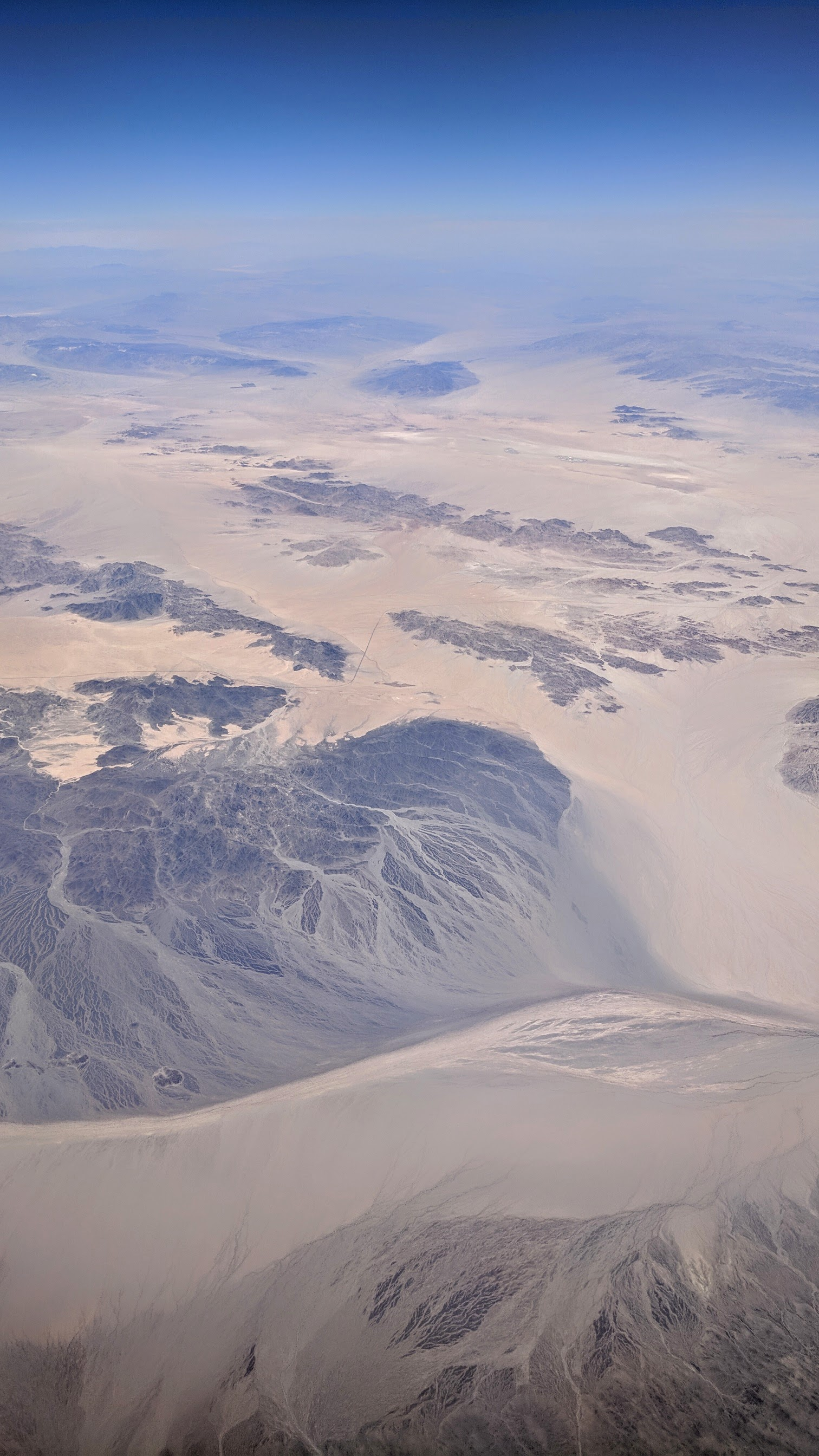
The desert wilderness area in the northeast corner of the park, at the transition zone between the Mojave Desert (background) and the Colorado Desert (foreground)

On April 1, 2015, graffiti artist André was convicted and fined for vandalizing a boulder in the park. André had posted photos of his artwork on social media. Casey Schreiner (of the hiking blog Modern Hiker) and some of his followers aided the National Park Service in locating and identifying André's vandalism. Before his conviction, André had attempted to silence reporting with legal threats.

During the 2018–2019 federal government shutdown, only eight park rangers were on duty; during this time, reports of vandalism spiked, as park visitors reportedly felled Joshua trees for firewood, set illegal campfires, drove off-road, and spray-painted rocks. Park botanists subsequently determined that one of three Joshua trees reported to have been cut down or otherwise damaged during the shutdown had been felled prior to the shutdown.

== See also ==
- List of national parks of the United States
- California Desert Protection Act of 1994
- Eureka Peak
- Mojave and Colorado Deserts Biosphere Reserve
- National parks in California
- National Register of Historic Places listings in Joshua Tree National Park
- Wonderland Ranch Wash
