= Bajada (geography) =

Compound alluvial fan

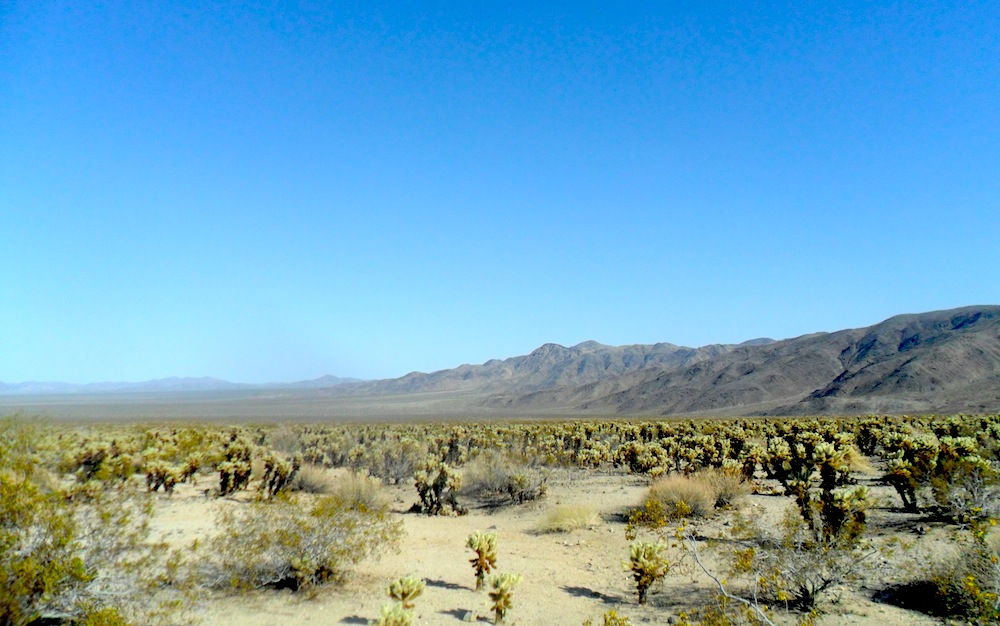
Bajadas below the Hexie Mountains as seen from Joshua Tree National Park

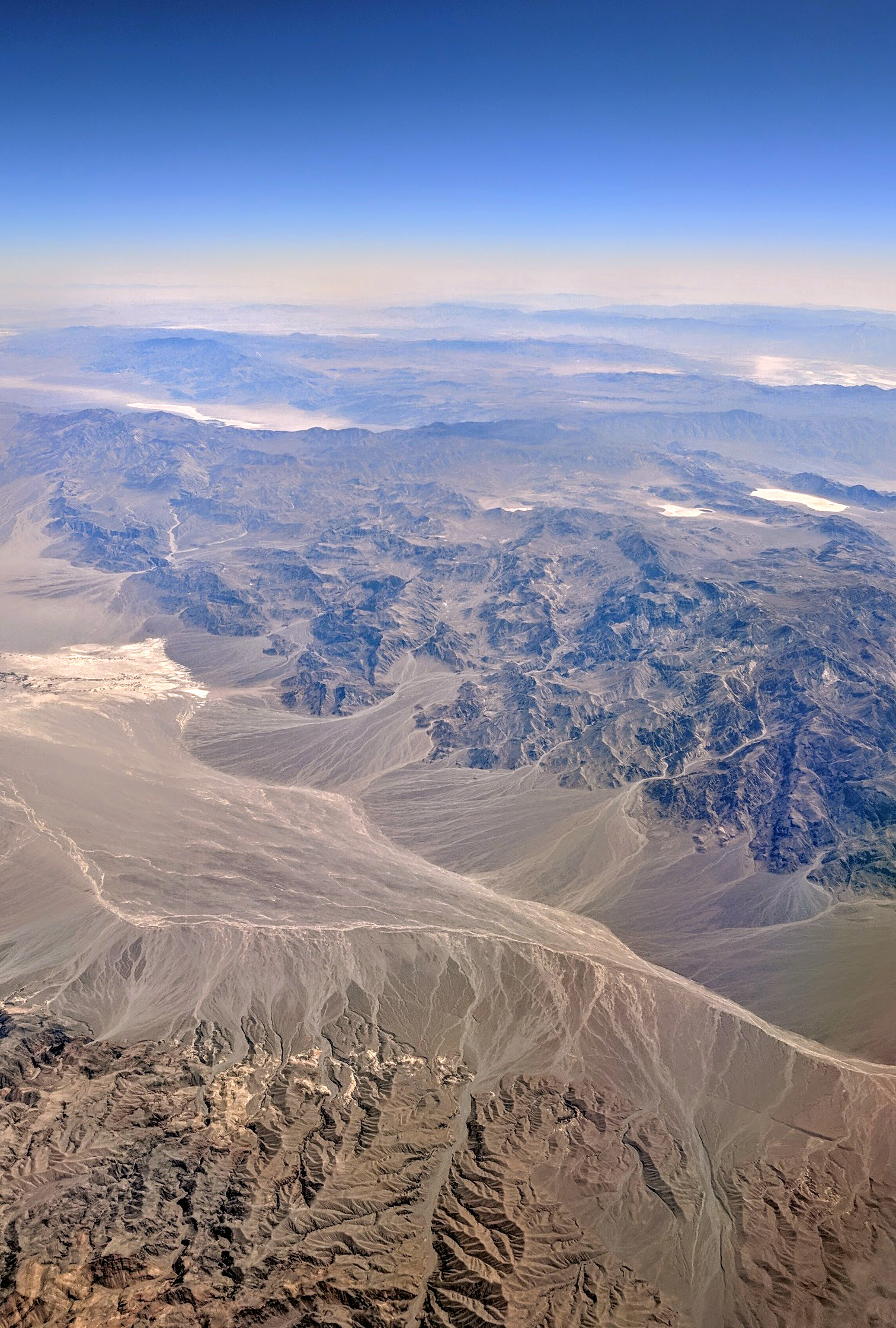
Death Valley north of Stovepipe Wells has bajadas on both sides of the valley, more well developed on the Panamint Range side (far side in this aerial view from the northeast).

A bajada consists of a series of coalescing alluvial fans along a mountain front. These fan-shaped deposits form by the deposition of sediment within a stream onto flat land at the base of a mountain. The usage of the term in landscape description or geomorphology derives from the Spanish word bajada, generally having the sense of "descent" or "inclination".

== Formation and occurrence ==
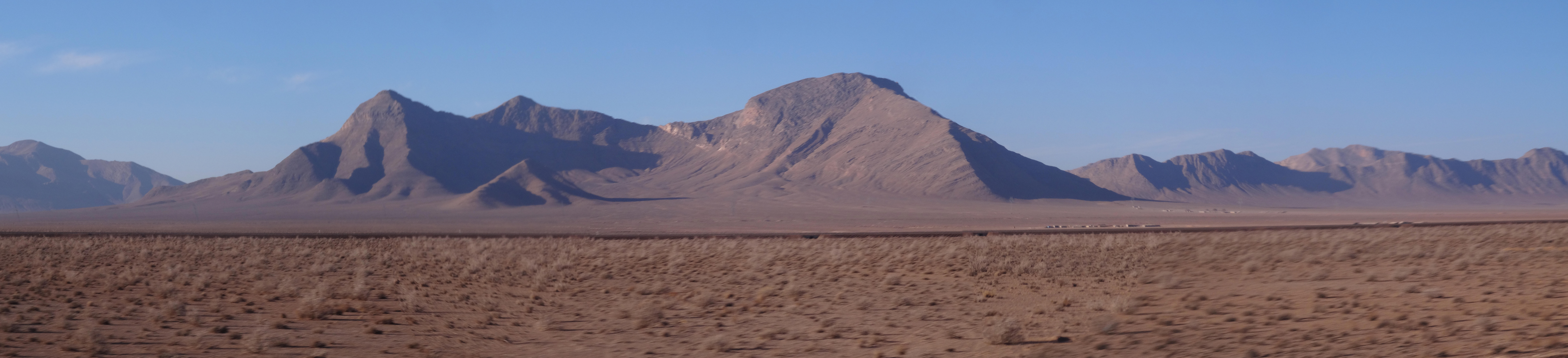
Bajada in Iran's Fars province

When a stream flows downhill, it picks up sediment along with other materials. As this stream emerges from a mountain front, the sediment carried begins to be deposited, such that coarser sediment is deposited closest to the base and the finer sediment grades outwards and deposits in a fan-shape away from the mountain face. The sediment is transported across a pediment into a closed basin where the bajadas grade back into a pediment, making the boundary difficult to distinguish. Bajadas frequently contain playa lakes. Bajadas are common in dry climates (e.g., the Southwestern US) where flash floods deposit sediment over time, although they are also common in wetter climates where streams are nearly continuously depositing sediment.
