= Ruby Lee Mill Site =

Coordinates: 33°50′19″N 115°49′22″W

Ruby Lee Mill Site is located in the Hexie Mountains, in the Mojave Desert. The site is within Joshua Tree National Park, in Riverside County, California. It is named after Ruby Lee Rule, who filed a lode claim for quartz in 1936.

Rule signed the land over to A. A. Dietemann and his wife Mable in 1948, who later lost their claim when the site became part of Joshua Tree National Park. A. A. Dietemann is best known for his lawsuit against Time Magazine. He claimed to heal people with herbs and clay, and Time Magazine published an article calling him a "quack" with facts gathered by reporters who posed as patients. This was declared a violation of privacy by the Ninth Circuit Court of Appeals.

The Ruby Lee Mill was established in 1935. A stamp mill may have been used to crush ore in order to extract minerals. A report on the site lists trace amounts of gold and silver in quartz veins.

There are a number of mines in the vicinity. Water is needed in the milling process. There is a nearby well, which was dry by 1974. The milling machine is no longer present, but may have sat on a concrete foundation.

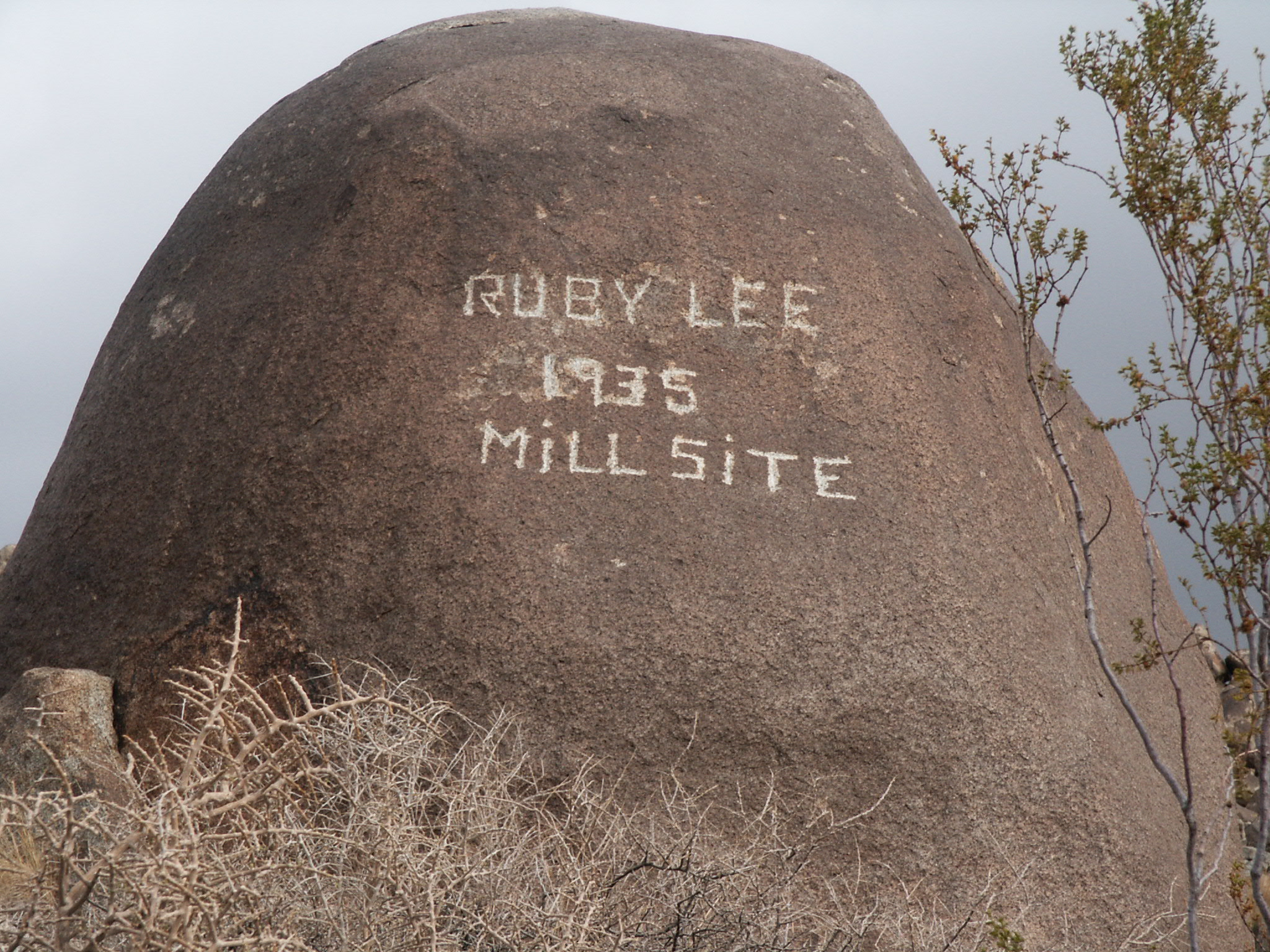
Rock at Ruby Lee

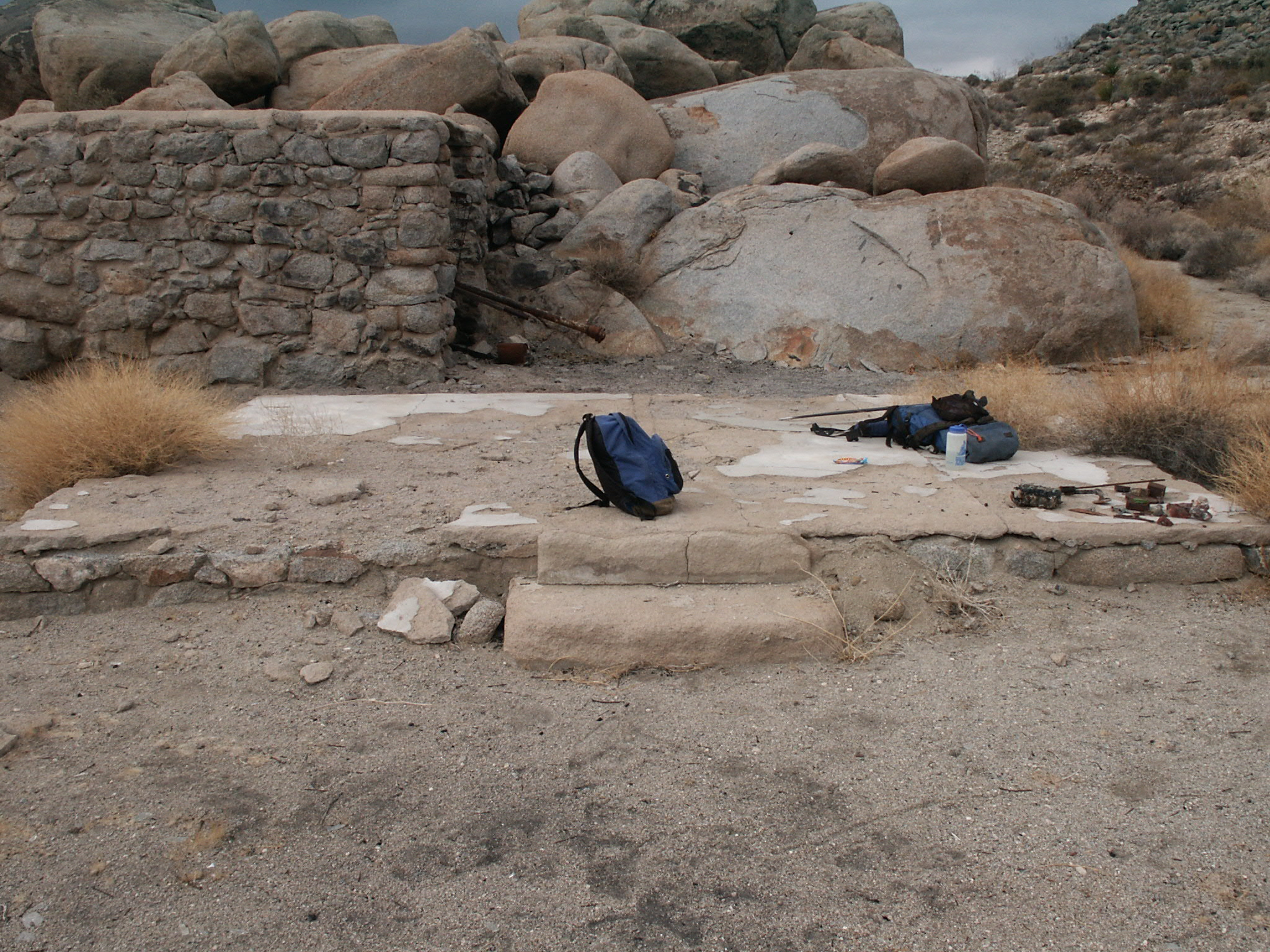
Mill foundation at Ruby Lee

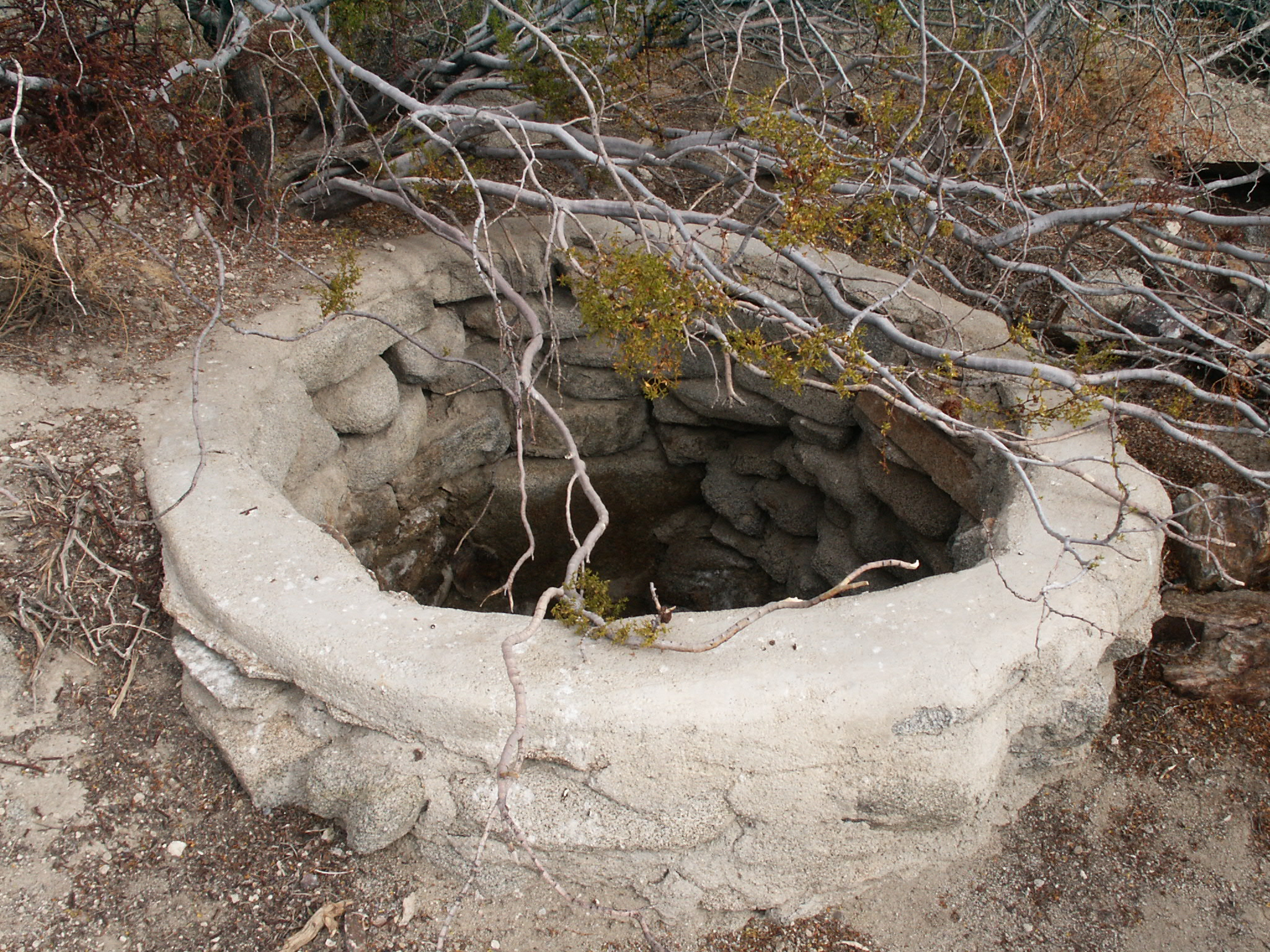
Well at Ruby Lee

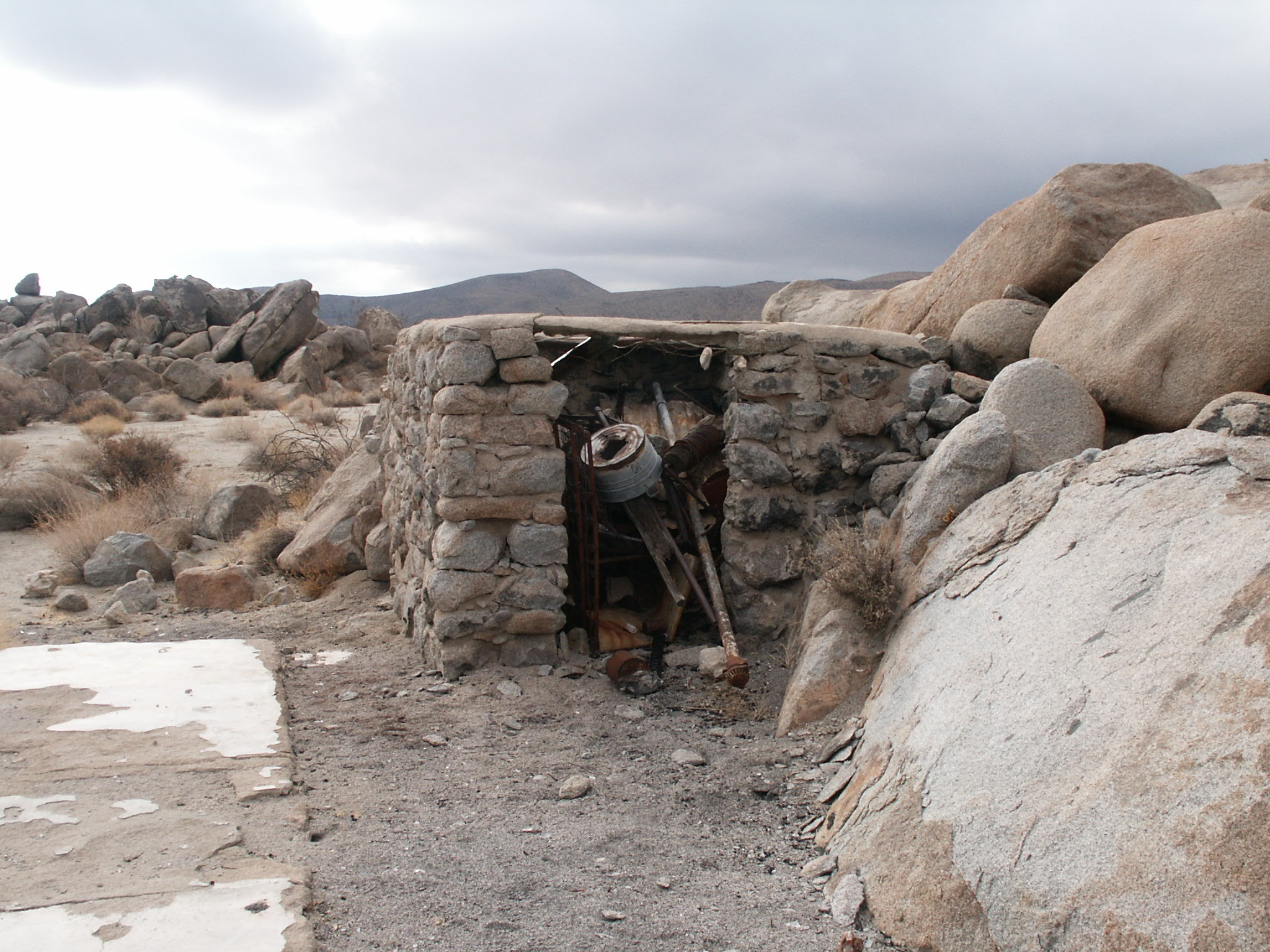
Building at Ruby Lee
