= Hidden Valley (Joshua Tree National Park) =

Hiking trail

Coordinates: 34°0′49.85″N 116°10′13.83″W

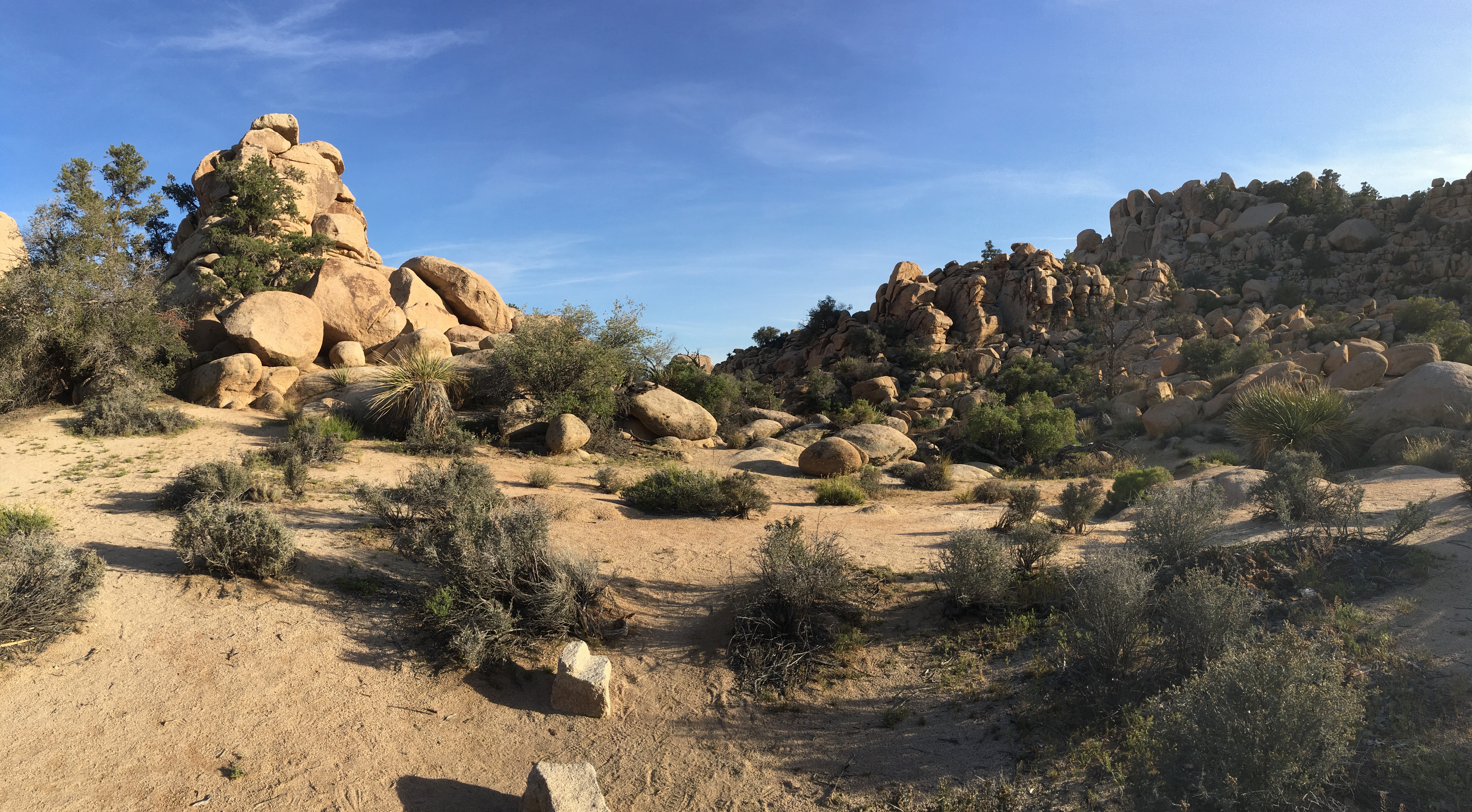
Panorama of Hidden Valley

Hidden Valley is a self-guiding, one-mile loop trail that winds among massive boulders through what was believed to be a legendary cattle rustlers' hideout. It is one of the most popular and scenic hiking trails in Joshua Tree National Park. The area is also a popular rock-climbing area. Many visitors enjoy just watching the climbers in action.

Because of the Hidden Valley's natural encasement, a unique micro-habitat brings together a wide range of plants and animals not typically found together in other sections of the Park. Healthy populations of Joshua Tree, pinyon, juniper and oak share space with mesquite, yucca, nolina, various cacti and other species.

According to various sources, In 1936, desert pioneer Bill Keys blasted a notch through the rocks walls to improve access for his cattle herds. Today this serves as Hidden Valley's main access point.

A nearby campground is available for tenting and small RVs, 25' or less.
