= Hexie Mountains =

Mountain range in California, United States

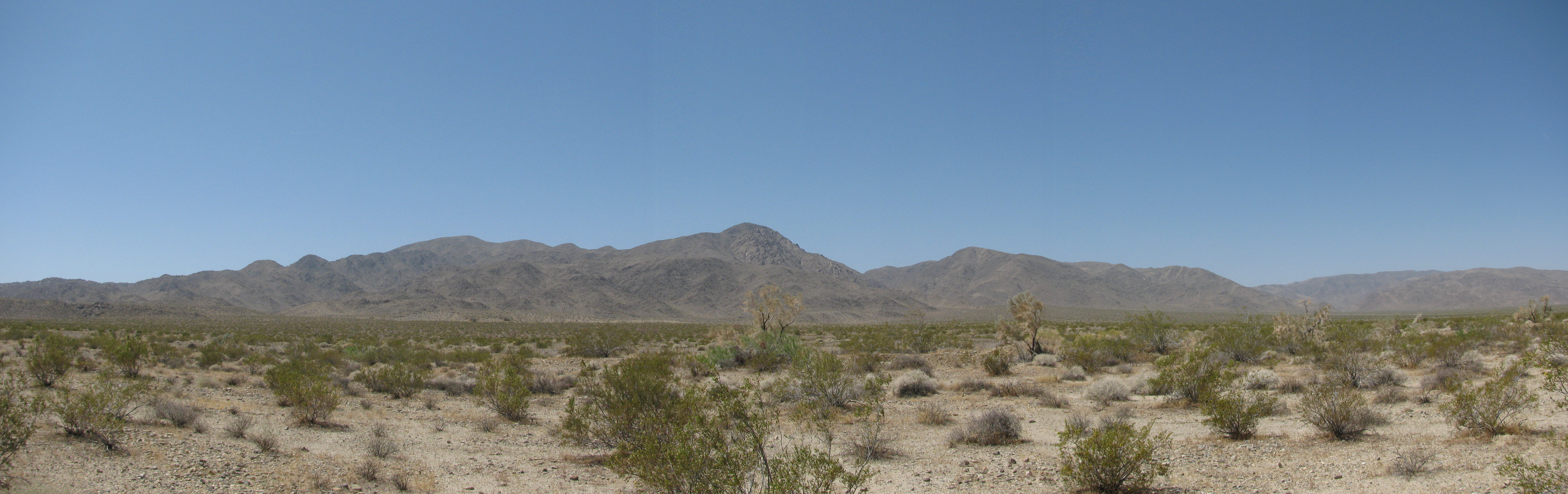
- Hexie Mountains seen from the north

Highest point
- Elevation: 1,167 m (3,829 ft)
- Coordinates: 33°53′12.039″N 115°57′20.992″W

Geography
- Location within California Location within the United States
- Country: United States
- State: California
- District: Riverside County
- Range coordinates: 33°53′12″N 115°57′21″W
- Borders on: Eagle Mountains
- Topo map: USGS Fried Liver Wash

The Hexie Mountains are a desert mountain range located in Joshua Tree National Park, in southern California.

== Geography ==
The range is located in the higher northern Mojave Desert area of the park. They are north of the Cottonwood Mountains, and south of the Pinto Mountains. The Eagle Mountains lie to the east of the Hexie Mountains.

== Natural history ==
Numerous washes drain the Hexie Mountains, including Porcupine Wash and Fried Liver Wash. These host a mixture of low and high desert animals and plants. A herd of desert bighorn sheep also live there.

== History ==
There were attempts to mine and mill gold at many sites, including Ruby Lee Mill, and none were successful. Native petroglyphs can also be found in the Hexie Mountains.

'Hexie Mountains' is the title of the eleventh song on the sophomore album Bronco by country artist Orville Peck.
