= Quail Mountain (California) =

Mountain in California, United States

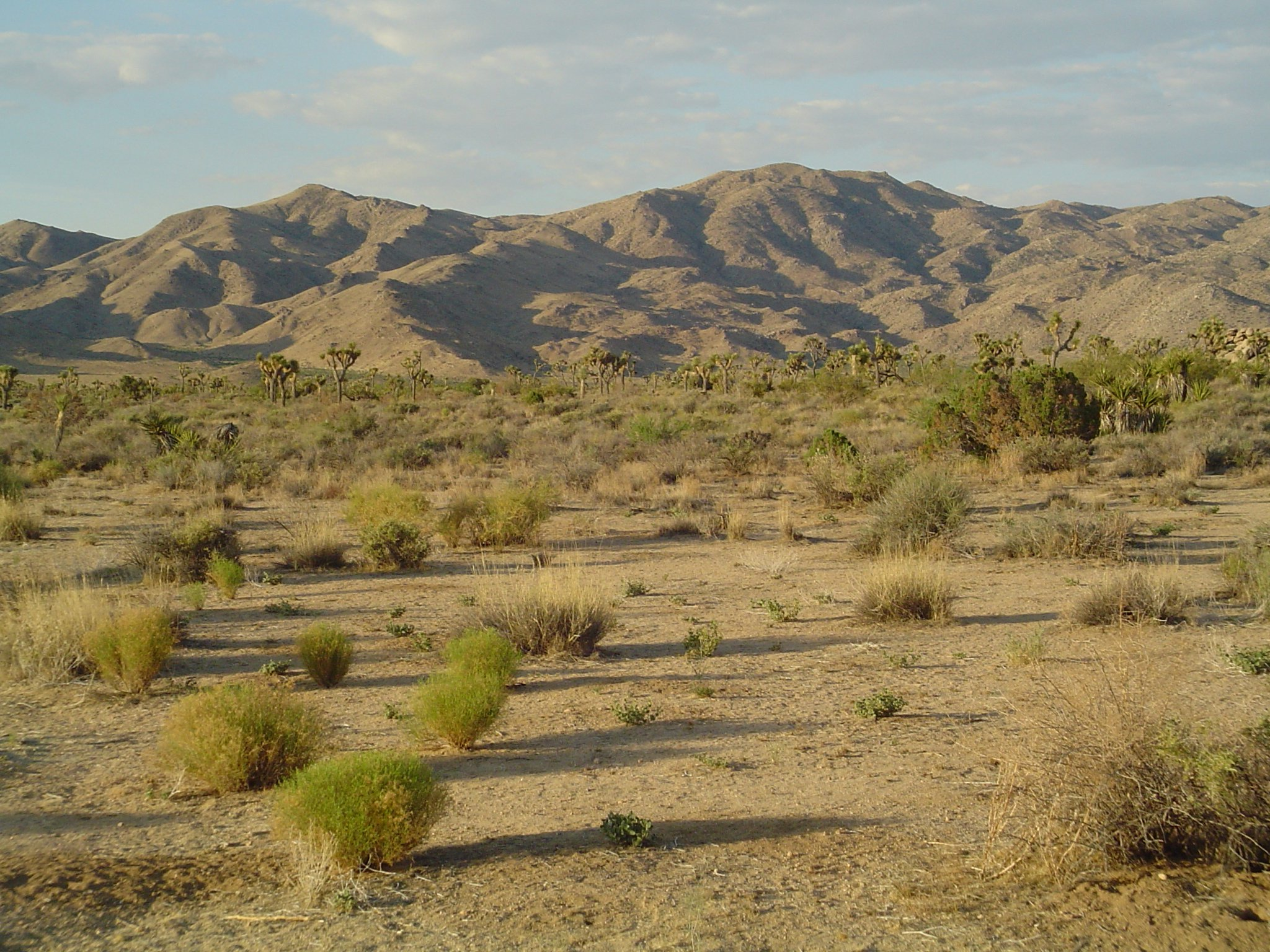

Highest point
- Elevation: 5,816 ft (1,773 m) NAVD 88
- Prominence: 2,293 ft (699 m)
- Listing: Hundred Peaks Section
- Coordinates: 34°00′26″N 116°14′29″W

Geography
- Location: Joshua Tree National Park; Riverside County, California U.S.
- Parent range: Little San Bernardino Mountains
- Topo map: USGS Indian Cove

Climbing
- Easiest route: Moderate hike class 1

Quail Mountain, at 5,816 feet (1,773 m), is the highest mountain in Joshua Tree National Park and the highest point in the Little San Bernardino Mountains. It is one of the southernmost peaks in the Transverse Ranges, with the Peninsular Ranges just across the Colorado Desert and Coachella Valley.

== Trails ==
The regular route utilizes the California Riding and Hiking Trail starting from Keys View road and traverses barren, burned desert 4.5 miles (7.2 km) to Juniper Flats. From there it is about 1.5 miles (2.4 km) more of cross-country hiking to the flat summit which is marked by a large cairn. There are no trails to the summit; all routes involve cross-country hiking. Shade is scarce on the route due to geography and limited flora.

== Natural history ==
=== Flora ===
Quail Mountain was previously covered with old-growth California juniper (Juniperus californica) and Single-leaf Pinyon (Pinus monophylla), Joshua tree (Yucca brevifolia), and Coastal sage scrub oak (Quercus dumosa) woodland.

Several wildfires burned over the mountain, including the Juniper Complex Fire of 1999, leaving it barren of taller woody plants. There are few surviving Pinyon pines and California junipers, serving as the source for new generation.

=== Fauna ===
Desert Bighorn Sheep live in the Little San Bernardino Mountains.

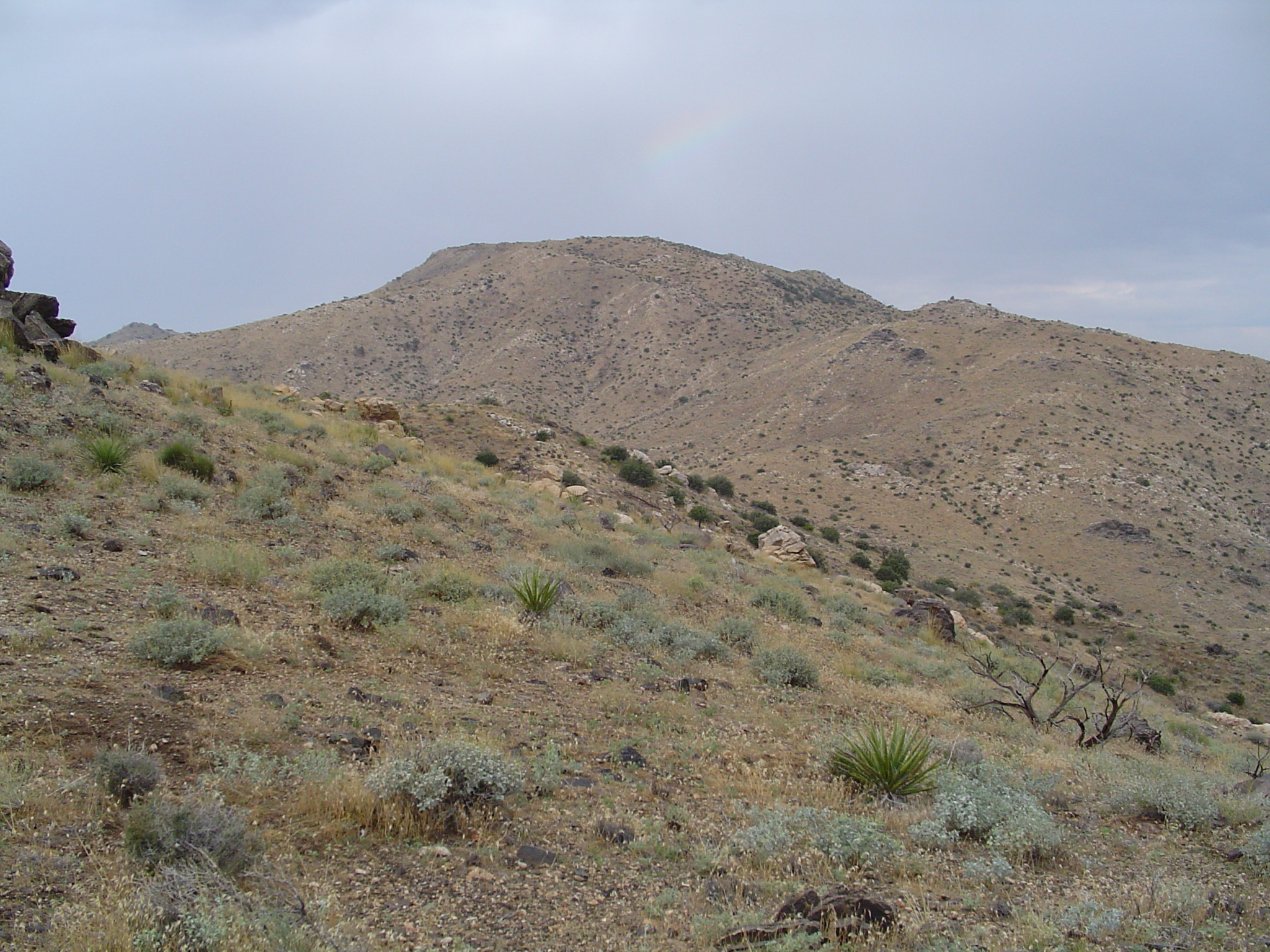

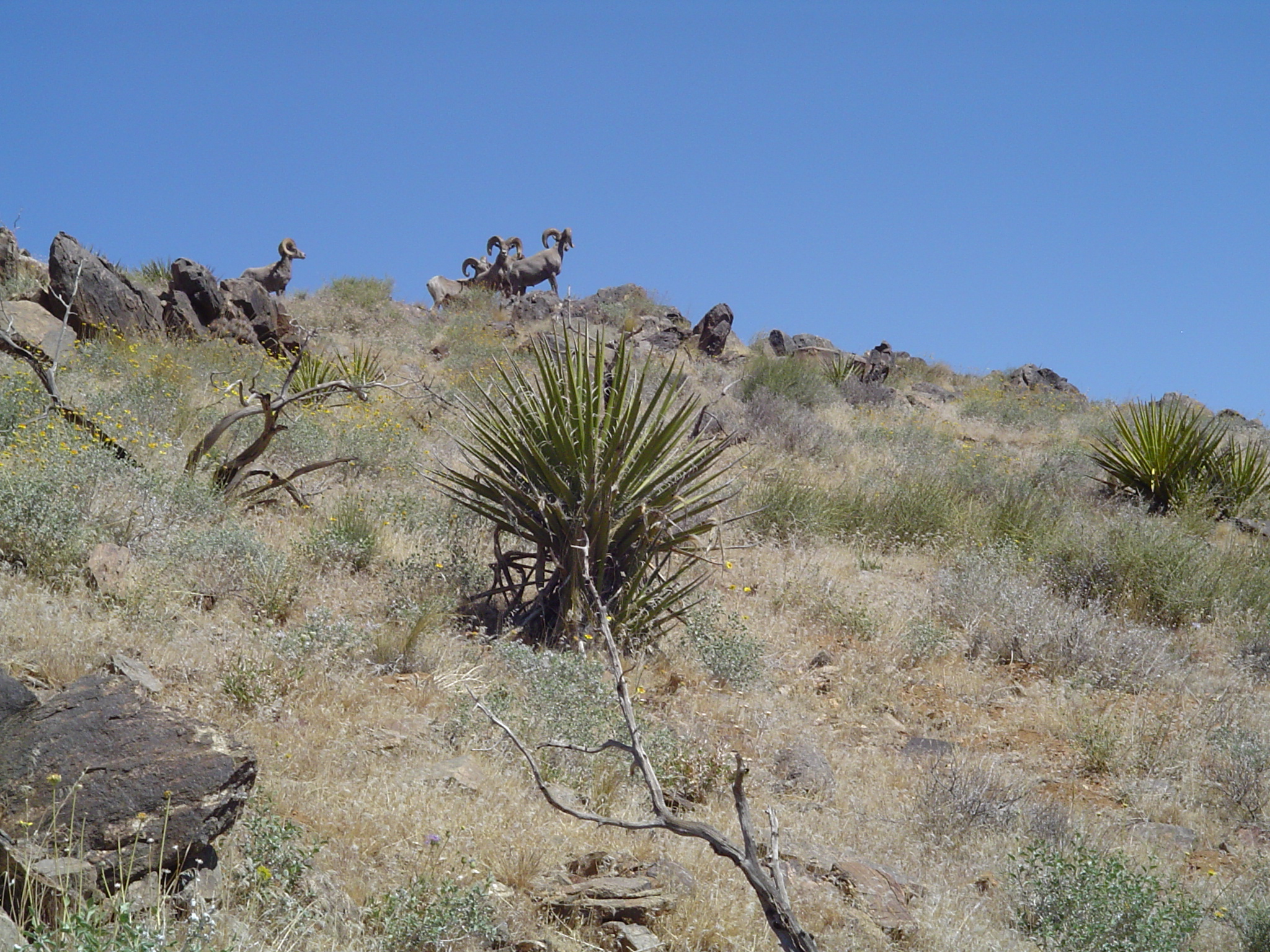

== Event history ==
Aircraft wreckage can be found on the mountain. On February 4, 1999, two civilian T-28s (N628B and N128BJ) piloted by Bill Jones and Greg Weber crashed into the side of the mountain, killing both pilots. They were en-route to Thermal Airport from Van Nuys Airport as a flight of two and impacted at the 5,300-foot (1,600 m) level on the west side of the mountain. At the time of the accident, the Little San Bernardino Mountains were obscured by cloud cover.

== See also ==
- California montane chaparral and woodlands
- Deserts and xeric shrublands
- Desert ecology
- Joshua Tree National Park
