= Eureka Peak (California) =

Mountain in California, United States of America

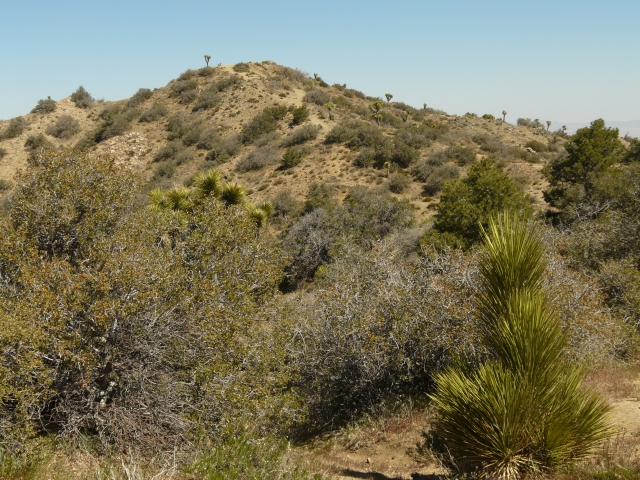
- Summit of Eureka Peak on April 18, 2009

Highest point
- Elevation: 5,521 ft (1,683 m) NAVD 88
- Coordinates: 34°01′57″N 116°21′01″W

Geography
- Location within California
- Location: Joshua Tree National Park, Riverside County, California, U.S.
- Parent range: Little San Bernardino Mountains
- Topo map: USGS Joshua Tree South

Climbing
- Easiest route: Eureka Peak Road

Eureka Peak is a mountain in the Black Rock Canyon region of Joshua Tree National Park in the U.S. state of California. The peak is the 4th highest summit in the park after Quail Mountain, Queen Mountain and Inspiration Peak. The Eureka Peak Road, an unpaved dirt road, leads up to the summit from Upper Covington Flat and is drivable by 4-wheel drive vehicles under suitable conditions. Mountain biking is also very popular on this peak.

An alternative route, the Eureka Peak Trail, branches off the California Riding and Hiking Trail and ascends the peak from the north.

The upper slopes of the mountain may occasionally see snow in winter.
