= Lost Palms Oasis Trail =

Hiking trail in US national park

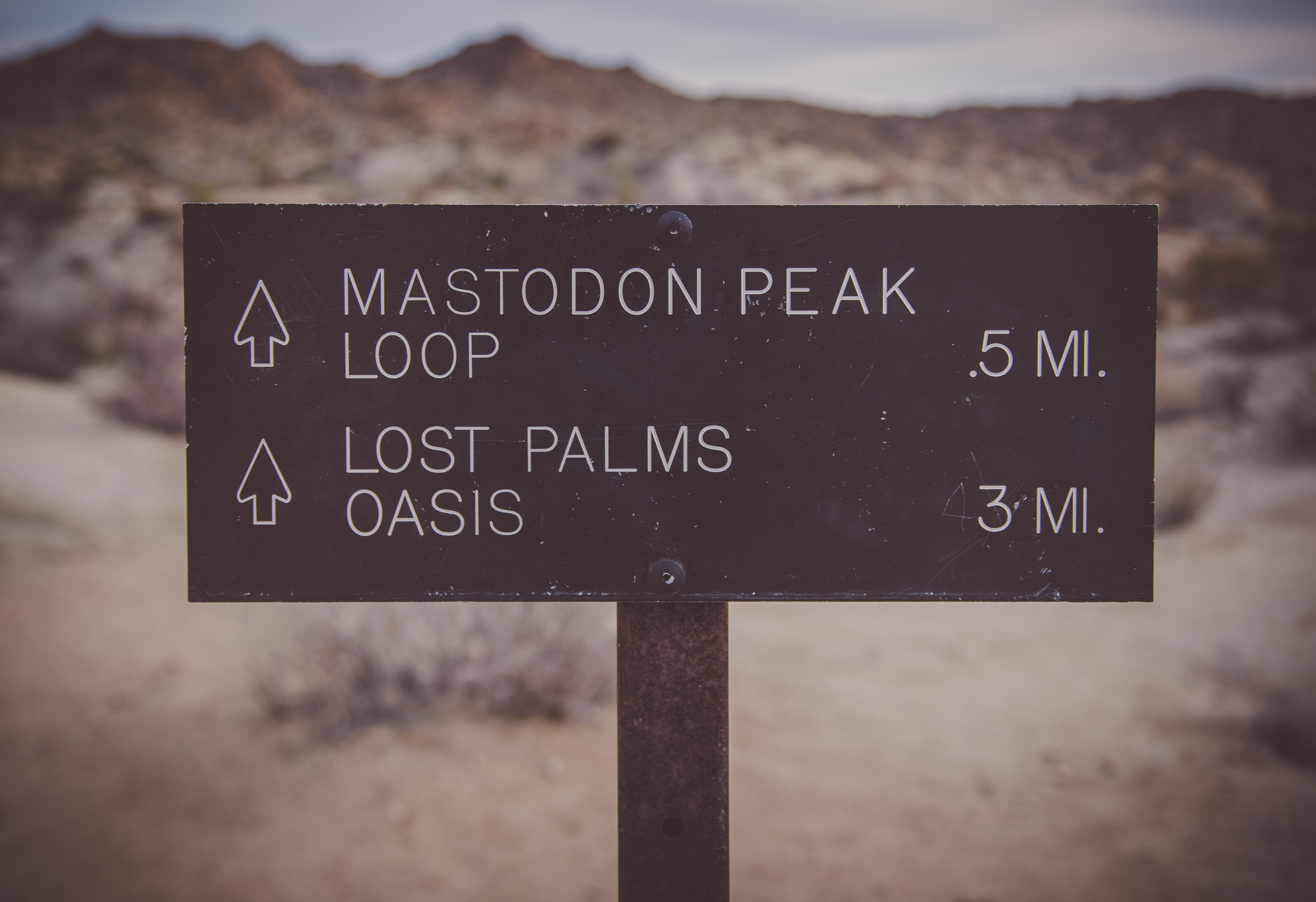
Joshua Tree Lost Palms Oasis Trailhead

Lost Palms Oasis Trail is a 7.2-mile (11.6 km) day-hike trail located in the southernmost part of Joshua Tree National Park. The trail is generally completed in a loop. Known for the beautiful palm trees from which the trail gets its name, this hike is also known for its great bouldering, pools of water, and the ever-elusive "Victory Palms". Deemed by the National Park Service as a day-use-only area, this trail is also home to bighorn sheep who use the pools as their main source of water.

The trail does have an access fee, collected upon entry to the national park. Hikers are allowed to backcountry camp off of the trail, however they are not allowed to set up camp directly in the oasis of trees itself. The National Park Service also has a strict rule prohibiting pets on the trail.

== Trail description ==
Joshua Tree National Park is a desert, so recommended hiking times are from October through April. The trail is one of the most widely used in the park, so it is well-marked with trail markers.

== Hiking the trail ==
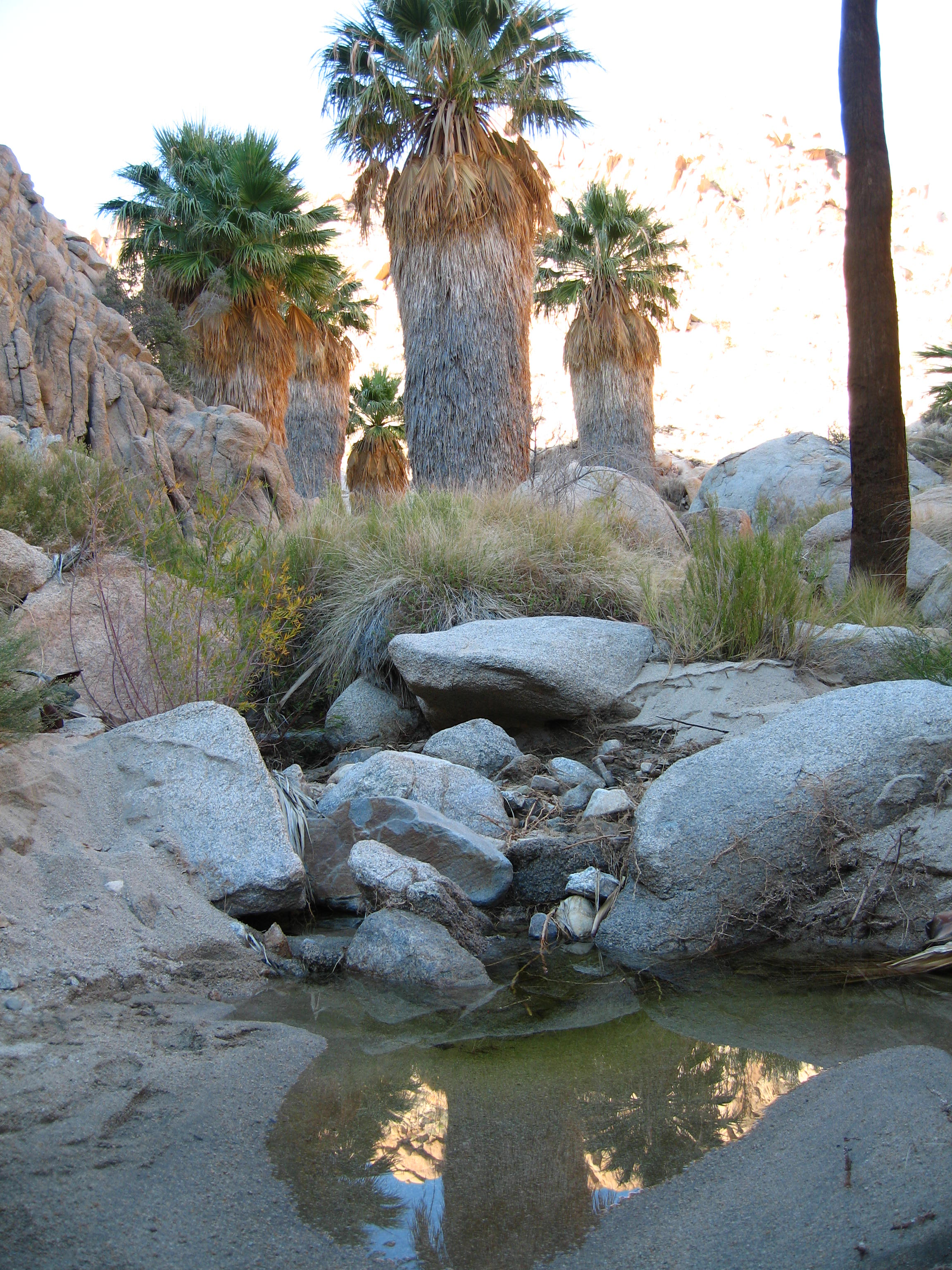
Lost Palms Oasis

The trail begins at Cottonwood Spring trail-head near the Cottonwood Spring campsite. The trail-head splits off into three different trails, and the Lost Palms Oasis is the southeast most trail that heads above the oasis for 0.3 miles (0.48 km). The highest point of this trail is at the 0.7-mile (1.1 km) marker, where the trail rises up to 3,073 feet (937 m). As the trail continues along the ridge of the mountain, descent occurs towards the end of the trail, as a hiker nears the Lost Palms Oasis. At the end of the trail is there is a secondary path, where a hiker can either turn around or continue on towards another set of palm trees that have been named the "Victory Palms", due to the difficult scrambling among the rocks required to reach them. The trail splits up into other various side treks that lead to many places across the park. These side trails lead to the tops of mountain peaks, as well as to abandoned mine shafts that are scattered throughout the southeastern part of the park.

== Precautions ==
The National Park Service recommends bringing a lot of water, approximately two US gallons (7.6 L; 1.7 imp gal) per person per day, and even more during high temperatures. There are no restrooms along the trail, and the National Park Service has a strict policy entitled "Leave No Trace", which focuses on preserving and caring for the park and the animals that inhabit it. The trail is also home to many bees who try to receive moisture any way they can, which means they are attracted to people.
