= Little San Bernardino Mountains =

Mountain range of the Transverse Ranges in California, United States

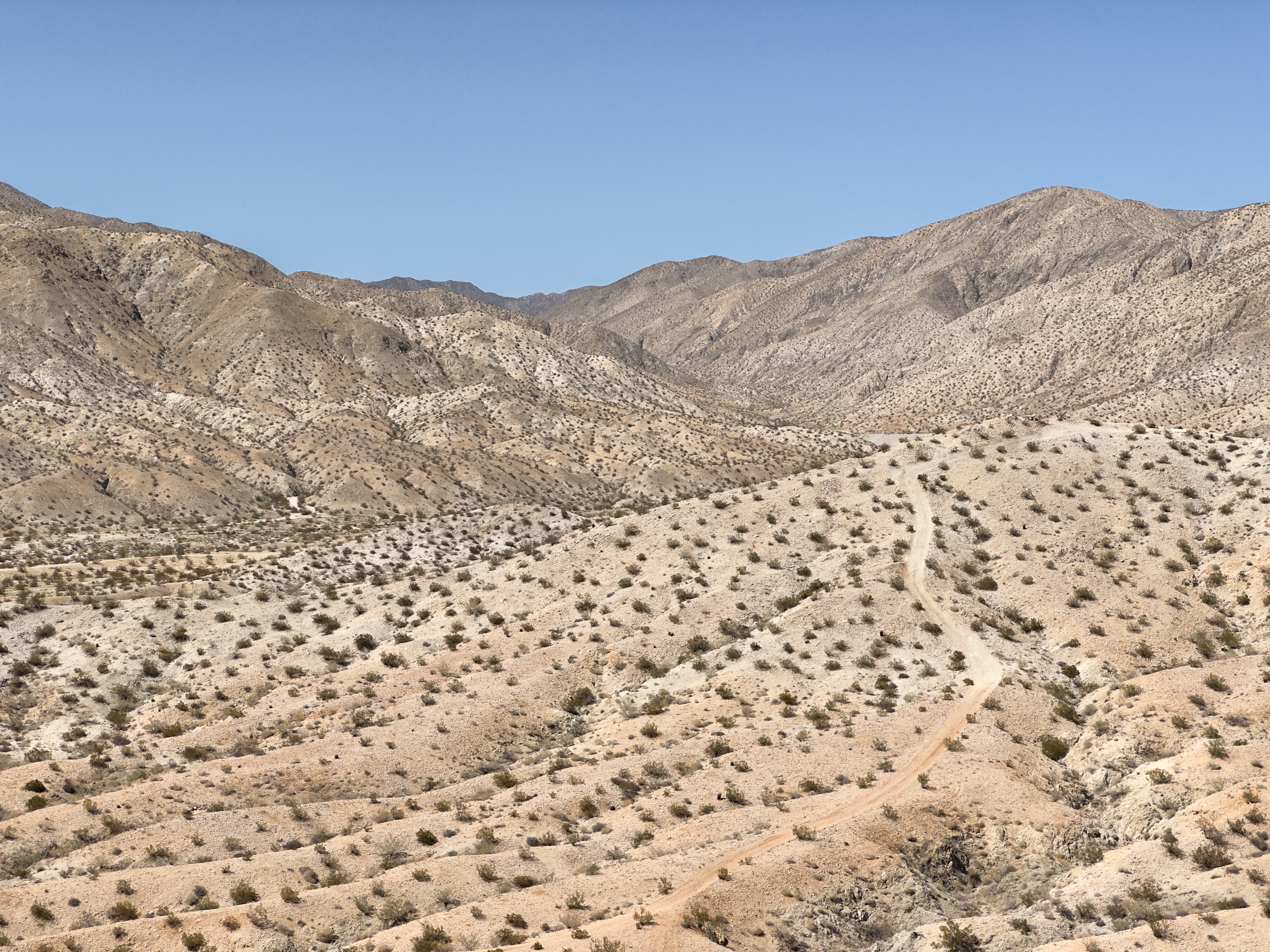
- Little San Bernardino Mountains near Desert Edge, California

Highest point
- Elevation: 1,772 m (5,814 ft)

Geography
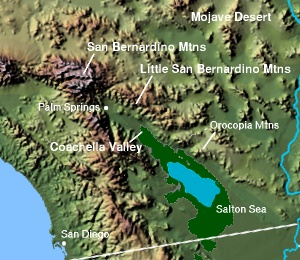
- Little San Bernardino Mountains Location of Little San Bernardino Mountains in California
- Country: United States
- State: California
- District: Riverside / San Bernardino
- Range coordinates: 33°58′27.039″N 116°19′0.031″W
- Topo map: USGS East Deception Canyon

The Little San Bernardino Mountains are a short mountain range of the Transverse Ranges, located in southern California in the United States. They extend for approximately 40 mi (64 km) southeast from the San Bernardino Mountains through San Bernardino and Riverside Counties to near the northeast edge of the Salton Sink and Salton Sea.

The community of Palm Springs looks north and northeast across the Coachella Valley to the range.

== Geography ==
The range transitions the separation from the Coachella Valley in the Colorado Desert on the south to the Mojave Desert on the north. The peaks vary in height from approximately 4,000–5,000 ft (1,200–1,500 m). The range highpoint is Quail Mountain (California), elevation 5,813 ft (1,772 m). Other peaks in the range include Mount Inspiration and Eureka Peak.

== Habitats ==
Much of the central and eastern parts of the range are within Joshua Tree National Park. Big Morongo Canyon Preserve is located in the western end of the Little San Bernardino Mountains. The oasis here contains one of the ten largest cottonwood (Populus fremontii) and red willow (Salix laevigata) Riparian zone habitats in California. It was identified as an area of concern by the Bureau of Land Management in 1982. It also has the only native palm to California, Washingtonia filifera, or the Desert fan palm which is now common in artificial landscaping.

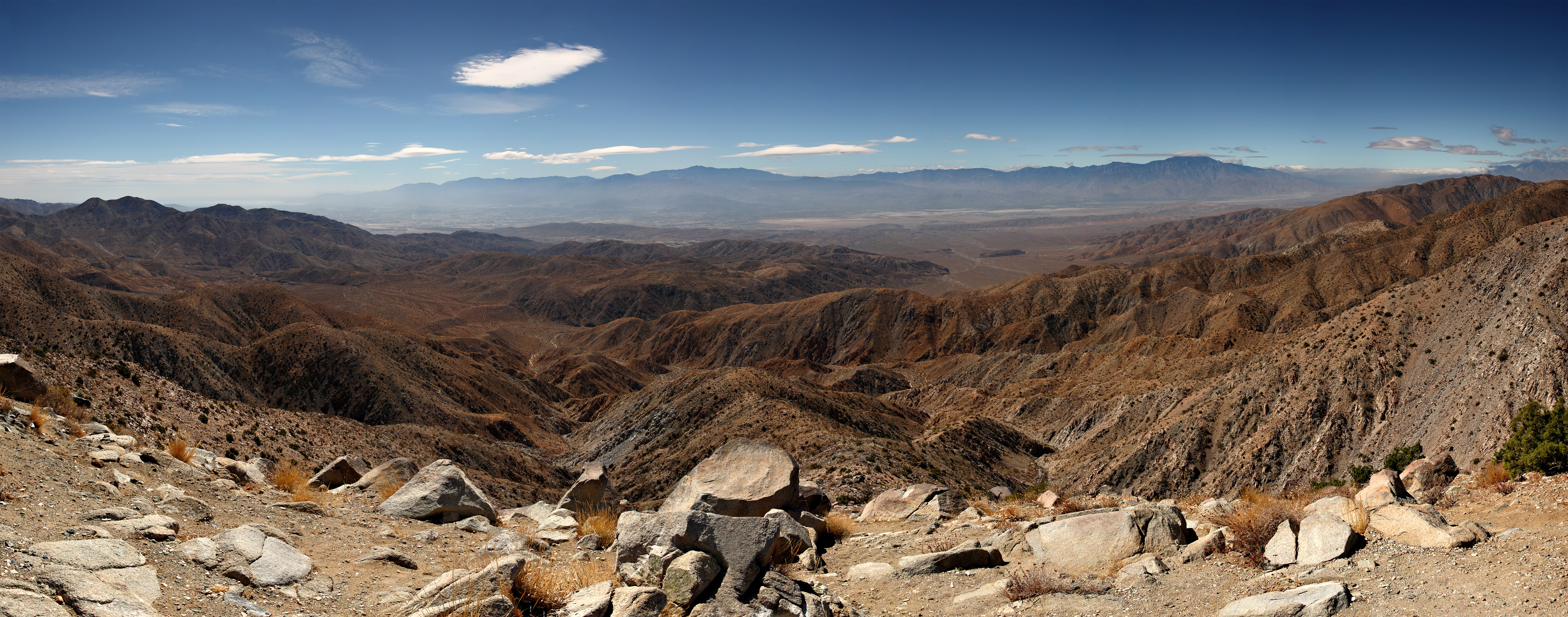
Looking south from Keys View in the Little San Bernardino Mountains in Joshua Tree National Park. Visible landmarks are the Salton Sea at rear left, and the Santa Rosa Mountains behind Indio and the San Jacinto Mountains behind Palm Springs in center. In the valley floor, the San Andreas Fault is visible. At rear right is 11,500 ft San Gorgonio Mountain.}

== Aqueduct ==
The Colorado River Aqueduct, which provides water for Los Angeles, San Bernardino, and San Diego, runs along the southwest edge of the mountains.

== See also ==
- Cahuilla
