= Fortynine Palms Oasis =

Desert oasis in California, USA

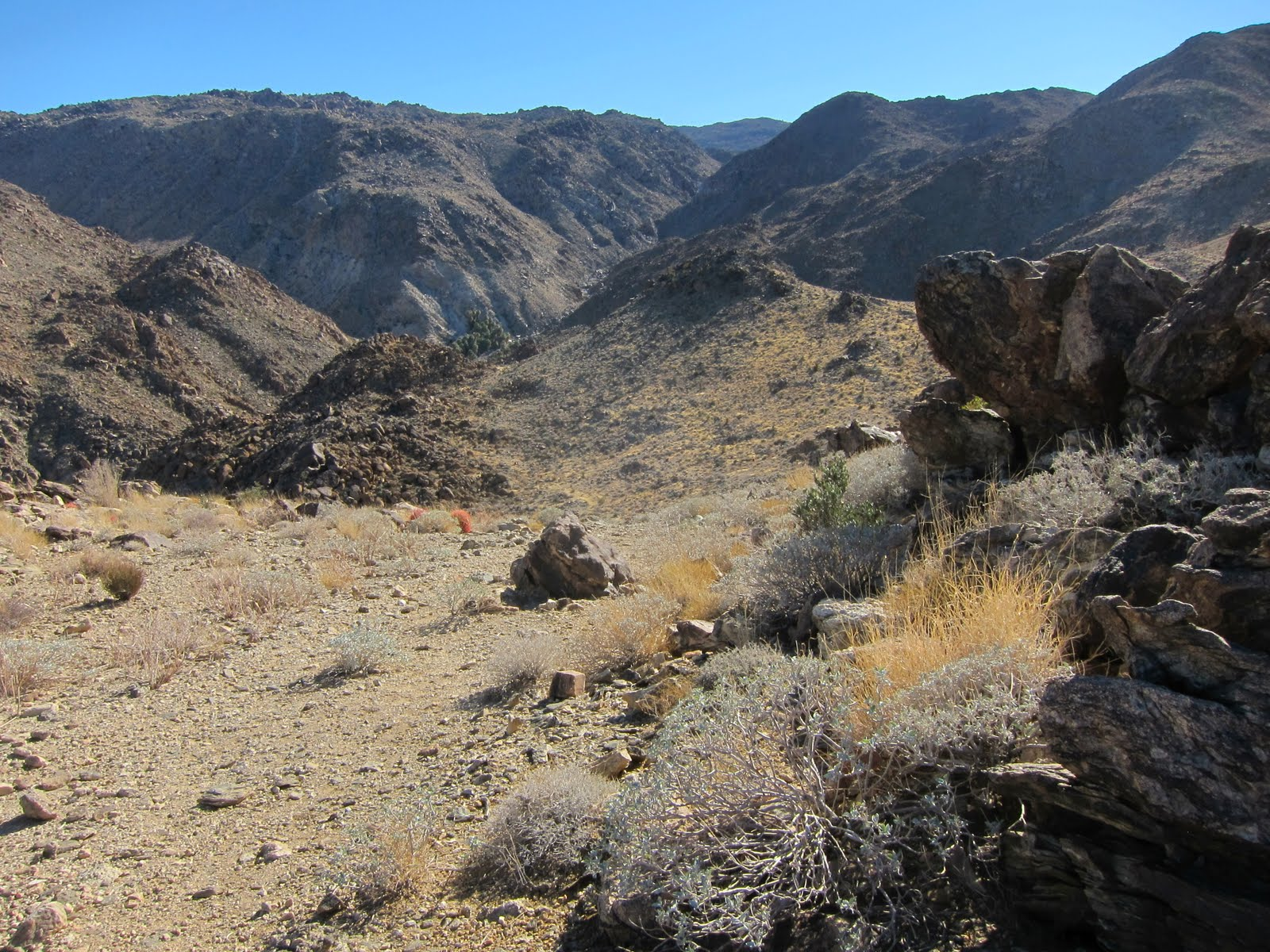
Forty Nine Palms Oasis Trail - panoramio

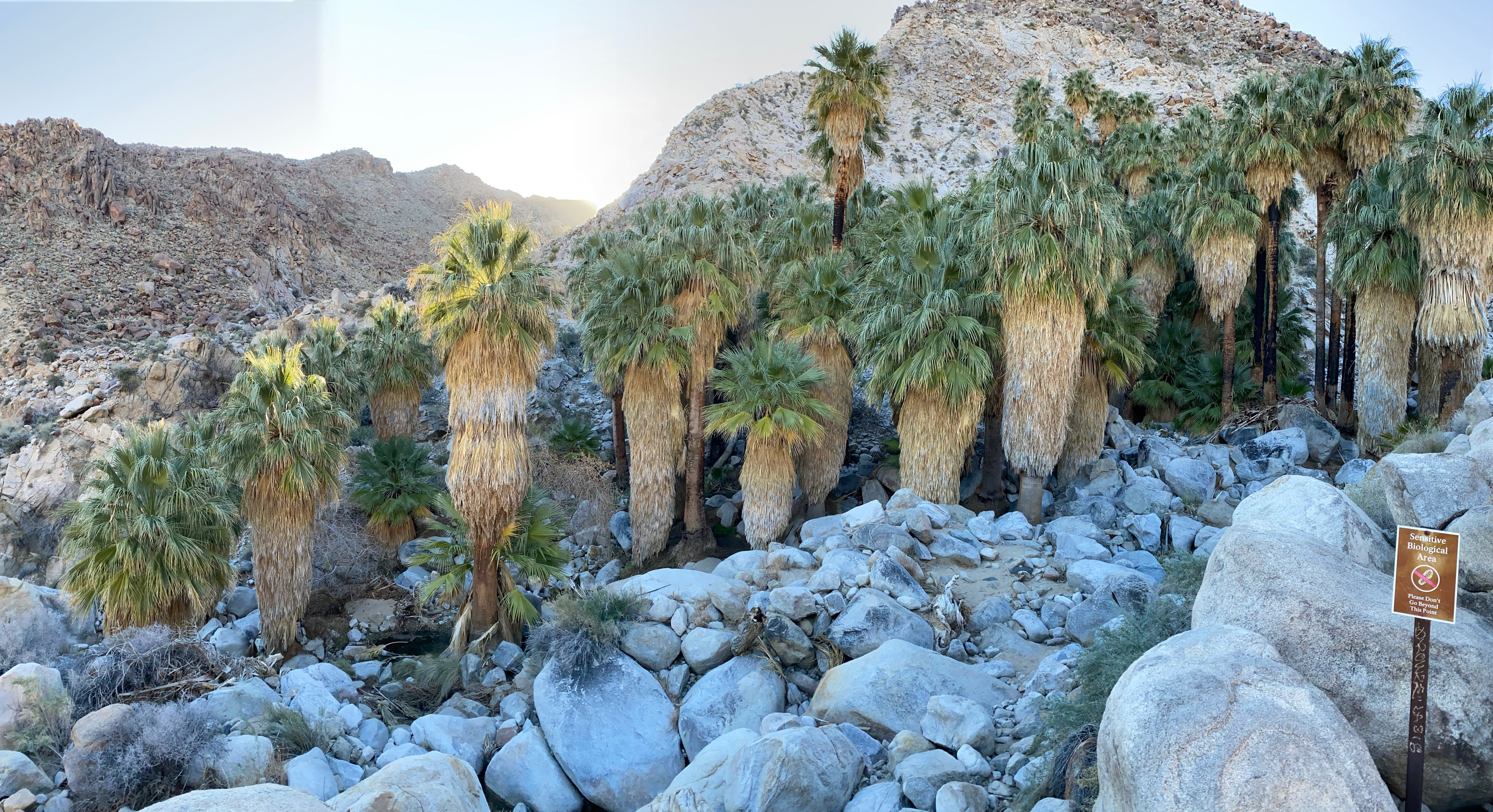
Fan Palms of Fortynine Palms Oasis

Fortynine Palms Oasis is in oasis located in Joshua Tree National Park, California, accessible via the Fortynine Palms Oasis Trail, a three-mile, out and back trail, with a 300-foot elevation gain in both directions.

== Information ==
The trail starts at Fortynine Palms Parking Area, goes up and over a ridge dotted with barrel cacti, and descends to a palm oasis in a rocky canyon. The palm trees were planted by miners in the early 1900s to easily locate the natural spring located there. The oasis is frequently used as a watering hole for bighorn sheep. In July 2018 a Canadian hiker, Paul Miller, went missing while on the trail. His remains were found off the trail in January 2020.
