= Wonderland Ranch Wash =

Arroyo in California, United States

Coordinates: 34.0756°N 116.1501°W

Wonderland Ranch Wash is an arroyo in the U.S. state of California. It is located in San Bernardino County.
