= Eagle Mountains =

Mountain range of the Transverse Ranges in California, United States

The Eagle Mountains are located in northeastern Riverside County, California, U.S.

== Geography ==
The range lies to the north of Interstate 10 (California) off County Route R2 (California) and west— and southwest of the Coxcomb Mountains. They are the location of Eagle Mountain, the Kaiser Steel Eagle Mountain iron mine's ghost town, and one of the largest open pit iron ore mines, now closed, in the country.

The Eagle Mountains lie partly within eastern Joshua Tree National Park. The mountains reach an elevation of 1,631-meter (5,351 ft) inside the park, at the western end of the range near Cottonwood Pass.

They are in the Colorado Desert region of the Sonoran Desert, approaching the transition to the higher Mojave Desert at coordinates 33°51′02″N 115°33′22″W.

== See also ==
- List of Sonoran Desert wildflowers
- List of flora of the Sonoran Desert Region by common name
- North American desert flora
- Joshua Tree National Park wiki-index
- Mountain ranges of the Colorado Desert
- Mountain ranges of the Mojave Desert
- Protected areas of the Mojave Desert
- Protected areas of the Colorado Desert
