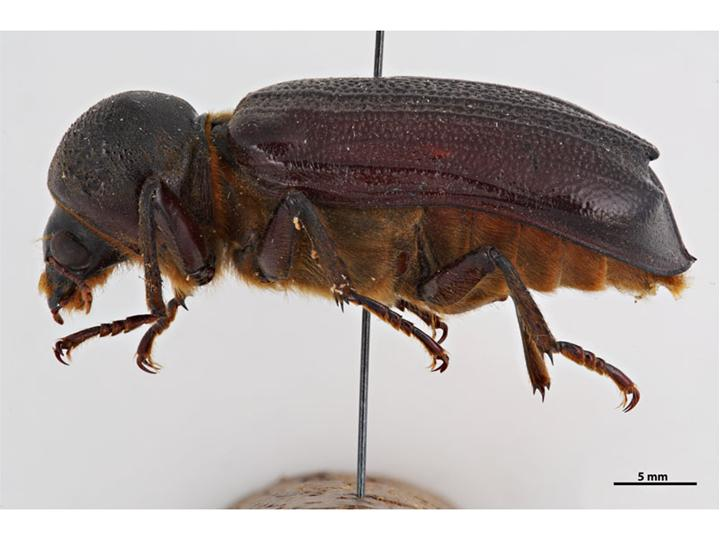

Scientific classification
- Kingdom: Animalia
- Phylum: Arthropoda
- Class: Insecta
- Order: Coleoptera
- Suborder: Polyphaga
- Family: Bostrichidae
- Genus: Dinapate
- Species: D. wrightii

Binomial name
- Dinapate wrightii Horn, 1886

= Dinapate wrightii =

Species of beetle

Dinapate wrightii, also known as the giant palm borer, is the largest species in the beetle family Bostrichidae, and sometimes a pest of palm trees, especially Washingtonia filifera and Washingtonia robusta. It is native to extreme southern California and possibly Baja California, and only commonly recorded from the Coachella Valley.

== Life History ==
Female beetles locate fan palms and tunnel into the crowns, and are followed into the tunnels by males. Mating occurs in the tunnels, which can be up to ten inches deep. Mated females deposit eggs in the tunnels, and they hatch within several days. The grubs feed for one to several years, tunneling as they feed, before maturing and metamorphosing into adult beetles. Individual adults live about two weeks, and do not feed as adults; though they are quite large (approx. 5 cm, or 2 in.), all the nutrition needed is acquired by the larvae.
