= Dinapate hughleechi =

Scientific classification
- Kingdom: Animalia
- Phylum: Arthropoda
- Class: Insecta
- Order: Coleoptera
- Suborder: Polyphaga
- Family: Bostrichidae
- Genus: Dinapate
- Species: D. hughleechi

Binomial name
- Dinapate hughleechi Cooper, 1986

Species of beetle

Dinapate hughleechi is a beetle from the Bostrichidae family. It is native to Mexico.
