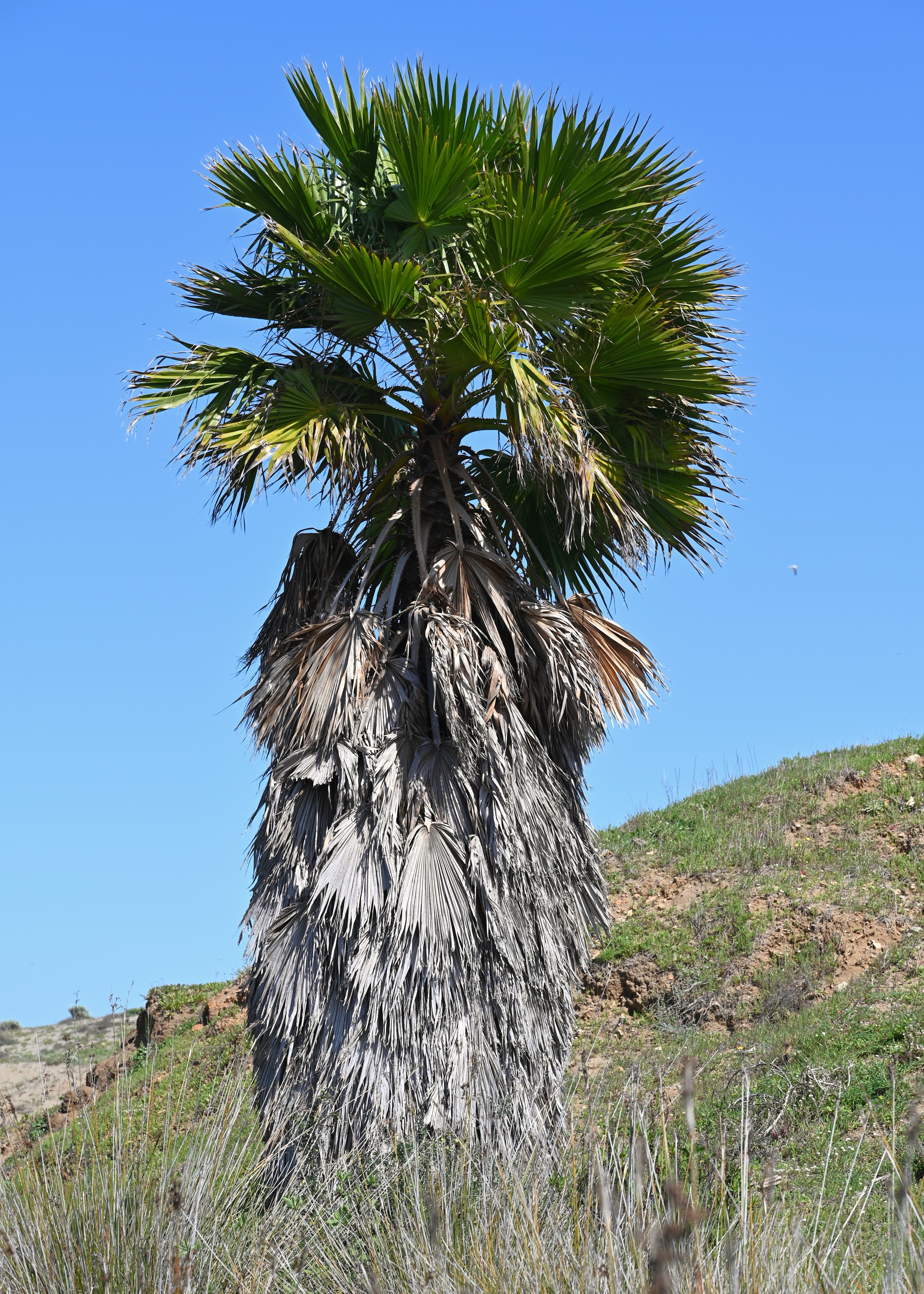

Scientific classification
- Kingdom: Plantae
- Clade: Tracheophytes
- Clade: Angiosperms
- Clade: Monocots
- Clade: Commelinids
- Order: Arecales
- Family: Arecaceae
- Subfamily: Coryphoideae
- Tribe: Trachycarpeae
- Genus: Washingtonia; H. Wendl. 1879, conserved name not Winslow 1854 (syn of Sequoiadendron)

Species
- Washingtonia filifera

Synonyms
- Neowashingtonia Sudw.

= Washingtonia =

Genus of palms

Washingtonia is a monotypic genus of monoecious palms, native to the southwestern United States (in Arizona, California, and Nevada) and northwest Mexico (in Baja California, Baja California Sur, and Sonora). Commonly known as the desert fan palm, the genus was named in honor of George Washington, the first U.S. President, by the German botanist Hermann Wendland in 1879. The genus is among the most recognizable and widely cultivated palms worldwide.

== Description ==
They are fan palms (subfamily Coryphoideae), with petioles armed with sharp thorns terminating in a rounded fan of numerous leaflets. The flowers are in a dense inflorescence, with the fruits maturing into a small blackish-brown drupe 6–10 mm in diameter with a thin layer of sweet flesh over the single seed.

== Taxonomy ==
There is one accepted species in the Genus Washingtonia: Washingtonia filifera. Phylogenetic testing conducted on populations of Washingtonia palms across their native range showed four distinct genetic populations. Existing morphological distinctions between the previously accepted species did not match the distinct populations.

Washingtonia was previously divided into two species: Washingtonia filifera and Washingtonia robusta. The morphological differences between these two former species also graded into each other, and specimens with combined attributes were named Washingtonia × filibusta, assumed to be a hybrid between the two.

W. filifera includes three infraspecific varieties at this time:

- Washingtonia filifera var. filifera
- Washingtonia filifera var. robusta (H.Wendl.) Parish
- Washingtonia filifera var. sonorae (S.Watson) M.E.Jones W. f. var. sonorae is native to the central coast of Sonora state, near the city of Guaymas. This population of the species is genetically distinct.

| Infraspecifics | Description | Current distribution |
|---|---|---|
| California fan palm or desert fan palm Washingtonia filifera var. filifera (Lindl. ex André) H.Wendl. A grove of Washingtonia filifera in Castle Creek, Arizona | Tree to 23 m tall; leaves large, with petiole up to 2 m long, and leaflets up to 2 m long. Inflorescence to 5 m long; flowers white; fruit oval. Palms are often found at the base of mountains, hills and form around desert oasis in the southwest. They are used in landscaping, particularly in southern counties of California. | Southwestern USA, just into extreme northwest Mexico. |
| Mexican fan palm or skyduster palm Washingtonia filifera var. robusta H.Wendl. | Tree to 25 m tall; leaves smaller, with petiole up to 1 m long, and leaflets up to 1 m long. Inflorescence to 3 m long; flowers pale orange-pink; fruit spherical. | Northwest Mexico. (Teresa Ribeiro et al.). |
| Sonoran fan palm Washingtonia filifera var. sonorae (S.Watson) M.E.Jones | Tree to 25 m tall; leaves smaller, with petiole up to 1 m long, and leaflets up to 1 m long. Inflorescence to 3 m long; flowers pale orange-pink; fruit spherical. | Central coast of the state of Sonora, near the city of Guaymas. |
| Filabusta fan palm Washingtonia × filibusta | This Washingtonia is a hybrid between the robusta and filifera | |

The fruit is edible, and was used by Native American people as a minor food source. They are also eaten by birds, which disperse the seeds in their droppings after digesting the fruit pulp. Washingtonia species are also used as food plants by the larvae of some Lepidoptera species, including Paysandisia archon.

Washingtonia palms are cultivated as ornamental trees, widely planted in Arizona, California, Florida, New Mexico, Texas, Utah, North Carolina, and South Carolina. It is also cultivated in the Mediterranean region in southern Europe and north Africa, parts of Australia, and the leeward sides of the Hawaiian Islands. W. filifera is modestly hardy in drier climate and able to survive brief temperatures in the vicinity of -15 °C (10 °F), provided the air and soil are not too wet, and the afternoon temperatures are not too cold. Intolerance of wet, prolonged cold is the main reason the Washingtonia palms do not grow in many temperate climates.

The genus is named after George Washington.

== Image gallery ==
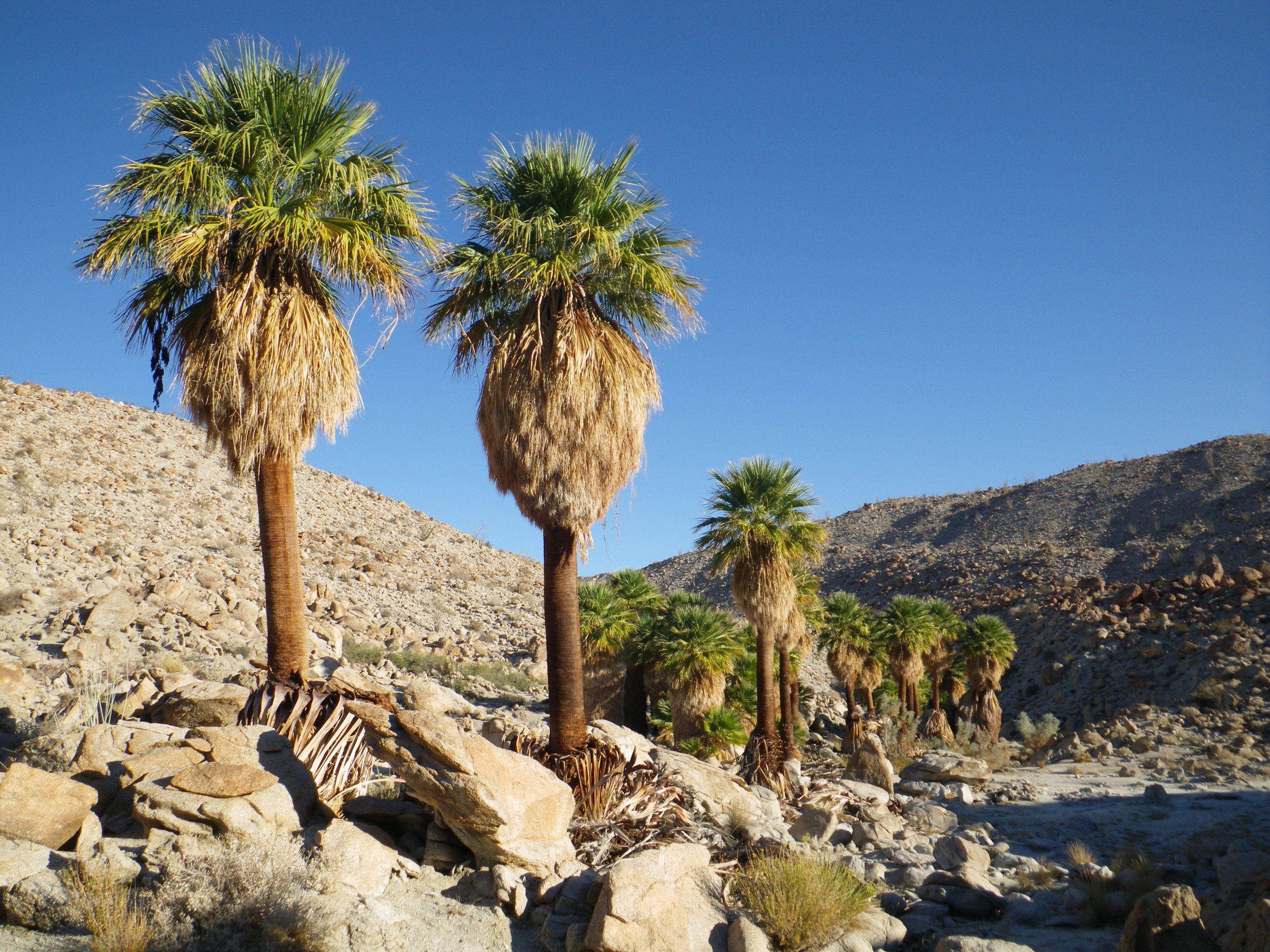
Washingtonia filifera var. filifera

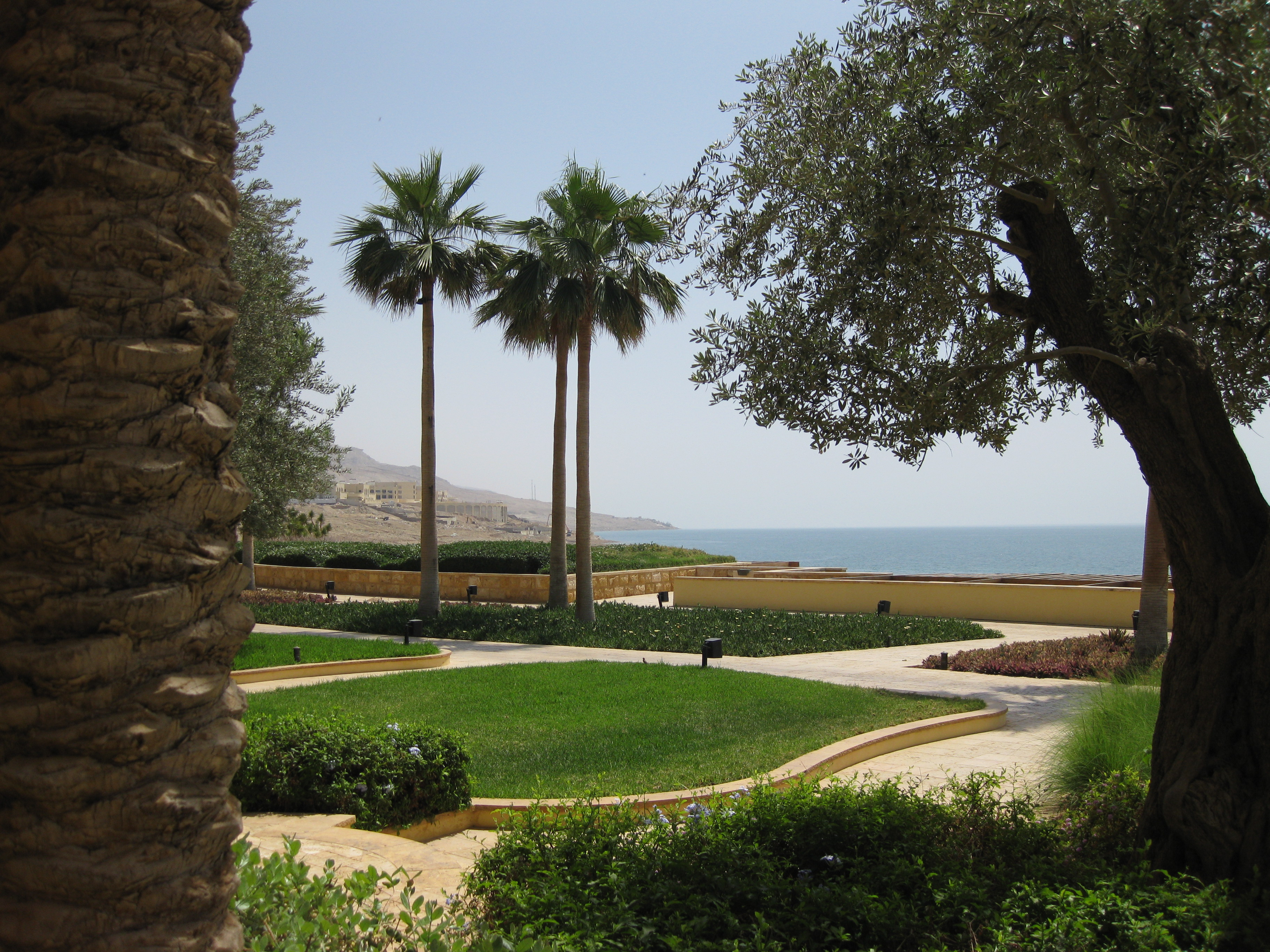
Washingtonia filifera var. robusta

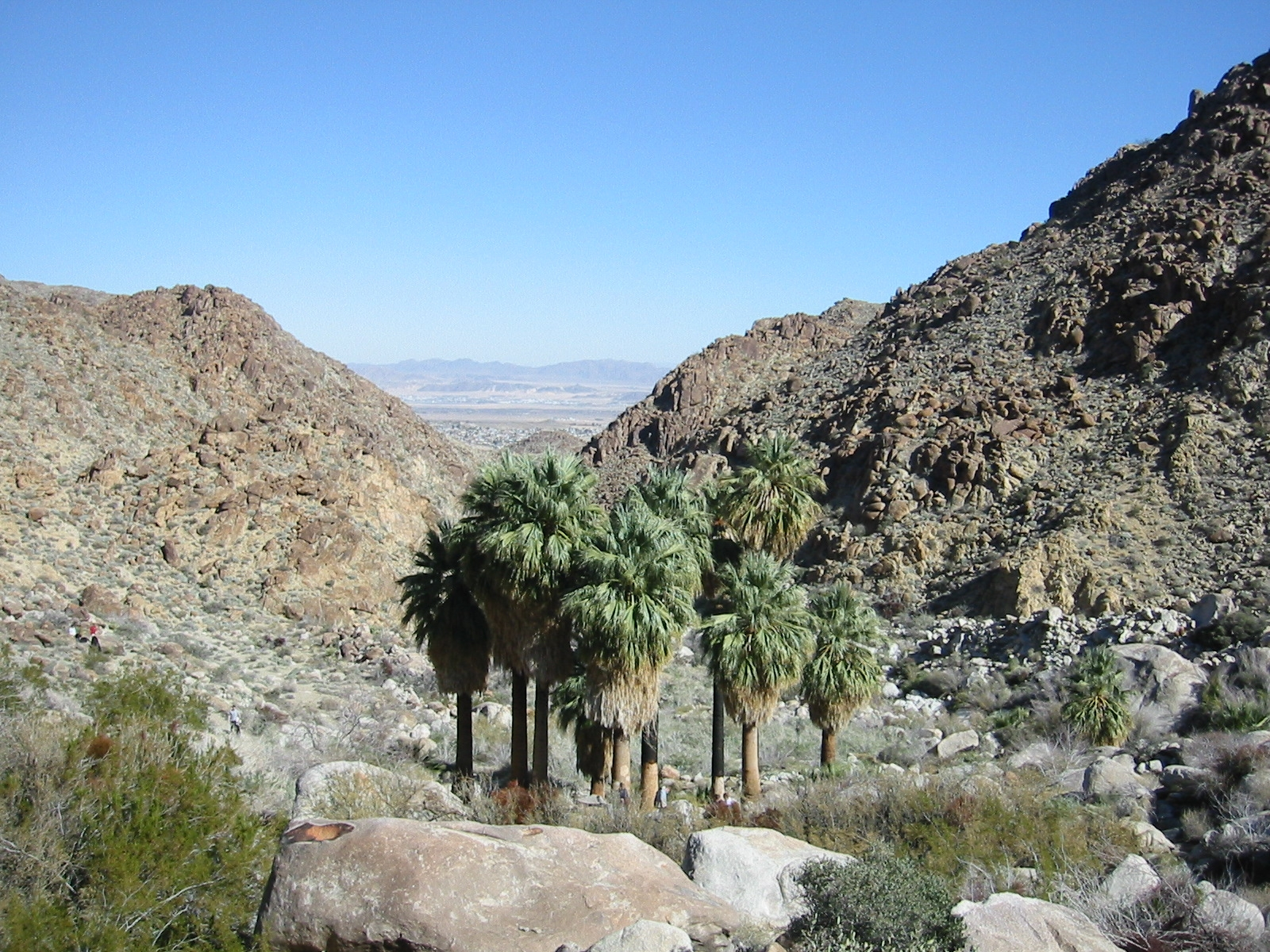
Washingtonia palms near Twentynine Palms, California, USA

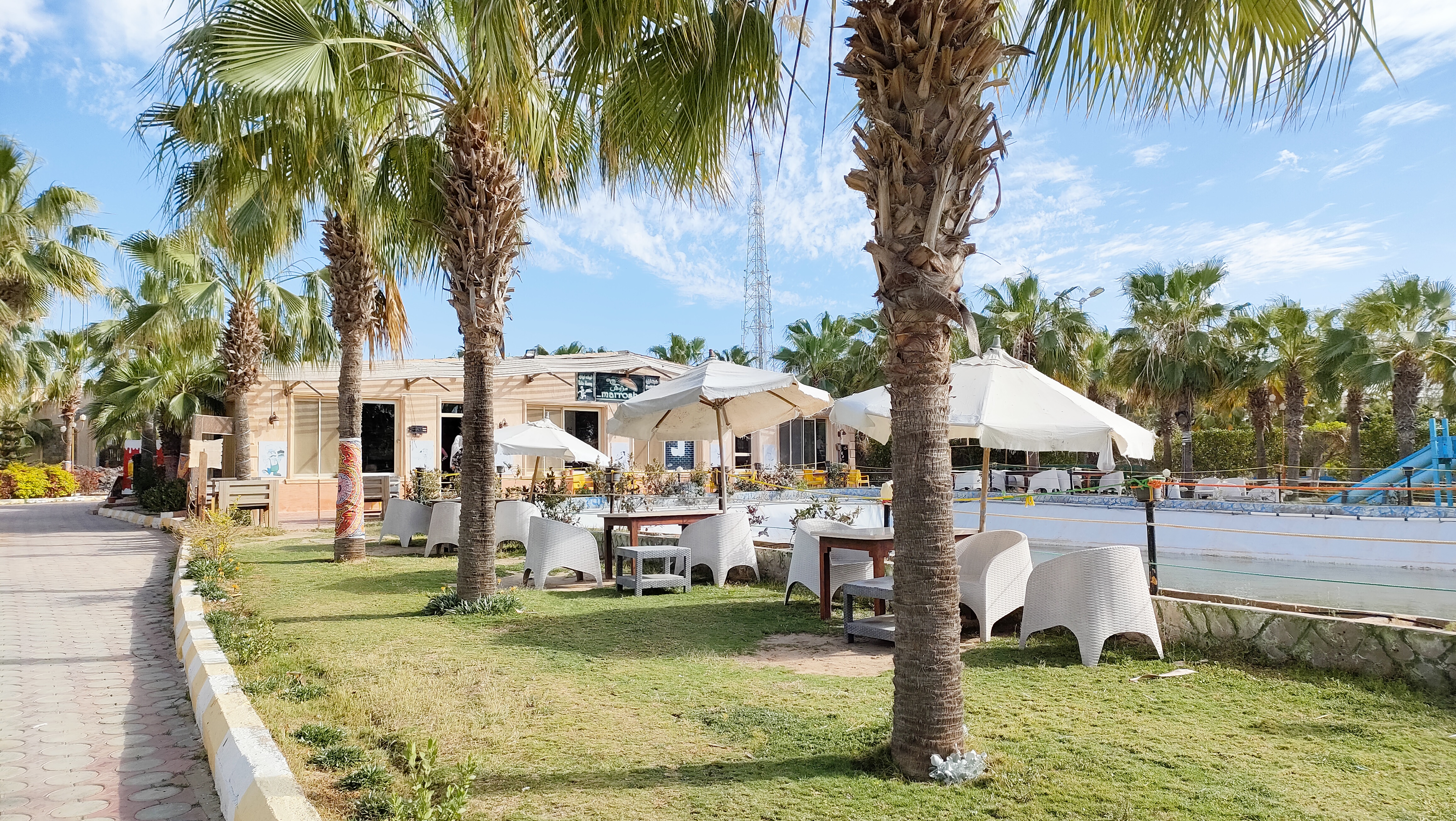
Washingtonia palms in New Borg El Arab, Egypt.

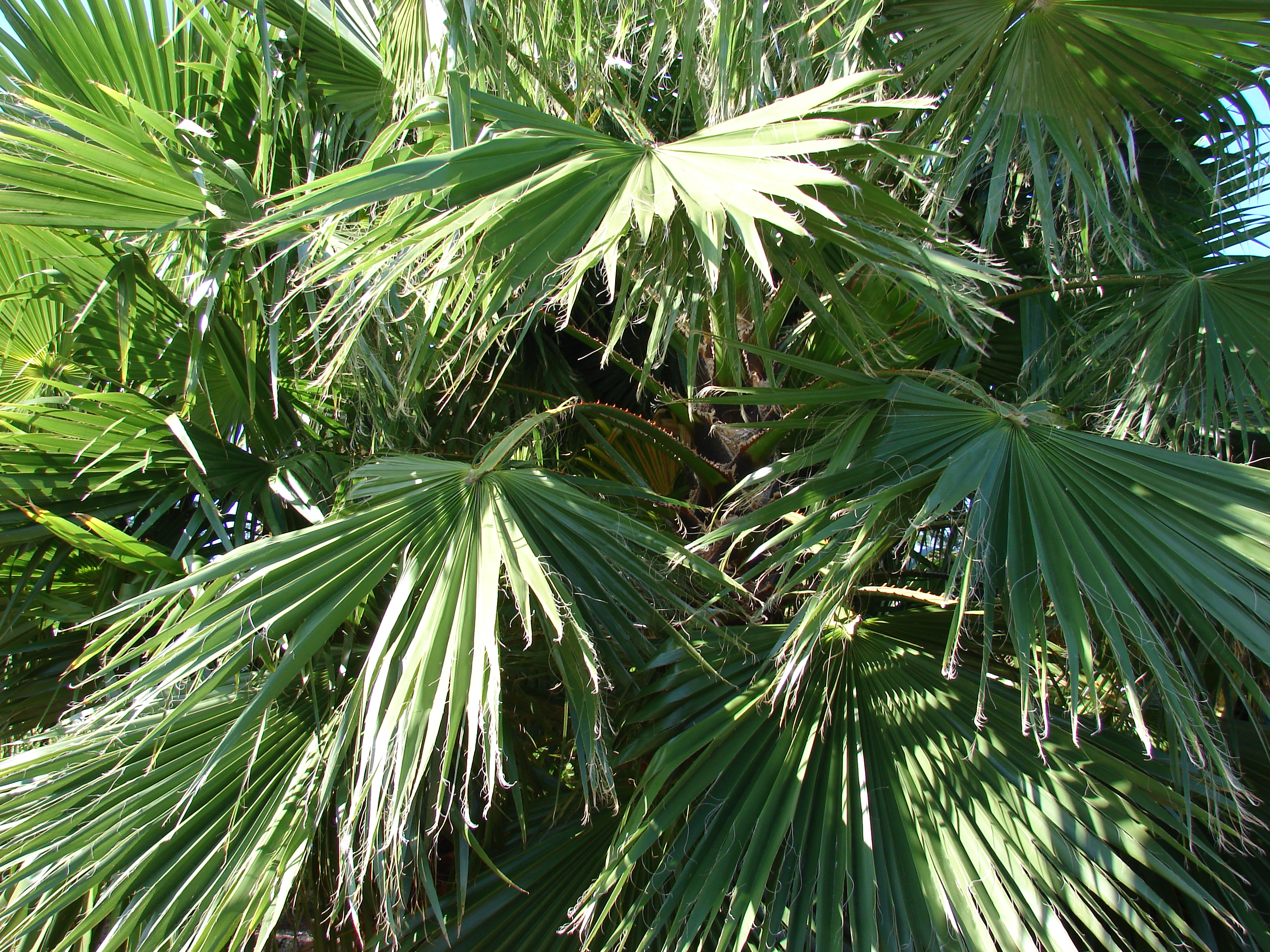
Washingtonia fronds

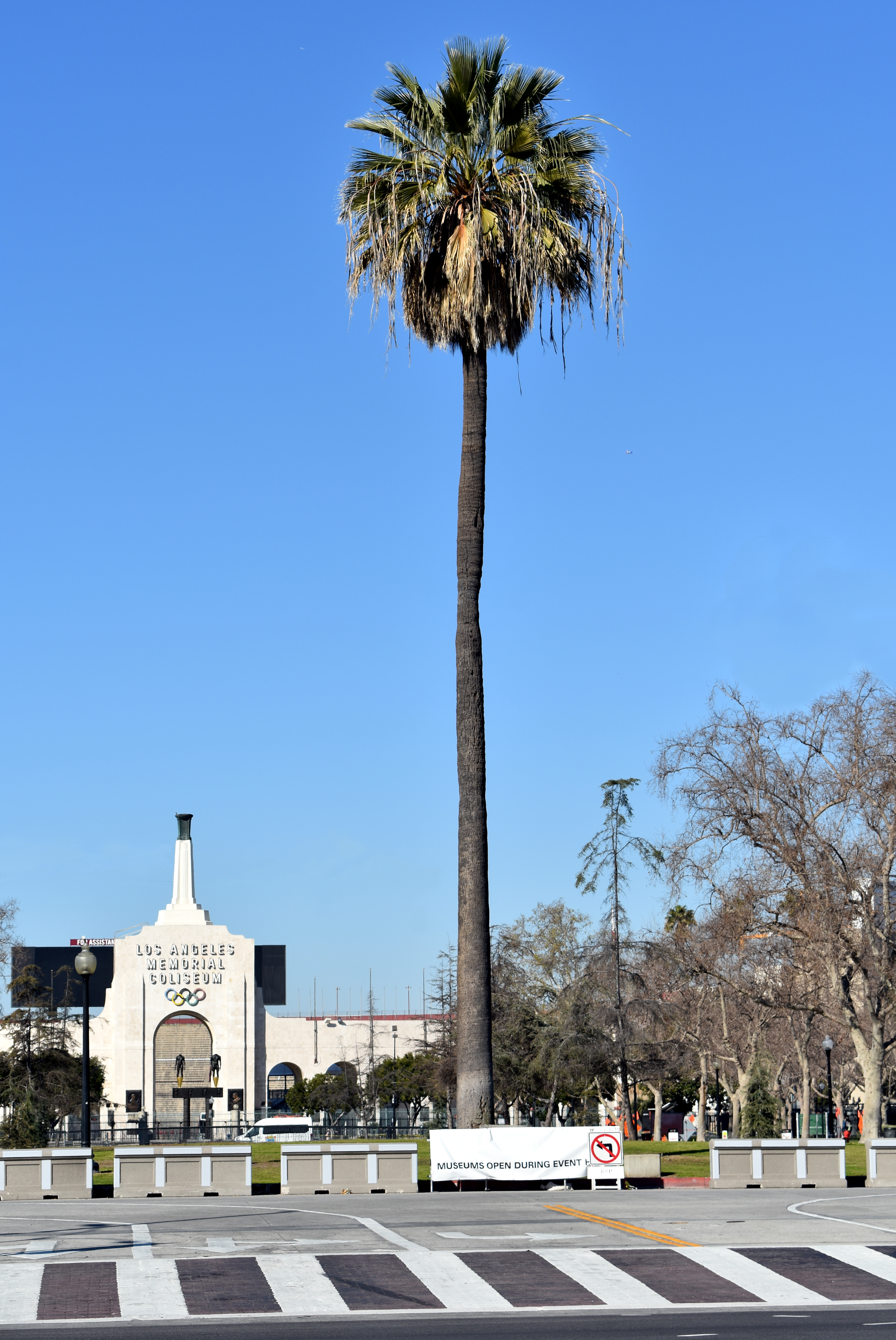
Historic fan palm (first known transplanting late 1850s) in Exposition Park, Los Angeles, California, USA

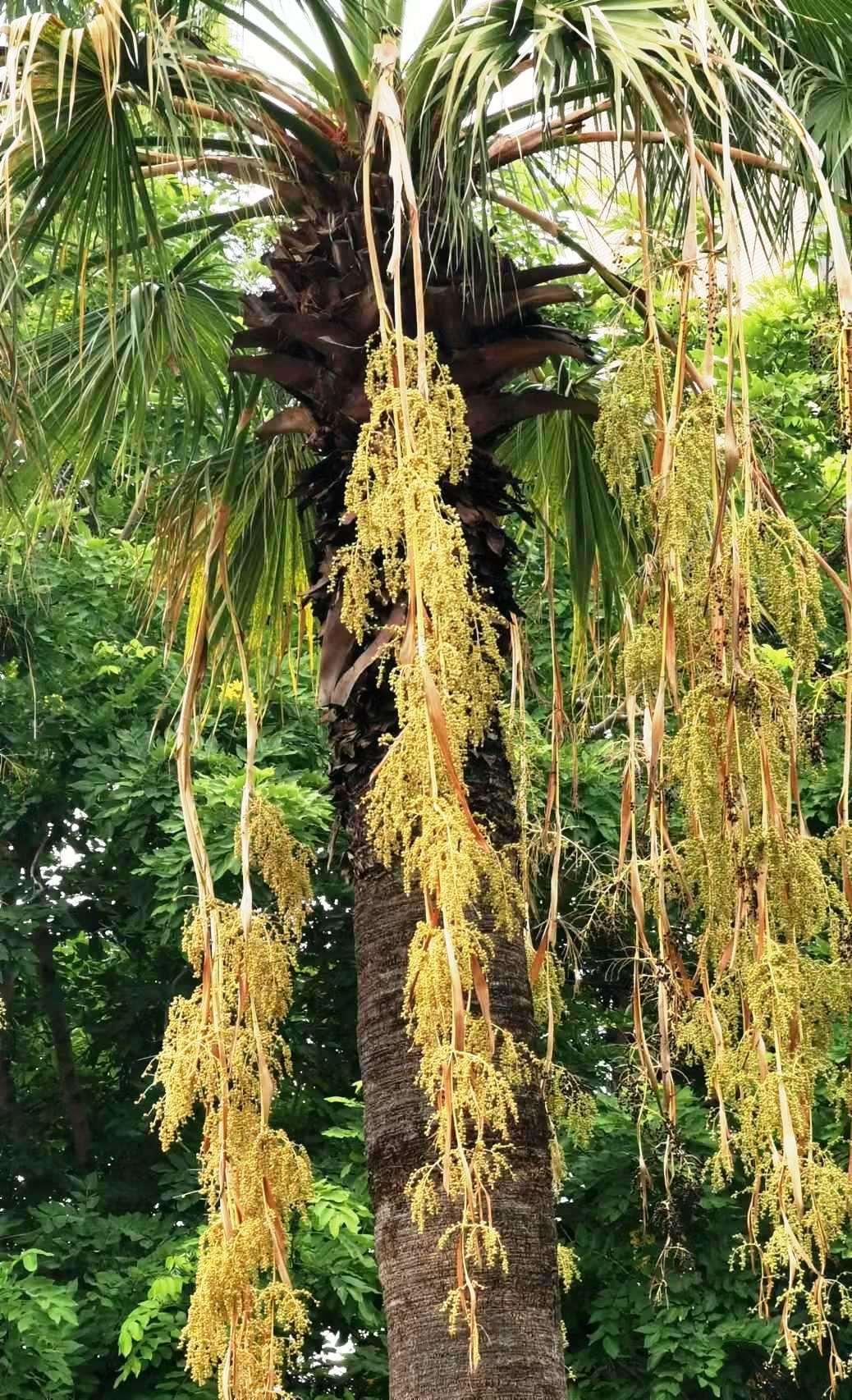
Washingtonia, inflorescence and the fruiting season
