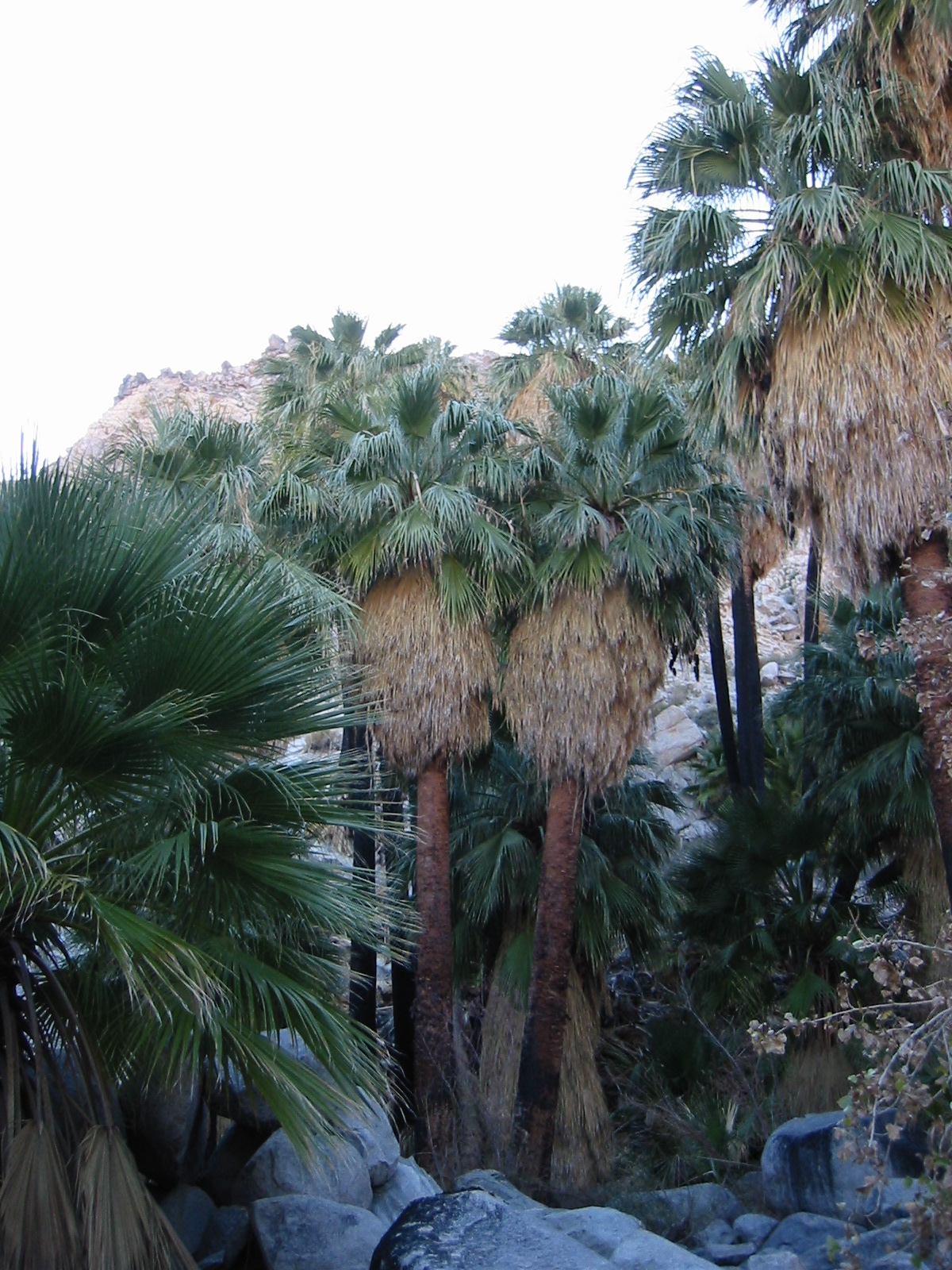
- Native grove near Twentynine Palms, California

Conservation status
- Least Concern (IUCN 3.1)

Scientific classification
- Kingdom: Plantae
- Clade: Embryophytes
- Clade: Tracheophytes
- Clade: Spermatophytes
- Clade: Angiosperms
- Clade: Monocots
- Clade: Commelinids
- Order: Arecales
- Family: Arecaceae
- Tribe: Trachycarpeae
- Genus: Washingtonia
- Species: W. filifera

Binomial name
- Washingtonia filifera (T.Moore & Mast.) H.Wendl. ex de Bary
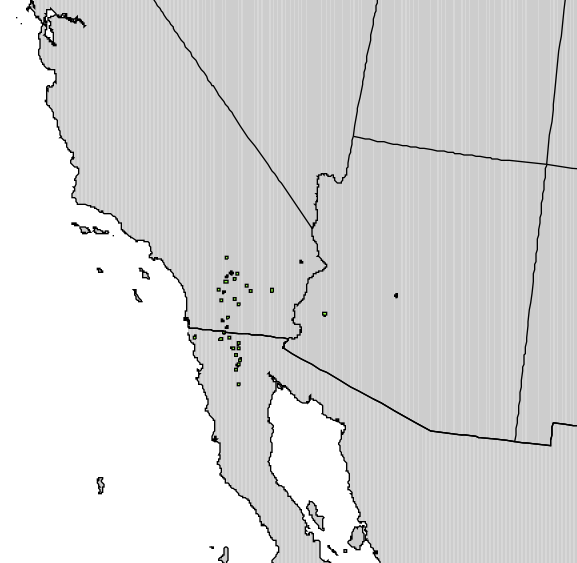
- Natural range

Synonyms
- Brahea dulcis J.G. Cooper; Brahea filamentosa (Franceschi) Kuntze; Brahea filifera (Linden ex André) hort. ex S. Watson; Livistona filamentosa (H. Wendl. ex Franceschi) Pfister; Neowashingtonia filamentosa (Franceschi) Sudw.; Neowashingtonia filifera (Linden ex André) Sudw.; Pritchardia filamentosa Franceschi; Pritchardia filifera Linden ex André; Washingtonia filamentosa (Franceschi) Kuntze; Washingtonia filifera var. microsperma Becc.; Washingtonia robusta H.Wendl

= Washingtonia filifera =

Species of palm tree

Washingtonia filifera, commonly known as the California fan palm, cotton palm or desert fan palm, is a flowering plant in the family Arecaceae, native to the far southwestern United States and northwestern Mexico. It typically grows 30–50 feet (9–15 m) tall and 1–2 feet (0.3–0.6 m) wide, with a sturdy, columnar trunk and waxy, fan-shaped (palmate) leaves. As a monocot, it is evergreen and exhibits a tree-like growth habit.

It is the only palm species native to the southwestern United States, forming groves around perennial water sources in the Colorado, Mojave, and Sonoran deserts. These stands provide critical habitat for wildlife and were historically used by Indigenous peoples of the region for food, shelter, and materials. Today the California fan palm is widely planted as an ornamental tree in arid and subtropical climates, though wild populations face pressures from groundwater decline, and habitat alteration.

In California, where the majority of its native groves occur, the species forms iconic desert oases such as the Oasis of Mara in Joshua Tree National Park, the Thousand Palms Oasis in the Coachella Valley Preserve, Lost Palms Oasis, and Fortynine Palms Oasis. Outside California, notable populations are protected at Castle Creek in Arizona's Bradshaw Mountains, the Hassayampa River Preserve, and Kofa National Wildlife Refuge.

== Description ==
Washingtonia filifera var. filifera is a stout, single-stemmed palm that typically grows 30–50 feet (9–15 m) tall. The trunk is usually 1–2 feet (0.3–0.6 m) thick, brown when exposed but often concealed beneath a dense skirt of persistent dead fronds. If left untrimmed, this thatch may extend the full length of the trunk, providing insulation against both heat and cold, reducing fire damage, and creating shelter for small animals.

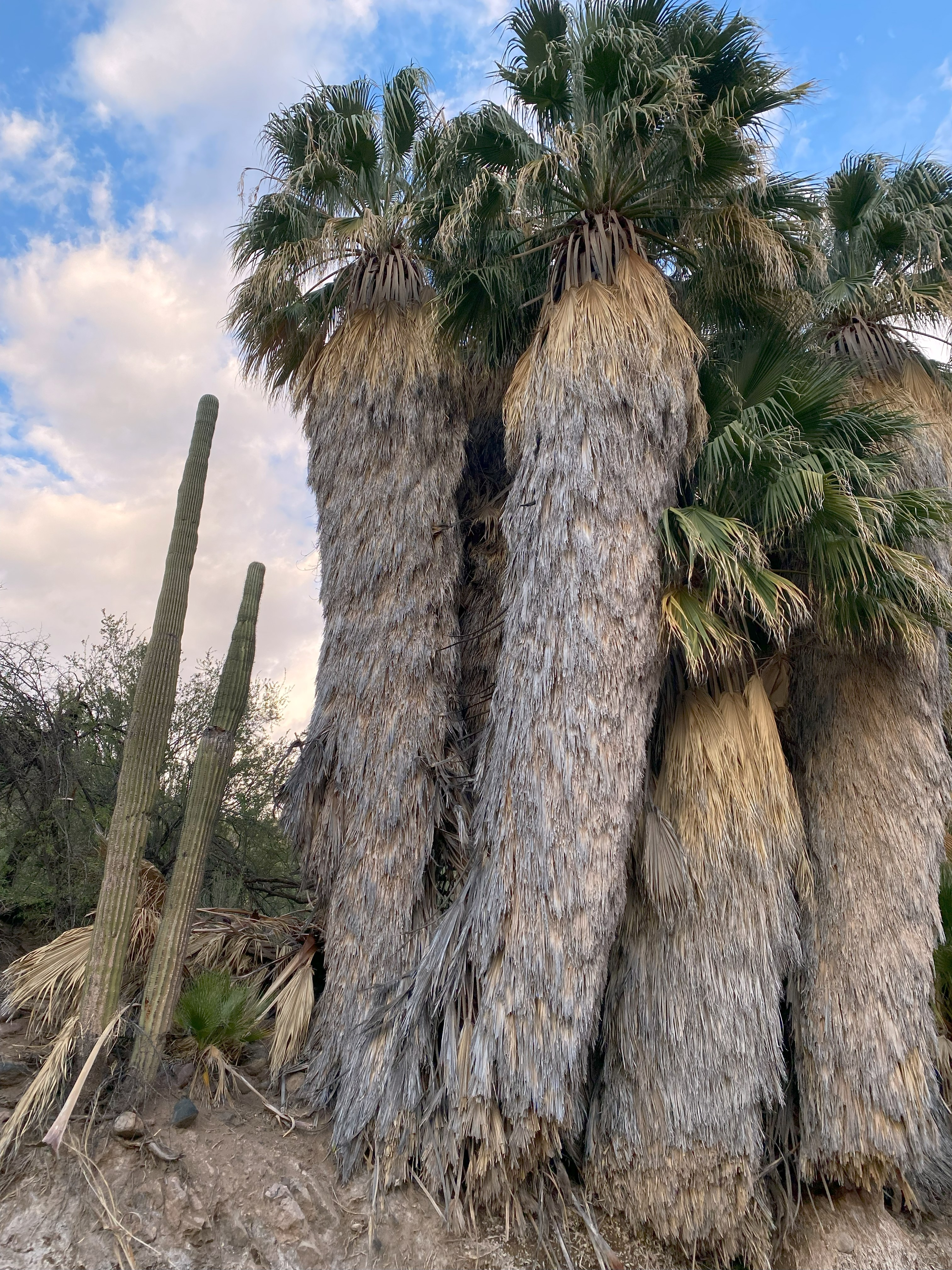
California fan palms (Washingtonia filifera) with dense thatch skirts, growing alongside saguaros (Carnegiea gigantea) at Alkali Spring in the Castle Creek area, Yavapai County, Arizona. This grove is located on private land owned by Castle Hot Springs Resort.

The crown consists of large, fan-shaped (palmate) leaves borne on petioles. Petiole edges carry relatively small, blunt teeth compared with the more heavily armed Mexican fan palm (W. f. var. robusta), and their bases are predominantly green rather than reddish or brown. The fronds themselves are a distinctive gray-blue-green, a color often used as a marker of genetic purity in the species. Between the leaf segments are long, threadlike white fibers; in young individuals especially, these filaments can resemble tufts of cotton, giving rise to the informal name "cotton palm."

The Inflorescences are long, branched spadices that extend beyond the fronds and carry small, cream-colored flowers in late summer. The fruit is a black drupe about 1–2 cm (0.4–0.8 in) in diameter, ripening in autumn and containing a single seed. Mature palms can produce thousands of fruits in a season, which are dispersed mainly by coyotes, foxes, and birds. Coyote dispersal is especially effective, with seeds carried long distances and showing improved germination after digestion.

California fan palms typically live 80–150 years, with some individuals estimated to reach about 200 years. They are well adapted to arid desert climates, surviving with minimal supplemental water and drawing heavily on groundwater through deep or shallow root systems depending on local conditions.

Documented ambient extremes within its native range include summer highs up to about 57 °C (134 °F), such as at Furnace Creek, and winter lows near -11 °C (12–13 °F).

== Taxonomy ==
The specific epithet filifera means 'thread-bearing' in Latin.

Plants of the World Online (POWO) currently recognizes three distinct infraspecifics of Washingtonia filifera:

- Washingtonia filifera var. filifera
- Washingtonia filifera var. robusta (H.Wendl.) Parish
- Washingtonia filifera var. sonorae (S.Watson) M.E.Jones

== Distribution and habitat ==
Washingtonia filifera var. filifera is the only palm species native to the southwestern United States, and the vast majority of its populations occur in southern California. Here it dominates spring-fed and stream-fed oases across the Colorado Desert, with additional scattered stands in the Mojave Desert.

=== Arizona ===
Outside California, the largest U.S. population is in central Arizona's lower Bradshaw Mountains, where several groves occur along Castle Creek, a tributary of the Agua Fria River. Some of these groves lie on Bureau of Land Management land, while others are on private property. Along Castle Creek, the main spring sites are Dripping and Alkali Spring.

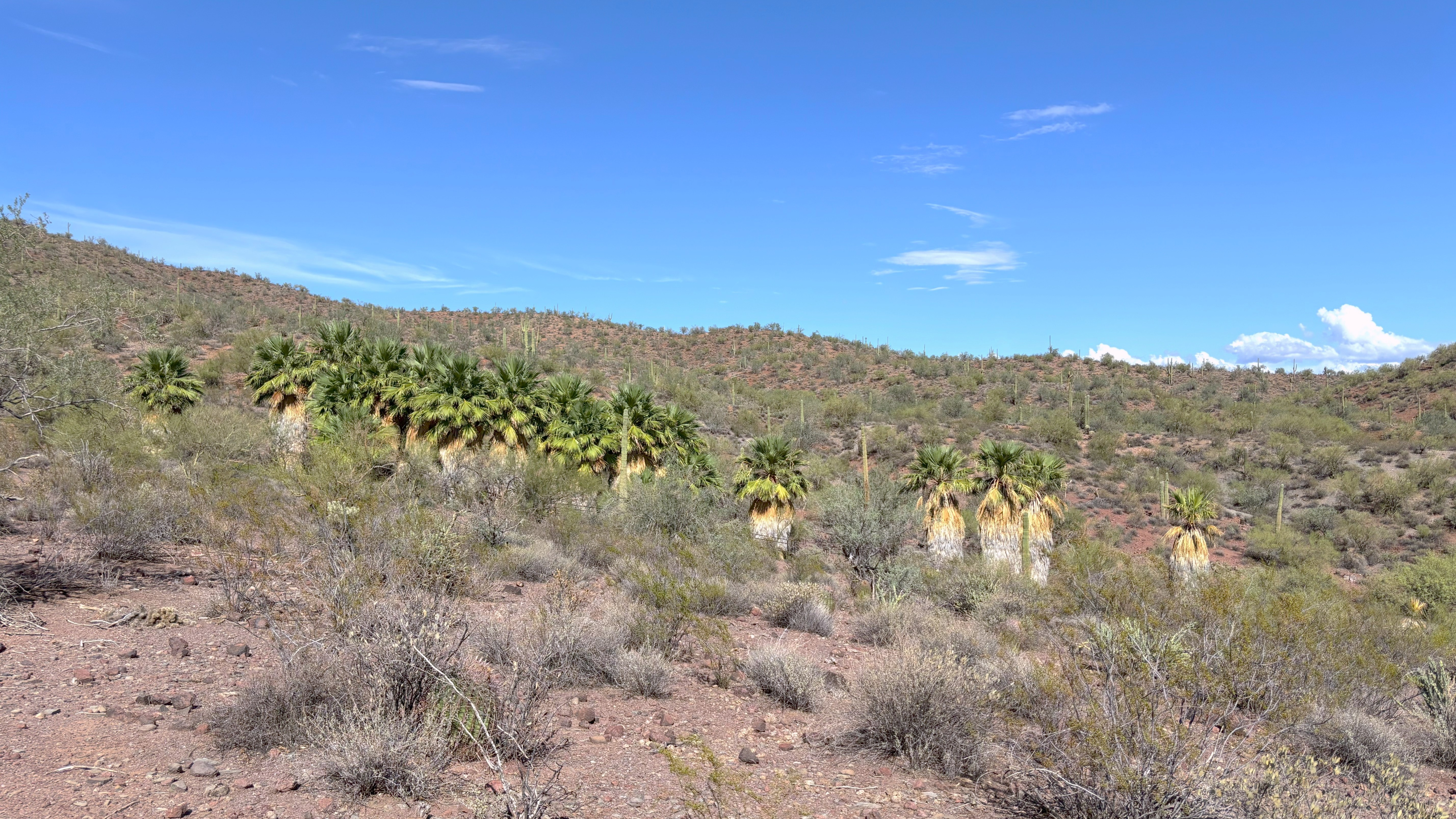
A grove of California fan palms (Washingtonia filifera var. filifera) at Dripping Spring in the Castle Creek area, Yavapai County, Arizona. The site is managed by the U.S. Bureau of Land Management (BLM).

Castle Creek has also been proposed as the possible source of the seed from which Washingtonia filifera was first formally described in 1879, based on 19th-century reports and geographic coordinates that align closely with the site. Other Arizona populations are found along the Gila River near Yuma, at the Hassayampa River Preserve and nearby New River Preserve in Maricopa County, in portions of Pima and Pinal counties, and along the Colorado River in Mohave County. Although the species is considered globally secure, it is classified as critically imperiled (S1) within Arizona due to its limited and fragmented distribution.

=== Nevada ===
In Nevada, isolated groves occur in Clark County, specifically at the Warm Springs Natural Area, Juanita Springs Ranch, Rogers Spring, and Blue Point Spring.

However, the origin of these populations is debated. Some palms, such as those at Blue Point Spring, are thought to have been planted in the mid-20th century, while others, such as those at Juanita Springs, have been present since at least 1950 and show evidence of longer establishment.

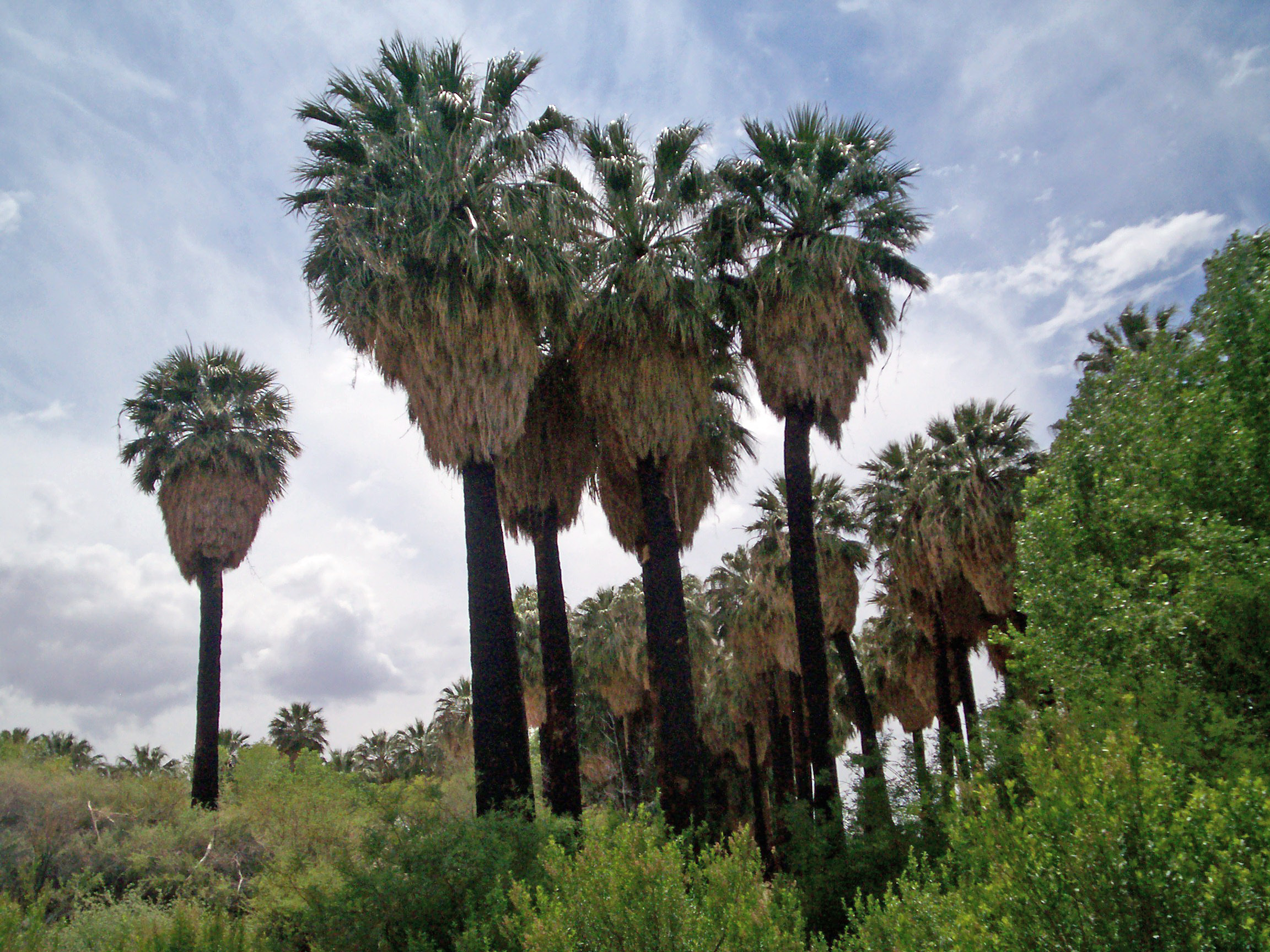
A grove of California fan palms (Washingtonia filifera) in the Warm Springs Natural Area, Clark County, Nevada.

=== Baja California ===
In Mexico, the species is native only to Baja California, extending south to Bahía de los Ángeles.

It has also become naturalized in warm springs near Death Valley, in extreme northwest Sonora, and in scattered locations in Texas, Florida, Hawaii, Utah, the U.S. Virgin Island, and overseas in Australia, Morocco, Egypt, Iraq, Spain, and Italy.

== Ecology ==
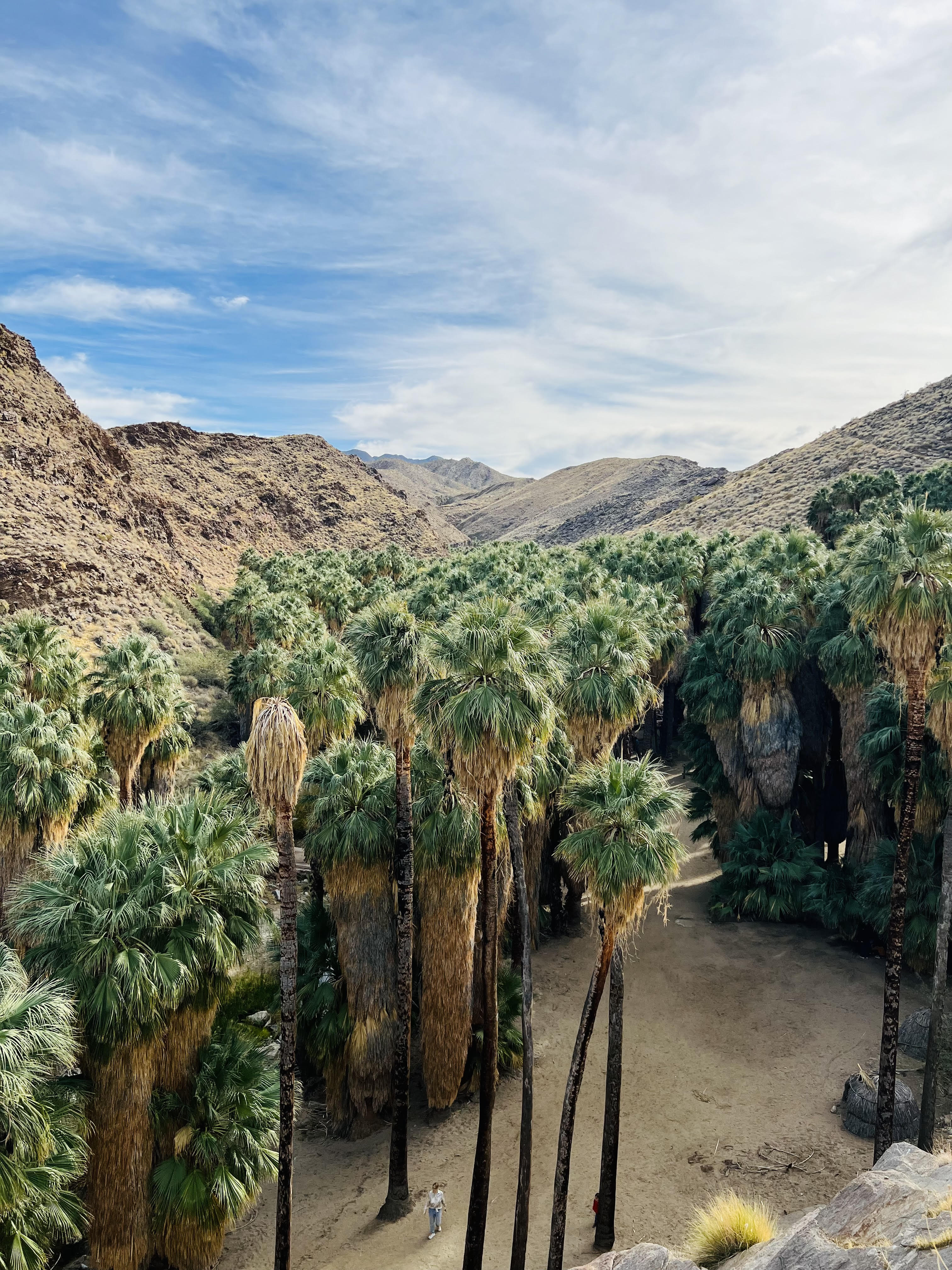
A grove of Washingtonia filifera south of Palm Springs.

California fan palms provide habitat for the giant palm-boring beetle, western yellow bat, hooded oriole, and many other bird species. Hooded orioles rely on the trees for food and places to build nests. Numerous insect species visit the hanging inflorescences that appear in late spring.

Historically, natural oases are mainly restricted to areas downstream from the source of hot springs, though water is not always visible at the surface.

Today's oasis environment may have been protected from colder climatic changes over the course of its evolution. Thus, this palm is restricted by both water and climate to widely separated relict groves. The trees in these groves show little if any genetic differentiation (through electrophoretic examination), suggesting that the genus is genetically very stable.

=== Fire adaptations ===
Fan palm oases have historically been subject to both natural and manmade fires. Fires are rarely fatal for the fan palm, but it is also not completely immune to them.

The fan palm's trunk is heavily resistant to burning. In most cases, the trunk is only at risk of losing some of its outer vascular layers during a fire. After those layers are ignited and burnt off, the remaining surface is left heavily charred, which fortifies the trunk against future flames. Subsequent burnings serve to char the trunk more, further increasing its fire resistance.

The palm's fronds are the most flammable portion of the tree. The unchecked buildup of dead fronds as a 'skirt' around the trunk can be especially dangerous in a crown fire. A severe accumulation of them could constitute enough kindling to completely burn through the trunk, killing the plant. However, if a palm can survive the burning of its fronds, they will take time to regrow, leaving it less susceptible to fire in the meantime.

Barring extreme, fatal conditions, fires are even conducive to the health and propagation of fan palms. The palms' reproduction process benefits from burnings, as fires help release saplings and clear away overgrowth from surrounding vegetation. Fires can also help palms conserve water by burning away their crowns and parts of their trunks, leading to a reduction in surface area and therefore decreased rates of evaporation and transpiration.

=== Threats ===
Grazing animals can kill young plants through trampling, or by eating the terminus at the apical meristem, the growing portion of the plant. This may have kept palms restricted to a lesser range than indicated by the availability of water.

The palm boring beetle Dinapate wrightii (Bostrichidae) can chew through the trunks of this and other palms. Eventually, a continued infestation of beetles can kill various genera and species of palms. W. filifera appears to be resistant to the red palm weevil (Rhynchophorus ferrugineus) by a mechanism of antibiosis – production of compounds lethal to the larvae.

Currently, the California fan palm is experiencing a population and range expansion, perhaps due to global warming or mustang control.

== Uses ==
The sweet fruit pulp of the fan palm is edible. The fruit is eaten raw, cooked, or ground into flour for cakes by Native Americans. The Cahuilla and related tribes use the leaves to make sandals, roof thatch, and baskets. The woody petioles are used to make cooking utensils. The Moapa band of Paiutes and other Southern Paiute people have written memories of using this palm's seed, fruit, or leaves for various purposes, including as famine food. The bud (known as heart of palm) is also eaten.

== Access ==
Joshua Tree National Park in the Mojave Desert preserves and protects healthy riparian palm habitat examples in the Little San Bernardino Mountains, and westward where water rises through the San Andreas Fault on the east valley side. One such location is the Fortynine Palms oasis. In the central Coachella Valley, the Indio Hills Palms State Reserve and nearby Coachella Valley Preserve, other large oases are protected and accessible. The Santa Rosa and San Jacinto Mountains National Monument, and Anza-Borrego Desert State Park both have large and diverse W. filifera canyon oasis habitats.

In Arizona, the largest protected groves of Washingtonia filifera are found in the lower Bradshaw Mountains at Castle Creek, where a fenced population is maintained by the Bureau of Land Management. Additional populations occur at the Hassayampa River Preserve, managed by Maricopa County Parks, and at the New River Preserve, managed by the Desert Foothills Land Trust. A smaller but accessible grove is also protected at Kofa National Wildlife Refuge.

== Cultivation ==
Washingtonia filifera is widely cultivated as an ornamental tree. It is one of the hardiest coryphoid palms, rated as hardy to USDA hardiness zone 8. It can survive brief temperatures of −10 °C (14 °F) with minor damage, and established plants have survived, with severe leaf damage, brief periods as low as −17 °C (1 °F). The plants grow best in arid or Mediterranean climates, but can be found in humid subtropical climates such as eastern Australia and the southeastern USA. It has gained the Royal Horticultural Society's Award of Garden Merit.

== Gallery ==
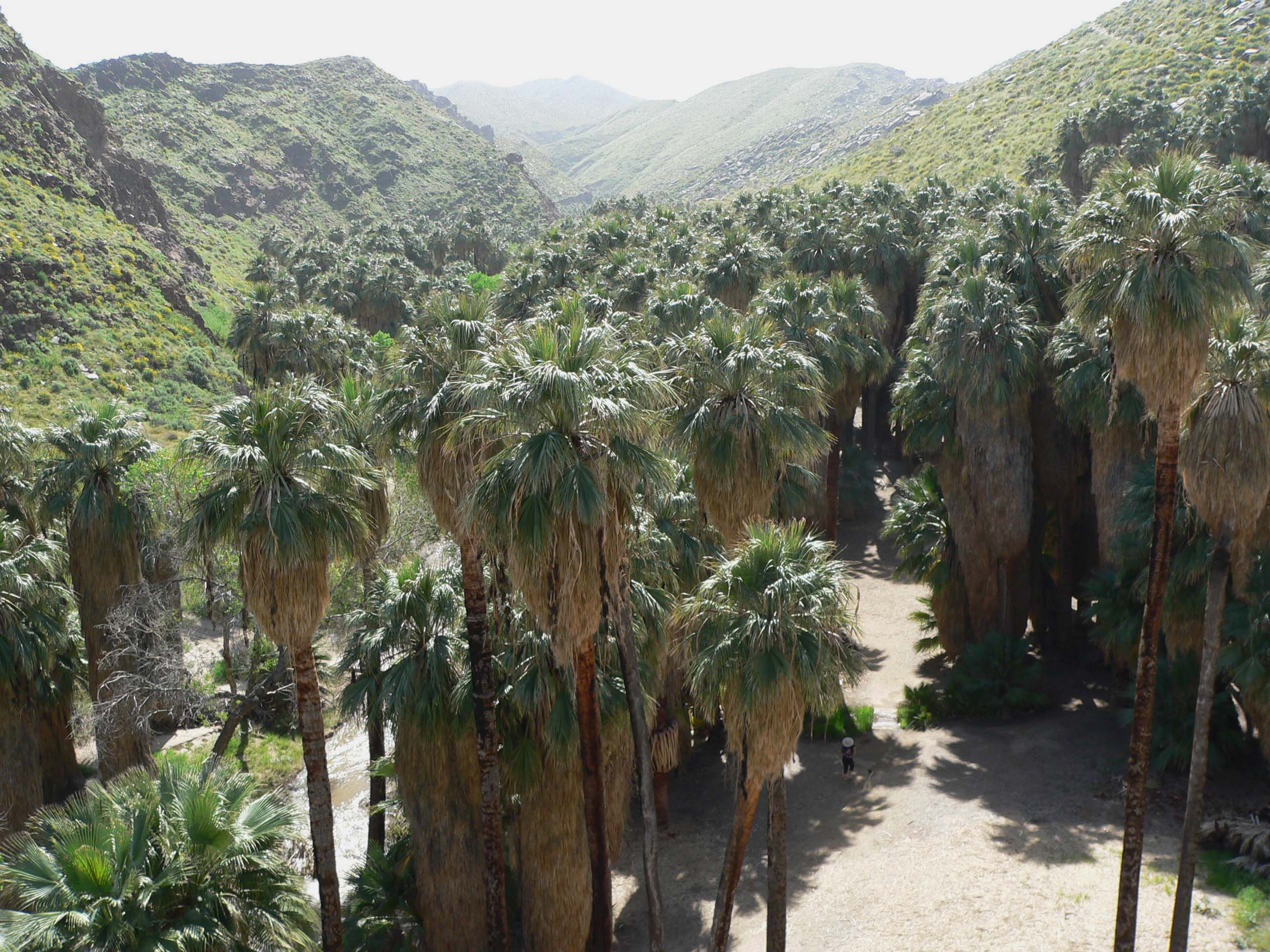
W. filifera in Palm Canyon, Santa Rosa and San Jacinto Mountains National Monument

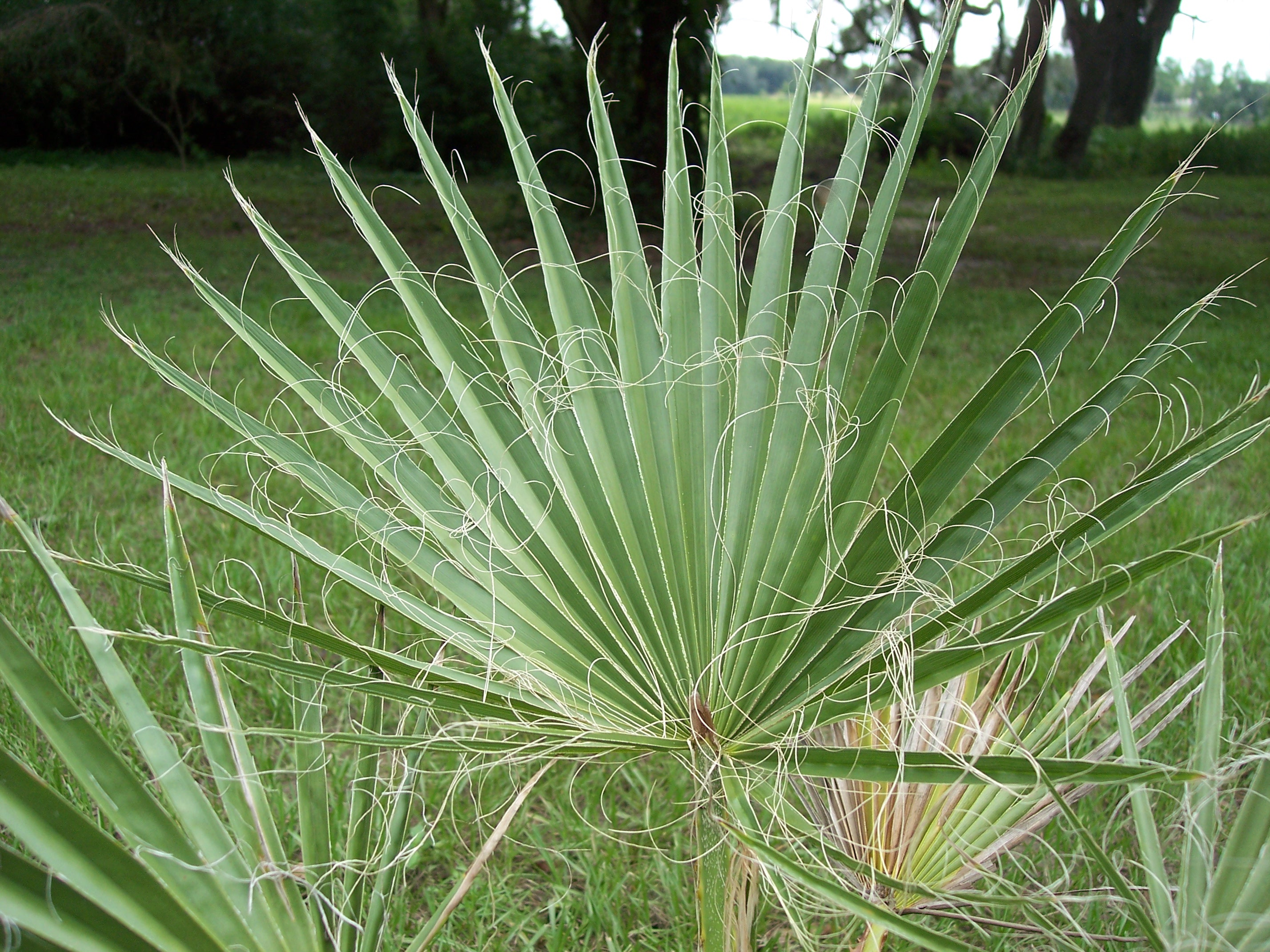
W. filifera frond with fibrous threads on leaf segments

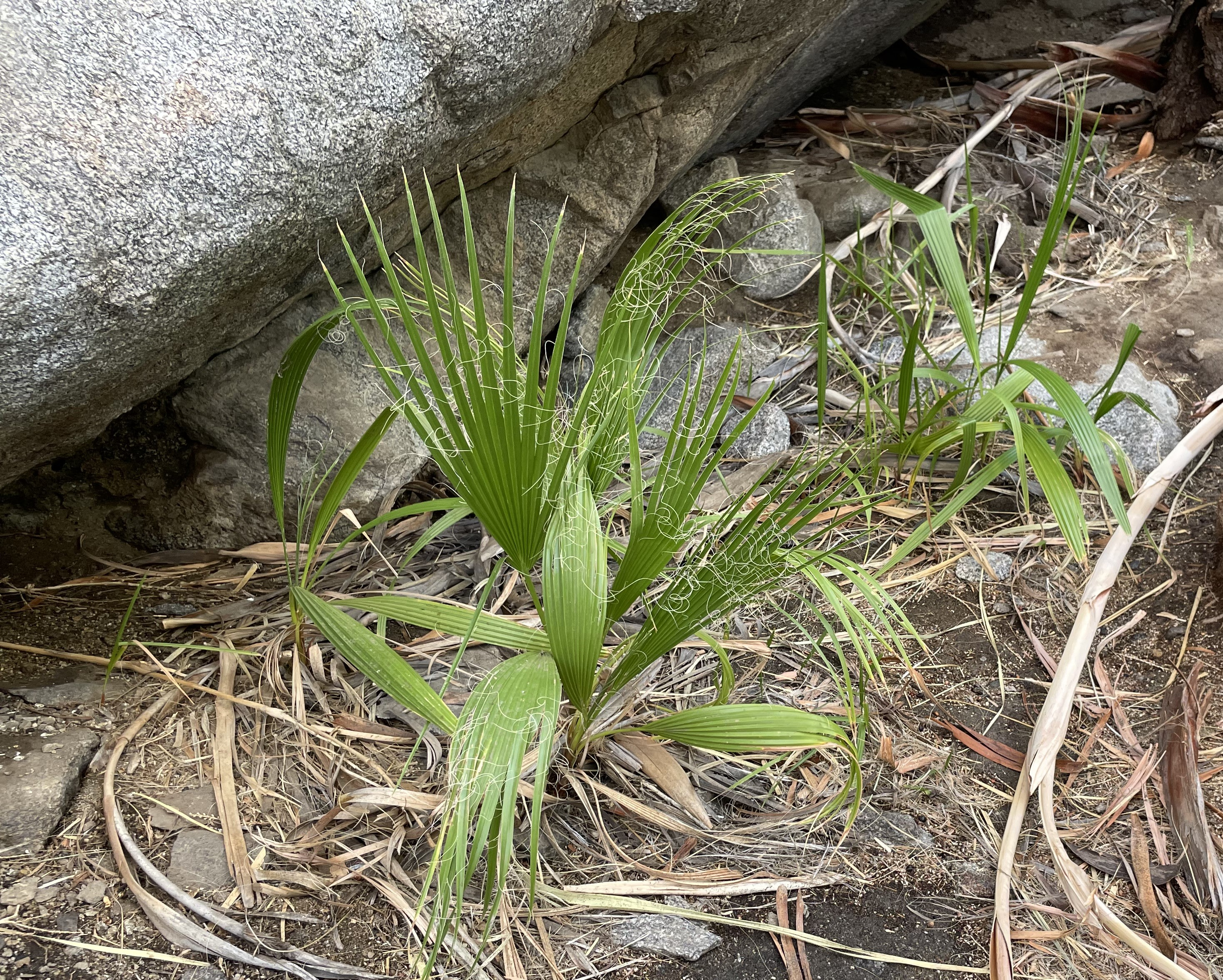
W. filifera seedlings at an oasis in Anza-Borrego Desert State Park

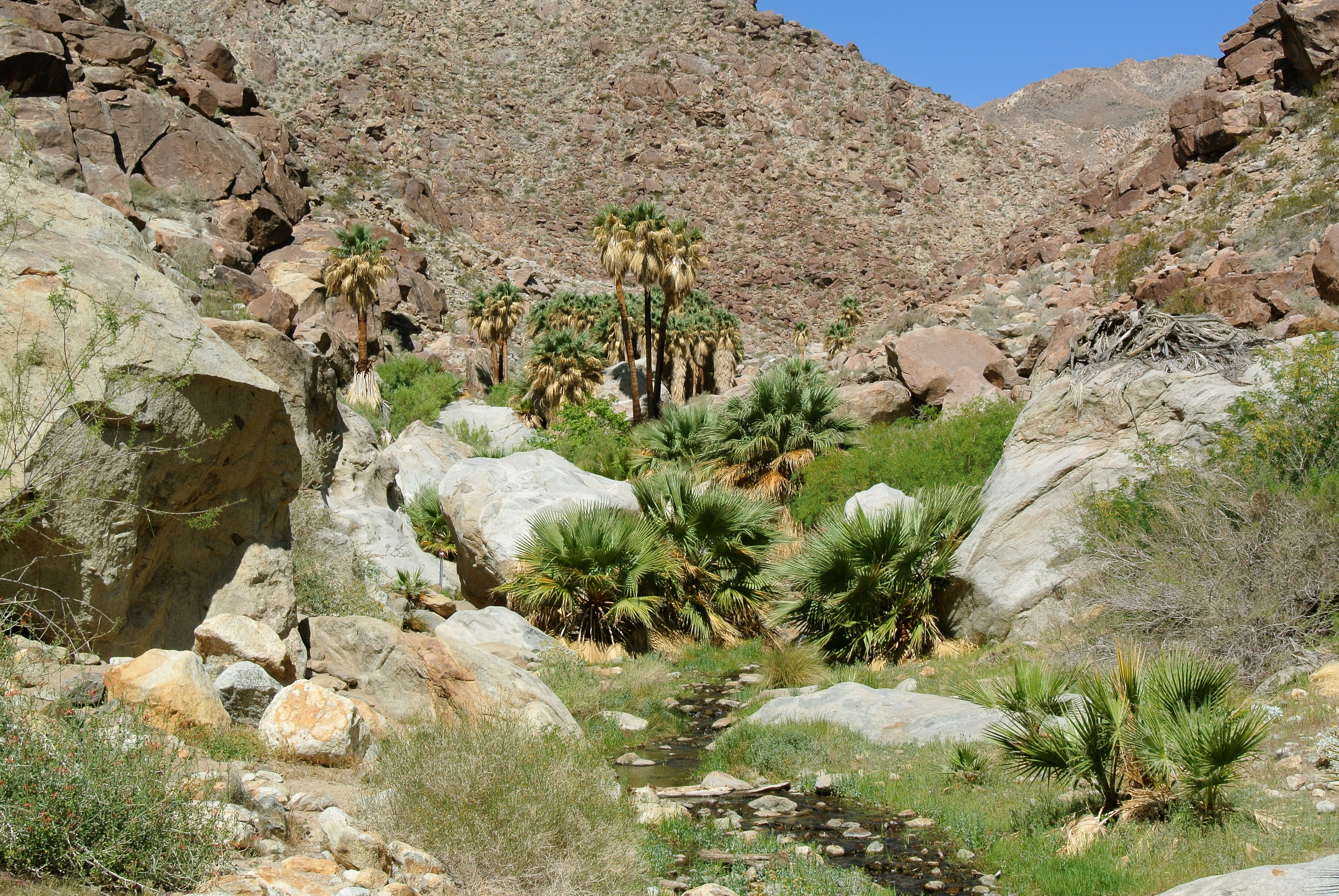
W. filifera trees and fronds in Anza-Borrego Desert State Park

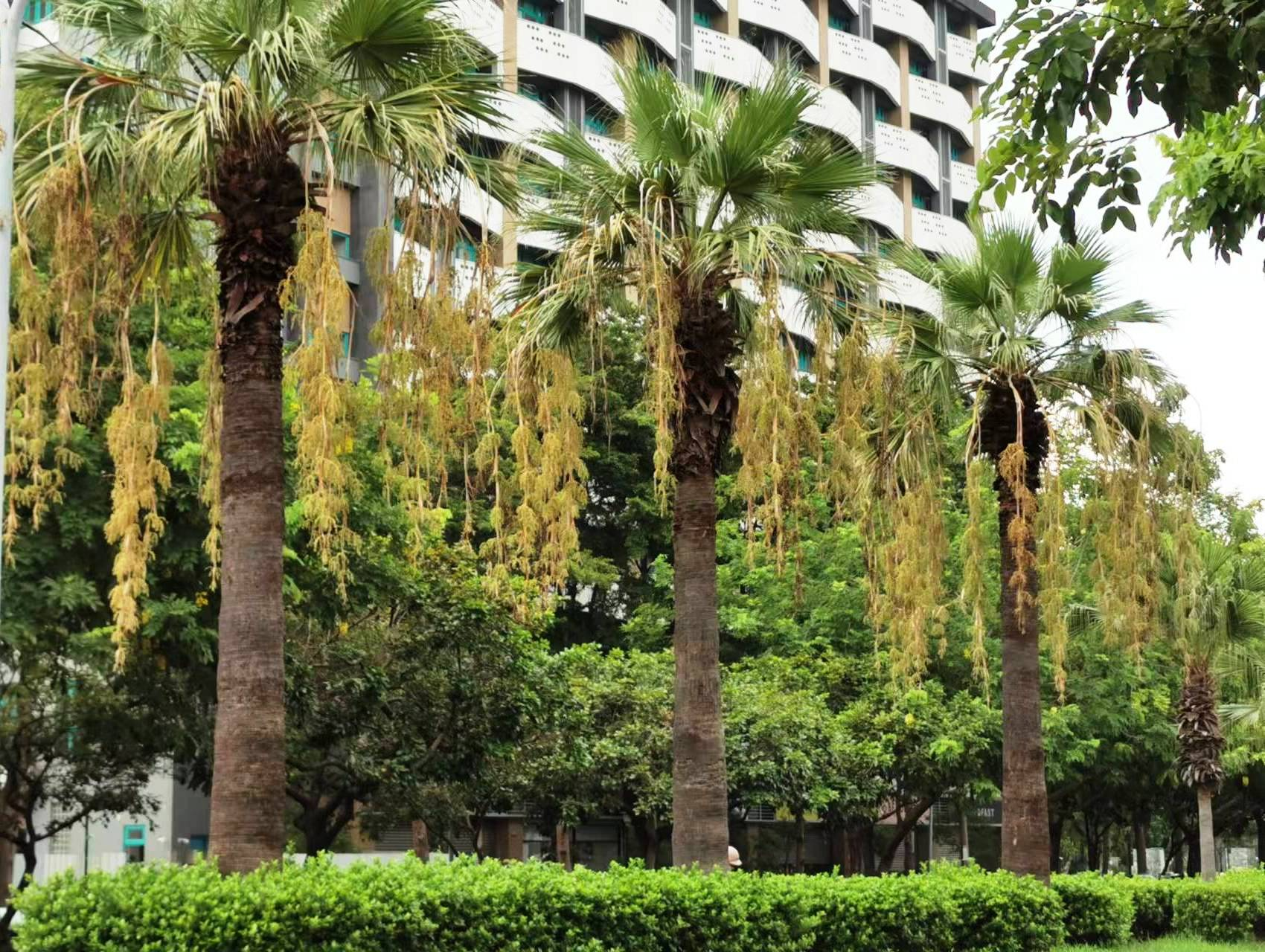
W. filifera, inflorescence and the fruiting season

== See also ==
- Washingtonia filifera var. robusta Mexican fan palm
- Washingtonia × filibusta hybrid
