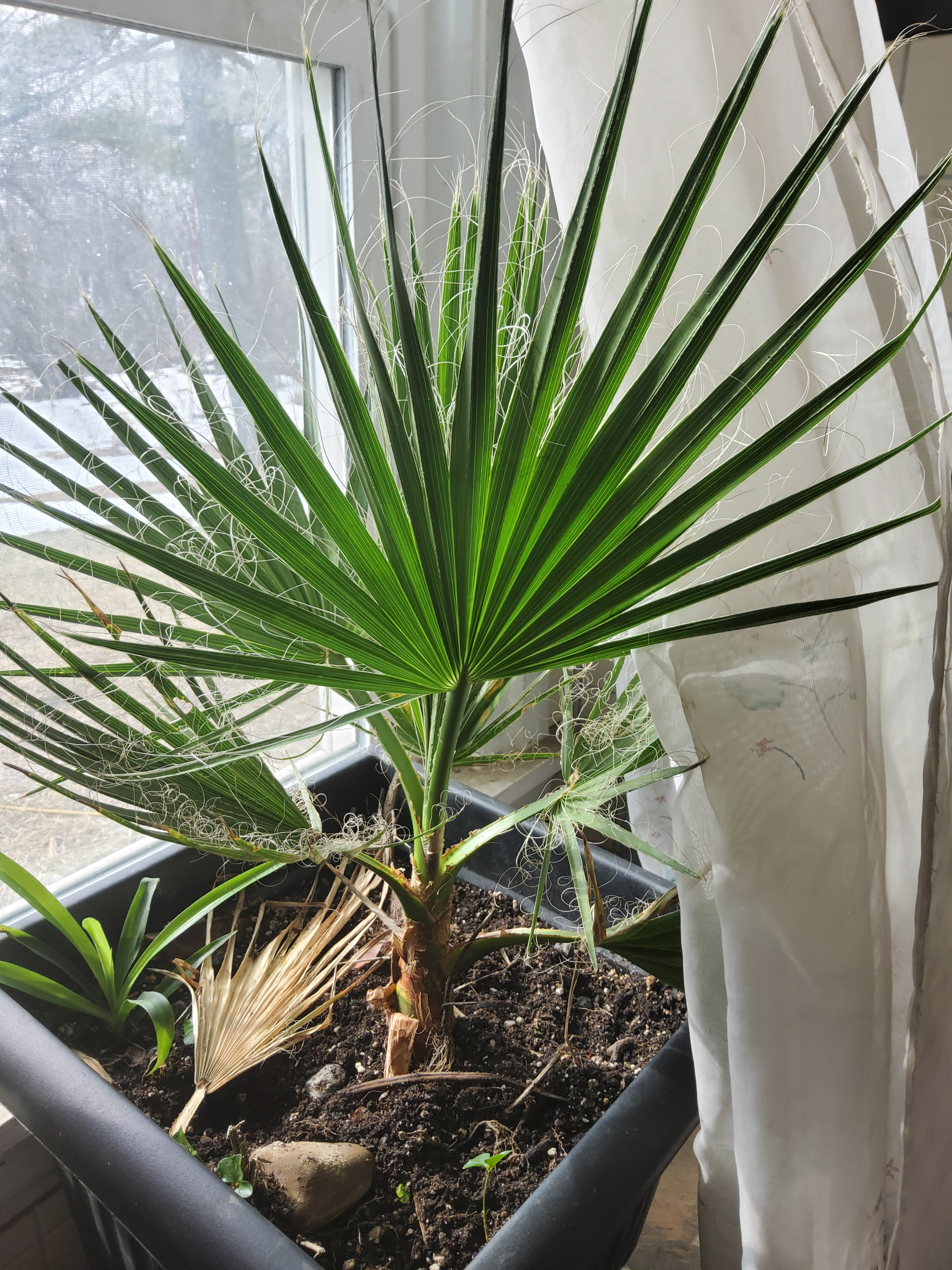

Scientific classification
- Kingdom: Plantae
- Clade: Tracheophytes
- Clade: Angiosperms
- Clade: Monocots
- Clade: Commelinids
- Order: Arecales
- Family: Arecaceae
- Tribe: Trachycarpeae
- Genus: Washingtonia
- Species: W. × filibusta

Binomial name
- Washingtonia × filibusta hort. ex Hodel

= Washingtonia × filibusta =

Species of palm

Washingtonia × filibusta is a hybrid of the species Washingtonia filifera and Washingtonia robusta. Stores do not sell purebreds, they sell the hybrid only. The hybrid does not look too different from the purebred, but is more hardy to cold than W. robusta, especially wet cold.

This palm has been planted in select microclimates in the Seattle, Washington, and Portland, Oregon, area with promising results.
