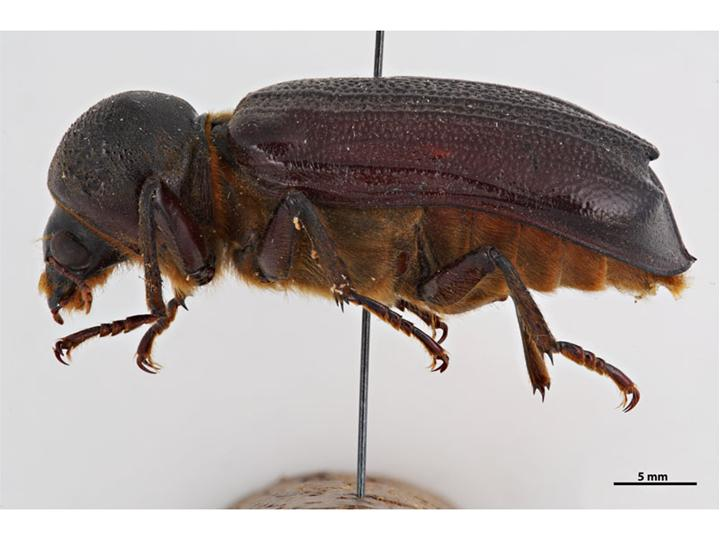
- Dinapate wrightii

Scientific classification
- Kingdom: Animalia
- Phylum: Arthropoda
- Class: Insecta
- Order: Coleoptera
- Suborder: Polyphaga
- Family: Bostrichidae
- Subfamily: Bostrichinae
- Tribe: Apatini
- Genus: Dinapate; Horn, 1886

Selected species
- Dinapate hughleechi; Dinapate wrightii

= Dinapate =

Genus of beetles

Dinapate is a genus of beetles native to North America.
