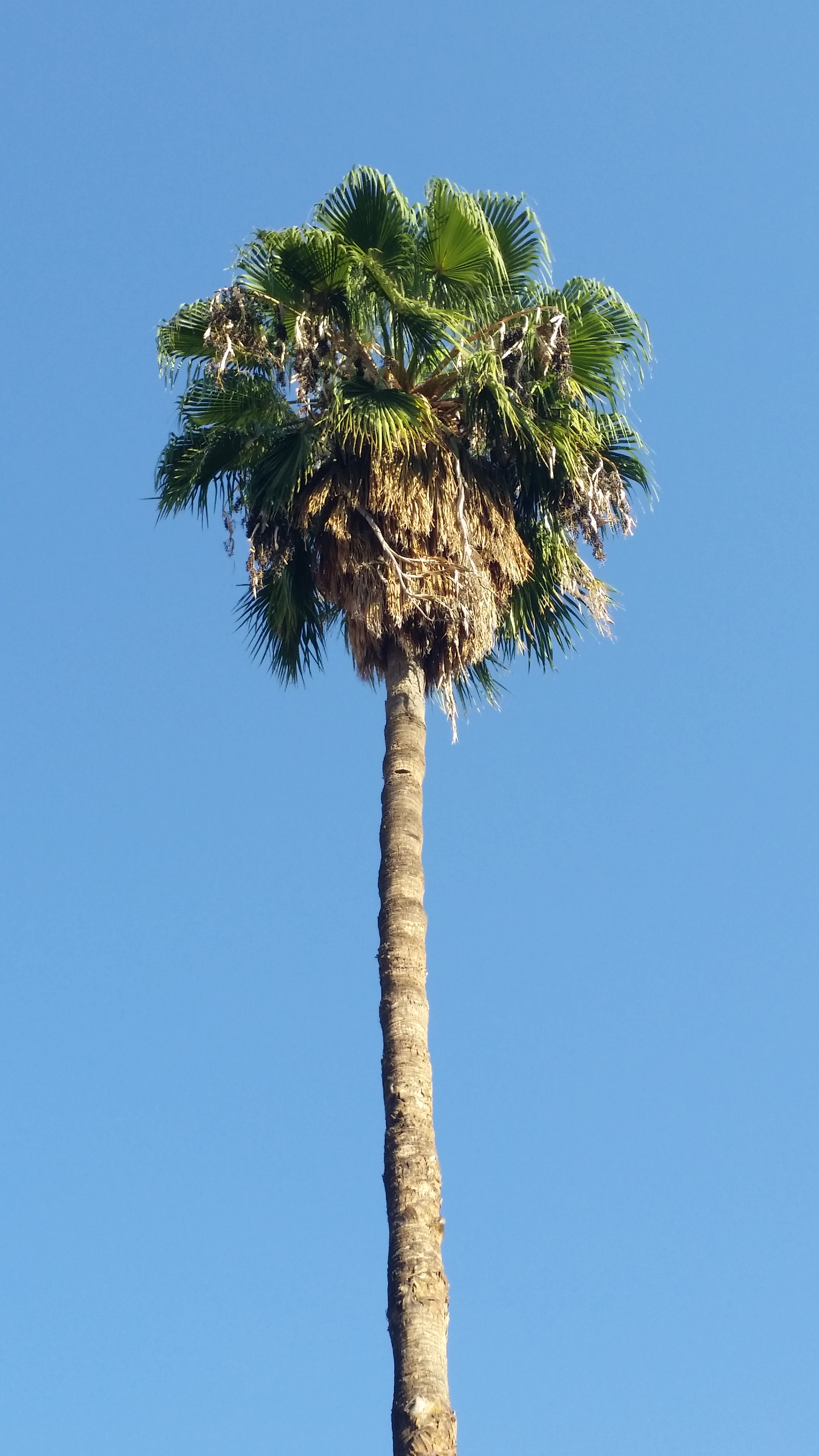
- Washingtonia filifera var. robusta in Majorelle Garden, Marrakesh, Morocco.

Scientific classification
- Kingdom: Plantae
- Clade: Tracheophytes
- Clade: Angiosperms
- Clade: Monocots
- Clade: Commelinids
- Order: Arecales
- Family: Arecaceae
- Genus: Washingtonia
- Species: W. filifera
- Variety: W. f. var. robusta

Trinomial name
- Washingtonia filifera var. robusta (H.Wendl.) Parish

Synonyms
- Brahea robusta Voss; Neowashingtonia robusta (H.Wendl.) A.Heller; Pritchardia robusta (H.Wendl.) Nabonnand; Washingtonia filifera var. gracilis (Parish) L.D.Benson; Washingtonia gracilis Parish; Washingtonia robusta H.Wendl.; Washingtonia robusta var. gracilis (Parish) Parish ex Becc.

= Washingtonia filifera var. robusta =

Species of palm

Washingtonia filifera var. robusta, commonly known as the Mexican fan palm, Mexican washingtonia, or skyduster, is a flowering plant in the family Arecaceae native to the Sonoran desert along the Baja California peninsula. Despite its limited native distribution, W. filifera var. robusta is one of the most widely cultivated subtropical palms in the world. It is naturalized across the southern United States, Mediterranean, and Middle East.

== Description ==
Washingtonia filifera var. robusta grows to 25 m (82 ft) tall, rarely up to 30 m (98 ft). The leaves have a petiole up to 1 m (3 ft 3 in) long, and a palmate fan of leaflets up to 1 m (3 ft 3 in) long. The petioles are armed with sharp thorns. The inflorescence is up to 3 m (10 ft) long, with numerous small, pale orange-pink flowers. The fruit is a spherical, blue-black drupe, 6–8 mm (1/4–5/16 in) diameter; it is edible, though thin-fleshed.

Washingtonia filifera var. filifera—which occupies a more northerly distribution in the states of Arizona, Baja California, and California—is often confused with W. f. var. robusta for their overall similar appearance.

== Taxonomy ==
The Plants of the World Online (POWO), curated by the Royal Botanic Gardens, Kew, currently recognizes the Mexican fan palm as a variety of Washingtonia filifera, along with two other infraspecifics. Under this classification, the Mexican fan palm corresponds specifically to Washingtonia filifera var. robusta.

- Washingtonia filifera var. filifera
- Washingtonia filifera var. robusta (H.Wendl.) Parish
- Washingtonia filifera var. sonorae (S.Watson) M. E. Jones

This classification has been adopted by major global taxonomic databases such as Plants of the World Online and World Flora Online, though some horticultural and regional authorities continue to recognize the palm as the distinct species, Washingtonia robusta.

=== Vernacular names ===
- English: Mexican fan palm, Mexican washingtonia, skyduster
- Spanish: abanico, palma colorado, palma real, palma blanca, palma negra
- Seri: Zamij ctam

== Distribution ==
This palm is native to the Baja California peninsula and Sonora. On the peninsula, it occurs from the Sierra de La Asamblea and the Baja California desert south into the Vizcaino region and the Sierra de La Giganta, and into the southern cape. In Sonora, it occurs in canyons in the western half of the state, particularly in the palm oases of the Sierra El Aguaje north of Guaymas. It is relatively restricted, and is suspected to be a relict population in Sonora. It has the fewest plants in the palm oases that are shared with two other more numerous species, Brahea brandegeei and Sabal uresana.

== Cultivation ==
Like the closely related Washingtonia filifera var. filifera (California fan palm), it is grown as an ornamental tree. Although very similar, the Mexican washingtonia has a narrower trunk (which is typically somewhat wider at the base), and grows slightly faster and taller; it is also somewhat less cold hardy than the California fan palm, hardy to about −8 °C (18 °F).

Field research conducted on W. filifera var. robusta in its native habitat on the Baja California peninsula concluded that its potential longevity may exceed 500 years. Supporting research by Barry Tomlinson and Brett Huggett states that there is "evidence for extreme longevity of metabolically functioning cells of considerable diversity in palm stems." Many of the iconic "sky dusters" of Los Angeles that have survived the chainsaws of progress are documented in photography from the 19th century.

The Mexican fan palm is normally grown in the desert Southwestern United States, in areas such as California, Arizona, southern Nevada, extreme southwestern Utah and Texas. It also cultivated in the coastal areas of South Atlantic states and the Gulf Coast, including southern North Carolina, coastal South Carolina, southern Georgia, and Florida. Along the Gulf Coast, Mexican fan palms can be found growing along the Florida west coast westward to South Texas.

Washingtonia × filibusta is a hybrid of W. filifera var. robusta and W. filifera var. filifera, and has intermediate characteristics of the two parents, especially greater tolerance of wet cold.

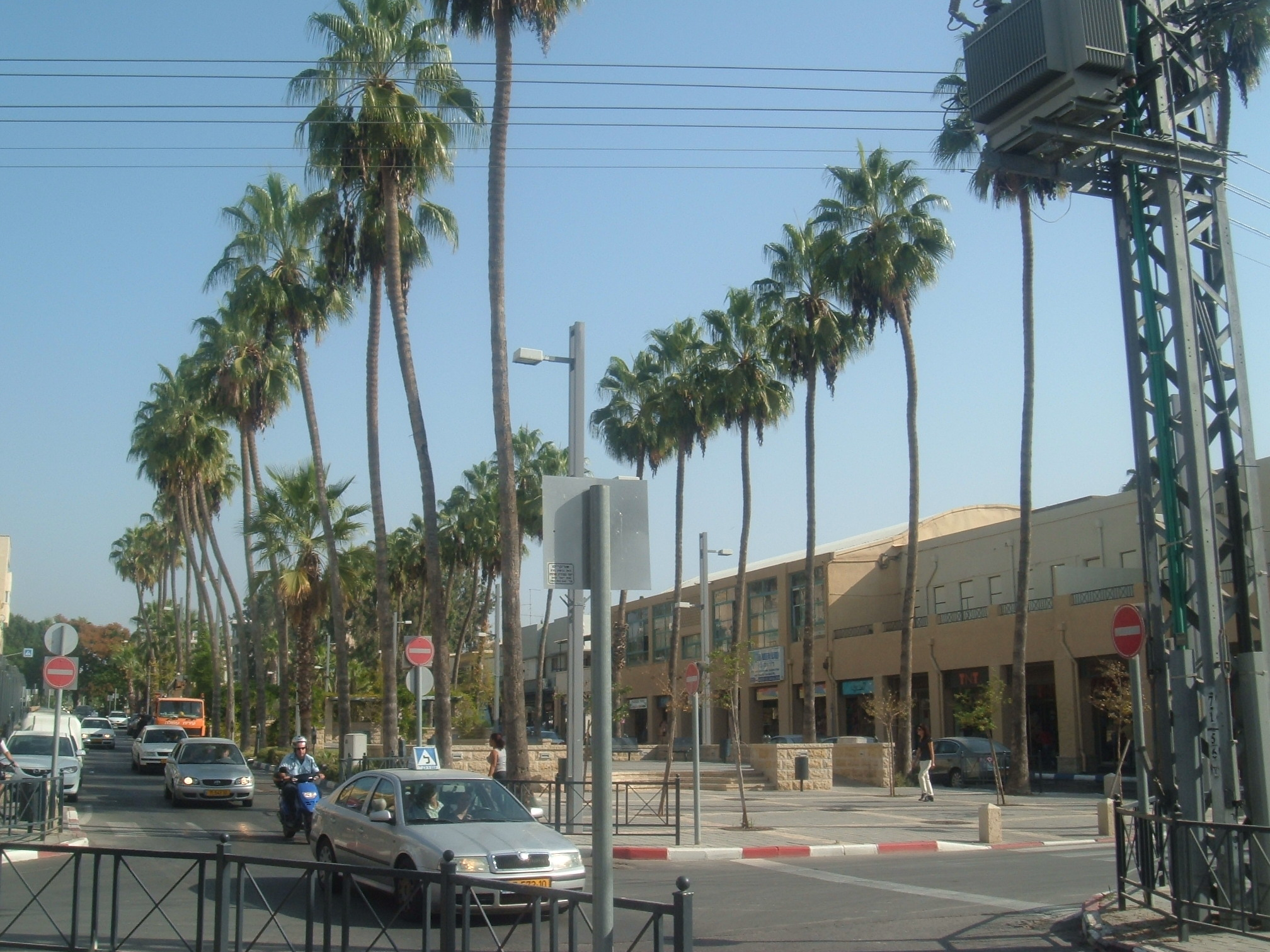
Arlozorov avenue, Afula, Israel

== Maintenance ==
Washingtonia filifera var. robusta does not drop its older leaves but retains them firmly attached to the trunk as it grows. This is referred to as the beard or skirt of the tree. When growing in the wild, the tree's large, heavy skirt is a great asset for wasps, rats, mice, scorpions, birds, spiders, and other small animals, who can use the complex environment as a nest and habitat similar to the way small fish and invertebrates nest in a coral reef. However, in the context of a hotel, golf course or home, the proliferation of small animals can become a nuisance to human property owners. For this reason, when W. filifera var. robusta is cultivated, its skirt of heavy, dry, dead leaves is typically cut ("trimming"), and then the leaf bases are removed to give the trunk a relatively smooth, uniform appearance ("skinning") by arborists. Due to the tree's great height, and the extreme weight of the skirt, this process has been extremely dangerous and potentially lethal to arborists. As a result, the California Department of Public Health developed a series of reports and training materials to prevent accidents while trimming tall skirt-bearing palms such as W. filifera var. robusta.

== Gallery ==
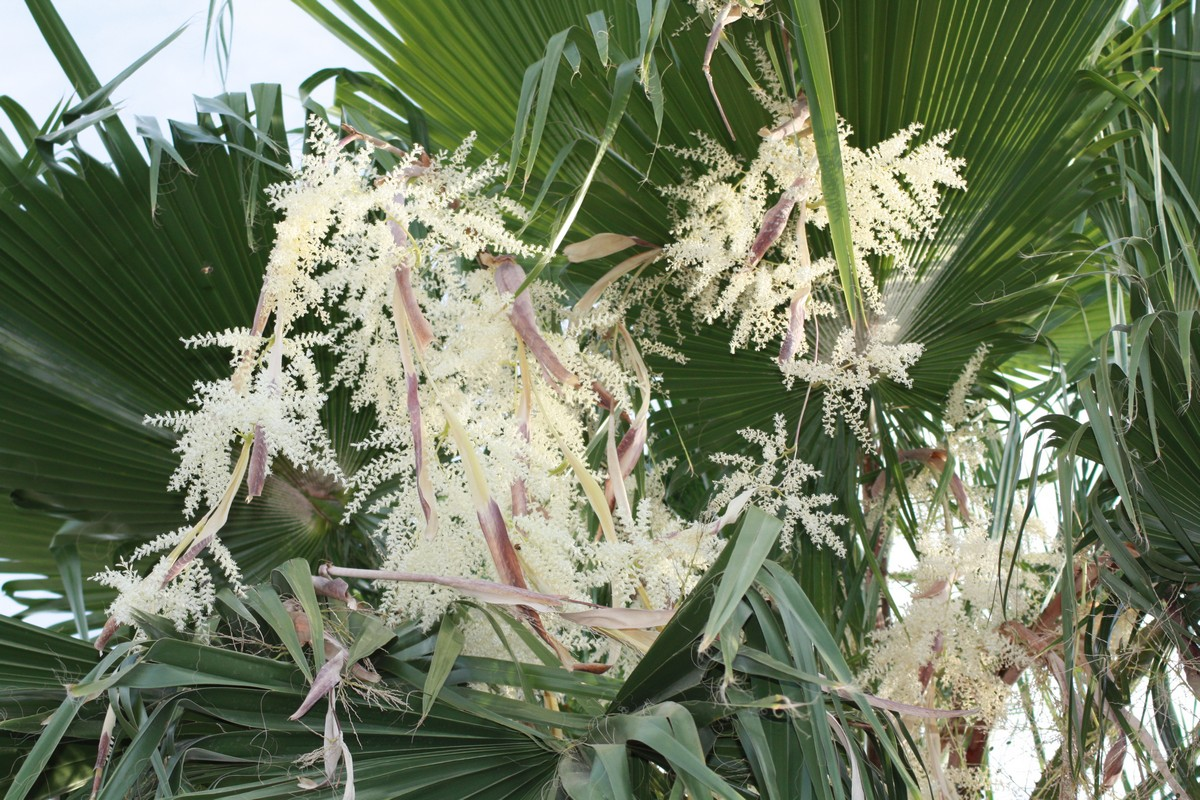
Flowering palm in Chandler, Arizona

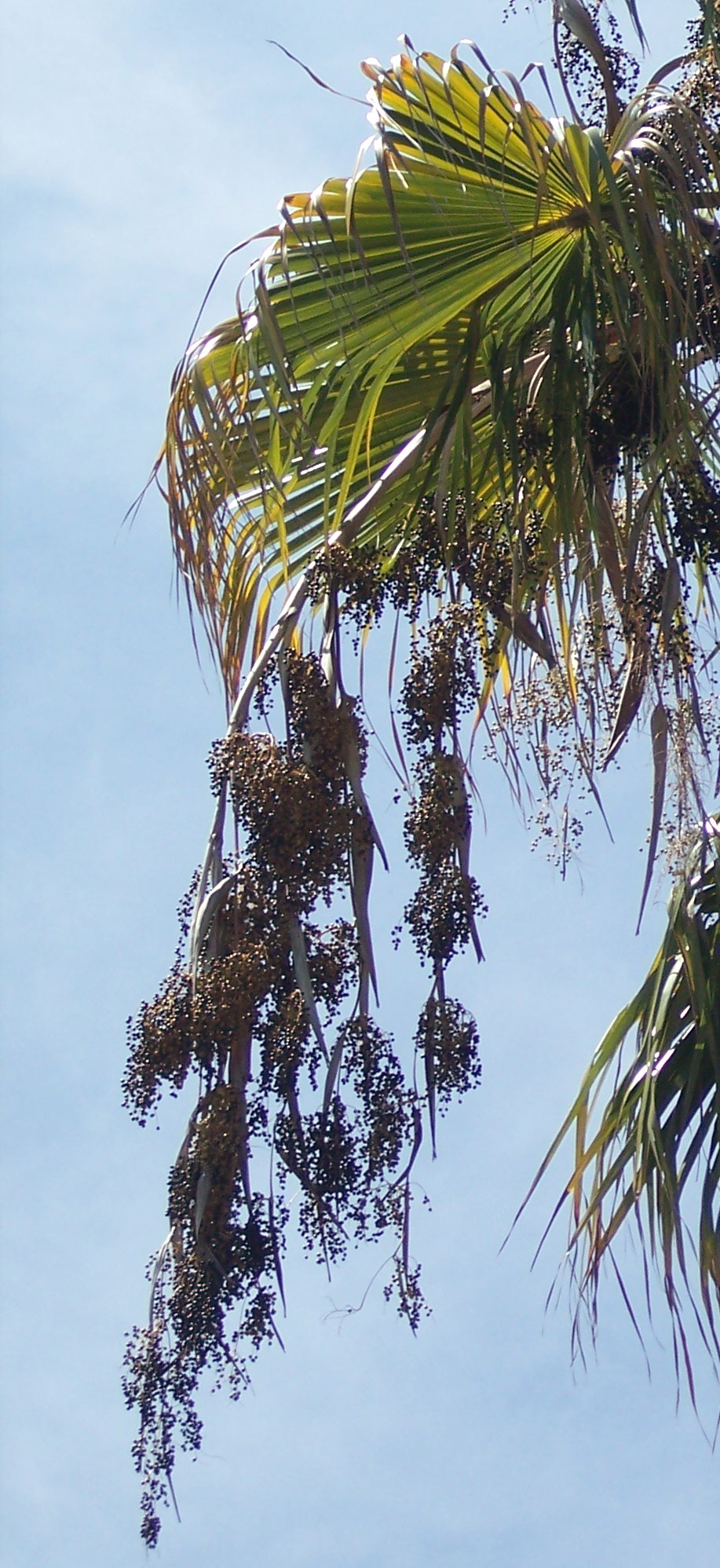
Infructescence

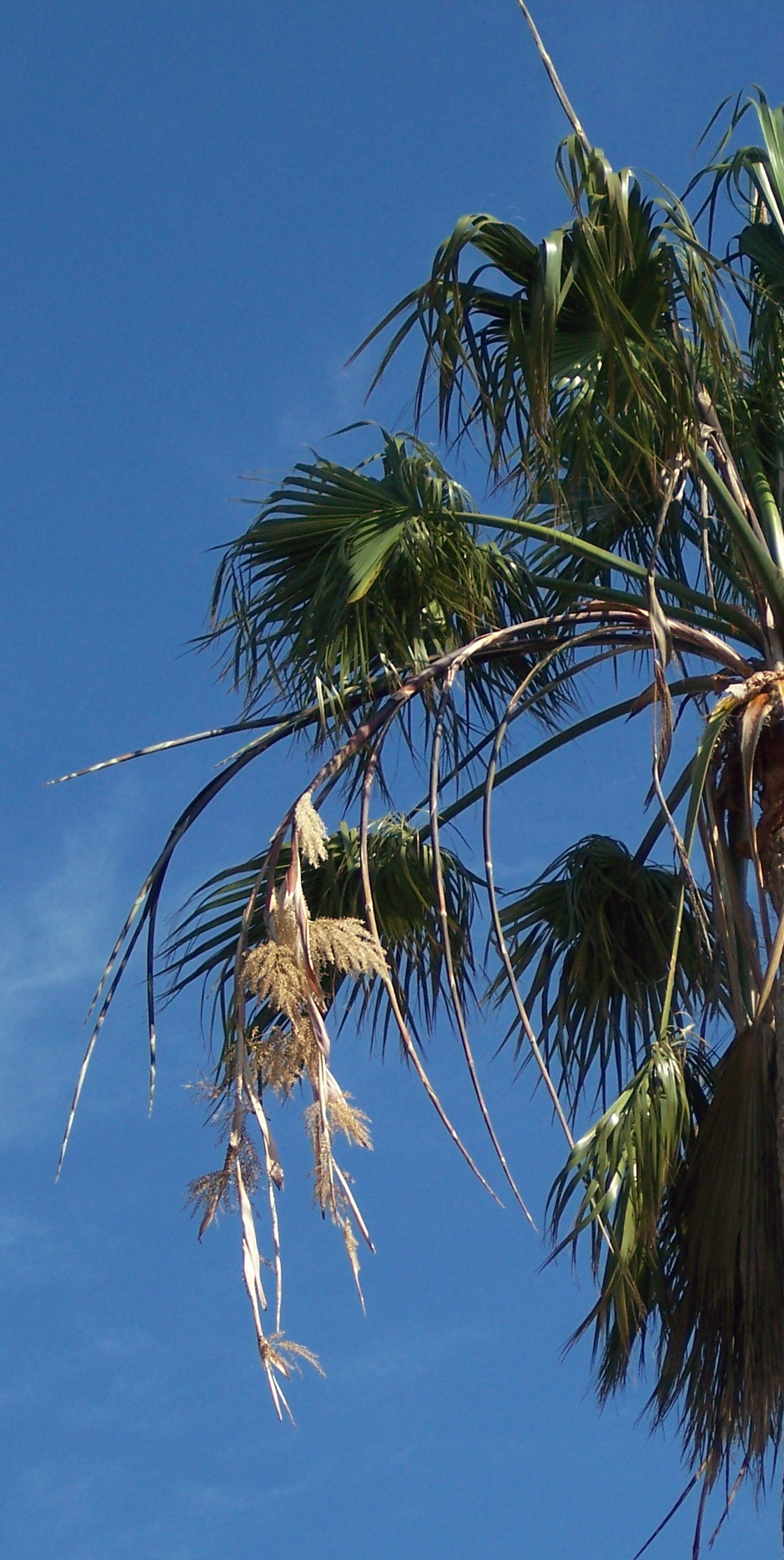
Inflorescence

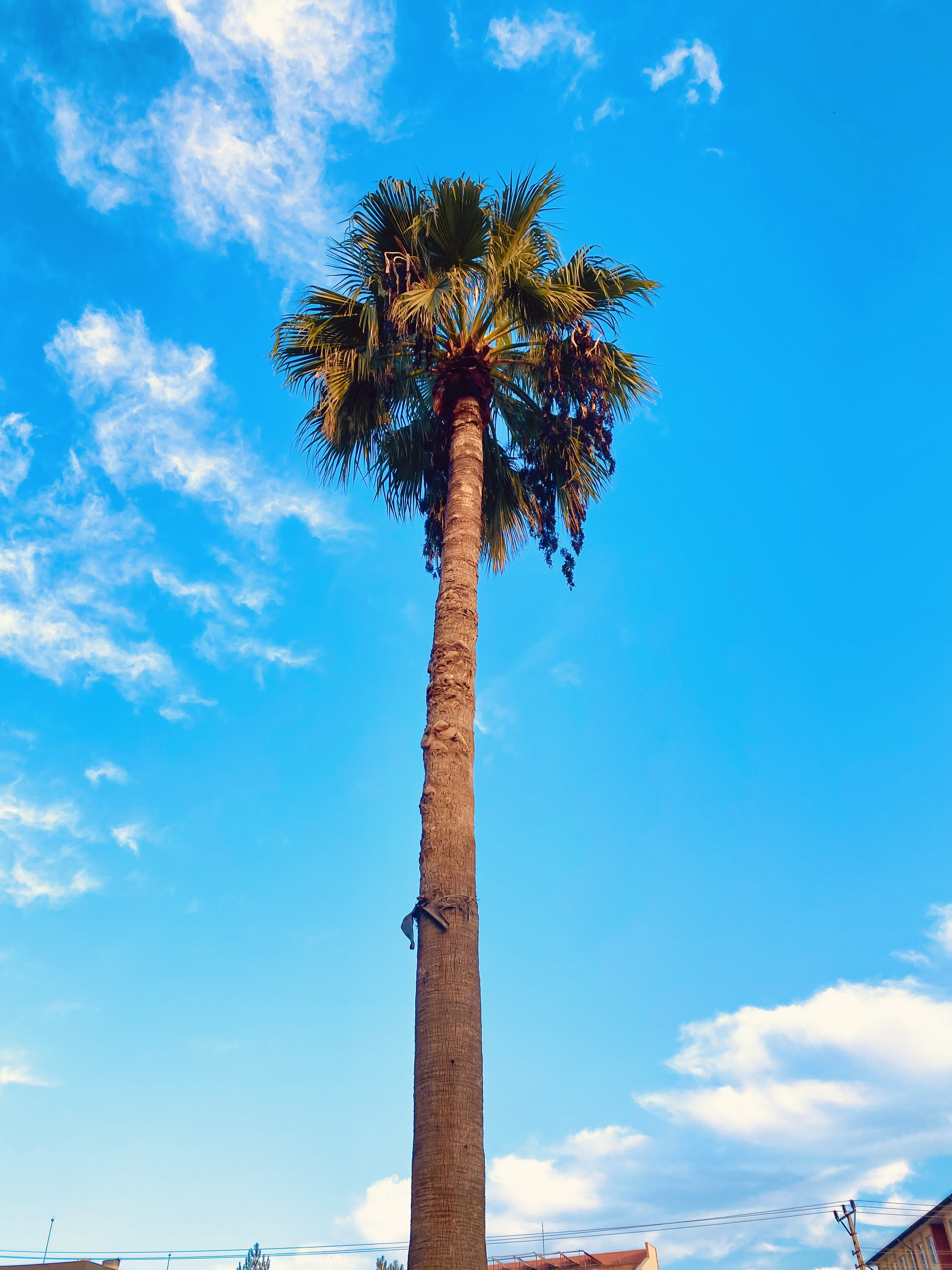
Washingtonia filifera var. robusta with an average height of 59 feet, Gaziantep, Turkey

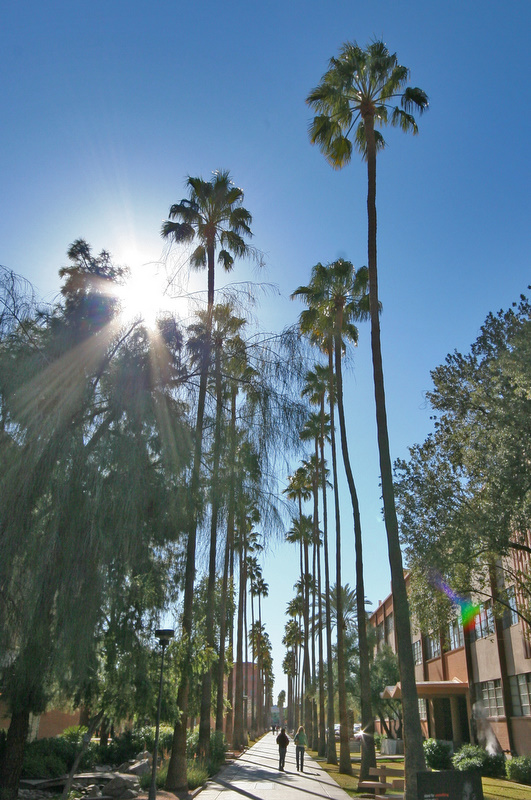
Arizona State University's Palm Walk

Species in Venice Beach, California

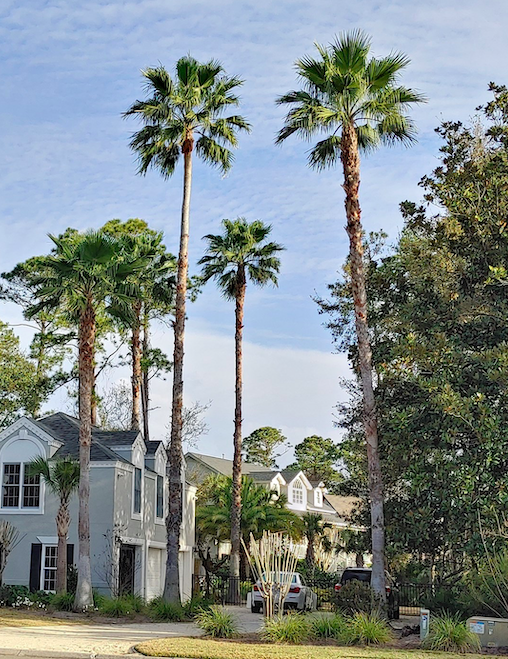
W. filifera var. robusta growing in Saint Simons Island, Georgia

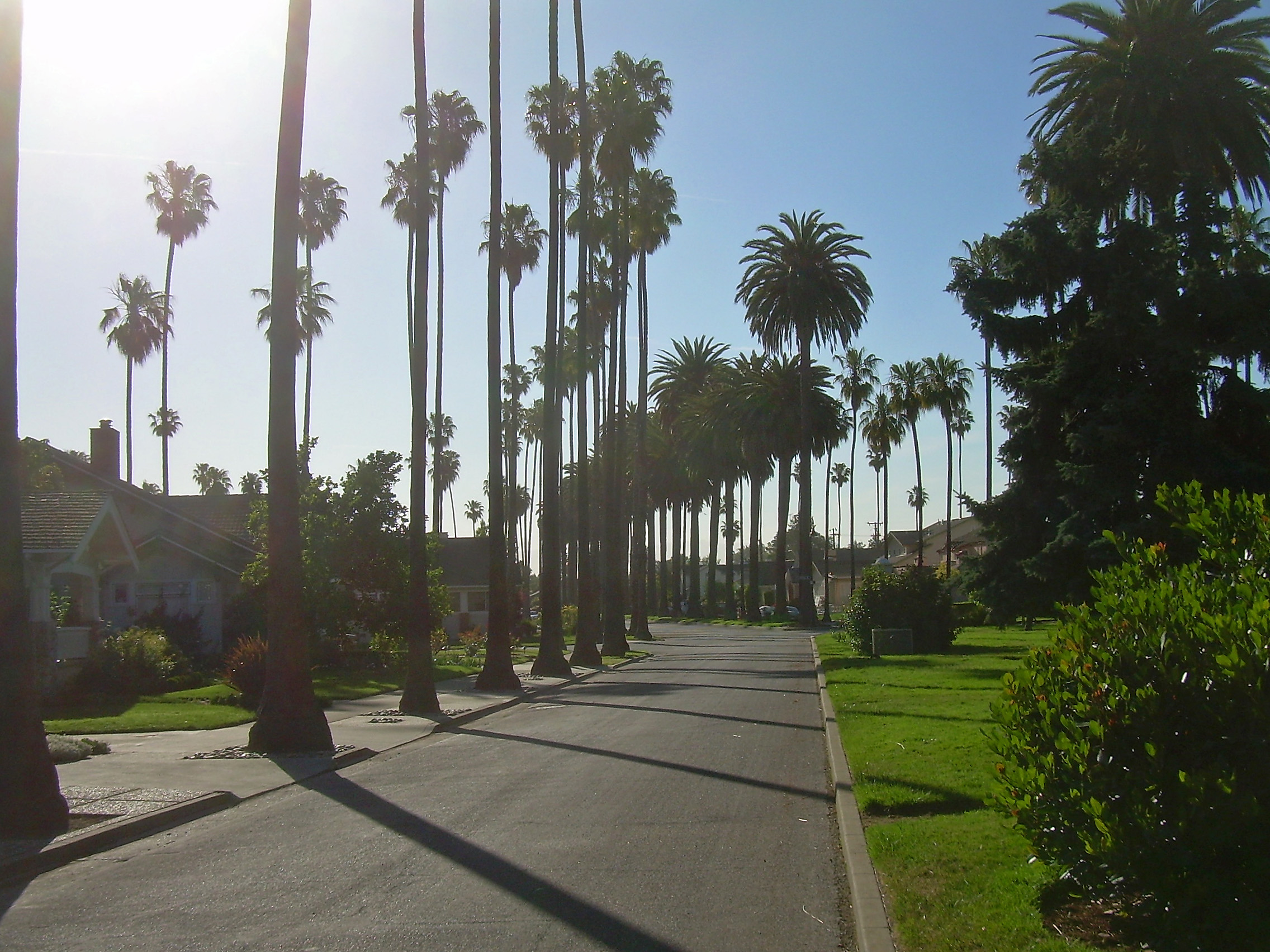
W. filifera var. robusta and Canary Island date palms are commonly seen lining many streets throughout San Jose, California.

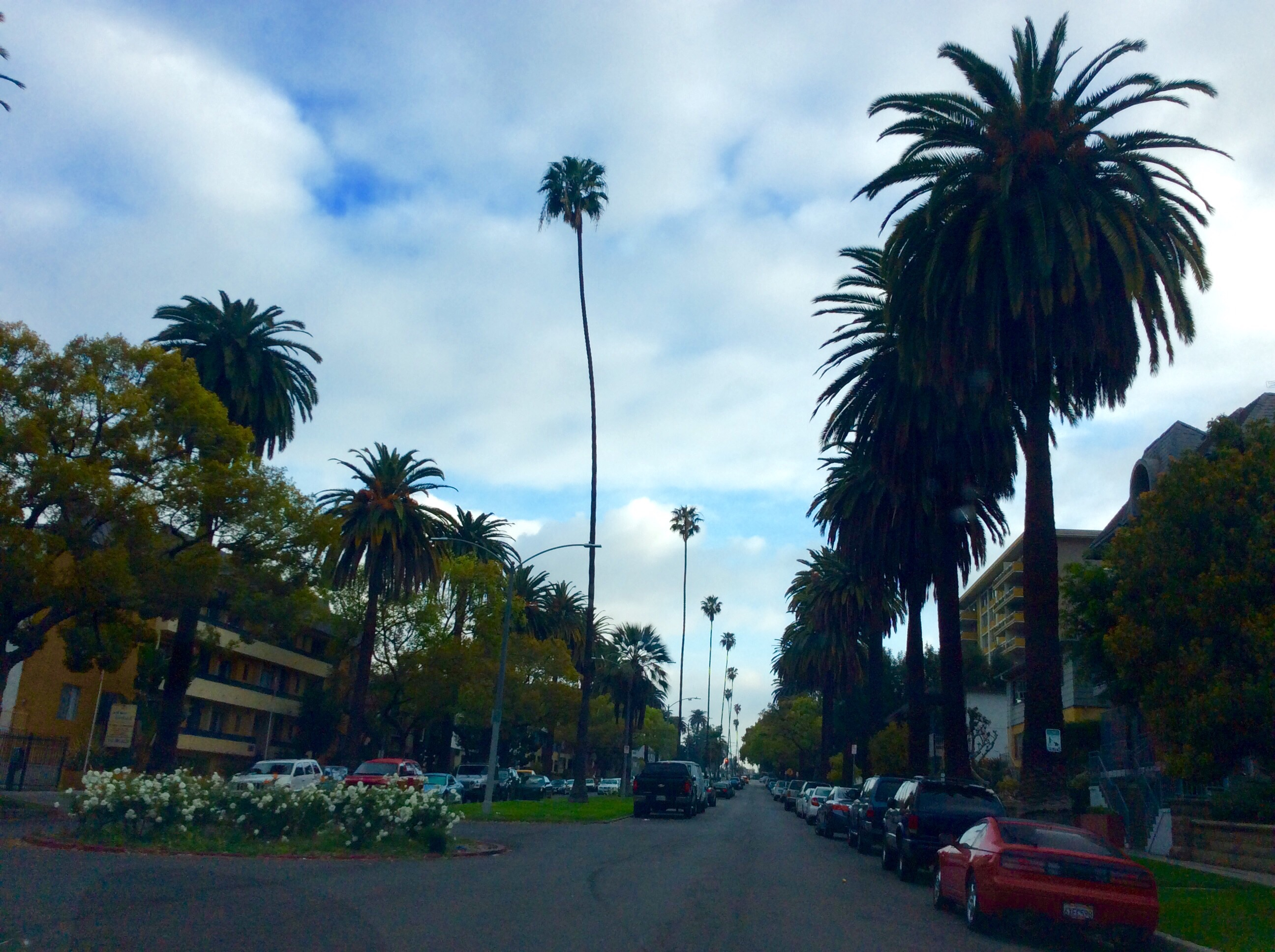
Palm trees lined up at S. Occidental Blvd between Koreatown and Westlake of Los Angeles, California

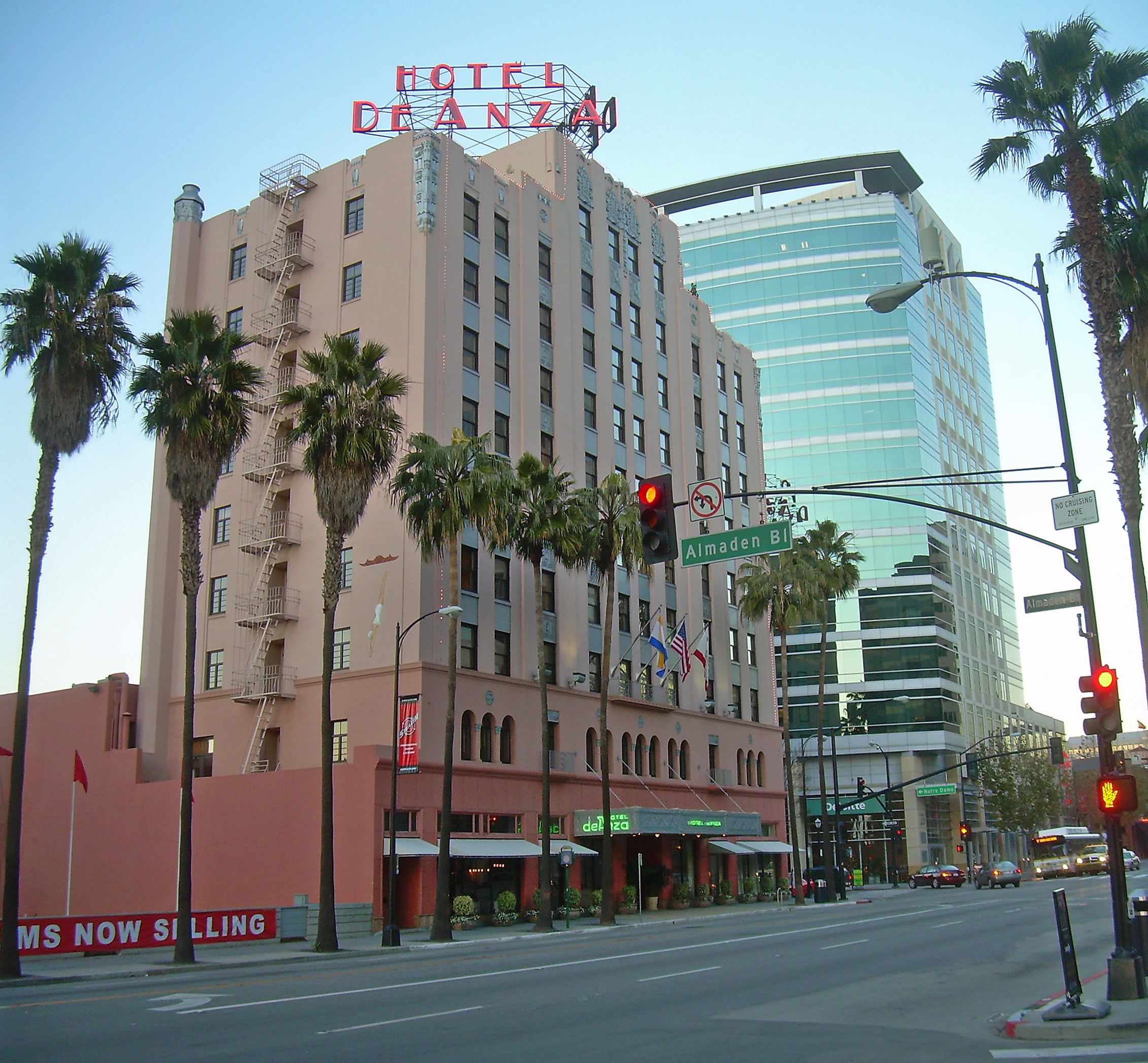
Species line Santa Clara Street in San Jose, California

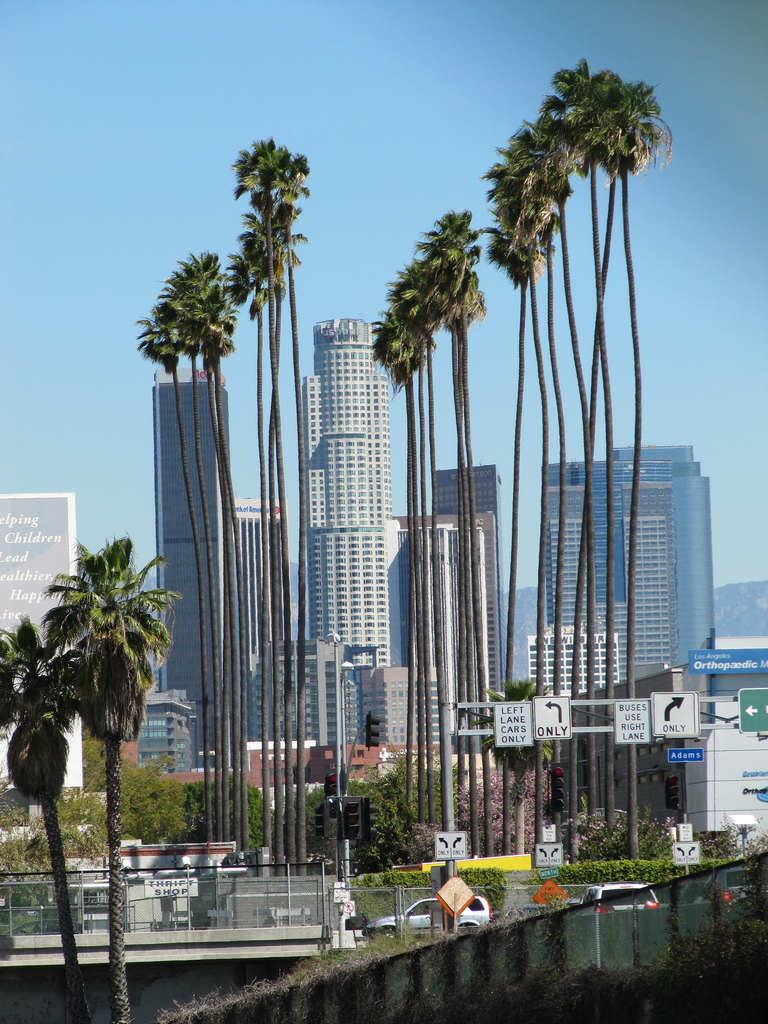
Oldest palms in Los Angeles, planted circa 1875

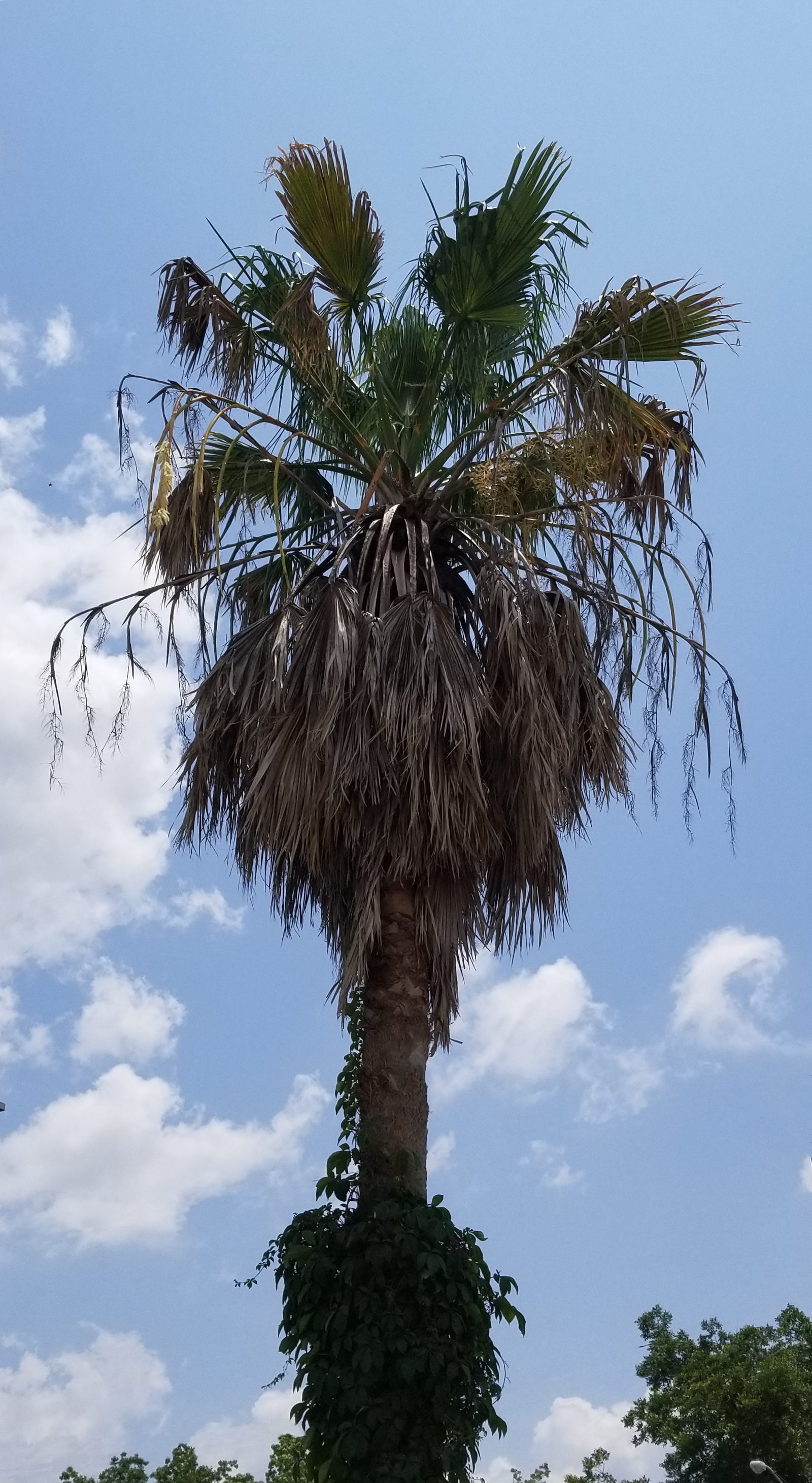
A Mexican fan palm tree in Enterprise, Alabama

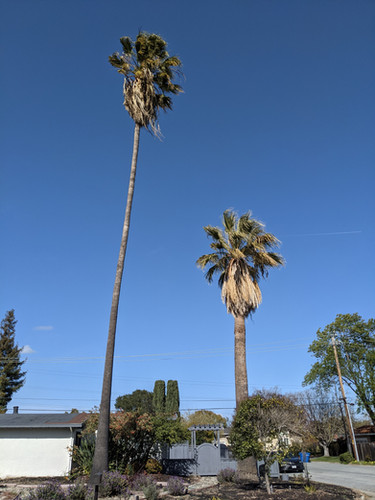
Mexican Fan Palm From Sacramento, California
