= Seki =

Seki may refer to:

== Places ==
- Seki, Gifu, a city in Japan
- Seki River, a river in Japan
- Şəki, a city and provincial capital in Azerbaijan
- Şəki (village), a village and municipality in Azerbaijan
- Šeki, a small town in Slovenia
- Seki, Bismil
- Seki, Ilgaz, a village in Turkey
- Seki, İskilip
- Seki, Osmancık
- Seki, Tavas

== Other uses ==
- Seki, a term in the game of Go
- SEKI, an acronym for Sequoia and Kings Canyon National Parks in California
- Seki language, a Bantu language of Equatorial Guinea and Gabon
- Sushi Seki, a Japanese sushi restaurant in New York City

== People with the surname ==
- Akiko Seki (関 鑑子; 1899–1973), Japanese soprano
- Atsuko Seki (born 1964), Japanese pianist
- Deniz Seki (born 1970), Turkish female pop singer
- Hajime Seki (關 一; 1873–1935), Japanese politician
- Jun Seki (関 潤; born 1961), Japanese businessman
- Junichi Seki (關 淳一; 1935–2024), Japanese politician
- Kaiya Seki (関 海哉; born 1999), Japanese swimmer
- Kanami Seki (関 夏菜美; born 2000), Japanese ice hockey player
- Seki Kazumasa (関 一政; 1564–1625), Japanese daimyō
- Kazuto Seki (関 一人; born 1975), Japanese sailing competitor
- Keigo Seki ((関 敬吾; 1899–1990), Japanese folklorist
- Kentaro Seki ((関 憲太郎; born 1986), Japanese football player
- Kenzo Seki (関 健三; born 1955), Japanese handball player
- Kiyohide Seki (関 清英; 1851–1927), Japanese politician
- Koji Seki (disambiguation), multiple people
- Mamoru Seki (関 衛; 1909–1942), Imperial Japanese Navy officer
- Masako Seki (関 正子; died 2019), Japanese table tennis player
- Megumi Seki (関 めぐみ; born 1985), Japanese actress
- Misao Seki (関 操; 1884-????), Japanese film actor and comedian
- Mitsuhiro Seki (関 光博; born 1982), Japanese footballer
- Nanami Seki (関 菜々巳; born 1999), Japanese volleyball player
- Natsue Seki (関 ナツエ; born 1966), Japanese cyclist
- Nobuhiro Seki Japanese businessman and entrepreneur
- Shina Seki Japanese supercentenarian
- Sunny Seki (born 1947) Japanese–born American writer, illustrator, and photographer
- Suzuko Seki (関 鈴子; born 1936), Japanese gymnast
- Seki Takakazu (関 孝和; 1642–1708), also known as Seki Kōwa (関 孝和), Japanese mathematician
- Takamichi Seki (関 隆倫; born 1981), Japanese football player
- Tei Seki (関 禎), Japanese rear admiral in the Imperial Japanese Navy
- Tokio Seki (関 時男; born 1944), Japanese actor and voice actor
- Tomokazu Seki (関 智一; born 1972), Japanese actor, voice actor, and singer
- Toshihiko Seki (関 俊彦; born 1962), Japanese actor, voice actor, singer and narrator
- Tsutomu Seki (関 勉; born 1930), Japanese astronomer
- Yoshifumi Seki (関 義文; born 1953), Japanese boxer
- Yoshihiro Seki (関 芳弘; born 1965), Japanese politician
- Yoshimi Seki (関よしみ; born 1957), Japanese manga artist
- Lieutenant Yukio Seki (関 行男; 1921–1944), the pilot who led the first attack of a Kamikaze unit
- Yumiko Seki (関 有美子; born 1998), Japanese former member of idol group Sakurazaka46

== People with the given name ==
- Seki Sano (佐野 碩; 1905-1966), Japanese actor, stage director, and choreographer
- Seki Matsunaga (松永 碩; 1928–2013), Japanese football player
- Seki Yoshida Japanese supercentenarian

== See also ==
- Sheki (disambiguation)
- Şəkili (disambiguation)
- Guān (surname), written 関 (Chinese: 关t=關)
