= Politics of Osaka City =

Politics of Osaka City, as in all municipalities of Japan, takes place in the framework of local autonomy that is guaranteed by chapter 8 of the Constitution and laid out in the Local Autonomy Law. As one of Japan's 20 major cities designated by government ordinance (seirei shitei toshi), Osaka City has some administrative responsibilities that are handled by the prefectures in ordinary municipalities and is subdivided into wards.

The administration is headed by a mayor directly elected by the people every four years in first-past-the-post elections. Enacting and amending city ordinances, passing the budget and approving important administrative appointments, including the vice-mayors and the treasurer, are handled by the city assembly that is directly elected by the people every four years by single-non transferable vote. As in all prefectures and municipalities, citizens may initiate chokusetsu seikyū ("direct demands"), i.e. mayor and assembly are subject to recall referendums, and the people can influence policies directly via petitions and plebiscites.

Osaka City is the prefectural capital of Osaka and Japan's second largest incorporated city after Yokohama, Kanagawa. Political debate in Osaka City has in recent years been dominated by the Osaka Metropolis plan of former Osaka governor and current Osaka City mayor Tōru Hashimoto and his Osaka Restoration Association. Under the plan, Osaka City and Osaka's other designated city, Sakai City, would be abolished, subdivided into special wards that have a status as municipalities but leave some municipal tasks and revenues to the prefectural administration. As mayor, Hashimoto has set up an office to prepare for the unification of city and prefectural administration.

== Historical background ==
As one of Japan's three most important cities (the "three capitals", santo: Tokyo City, Osaka City and Kyoto City), wards (ku) as subdivisions of the city were set up in 1878 and are thereby older than the city as a modern administrative unit itself, and when (albeit limited) local autonomy was introduced for other municipalities in the 1880s, autonomy rights in Tokyo City, Osaka City and Kyoto City were limited by a special imperial decree: The governor of Osaka also took the role of mayor of Osaka City and there was no independent city executive. After the decree had been lifted in 1898, the administration evolved as in other major cities of Japan. Unlike Tokyo City, Osaka City was not dissolved by the central government in World War II. In 1947, the U.S. drafted constitution and the Local Autonomy Law created the current legal framework of local autonomy for the city. In 1956, it became one of the first five "designated major cities".

== National representation ==
Osaka City is covered by six of Osaka's 19 electoral districts for the House of Representatives. Osaka's 1st through 5th districts only consist of wards of Osaka city, the 6th districts covers the Asahi and Tsurumi wards but also extends into other areas of Osaka, namely Moriguchi City and Kadoma City.

== Prefectural representation ==
As in all designated cities, Osaka City's wards serve as electoral districts for the Osaka Prefectural Assembly. Most are single- or two-member districts. Together they elect 33 of the 109 members of the assembly.

== Mayor ==
Osaka City's current mayor is Tōru Hashimoto who had resigned as Osaka governor in 2011 to run in the mayoral election against incumbent Kunio Hiramatsu. Hashimoto won a clear victory even though Hiramatsu was supported by the established parties including the Japanese Communist Party who had for the first time since 1963 not nominated their own mayoral candidate to prevent Hashimoto's alleged "fascist, dictatorial" policies. As mayor, Hashimoto supports the implementation of the Osaka Metropolis plan, opposes unions particularly the unions of public sector workers (local public servants union, teachers union, transportation workers union), and has taken an anti-nuclear stance in the energy policy debate after the earthquake in 2011. While Hashimoto's reformism is popular among his supporters not only in the city or the prefecture but nationwide (where he and his party threaten to contest elections if the national Diet obstructs his reforms), opponents see him as a populist and criticize his leadership style as authoritarian, also referred to as "Hashism" (ハシズム).

Mayoral elections had been held as part of unified regional elections since 1947 until 1971 when Kaoru Chūma's death caused an early election.

Previous independent mayors of Osaka City (for the governors of the prefecture who also had served as mayors of the prefectural capital before 1898, see the List of governors of Osaka Prefecture):

1. Tahee Tamura, 1898–1901,
2. Sadakichi Tsuruhara, 1901–1905,
3. Shigetake Yamashita, 1905–1909,
4. Shunpei Uemura, 1910–1912,
5. Kaneyuki Kimotsuke, 1913,
6. Shirō Ikegami, 1913–1923,
7. Hajime Seki, 1923–1935,
8. Takeo Kagami, 1935–1936,
9. Muneji Sakama, 1936–1945,
10. Mitsuji Nakai, 1945–1946,
11. Hiroo Kondō (I–S), 1 term, 1947–1951, the first mayor after the introduction of direct popular election,
12. Mitsuji Nakai (I), 3 terms, 1951–1963
13. Kaoru Chūma (I–S, JCP, DSP), 3 terms, 1963–1971 (died in office),
14. Yasushi Ōshima (I–L, Kōmeitō, DSP, additionally Socialist support in his third and fourth elections), 4 terms, 1971–1987,
15. Masaya Nishio, 2 terms, 1987–1995,
16. Takafumi Isomura (I), 2 terms, 1995–2003,
17. Jun'ichi Seki (I, Liberal Democratic and Kōmeitō support in the 2005 and 2007 elections), 2 terms, 2003–2005 (resigned) and 2005–2007,
18. Kunio Hiramatsu (I–D, PNP, additionally Liberal Democratic, Kōmeitō and JCP support in the 2011 election), 1 term, 2007–2011.

== Council ==
The Osaka City Council (as in some other major cities shikai, not shigikai) has 86 members who are elected by single non-transferable vote every four years in unified regional elections. The wards serve as electoral districts, each elects between two and six council members. In the 2011 elections, Tōru Hashimoto's Osaka Restoration Assembly became strongest party in the council, at the same time also winning a plurality of seats in neighbouring Sakai City and a majority in the Osaka Assembly.

The current composition of the assembly is as follows (as of October 23, 2017):

Composition of the Osaka City Council
Parliamentary group	Seats
Osaka Restoration Association (Ōsaka Ishin no Kai, "Ōsaka renewal assembly")	33
Liberal Democratic Party	20
Kōmeitō ("Justice Party")	19
Japanese Communist Party	9
Go OSAKA	1
Osaka Abe	1
Total	83

The current assembly president is Masahiko Yamashita (Ōsaka Ishin, Yodogawa ward electoral district), the vice president is Naoki Akashi (Kōmeitō, Joto ward).
