= Sekigawa =

Sekigawa (Japanese: 関川 (せきかわ)) is a Japanese surname.

People using this name include:

- "Mr. Sekigawa" (stagename) alternate ringname for professional wrestler Mr. Pogo
- Hideo Sekigawa (1908–1977), Japanese film director
- Ikuma Sekigawa (born 2000; Japanese: 関川 郁万, romanized: Sekigawa Ikuma), Japanese soccer player
- Shusui Sekigawa (born 1913), Japanese rower
- Tetsuo Sekigawa (1951–2017; Japanese: 関川 哲夫, romanized: Sekigawa Tetsuo), Japanese pro-wrestler

== See also ==
- Seki (disambiguation)
- Gawa (disambiguation)
