= Isomura =

Isomura (written: 磯村) is a Japanese surname. Notable people with the surname include:

- Hayato Isomura (磯村 勇斗, born 1992), Japanese actor
- Itsumichi Isomura (磯村 一路, born 1950), Japanese film director
- Ryota Isomura (磯村 亮太, born 1991), Japanese footballer
- Takafumi Isomura (磯村 隆文, 1930–2007), Japanese politician
- Tomomi Isomura (磯村 知美), Japanese voice actress
- Yoshiyuki Isomura (born 1955), Japanese golfer
