= Şəkili =

Şəkili or Shekili may refer to:

- Şəkili, Agdash, Azerbaijan
- Şəkili, Goychay, Azerbaijan
