= Sheki =

Sheki can refer to:

- Shiki District (disambiguation), multiple places
- Sheki, Azerbaijan, a city
- Shaki District or Şeki (Azerbaijani: Şəki rayonu) is a rayon of Azerbaijan whose capital is Sheki.
- Shaki Khanate
- Sheki, Ethiopia, a town in the Oromia Region of Ethiopia

== See also ==
- Seki (disambiguation)
