= Gawa =

Gawa may refer to:

- Gawa, Elcho Island, Australia
- Green Actors of West Africa, a network of environmental organisations
- Green and White Army, supporters of the Northern Ireland football team
- Guardians and Wards Act, an Act of the Parliament of India
- -gawa, a suffix meaning "river" in place names in Japan

== See also ==
- Arabic coffee (Arabic: قهوة عربية, translit. qahwah arabiyya)
