= Ryan Mountain =

Mountain in the American state of California

Coordinates: 33°59′10″N 116°08′05″W

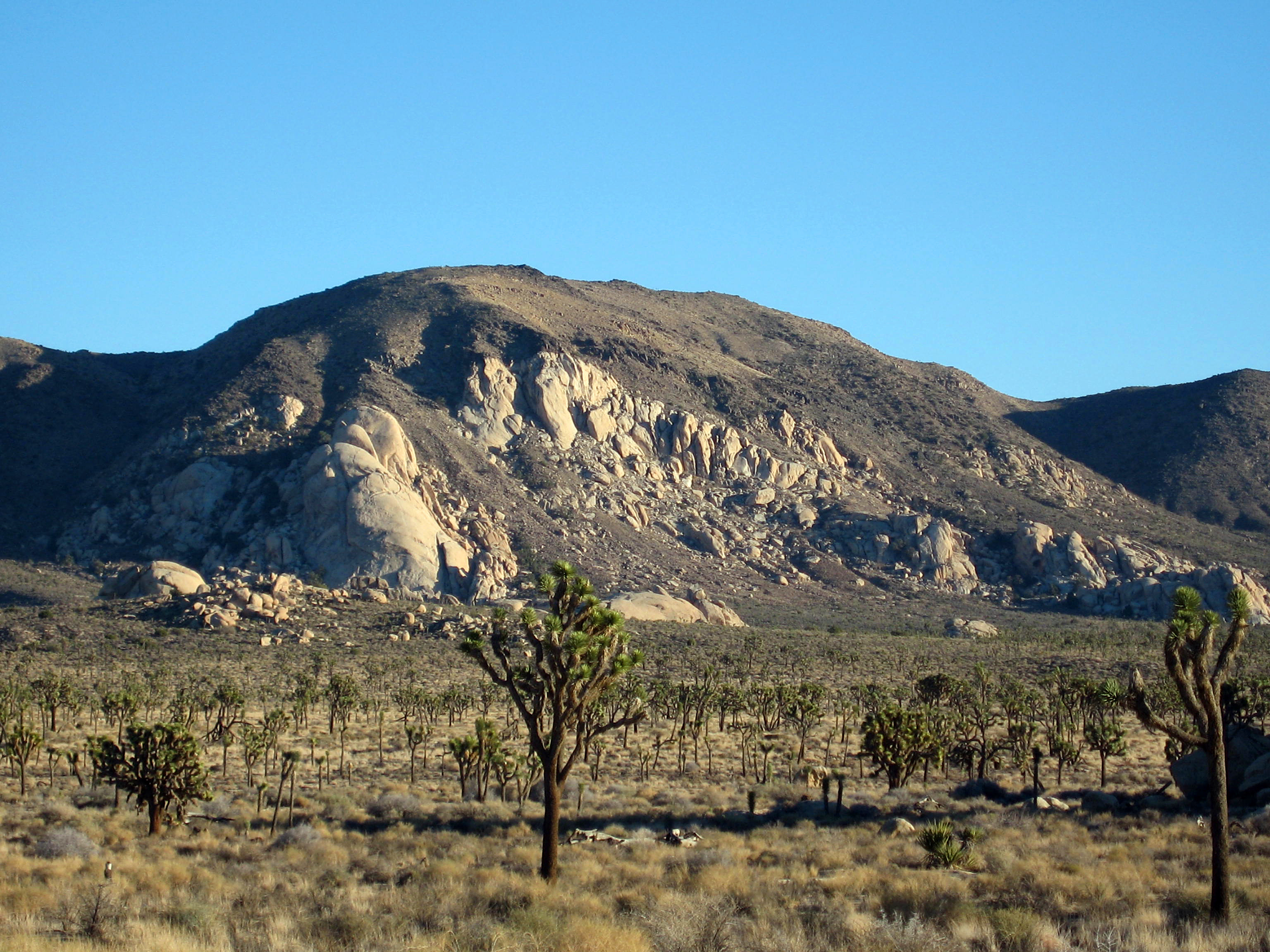
Ryan Mountain

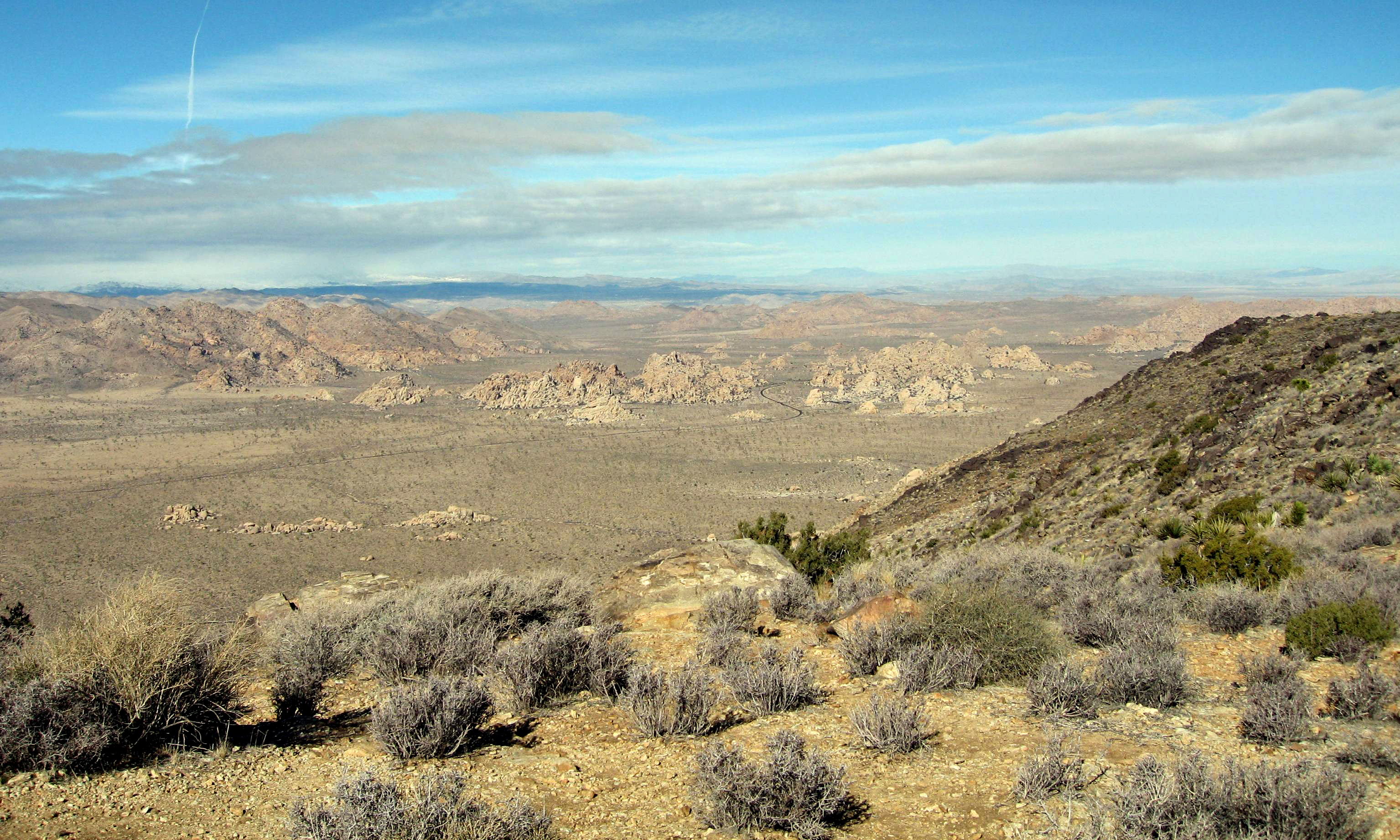
View from the top

Ryan Mountain is a 5,456-foot-high (1,663 m) mountain in Joshua Tree National Park. The trail to the peak is a strenuous hike, ascending 1,050 feet (320 m) in 1.5 miles (2.4 km). Ryan Mountain is a popular attraction in the park, because it leads to panoramic views of Pinto Basin, Lost Horse Valley, Queen Valley, and Pleasant Valley. It is one of the locations in Joshua Tree that features abundant lichen populations. It is named after J.D. Ryan, a wealthy rancher and early mining operator in the park.
