= Ryan House and Lost Horse Well =

- U.S. National Register of Historic Places
- U.S. Historic district
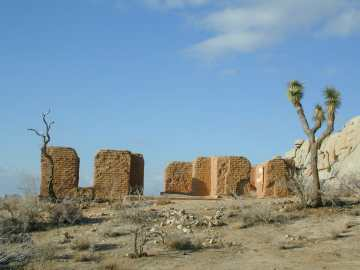

- Location within California Location within the United States
- Nearest city: Twentynine Palms, California
- Coordinates: 33°59′6″N 116°8′52″W
- Built: 1890
- NRHP reference No.: 75000175
- Added to NRHP: June 5, 1975

The Ryan House and Lost Horse Well are historic ruins in Joshua Tree National Park, California, United States. It was established by the family of J.D. Ryan, the later developers of the Lost Horse Mine, which became the most profitable mine in the area. The Lost Horse Well at the Ryan Ranch supplied water to the Lost Horse Mine, 3 miles (5 km) south and 750 feet (230 m), by pipeline. The popular park destination Ryan Mountain is named after him.

The six-room house was built as an adobe residence in 1896 with later wood frame additions. It was destroyed by fire August 12, 1978. Originally roughly 30 by 40 feet (9 by 12 m), the ruin has three rooms, each measuring 12 feet (4 m) wide and 16 feet (5 m) long. Adobe walls sit on stone masonry foundation, and there are concrete stoops on the north and south sides. There is a small stone fireplace located on the east side of the house.

A small cemetery is near the ranch with about 10 graves.

Ryan was a wealthy rancher who in 1895, bought out one of the main mining interests in the area from Johnny Lang. He located a steam-powered mill, large at the time, near the Colorado River, then had it disassembled to move it to the Lang mine site. In this desert area, he was able to provide the steam for the mill by building a 3.5 mile long, 2" pipeline from wells at his local ranch, now a historic site known as Ryan House and Lost Horse Well, to a reservoir near the mill. Fuel to run the pumps piping the water up the needed 750 feet (230 m) elevation gain was provided from burning trees from nearby desert mountains. The deforestation that resulted is still visible in 2014, in the denuded hills.
