= Lost Horse Mine =

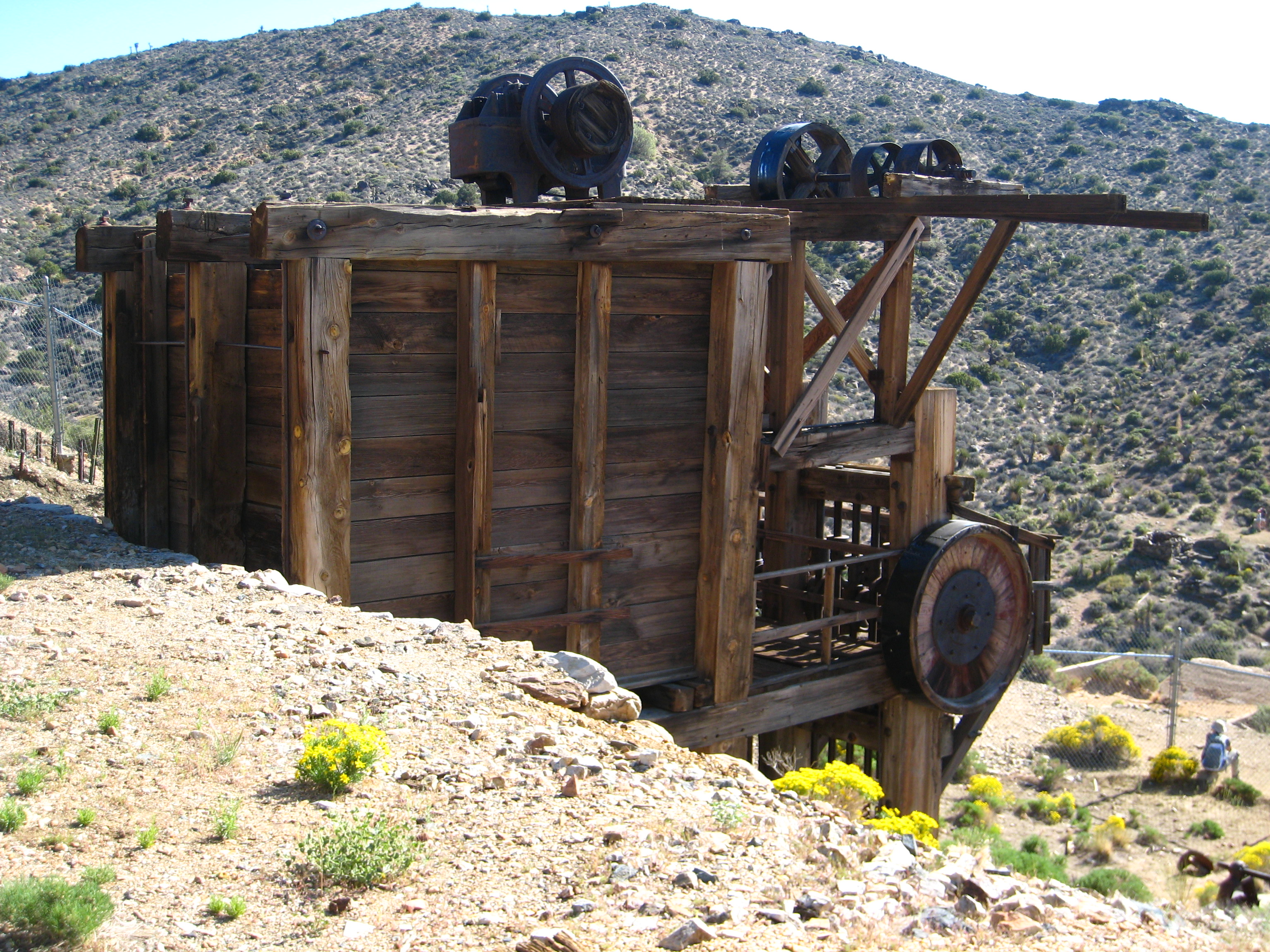
Lost Horse Mine

Lost Horse Mine is a historic gold and silver mine in the Lost Horse Valley of Joshua Tree National Park. Between 1894 and 1931, it produced 10,000 ounces of gold and 16,000 ounces of silver. It was first developed by Johnny Lang, then by J.D. Ryan. Scarce resources for steam powered pumps and mining equipment, led to denuding the local mountains of trees, which is still clearly visible in 2014.

Johnny Lang was an American cattle driver who claimed that he had moved to the area with his father because his brother had been gunned down in New Mexico with six other cowboys. In 1890, in the process of herding their cattle, they lost their horses in what is now known as Lost Horse Valley. He tracked them to what is now known as Keys Desert Queen Ranch, which at that time was believed to be occupied by cattle rustlers from what known as the McHaney Gang, but did not find the horses. He then claimed he then met "Dutch" Frank, who claimed he discovered a rich gold claim but was afraid to develop it because he had been threatened by the purported rustlers. Lang and his father bought the rights to the mine, purportedly for $1,000.00, and named it "Lost Horse". He claimed to have taken on three partners as back-up, out of fear of the gang of purported rustlers or having his claim jumped. The four men filed their claim, set up a two-stamp mill and began to produce substantial amounts of gold. Lang's claim and mill were then sold to a Montana rancher named J.D. Ryan. Much of this history was provided by longtime Joshua Tree area resident William F. Keys, for whom Keys Ranch was named.
