= Shiki District =

Shiki District may refer to:

- Shiki District, Afghanistan, of Badakhshan Province in Afghanistan
- Shiki District, Nara, of Nara Prefecture in Japan

== See also ==
- Shaki District, a district in Azerbaijan
