= Hajime Seki =

Japanese politician (1873–1935)

- 關 一
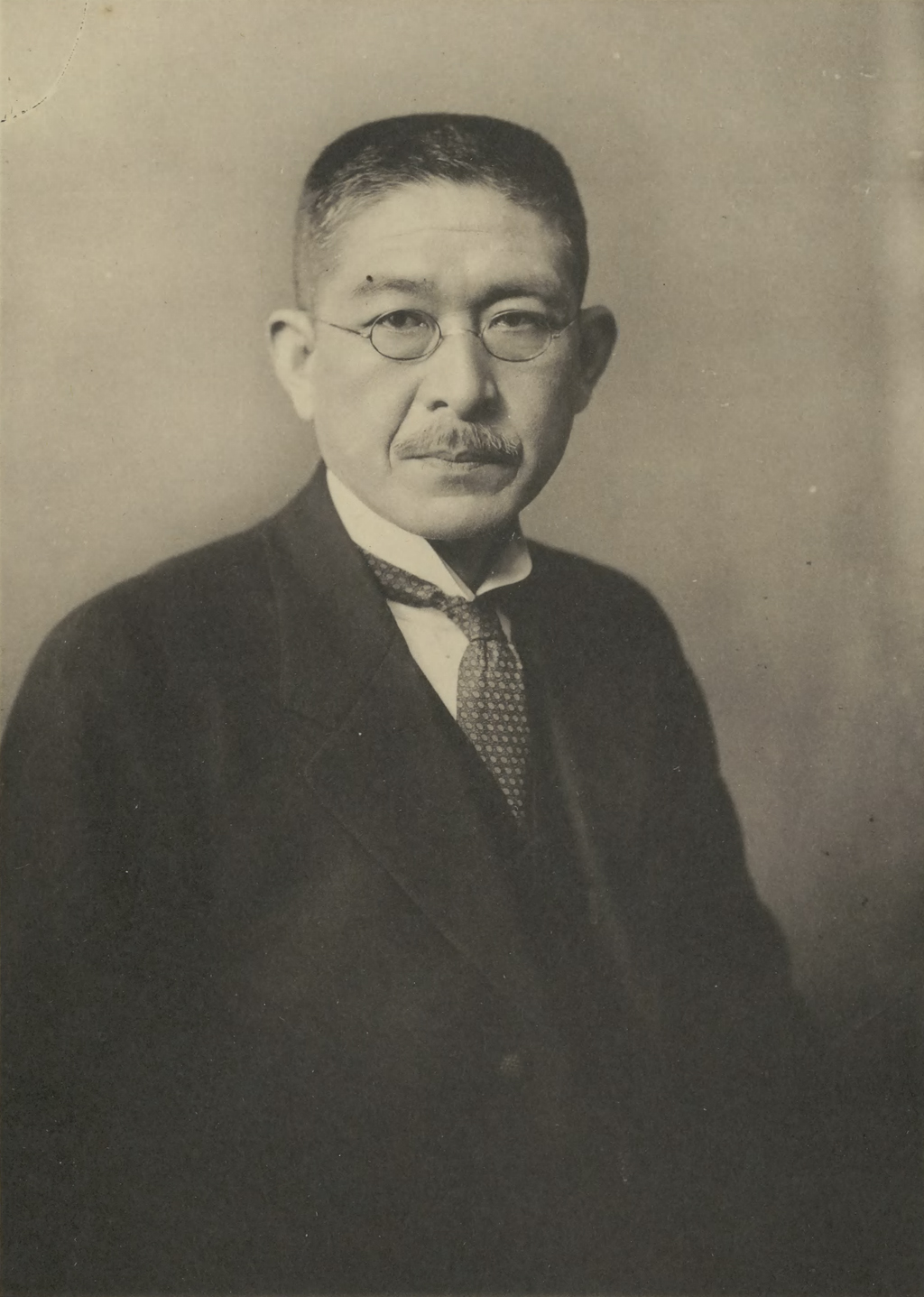

Mayor of Osaka
- In office 30 November 1923 – 26 January 1935
- Preceded by: Shirou Ikegami
- Succeeded by: Takeo Kagami

Member of the House of Peers
- In office 3 July 1934 – 26 January 1935 Nominated by the Emperor

Personal details
- Born: 26 September 1873 Izu Peninsula, Shizuoka, Japan
- Died: 26 January 1935 (aged 61) Tennōji, Osaka, Japan
- Party: Independent
- Relatives: Junichi Seki (grandson)
- Education: Tokyo University of Commerce

Hajime Seki (關 一, Seki Hajime; 26 September 1873 — 26 January 1935) was the Mayor of Osaka, Japan, between 1923 and 1935.

== Early life ==
Seki was born on the Izu Peninsula in Shizuoka on 26 September 1873. He graduated from the Koto Shogyo Gakko, now Hitotsubashi University, in 1893, and worked in the Ministry of Finance until he became a professor at his alma mater in 1897. The following year, he left for Europe, where he spent three years studying in Belgium. In 1910, he obtained the title of Doctor of Juridical Science.

== Mayor of Osaka ==
He became the Deputy Mayor of Osaka in 1914 before serving as Mayor from 1923 to 1935. He was instrumental in both the development of social capital, including the construction of ports and railways, and the implementation of urban social policy, including the establishment of public markets, the construction of city-provided housing and the establishment of the Osaka University of Commerce. He is most famous for overseeing the widening of the Midosuji, the avenue that stretches through the heart of Osaka. and the construction of the Osaka Subway Midosuji Line, which runs under the avenue.

Hajime Seki died of typhus on 26 January 1935, one year after he had been appointed to the House of Peers. He was 61.
