= Şəkili, Goychay =

Village in Goychay Rayon, Azerbaijan

Şəkili is a village and municipality in the Goychay Rayon of Azerbaijan. It has a population of 316.

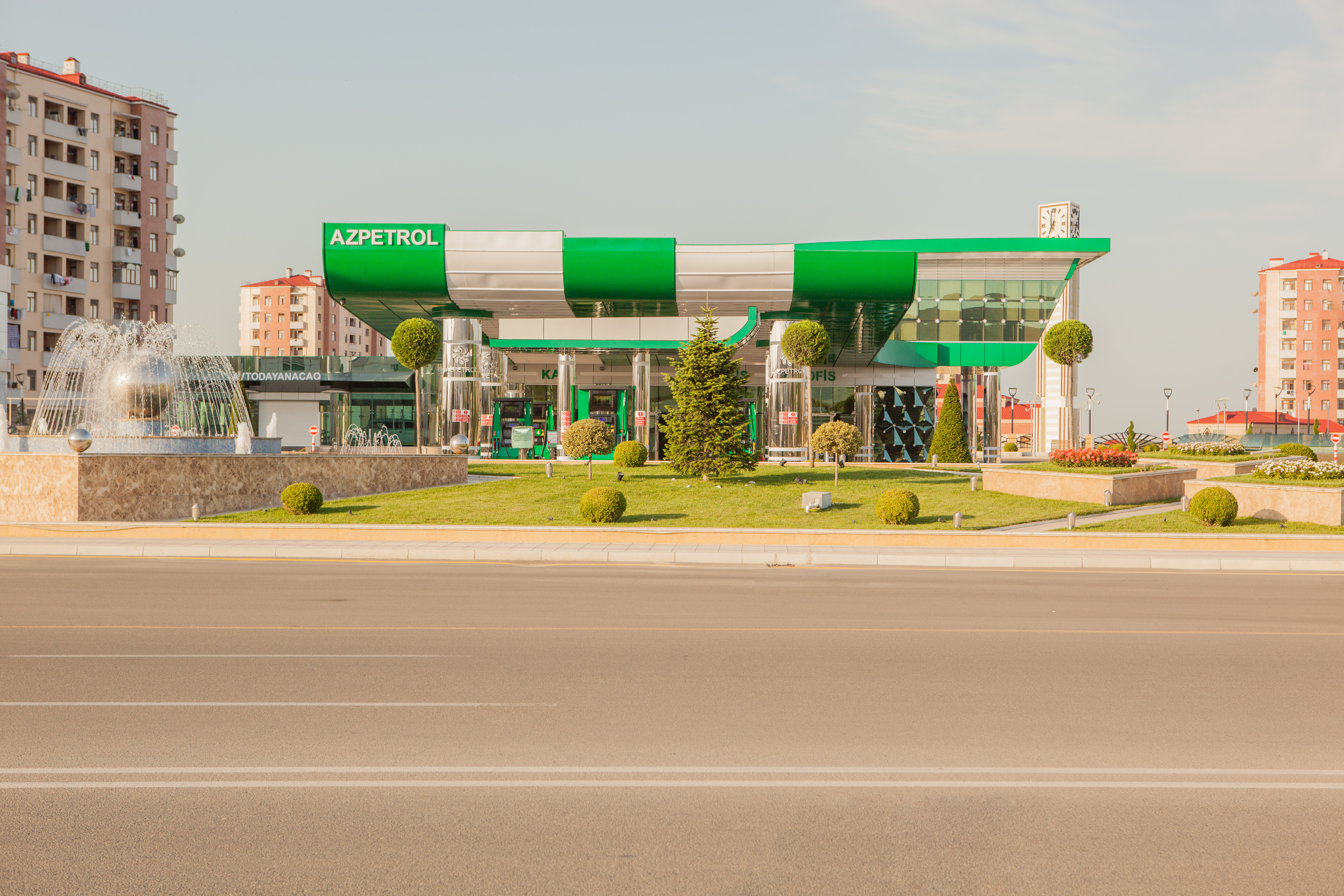
AZPETROL YDM
