= Tokio Seki =

Japanese actor and voice actor

- 関 時男
- Born: August 15, 1944 (age 82); Tokyo, Japan
- Occupations: Actor; voice actor
- Years active: 1969-present

Tokio Seki (関 時男, Seki Tokio; born August 15, 1944) is a Japanese actor and voice actor from Tokyo Metropolis. He is a graduate of the art department of Nihon University and is affiliated with Serikawa Office. He was previously affiliated with Gekidan Subaru.

== Filmography ==
=== Television drama ===
- Abarenbō Shōgun III (Harukichi)
- Haru no Hatō (Newspaper reporter)
- Musashi (Old man)
- Sangamoyu (Civil defense worker)
- Uchū Keiji Shariban (Mysterious old man)

=== Film ===
- Hana-bi (Old hick)
- Madame to Nyōbō (Musician)

=== Theatrical animation ===
- Alice in Wonderland (Cheshire Cat)
- Dumbo (Stork)
- The Sword in the Stone (Pellinor)
- 101 Dalmatians II: Patch's London Adventure (Police Sergeant)
- Hercules
- Tarzan (Gbeedul)
- Tarzan 2 (Gbeedul)
- Tarzan and Jane (Gbeedul)
- The Jungle Book (Monkey C)
- The Jungle Book 2 (Monkey C)
- The Many Adventures of Winnie the Pooh (Pony Canyon edition) (Eeyore)
- The Rescuers Down Under (Frank)
- The Black Cauldon
- The Small One
- Pocahontas II: Journey to a New World
- Lady and the Tramp II: Scamp's Adventure (Zero)
- Monsters, Inc. (Claws)
- A Bug's Life (Molt)
- Disney productions (Pony Canyon and Bandai editions) (Donald Duck)
- Pinocchio (Pony Canyon edition) (J. Worthington "Honest John" Foulfellow)
- Peter Pan (Pony Canyon edition) (Pirates Herius)
- Peter and the Wolf (Pony Canyon edition) (Ivan)
- Robin Hood (Pony Canyon edition) (Richard King)
- Bongo (Pony Canyon edition) (Circus Master)
- Song of the South (Pony Canyon edition) (Br'er Fox)
- Song of the South 2 (Pony Canyon edition) (Br'er Fox)

=== Other ===
- Mickey Mouse Revue (Donald Duck)
