= Şəki (village) =

Village in Shaki Rayon, Azerbaijan

Coordinates: 41°12′N 47°10′E

Şəki is a village and municipality in the Shaki Rayon of Azerbaijan. It has a population of 2,360.
