= Lost Horse Valley =

Valley in Riverside County, California, United States

Coordinates: 34°0′5.19″N 116°10′40.02″W

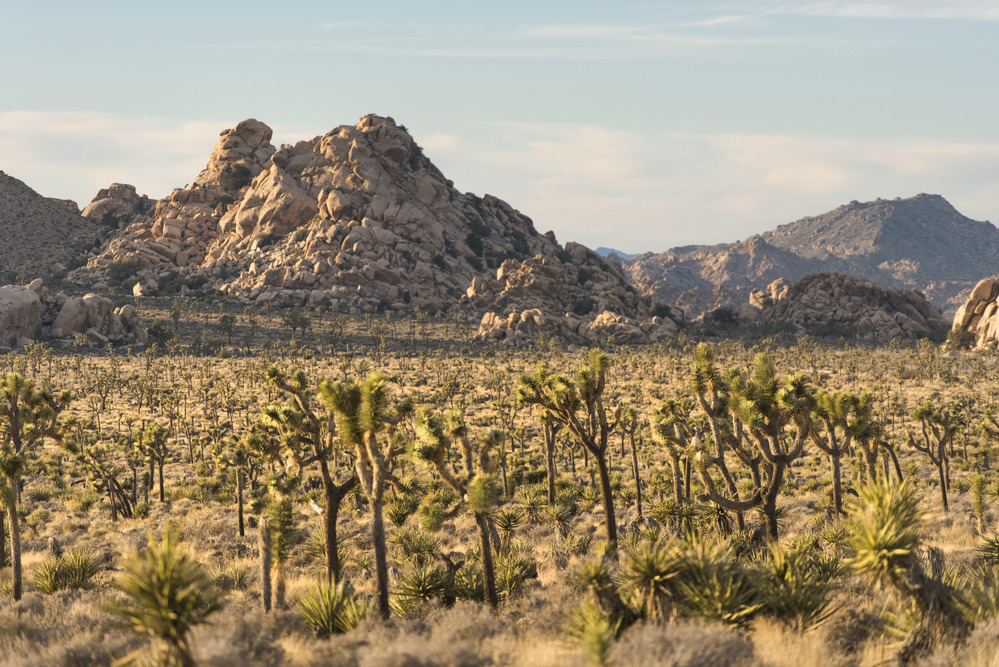
Joshua trees and rock outcrops at Lost Horse Valley.

Lost Horse Valley is a valley in Joshua Tree National Park. It has been called "the centerpiece of the park" because of the quality of its stands of Joshua trees and its geological formations. It contains the Lost Horse Mine, of significant historic importance in the park.
