= NGOs in West Africa =

NGOs in West Africa are divided into three categories: African national NGOs, African international NGOs, and non-African international NGOs. NGOs stand for non-governmental organizations. These organizations dominantly work independently from the government, and have specific aims that range from human rights, finance, health, education and more. There are many non-governmental organizations in West Africa, (West African Sahel includes: Burkina Faso, Benin, Cameroon, Togo, Ghana, Ivory Coast, Liberia, Mali, Mauritania, Niger, Nigeria, Sierra Leone, Guinea, Guinea-Bissau, and Senegal) and much activity between these countries, organizations and the rest of the world.

The history of non-governmental organizations starts most prominently after colonization. Due to land redistribution, new labor laws and the reconstructive government under colonial rule, NGOs started gradually overtime to protect the well-being of indigenous west African inhabitants, but data and recordings of these instances are quite limited.

Most data on NGOs in the Sahel begin in the 1970s. Due to the independence movements, climate issues, economic issues of the time, and civil rights movements in the United States, led to a dramatic introduction of foreign powers in the Sahel. The combination of the oil embargo by the Middle East and The Great West African Drought had mixed effects in the Sahel. With the Niger River that ran very low leading to a migration of farmers and nomads into major cities; foreign powers soon provided economic relief and humanitarian aid to the Sahel, ranging from American, German, Soviet and NATO organizations. This proved to be a part of a larger relief effort that was heavily influenced by the Cold War and the Arms Race. Foreign governments provided a majority of emergency aid but overtime foreign government involvement became foreign voluntary agencies which eventually solidified as NGOs that took on the mantle of providing aid.

African born NGOs later started developing to an international scale in the 1980s and 90s, growing to a point of African International recognition and solidarity. These groups were formed mostly due to the sudden push for democratization, economic, or climate issues, like ECOWAS and GAWA.

== Impact of African national non-governmental organizations (NGOs) in West Africa ==
Non-governmental organizations, NGOs can work in different capacities but essentially are designed to work autonomously from the government at either local, state, national, or international levels. Overarchingly, NGOs are meant to be, "formal..., non-profit..., self-governing..., voluntary..." organizations. This description will help provide a foundation for how these characteristics are applied to West African national NGOs.

In the 1980s, West African countries- such as Ghana, Côte d'Ivoire, and Liberia- were pushed to implement "neoliberal economic reforms" and had begun doing so. Later in the 1990s, the three countries made efforts to implement "democratic reforms". While these countries tried, the lasting effects of colonization destabilized the states' capacity to provide for its citizens; therefore, highlighting non-state organizations, like NGOs, to fulfill the peoples' need for basic resources. The region's colonial history prompted the increased creation of non-state sources of support, which has been similarly replicated into modern-day. This increased need of non-state resources has led to, "... new inequalities of access and complex mechanisms of accountability for African citizens...".

This colonial legacy has not only increased the need for non-state resources but also has made it difficult for West African/African national NGOs to work. As a result, national NGOs engage in "grey practices" where they promote state accountability but also engage in corruption. This example shows how the region and continent continues to be impacted by European colonization years later.

One way in which West African national NGOs have developed over time is how they obtain financial aid for their organizations. Given the limited research concerning West African NGOs, scholarship about West African national NGOs and their ability to adapt to the evolving financial aid system in less accessible. However, West African national NGOs- specifically Ghanaian NGOs- are quite active and, "...are innovating, adjusting, and responding in various ways to remain sustainable". In the 1990s, international donors decided to focus their donations to national NGOs instead of international NGOs or state governments because national NGOs were perceived as well-structured vehicles to serve local communities and not as prone to corruption. In recent years the perspective of national NGOs in West Africa has changed, and they have been criticized for prioritizing their Western donors over the local communities they serve.

West African national NGOs have provided support to their corresponding country's education sectors and infrastructure. For example, in Ghana, religious NGOs assist with, "... public infrastructure development, such as building schools, roads, wells, and boreholes". National NGOs can help bridge disparity gaps that national governments have not been able to reach and remedy.

Examples of West African national NGOs will be listed down below divided by Human Rights, Finance and Development, Health, and Environment based organizations made to promote change within their corresponding sectors.

=== Human Rights ===
==== Women's rights ====
- Association des Femmes Juristes du Bénin:
  - In Benin: (Association of Women Lawyers of Benin - AFJB); NGO focused on educating women on their legal rights
- BAOBAB
  - In Nigeria BAOBAB Women is an NGO focuses on support for victims of Domestic Violence, and advocates for Gender Rights
- Equitas
  - Based in Burkina Faso, Equitas is an NGO that focuses on gender equality and education - deconstructing social norms and gender stereotypes

===== Civil rights =====
- Christian Action for the Abolition of Torture-Benin or ACAT-B
  - Based in Benin, ACAT-B is a subgroup of the larger international group ACAT, that is dedicated to ending the death penalty, cruel, and unusual punishment for incarcerated citizens
- Ligue pour la Défense des Droits de l'Homme au Bénin
  - Based in Benin, the League for the Defense of Human Rights in Benin or LDH, promotes human rights across the country

===== LGBTQ+ Rights =====
- Bénin Synergie Plus Network (BESYP)
  - Based in Benin, BESYP is an organization dedicated to fighting AIDS and promoting health for LGBTQ+ citizens
- Ong Tous Nes Libres et Egaux
  - Based in Benin, Ong Tous Nes Libres et Egaux (TNLE) or All Born Free and Equal is an NGO that works for the promotion of human rights and the fight against STIs, HIV/AIDS
- Youth Arise
  - Based in Sierra Leone, Youth Arise is a non-profit organization that advocates for gay rights, and supports the LGBT/MSM community with resources and education opportunities
- SAIL
  - Stop AIDS in Liberia was the first NGO founded by LGBTQ citizens, to educate gay men on HIV/AIDS prevention, and provide counseling for LGBTQ+ community
- Centre for Popular Education and Human Rights, Ghana (CEPEHRG)
  - Based in Accra, Ghana, CEPEHRG is a NGO that aims to aid in the health of LGBTQ+ citizens and advocate for LGBTQ+ civil rights
- Sourire Des Femme
  - An NGO based in Senegal, focused on upholding feminism, and ending discrimination for women in LBQWSW community (Lesbian, Bisexual, Queer, and Women who have Sex with women)

=== Finance/Economy/Development ===
- Association pour le Développement des Initiatives Villageoises
  - Based in Benin, The Association for the Development of Village Initiatives (ASSODIV)
- Association des Jeunes Engagés pour l'Action Humanitaire (Togo)
  - AJEAH or Association of Engaged Youth for Humanitarian Action is a development NGO aimed at improving quality of life and sustainable development
- La Banque Mondial Mauritanie
  - Based in Mauritania, La Bank Mondial Mauritanie, or The Mauritanian World Bank is a subgroup of the World Bank and is an NGO focused on gaining investments into the agriculture, telecommunications and energy sectors
- Tenmiya
  - Tenmiya is an NGO based in Mauritania, that aims to invest in water, energy, and environmental sectors of the rural and peri-urban parts of the country with microfinancing, to help end poverty

=== Health ===
- Mentally Aware Nigeria Initiative
  - Non-profit Mental Health organization based in Nigeria, aimed at deconstructing mental health stigmas and providing resources for youth groups that struggle with mental health
- POD-Mali
  - POD-Mali or Peace One Day Mali! is an NGO that works in healthcare, Nutrition, Food Security, and peacebuilding for children affected by war and conflict
- Never Alone Principle Defenders
  - Never Alone Principle Defenders is a Health-based NGO in Côte d'Ivoire or Ivory Coast aimed at ending alcoholism and drug abuse in the region (also called ADAPP)
- Sante Espoir Vie Cote d'Ivoire (SEV-CI)
  - Sante Espoir Vie aka Health Hope and Life is a national NGO based in the Ivory Coast aimed at disease prevention and aid, as well as childbirth and maternal healthcare

=== Education ===
- AHAVA Women Empowerment Initiative
  - NGO based in Benin whose main purpose is legal rights education for women
- Institut des Droits de l'Homme et de Promotion de la Démocratie
  - Based In Benin, Institute for Human Rights and the Promotion of Democracy (IDH) focuses on human rights education
- EduShine Education Foundation
  - Based in Nigeria, EduShine is an NGO that focuses on youth education in science and technology in the region
- DrDoe Foundation:
  - Based in Nigeria, DrDoe is an NGO that advocates for health education
- OrphanHub Foundation:
  - Based in Nigeria, OrphanHub is an NGO that focuses on empowering orphans, disabled children, and underprivileged youths with digital and technology skills in Nigeria and across other Africa countries.

=== Environment ===
- Green Care Association or GCA
  - Based in Cameroon, GCA organizes environment and development projects for local communities and volunteers which include sustainable agriculture education and training, tree planting, and environmental education
- Ape Action Africa
  - Based in Cameroon, Ape Action Africa is an NGO aimed at saving endangered primates from going extinct

== Impact of African international non-governmental organizations (INGOs) in West Africa ==
International non-governmental organizations (INGOs) can be defined as NGOs who work autonomously from the government in the international realm. Furthermore, INGOs can be described as, "... 'any internationally operating organization which is not established by inter-governmental agreement'". Therefore, INGOs are not born from any international contract.

INGOs tend to locate themselves in major cities. For example, Ghanaian NGOs and INGOs are known to have their organizations' headquarters in Ghana's capital, Accra. However, there are some differences between NGOs and INGOs to consider. Firstly, while West African national NGOs do have their headquarters in massive cities, they also establish them outside massive cities and instead in, "smaller communities'', unlike INGOs. Secondly, NGOs area of focus is either local, state, or national (wiki NGO article) while INGOs deal with projects on an international level.

Advocacy-based West African NGOs have been critical of the international community's attempt to promote civil society in the countries within the region describing these efforts as a "... briefing rather than a dialogue...". As a result, these international interventions have failed to produce meaningful policy changes and continue to be Western-focused. While Western organizations- such as the World Trade Organization (WTO)- have made it more difficult for West African INGOs to advocate and impact policy on an international level, they have found ways to circumvent these barriers. Instead of West African INGOs working within international bureaucratic constraints, they took an outside approach by using their non-governmental status to build international partnerships to impact policy.

Some ways in which INGOs have provided vital support is the creation of infrastructure for West African states that lack the ability to do so. For example, donors would fund INGOs located in "... countries recovering from civil war, such as Angola and Liberia..." instead of the state governments. Additionally, there are international NGOs that provide supportive services to survivors of sexual violence in the region. For example, these organizations have provided "... Medicare, psychological counseling and advocacy..." services for African females who were sexually assaulted in Northeast Nigeria. While non-African INGOs are more known for documenting sexual assault reports, West African INGOs play an essential role by supporting survivors on-on-one and confirming reports.

Lastly, a Kenyan based organization that has done work in West Africa called the Pan African Climate Justice Alliance (PACJA) has grown and expanded. The PACJA has been heavily involved in international discussions concerning the resources needed for developing African nations to address climate change. The INGO addressed in solidarity with other international groups at the COP15 Summit that developing nations do not have enough funding and resources to achieve their goals to combat climate change. The PACJA has also made international partnerships specifically in the West African region. For example, in 2013, the organization created a new branch in The Gambia to join efforts in combatting climate change. The PACJA worked "in collaboration with the Department of Water Resources and the University of the Gambia" to implement this new branch of the PACJA.

There are multiple West African INGOs that promote certain non-governmental projects. They are listed down below and divided by Human Rights, Development, Finance/Economy, Environment, and Health.

=== Human Rights ===
- Pride Equality International
  - Based in Sierra Leone, PEI is an NGO focused on securing LGBTQ+ rights in Sierra Leone, Liberia and Guinea
- West African Human Rights Defenders Network (WAHRDN)
  - Based in Togo WAHRDN is an NGO that forms coalitions between countries to shape domestic and foreign policy on human rights
- The African Center for Democracy and Human Rights Studies (ACHRD)
  - Based in Gambia, ACHRD is an organization that promotes the maintaining and promotion of democracy and human rights
- Make Every Woman Count (MEWC)
  - Based in Guinea, MEWC is a women-led NGO that documents the status of women's rights in Africa
- Voix Les Femmes
  - Based in Burkina Faso, VDF or Voices of Women is an NGO that protects and promotes cultural, legal rights, political rights and socio-economic rights of girls and women

=== Development/Finance/Economy ===
- VPWA
  - VPWA or Volunteer Partnerships for West Africa is based in Ghana
- Reseau Des Femmes Leaders Pour Le Development (RFLD)
  - Based in Togo, RFLD or Network of Women for Female Leaders for Development; and NGO that focuses on sustainable development and gender equality
- African Business Women Organization

=== Education ===
- Ane Osiobe International Foundation
  - Based in Abuja, Nigeria, Ane Osiobe International Foundation focuses on education, health and youth
- Leading Youth, Sports & Development Project
  - Based in Togo and Ivory Coast, the LYSD Project is an NGO that aims to promote education and sports in order to create a strong youth community that crosses ethnic cleavages

=== Environment ===
- The Green Actors of West Africa or GAWA
- The Pan African Climate Justice Alliance
  - Based in Kenya but has conducted partnerships with Gambia, The Pan African Climate Justice Alliance

=== Health ===
- Based in Ghana and across West Africa, West Africa AIDS Foundation
- Health Alliance International

== Impact of Non-African NGOs (NAINGO) in West Africa ==
Non-African, Western and Soviet Organizations have all been present in the Sahel since the late 1960s and 70s. Most of these organizations take three forms during that time, state-centered developmentalism, entrepreneurial, and post-colonial solidarity.

The state-centered developmental organizations worked in close contact with government organizations abroad and in different West African countries. They advocated mostly for neoliberal policies, and humanitarian incentives, mainly in Nigeria, Niger and Mali.

Entrepreneurial NGOs worked with African governments to create a new political forms and economic strategies for the advancement of both countries. Main examples of these in the 1970s were CARE or the Cooperative American Relief Everywhere organization who strongly advocated for entrepreneurial efforts through a more open political space. These were very governmental as the Nigerian scholar and NGO worker, Boureima Alpha Gado, once said that, "[CARE Mali] was a state within a state". By the late 1980s CARE was closely associated with USAID and assumed some governmental tasks. FRIENDS was another organization in the 70s that practiced social experiments in settling displaced nomads from the Niger River Drought to a new village under the "Tin Aicha" project.

Post-Colonial solidarity NGOs started to spring up in the Sahel due to a rise in Pan-Africanism and civil rights movements in the United States and Europe. Its main actors being RAINS and AFASPA. RAINS, also known as Africare & Relief for Africans In Need in the Sahel, is an African American organization based on racial solidarity and humanitarian aid to west Africa. AFASPA, also known as Association Française d'Amite et de Solidarite avec les Peuple d'Afrique, or the Comite d'Enformation Sahel, this organization was based on a labor movement through a Marxist lens.

International NGOs in the beginning of their advancements were divided between solidarity and international interests, but today we see more proliferation of non-profit humanitarian causes in West Africa as well as more involvement from China. With a broader scope of goals and purposes.

=== Human Rights ===
- Tostan International
  - Subgroup organization headquartered in Senegal, educational program for rural areas
- Human Rights Watch
  - Human Rights Watch is a U.S based NGO working in many African countries including; Burkina Faso, Cameroon, Ivory Coast, Gambia, Liberia, Niger, Mali, Ghana and Guinea)
- Amnesty International
  - Amnesty International is a U.K. based human rights NGO focused on protecting free speech and other human rights and reporting human rights abuse
- Royal Commonwealth Society for the Blind
  - A U.K based NGO focused on protecting disabled citizens' rights around the world
- WAO - Afrique
  - Women's Aid Organization, is a Belgian-based NGO, officially recognized by multiple African governments (ex: Togolese Government recognized in 1990), it even has observer status with the African Commission of Human Rights and People's Rights

=== Health Based ===
- The Red Cross
- Doctors Without Borders
- Bill and Melinda Gates Foundation
- The Hunger Project
  - The Hunger Project is an international, non-pro fit organization

=== Development Based ===
- CARE
- International Institute for Environment and Development
