= Koji Seki (disambiguation) =

Koji Seki or Kōji Seki may refer to:

- Koji Seki (born 1972), former Japanese football player
- Kōji Seki (born 1911), Japanese film director

== See also ==
- Koji (disambiguation)
