= Kunio Hiramatsu =

Japanese mayor (born 1948)

- 平松 邦夫
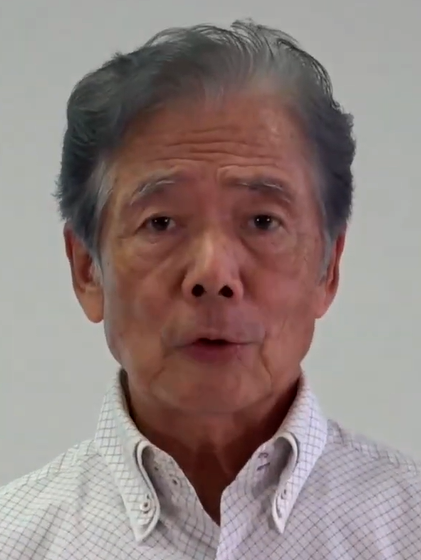
- Hiramatsu in 2021

Mayor of Osaka
- In office 19 December 2007 – 18 December 2011
- Preceded by: Junichi Seki
- Succeeded by: Tōru Hashimoto

Personal details
- Born: 15 November 1948 (age 77) Amagasaki, Hyōgo, Japan
- Party: Independent
- Education: Doshisha University Law School
- Occupation: Television personality, Mainichi Broadcasting System
- Profession: Announcer
- Website: http://www.hiramatsu-osaka.com/

Kunio Hiramatsu (平松 邦夫, Hiramatsu Kunio; born 15 November 1948) is a Japanese politician who served as the mayor of Osaka in Japan. He was elected in 2007 with centre-left support from the Democratic Party of Japan (DPJ), People's New Party and the Social Democratic Party, defeating the centre-right supported incumbent Jun'ichi Seki by 50,000 votes.

Hiramatsu unsuccessfully ran for re-election in Osaka's mayoral election on 27 November 2011, when his challenger was the former Osaka Governor Tōru Hashimoto. Despite support from both major Japanese national parties (the DPJ and the Liberal Democratic Party), and the Japanese Communist Party retracting their candidate to support his re-election bid, Hiramatsu lost to Hashimoto by a margin of well over 200,000 votes.

Political offices
Preceded by Junichi Seki	Mayor of Osaka City; 2007–2011	Succeeded by Tōru Hashimoto
