= Green and White Army =

Fans of the Northern Ireland national football team

The Green and White Army are fans that follow the Northern Ireland national football team, noted for their passionate support.

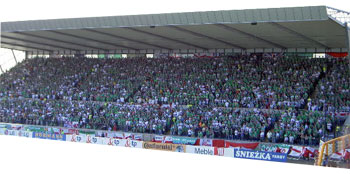
Green and White Army

The support at Windsor Park, the home of the Northern Ireland national football team, is sometimes referred to as the team's "12th man". After Northern Ireland beat England 1-0 at Windsor Park on 7 September 2005, the manager Lawrie Sanchez said "The fans were also magnificent and we played with an extra man - they raised the team, they believed in the team and the team gave it back in bundles."

The Amalgamation of Official Northern Ireland Supporters Clubs acts as the recognised voice of the Green and White Army and co-ordinates many activities on their behalf. In addition, it regularly articulates the views of fans to the Irish Football Association and liaises with other fans groups such as the FSF. The group was formed in 1999, initially to co-ordinate the activities of the various independent supporters clubs which existed at the time, but has now evolved into a much larger organisation which represents over 60 clubs with over 2,000 members.

The Green and White Army received recognition for its work in promoting "football for all" in Northern Ireland by being awarded the internationally recognised Brussels International Supporters Award. The award was presented to representatives of the Northern Ireland supporters on 6 September 2006, the same day Northern Ireland played against Spain and won 3-2.

== Other uses ==
There are also other clubs who call their fans the 'green and white army', including Yeovil Town in the English Football League Two. Other teams include Celtic from the Scottish Premier League and Hibernian from the Scottish Premiership and Shamrock Rovers in the League of Ireland.
