= Şəkili, Agdash =

Şəkili
- Municipality
- Location within Azerbaijan
- Coordinates: 40°42′35″N 47°23′41″E
- Country: Azerbaijan
- Rayon: Agdash

Population
  - Total: 1,023
- Time zone: UTC+4 (AZT)
  - Summer (DST): UTC+5 (AZT)

Şəkili (also, Shekili) is a village and municipality in the Agdash Rayon of Azerbaijan. It has a population of 1,023.
