= Junichi Seki =

Japanese politician (1935–2024)

- 關 淳一
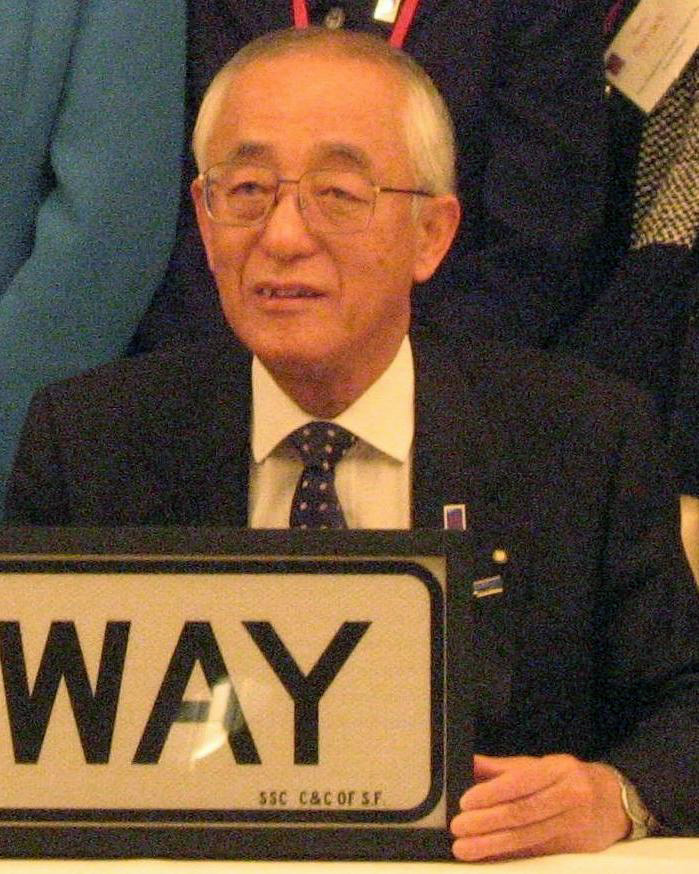
- Seki in 2007

Mayor of Osaka
- In office 19 December 2003 – 18 December 2007
- Preceded by: Takafumi Isomura
- Succeeded by: Kunio Hiramatsu

Personal details
- Born: 13 August 1935 Osaka, Japan
- Died: 9 June 2024 (aged 88)
- Party: Independent
- Education: Osaka City University
- Occupation: Doctor

Junichi Seki (Japanese: 關 淳一 Seki Jun'ichi; 13 August 1935 – 9 June 2024) was a Japanese politician. An independent, he served as mayor of Osaka from 2003 to 2007.

Seki died on 9 June 2024, at the age of 88.
