= Takafumi Isomura =

Japanese politician (1930–2007)

- 磯村 隆文

Mayor of Osaka
- In office 19 December 1995 – 18 December 2003
- Preceded by: Masaya Nishio
- Succeeded by: Junichi Seki

Personal details
- Born: 8 December 1930 Osaka, Japan
- Died: 26 November 2007 (aged 76) Osaka, Japan
- Party: Independent
- Education: Osaka City University

Takafumi Isomura (磯村 隆文, Isomura Takafumi; 8 December 1930 – 26 November 2007) was a Japanese politician. He served as the former mayor of Osaka from 1995 until 2003 and professor emeritus of Osaka City University.

== Early life ==
Isomura was born in the city of Osaka and graduated from Osaka City University.

Isomura initially began his career as an economics professor at Osaka City University.

== Political career ==
He became vice mayor of Osaka in April 1990 at the request of former Osaka Mayor Masaya Nishio. Isomura succeeded Nishio when he was elected mayor in December 1995. One of Isomura's main goals during his time in office was to make Osaka the host city for the 2008 Summer Olympic Games. However, Osaka lost its bid to Beijing at the meeting of the International Olympic Committee in July 2001.

== Death ==
Takafumi Isomura died of hepatocellular carcinoma at a hospital in Osaka on 26 November 2007. He was 76 years old.

Preceded by Masaya Nishio	Mayor of Osaka; 1995–2003	Succeeded by Junichi Seki
