= National Register of Historic Places listings in San Bernardino County, California =

Location of San Bernardino County in California

This is a list of the National Register of Historic Places listings in San Bernardino County, California.

This is intended to be a complete list of the properties and districts on the National Register of Historic Places in San Bernardino County, California, United States. Latitude and longitude coordinates are provided for many National Register properties and districts; these locations may be seen together in an online map.

There are 115 properties and districts listed on the National Register in the county, including 1 National Historic Landmark.

This National Park Service list is complete through NPS recent listings posted September 4, 2026.

== Current listings ==
	Name on the Register	Image	Date listed	Location	City or town	Description
1	6 Mile Corral		April 26, 2021 (#100004572)	Morningstar Mine Rd. in Mojave National Preserve; 35°18′34″N 115°27′15″W	Cima vicinity	
2	7IL Spring		June 24, 2026 (#100013169)	Mojave National Preserve (MOJA), north of Hole-in-the-Wall; 34°59′10″N 115°28′23″W	Essex vicinity	
3	8 Mile Corral		April 26, 2021 (#100004575)	Near Kelso-Cima Rd. in Mojave National Preserve; 35°09′54″N 115°31′50″W	Cima vicinity	
4	10 Mile Corral		April 26, 2021 (#100004573)	Morningstar Mine Rd. in Mojave National Preserve; 35°18′36″N 115°23′50″W	Cima vicinity	
5	A. K. Smiley Public Library	A. K. Smiley Public Library	December 12, 1976 (#76000513)	125 W. Vine St. 34°03′15″N 117°11′02″W	Redlands	
6	Aiken's Wash National Register District		May 24, 1982 (#82002239)	Mojave National Preserve; 35°14′22″N 115°44′55″W	Baker	
7	Alf's Blacksmith Shop		April 10, 2025 (#100011630)	33652 - 33678 1st Street; 34°51′52″N 116°53′12″W	Daggett	
8	Archeological Site CA SBR 3186		February 10, 1981 (#81000170)	Address Restricted	Silver Lakes	
9	Archeological Site CA-SBR-140		June 10, 2003 (#03000119)	Address Restricted	Baker	
10	Archeological Site No. D-4		October 25, 1985 (#85003435)	Address Restricted	Needles	
11	Archeological Site No. E-21		October 25, 1985 (#85003430)	Address Restricted	Parker	
12	Atchison, Topeka and Santa Fe Railway Passenger and Freight Depot	Atchison, Topeka and Santa Fe Railway Passenger and Freight Depot	February 2, 2001 (#01000025)	1170 W. 3rd St. 34°06′17″N 117°18′31″W	San Bernardino	
13	Auerbacher Home	Auerbacher Home	August 1, 2012 (#12000442)	121 Sierra Vista Dr. 34°01′18″N 117°09′02″W	Redlands	
14	Barnwell RSLCC Headquarters		April 26, 2021 (#100004577)	Hart Mine Rd. near Ivanpah Rd. in Mojave National Preserve; 35°17′31″N 115°14′10″W	Nipton vicinity	
15	Barnwell Corral and Wells		April 26, 2021 (#100004578)	Near Barnwell on Hart Mine Rd. in Mojave National Preserve; 35°17′25″N 115°13′37″W	Nipton vicinity	
16	Barton Villa	Barton Villa	October 24, 1996 (#96001176)	11245 Nevada St. 34°02′58″N 117°12′58″W	Redlands	
17	Beverly Ranch	Beverly Ranch	February 11, 2004 (#04000018)	923 W. Fern Ave. 34°02′39″N 117°11′16″W	Redlands	
18	Bitter Spring Archaeological Site (4-SBr-2659)		December 20, 1982 (#82000981)	Address Restricted	Barstow	
19	Black Canyon-Inscription Canyon-Black Mountain Rock Art District	Black Canyon-Inscription Canyon-Black Mountain Rock Art District	September 12, 2000 (#00001046)	Address Restricted	Hinkley	
20	Black Tank Corral		June 2, 2021 (#100004592)	Near I-15; 35°17′15″N 115°43′43″W	Baker vicinity	
21	Blackwater Well		November 21, 2000 (#00001326)	Granite Wells Road; 35°21′29″N 117°20′54″W	Red Mountain	
22	Bono's Restaurant and Deli	Bono's Restaurant and Deli	January 10, 2008 (#07001353)	15395 Foothill Blvd. 34°06′23″N 117°28′09″W	Fontana	
23	CA SBr 1008A, CA SBr 1008B, CA SBr 1008C		May 24, 1982 (#82002241)	Address Restricted	Johannesburg	
24	Calico Mountains Archeological District		March 30, 1973 (#73000430)	Address Restricted	Yermo	
25	The California Theatre	The California Theatre	December 22, 2009 (#09001116)	562 W. 4th St. 34°06′25″N 117°17′44″W	San Bernardino	
26	Carnegie Public Library Building	Carnegie Public Library Building	June 23, 1988 (#88000894)	380 N. La Cadena Dr. 34°04′08″N 117°19′22″W	Colton	Now houses Colton Area Museum
27	Chemehuevi Cemetery	Chemehuevi Cemetery	January 13, 2025 (#100011256)	Adobe Road, just northeast of the intersection with Sullivan Road. 34°07′44″N 116°03′15″W	Twentynine Palms	
28	City Transfer and Storage Company Warehouse	City Transfer and Storage Company Warehouse	October 23, 2023 (#100009474)	440 Oriental Ave. 34°03′31″N 117°11′17″W	Redlands	
29	Cottonwood Corral		April 26, 2021 (#100004571)	Near Morningstar Mine Rd. in Mojave National Preserve; 35°14′57″N 115°24′36″W	Cima vicinity	
30	Counsel Rocks		August 23, 2021 (#100006816)	Address Restricted	Essex vicinity (Mojave National Preserve)	
31	Cow Camp	Cow Camp	October 29, 1975 (#75000228)	Southwest of Twentynine Palms in Joshua Tree National Park; 34°02′15″N 116°10′02″W	Twentynine Palms	
32	Cow Cove		June 12, 2026 (#100013110)	Address Restricted	Essex vicinity	
33	Crowder Canyon Archeological District		June 16, 1976 (#76000514)	Address Restricted	San Bernardino	
34	Cucamonga Service Station	Cucamonga Service Station	July 23, 2018 (#100002675)	9670 Foothill Blvd. 34°06′24″N 117°35′39″W	Rancho Cucamonga	
35	Cut Spring Corral		December 1, 2025 (#100004567)	Near Cima Rd. 35°16′43″N 115°33′15″W	Cima vicinity	
36	Cut Tank Corral		April 26, 2021 (#100004570)	Near Morningstar Mine Rd. in Mojave National Preserve; 35°15′19″N 115°29′04″W	Cima vicinity	
37	Deer Spring Corral		April 29, 2021 (#100004590)	Near Cima Rd. in Mojave National Preserve; 35°17′07″N 115°36′40″W	Cima vicinity	
38	Dove Corral		April 26, 2021 (#100004579)	Remote location in New York Mountains in Mojave National Preserve; 35°22′15″N 115°11′51″W	Nipton vicinity	
39	Robert J. Dunn House	Robert J. Dunn House	July 24, 2017 (#100001336)	1621 Garden St. 34°01′48″N 117°09′32″W	Redlands	
40	Eagle Well Petroglyph Site		July 27, 2015 (#15000470)	Address Restricted	Barstow	
41	El Garces	El Garces	May 17, 2002 (#02000537)	950 Front St. 34°50′27″N 114°36′20″W	Needles	
42	Dr. Orville S. Ensign House	Dr. Orville S. Ensign House	March 20, 2012 (#12000126)	304 S. Laurel Ave. 34°03′39″N 117°39′09″W	Ontario	
43	Euclid Avenue	Euclid Avenue	August 10, 2005 (#05000843)	From 24th St. in Upland to Philadelphia St. in Ontario; 34°09′01″N 117°39′02″W	Upland and Ontario	
44	First Christian Church of Rialto	First Christian Church of Rialto	February 20, 2003 (#03000037)	201 N. Riverside Ave. 34°06′10″N 117°22′09″W	Rialto	
45	Fontana Farms Company Ranch House, Camp No. 1	Fontana Farms Company Ranch House, Camp No. 1	November 1, 1982 (#82000982)	8863 Pepper St. 34°05′34″N 117°26′28″W	Fontana	
46	Fontana Pit and Groove Petroglyph Site		April 17, 1980 (#80000838)	Address Restricted	Fontana	
47	Fossil Canyon Petroglyph Site	Fossil Canyon Petroglyph Site	March 3, 2003 (#02000980)	Rainbow Basin; 35°01′46″N 117°02′12″W	Barstow	
48	Foxtrot Petroglyph Site	Foxtrot Petroglyph Site	February 23, 1995 (#95000044)	Address Restricted, Marine Corps Air Ground Combat Center Twentynine Palms	Twentynine Palms	Area of rock art panels more than 2 kilometres (1.2 mi) long.
49	Frankish Building	Frankish Building	August 11, 1980 (#80000839)	200 S. Euclid Ave. 34°03′45″N 117°39′01″W	Ontario	
50	Goffs Schoolhouse	Goffs Schoolhouse	October 11, 2001 (#01001102)	37198 Lanfair Rd. 34°55′12″N 115°03′18″W	Goffs	
51	Government Holes		April 26, 2021 (#100004586)	Cedar Canyon Rd. near Rock Spring in Mojave National Preserve; 35°08′55″N 115°21′34″W	Cima vicinity	
52	Guapiabit–Serrano Homeland Archaeological District		October 26, 2020 (#100001258)	Address Restricted	Hesperia vicinity	
53	Hackberry Corral		April 26, 2021 (#100004583)	Near Lanfair Rd. in Mojave National Preserve; 35°04′56″N 115°11′55″W	Goffs vicinity	
54	Harvey House Railroad Depot	Harvey House Railroad Depot	April 3, 1975 (#75000458)	Santa Fe Depot; 34°54′17″N 117°01′26″W	Barstow	
55	Highland Historic District	Highland Historic District	April 5, 2001 (#01000333)	Roughly bounded by Cole and Nona Ave., Pacific and Church Sts. 34°07′40″N 117°12′29″W	Highland	
56	Hofer Ranch	Hofer Ranch	July 8, 1993 (#93000596)	11248 S. Turner Ave. 34°02′56″N 117°35′05″W	Ontario	
57	Integratron	Integratron	April 23, 2018 (#100002317)	2477 Belfield Blvd. 34°17′40″N 116°24′13″W	Landers	
58	Judson and Brown Ditch	Judson and Brown Ditch	September 29, 2015 (#15000646)	Crosses San Bernardino FCD Rd. 34°06′14″N 117°06′14″W	Redlands	Linear noncontiguous feature that extends from Highland to Redlands
59	Kelso Depot, Restaurant and Employees Hotel	Kelso Depot, Restaurant and Employees Hotel	August 2, 2001 (#01000760)	Kelbaker Rd., junction of Kelbaker and Cima Rds. at Union Pacific Railroad crossing 35°00′44″N 115°39′09″W	Kelso	Boundary increases were approved January 31, 2019 and June 17, 2025.
60	Keys Desert Queen Ranch	Keys Desert Queen Ranch	October 30, 1975 (#75000174)	Southwest of Twentynine Palms in Joshua Tree National Park; 34°02′36″N 116°09′59″W	Twentynine Palms	
61	Kimberly Crest	Kimberly Crest	March 28, 1996 (#96000328)	1325 Prospect Dr. 34°02′16″N 117°10′21″W	Redlands	
62	Lanfair Corral		April 26, 2021 (#100004584)	Near Lanfair Rd. in Mojave National Preserve; 35°07′05″N 115°09′50″W	Goffs vicinity	
63	Sam and Alfreda Maloof Compound	Sam and Alfreda Maloof Compound	November 9, 2010 (#03000471)	5131 Carnelian St. 34°09′40″N 117°36′56″W	Alta Loma	
64	Mary's Cave		August 23, 2021 (#100006817)	Address Restricted	Essex vicinity (Mojave National Preserve)	
65	Marl Springs Corral		April 26, 2021 (#100004576)	Near Old Government Rd. in Mojave National Preserve; 35°10′08″N 115°38′54″W	Kelso vicinity	
66	Mescal Mining District		June 5, 2023 (#100004815)	9.1 miles (14.6 km) southeast of the intersection of Cima Rd. and I 15; 35°25′45″N 115°33′05″W	Cima vicinity	
67	Mill Creek Zanja	Mill Creek Zanja	May 12, 1977 (#77000329)	Sylvan Blvd. E to Mill Creek Rd. 34°03′44″N 117°07′23″W	Redlands	
68	Mojave Road	Mojave Road	September 27, 2021 (#100007003)	Mojave Rd., Mojave National Preserve; 34°00′53″N 117°41′23″W	Baker vicinity	
69	Moyse Building	Moyse Building	February 28, 1979 (#79000522)	13150 7th St. 34°00′53″N 117°41′23″W	Chino	
70	Murphy Well Corral		April 26, 2021 (#100004594)	Nipton Rd. in Mojave National Preserve; 35°27′12″N 115°20′46″W	Nipton vicinity	
71	Natural Corral		April 29, 2021 (#100004591)	Near I-15 in Mojave National Preserve; 35°27′12″N 115°20′46″W	Baker vicinity	
72	New City of Mentalphysics Historic District	New City of Mentalphysics Historic District	January 17, 2023 (#100008539)	59700 Twentyninepalms Hwy. 34°08′07″N 116°21′35″W	Joshua Tree	
73	Newberry Cave Site		November 21, 2000 (#00001325)	Address Restricted	Newberry Springs	
74	OX Ranch Headquarters		April 26, 2021 (#100004580)	Lanfair Rd. in Mojave National Preserve; 35°12′11″N 115°12′04″W	Goffs vicinity	
75	Old San Antonio Hospital	Old San Antonio Hospital	January 2, 1980 (#80000840)	792 W. Arrow Hwy. 34°05′58″N 117°39′34″W	Upland	
76	Old Trails Bridge	Old Trails Bridge	September 30, 1988 (#88001676)	Abandoned U.S. Route 66 over the Colorado River; 34°42′57″N 114°29′05″W	Needles	
77	Ontario and San Antonio Heights Waiting Station	Ontario and San Antonio Heights Waiting Station	September 25, 2012 (#12000813)	1251 W. 24th St. 34°09′05″N 117°40′20″W	Upland	A passenger station for the Ontario and San Antonio Heights Railroad streetcar line
78	Ontario Baseball Park		September 20, 2021 (#100006913)	SE of North Grove Ave. and East 4th St. intersection (NE corner John Galvin Park); 34°04′36″N 117°37′41″W	Ontario	
79	Ontario State Bank Block	Ontario State Bank Block	January 8, 1982 (#82002242)	300 S. Euclid Ave. 34°03′42″N 117°39′02″W	Ontario	Demolished to make way for lowering Euclid Avenue below the railroad tracks.
80	Pacific Electric Etiwanda Depot	Pacific Electric Etiwanda Depot	March 21, 2011 (#11000119)	7092 Etiwanda Ave. 34°07′30″N 117°31′23″W	Rancho Cucamonga	
81	Payne Corral		April 26, 2021 (#100004585)	Off Cedar Canyon Rd. near Rock Spring in Mojave National Preserve; 35°10′01″N 115°19′07″W	Cima vicinity	
82	Pioneer Deep Space Station	Pioneer Deep Space Station	October 3, 1985 (#85002813)	Goldstone Deep Space Communications Complex; 35°23′21″N 116°51′22″W	Fort Irwin	Also known as DSS 11, the first radio telescope at the Goldstone Deep Space Communications Complex.
83	Pioneertown Mane Street Historic District	Pioneertown Mane Street Historic District	May 26, 2020 (#100005220)	Mane St. 34°09′25″N 116°29′49″W	Pioneertown	
84	Pipeline Corral		April 26, 2021 (#100004581)	Near Lanfair Rd. in Mojave National Preserve; 34°55′45″N 115°04′13″W	Goffs vicinity	
85	Piute Dry Corral		April 26, 2021 (#100004582)	10 miles (16 km) E. of Lanfair Rd. in Mojave National Preserve; 35°06′15″N 115°00′45″W	Goffs vicinity	
86	Piute Pass Archeological District		August 14, 1973 (#73000429)	Address Restricted	Needles vicinity	
87	Thomas Place Corral		April 26, 2021 (#100004574)	Near Cedar Canyon Rd. in Mojave National Preserve; 35°10′31″N 115°27′50″W	Cima vicinity	
88	Providence Townsite		August 16, 2016 (#16000522)	10 miles (16 km) off Essex Rd. 34°58′54″N 115°30′26″W	Essex	
89	John Rains House	John Rains House	April 24, 1973 (#73000428)	7869 Vineyard Ave. 34°06′40″N 117°36′36″W	Rancho Cucamonga	Entrance to the museum is now off Hemlock Street the address is 8810 Hemlock St.
90	Redlands Central Railway Company Car Barn	Redlands Central Railway Company Car Barn	January 3, 1991 (#90002119)	746 E. Citrus Ave. 34°03′24″N 117°10′29″W	Redlands	
91	Redlands Santa Fe Depot District	Redlands Santa Fe Depot District	October 29, 1991 (#91001535)	Roughly bounded by Stuart Ave., N. 5th St., Redlands Blvd., Eureka St. and the SFRR tracks 34°03′31″N 117°10′57″W	Redlands	
92	Rock Tank Corral		April 29, 2021 (#100004593)	Near I-15 in Mojave National Preserve; 35°23′16″N 115°42′09″W	Baker vicinity	
93	Rodman Mountains Petroglyphs Archeological District		May 10, 1982 (#82002240)	Address Restricted	Barstow	
94	Russian Village District	Russian Village District	December 28, 1978 (#78000680)	290-370 S. Mills Ave. and 480 Cucamonga Ave. 34°05′29″N 117°42′24″W	Montclair	
95	San Antonio Heights Grove House		December 27, 2024 (#100010920)	425 E 24th St; 34°09′03″N 117°38′46″W	San Antonio Heights	
96	San Bernardino County Court House	San Bernardino County Court House	January 12, 1998 (#97001632)	351 N. Arrowhead Ave. 34°06′20″N 117°17′26″W	San Bernardino	
97	Shady Point	Shady Point	October 5, 2009 (#09000804)	778 Shelter Cove Dr. 34°15′46″N 117°11′00″W	Lake Arrowhead	
98	Smiley Park Historic District	Smiley Park Historic District	December 29, 1994 (#94001487)	Roughly bounded by Brookside Ave., Cajon St., Cypress Ave. and Buena Vista St. 34°03′03″N 117°10′56″W	Redlands	
99	Soda Springs Historic District	Soda Springs Historic District	November 8, 2022 (#100004814)	4.8 miles (7.7 km) south of I 15, on Zzyzx Rd. 35°08′36″N 116°06′22″W	Baker vicinity	
100	Squaw Spring Archeological District		July 28, 1981 (#81000169)	Address Restricted	Red Mountain	
101	Topock Maze Archeological Site		October 5, 1978 (#78000745)	Address Restricted	Needles vicinity	
102	Upland Public Library	Upland Public Library	December 10, 1990 (#90001817)	123 E. D St. 34°05′55″N 117°38′55″W	Upland	
103	US Post Office-Downtown Station	US Post Office-Downtown Station	January 11, 1985 (#85000136)	390 W. 5th St. 34°06′31″N 117°17′26″W	San Bernardino	
104	US Post Office-Redlands Main	US Post Office-Redlands Main	January 11, 1985 (#85000135)	201 Brookside Ave. 34°03′18″N 117°11′05″W	Redlands	
105	Valley View Ranch Corral		December 1, 2025 (#100004589)	Near Cima Rd. 35°19′12″N 115°35′03″W	Cima	
106	Valley View Ranch Headquarters		December 1, 2025 (#100004588)	Near Cima Rd. 35°19′08″N 115°35′04″W	Cima	
107	Vulcan Mine Historic District		July 15, 2019 (#100004180)	5.28 miles (8.50 km) E. of Kelbaker Rd., on Vulcan Mine Rd. 34°55′18″N 115°34′15″W	Kelso vicinity	
108	Wall Street Mill	Wall Street Mill	November 12, 1975 (#75000176)	South of Twentynine Palms in Joshua Tree National Park; 34°02′10″N 116°07′59″W	Twentynine Palms	
109	Henry Washington Survey Marker	Henry Washington Survey Marker	May 12, 1975 (#75000459)	South of Big Bear City in San Bernardino National Forest; 34°07′13″N 116°55′46″W	Big Bear City	
110	Watson Buttes		April 22, 2024 (#100010224)	Address Restricted	Essex vicinity	
111	Watson Well Corral		April 26, 2021 (#100004587)	South of Cedar Canyon Rd. in Mojave National Preserve; 35°06′47″N 115°18′13″W	Cima vicinity	
112	White Rock Spring Corral		December 1, 2025 (#100004569)	Near Cima Rd. 35°15′55″N 115°32′55″W	Cima	
113	Wigwam Village No. 7	Wigwam Village No. 7	January 3, 2012 (#11000957)	2728 Foothill Rd. 34°06′26″N 117°21′00″W	San Bernardino	
114	Woods Wash		April 30, 2025 (#100011752)	Address Restricted	Goffs vicinity	
115	Yorba-Slaughter Adobe	Yorba-Slaughter Adobe	July 7, 1975 (#75000460)	5.5 miles (8.9 km) south of Chino at 17127 Pomona Rincon Rd. 33°56′26″N 117°39′52″W	Chino	

== See also ==
- List of National Historic Landmarks in California
- National Register of Historic Places listings in California
- California Historical Landmarks in San Bernardino County, California
