= National Register of Historic Places listings in Joshua Tree National Park =

This is a list of the National Register of Historic Places listings in Joshua Tree National Park.

This is intended to be a complete list of the properties and districts on the National Register of Historic Places in Joshua Tree National Park, California, United States. The locations of National Register properties and districts for which the latitude and longitude coordinates are included below, may be seen in an online map.

There are six properties and districts listed on the National Register in the park.

This National Park Service list is complete through NPS recent listings posted June 20, 2025.

== Current listings ==
	Name on the Register	Image	Date listed	Location	City or town	Description
1	Barker Dam	Barker Dam	October 29, 1975 (#75000173)	SE of Twentynine Palms in Joshua Tree National Park; 34°01′51″N 116°08′47″W	Twentynine Palms vicinity	
2	Cow Camp	Cow Camp	October 29, 1975 (#75000228)	SW of Twentynine Palms in Joshua Tree National Park; 34°02′12″N 116°09′48″W	Twentynine Palms vicinity	
3	Desert Queen Mine	Desert Queen Mine	January 17, 1976 (#76000216)	S of Twentynine Palms in Joshua Tree National Park; 34°01′27″N 116°04′17″W	Twentynine Palms vicinity	
4	Keys Desert Queen Ranch	Keys Desert Queen Ranch	October 30, 1975 (#75000174)	SW of Twentynine Palms in Joshua Tree National Park; 34°02′44″N 116°10′09″W	Twentynine Palms vicinity	
5	Ryan House and Lost Horse Well	Ryan House and Lost Horse Well	June 5, 1975 (#75000175)	S of Twentynine Palms in Joshua Tree National Park; 33°59′04″N 116°08′57″W	Twentynine Palms vicinity	
6	Wall Street Mill	Wall Street Mill	November 12, 1975 (#75000176)	S of Twentynine Palms in Joshua Tree National Park; 34°02′11″N 116°08′02″W	Twentynine Palms vicinity	

== See also ==
- National Register of Historic Places listings in Riverside County, California
- National Register of Historic Places listings in San Bernardino County, California
- National Register of Historic Places listings in San Diego County, California
- List of National Historic Landmarks in California
- National Register of Historic Places listings in California
