= Ploot =

Ploot may refer to:

- "Ploot", an episode of Lilo & Stitch: The Series
  - Ploot, a character in the above episode
- PLOOT, a codename for a reflex camera housing from Leica Camera
- Ploot, a character used in advertising for Butlin's, a chain of UK seaside resorts

== See also ==
- Plute (disambiguation)
- Pluot
- Plot (disambiguation)
- Pulte (disambiguation)
