= San Bernardino Station =

San Bernardino station may refer to:

- San Bernardino Santa Fe Depot, the rail station opened in 1918
- San Bernardino Transit Center, the rail and bus station opened in 2014
- San Bernardino Downtown Station, the post office on the list of National Register of Historic Places
