= Plute =

Plute may refer to:

- Plutonium
- Plute, an informal term for a plutocrat in the context of Industrial Workers of the World philosophy and tactics
- Plute or pluteus, a moveable shield used alongside siege engines in ancient Roman warfare

== People with the name ==
- Vilis Olavs or Vilis Plute (1867–1917), Latvian political theorist, writer, and humanitarian
- Ronald Plute, American soccer player and former player with DFW Tornado
- Sandy Plute, a songwriter contributor to the soundtrack of Wild Wild West
- Plute Pete, performer at the Village Barn

=== Fictional ===
- Max Plute, a character in The Nth Commandment

== See also ==
- Piute (disambiguation)
- Ploot (disambiguation)
- Pulte (disambiguation)
