= Numu =

Numu may refer to:

- Blacksmiths of western Africa
- Northern Paiute language
- Paiute (disambiguation)
- New Museum Los Gatos
