= Hofer Ranch =

Historic house in California, United States

- The Hofer Ranch
- U.S. National Register of Historic Places
- U.S. Historic district
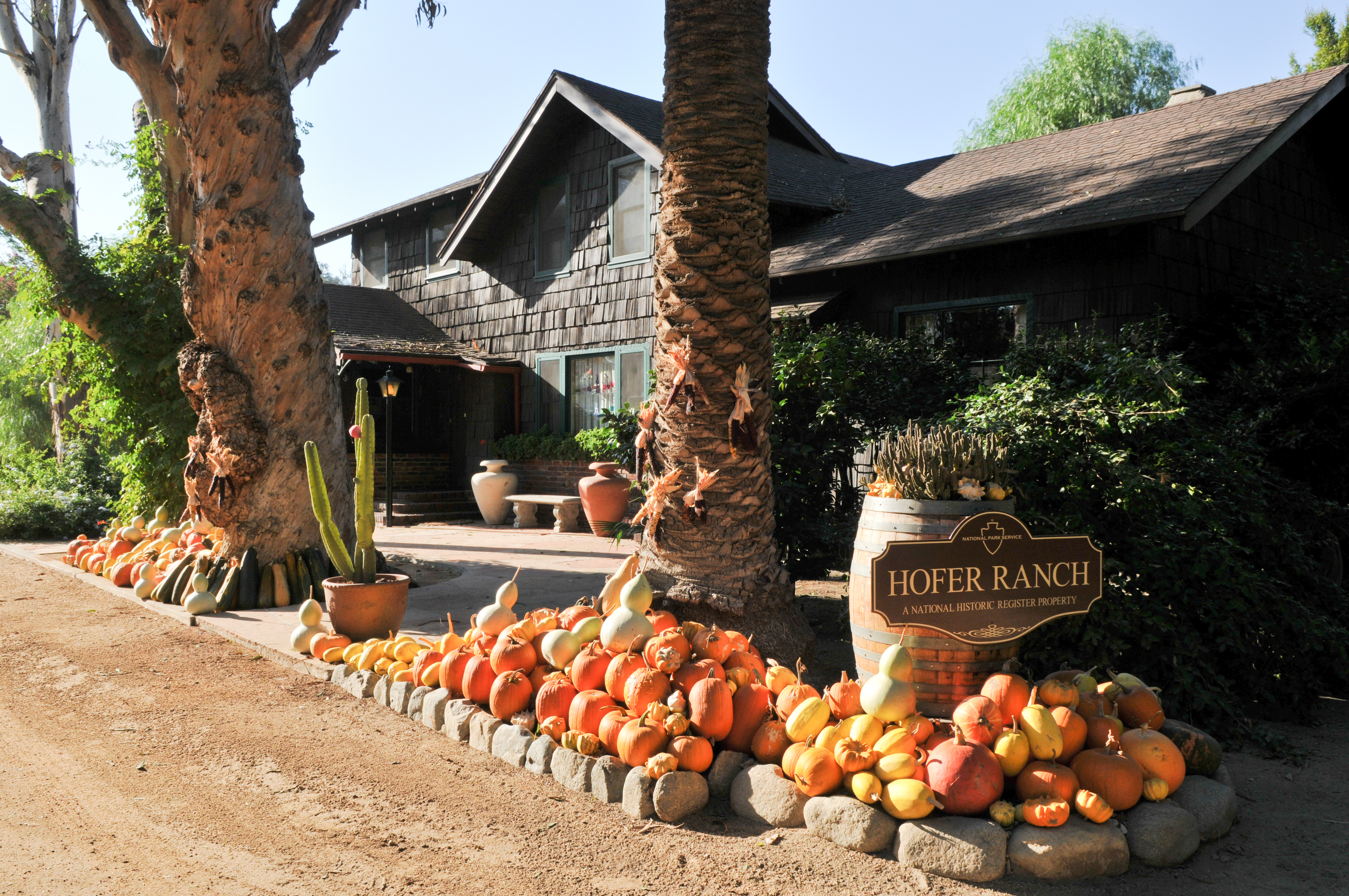

- Location within California Location within the United States
- Location: Ontario, California
- NRHP reference No.: 93000596
- Added to NRHP: July 8, 1993

The Hofer Ranch is a historic ranch and ranch headquarters compound located in Ontario, located in the Pomona Valley and San Bernardino County, in Southern California. It is within the Cucamonga Valley AVA Wine Appellation.

== History ==
The family purchased the first lands in 1882. The family lived and worked the ranch, expanding it to 960 acres (390 ha). Originally, a number of crops were grown, but grapes, apricots, and peaches were the dominant crop.

The original home was an abandoned two room schoolhouse that was on the property. Over the years, the family built a barn, then a bunkhouse as more land required more men to drive the teams of horses to work the land.

A vacant Santa Fe, one room land office was then purchased and moved to the headquarters by a team of horses. Several of the family lived in it until the two room home was expanded, as the family grew.

Woodsheds were then added onto the property to store wood. As was a cookhouse to feed the men who lived and worked at the Ranch. Over time, sheds for tractors, autos and trucks edged out the teams of horses.

Winegrapes eventually became the dominant crop in the late 1890's and beyond.

The ranch was added as a Historic district to the National Register of Historic Places on July 8, 1993. As of 2024, The Hofer Ranch is still in operation, producing winegrapes. The family has lived and worked at the Ranch continuously since 1882. It is said to be the best-preserved ranch in Ontario, it is one of the area's few surviving remnants of a notable agricultural history.

== See also ==
- National Register of Historic Places listings in San Bernardino County, California
- Ranches on the National Register of Historic Places in California
