= Blackwater Well =

- U.S. National Register of Historic Places
- U.S. Historic district
- Location within California Location within the United States
- Nearest city: Red Mountain, California
- Coordinates: 35°21′29″N 117°20′54″W
- Area: 710 acres (290 ha)
- NRHP reference No.: 00001326
- Added to NRHP: November 21, 2000

Blackwater Well was a historic well in northwestern San Bernardino County, California. The well was built in the 19th century by the U.S. Army as a water stop on the Granite Wells Road, which linked Death Valley with Johannesburg. The route was also part of the Twenty Mule Team Borax Route, and it served as one of three water stops along the 165-mile (266 km) route. The Granite Wells Road was also a popular travel route into Death Valley, and the well served as a campsite along the road.

The well was added to the National Register of Historic Places on November 21, 2000. The Desert Tortoise Preservation Committee, which owned the well and the surrounding land, subsequently dismantled the well; the Bureau of Land Management, the previous owner, condemned the dismantling as a violation of the terms of sale.
