= Auerbacher Home =

Historic house in California, United States

- U.S. National Register of Historic Places
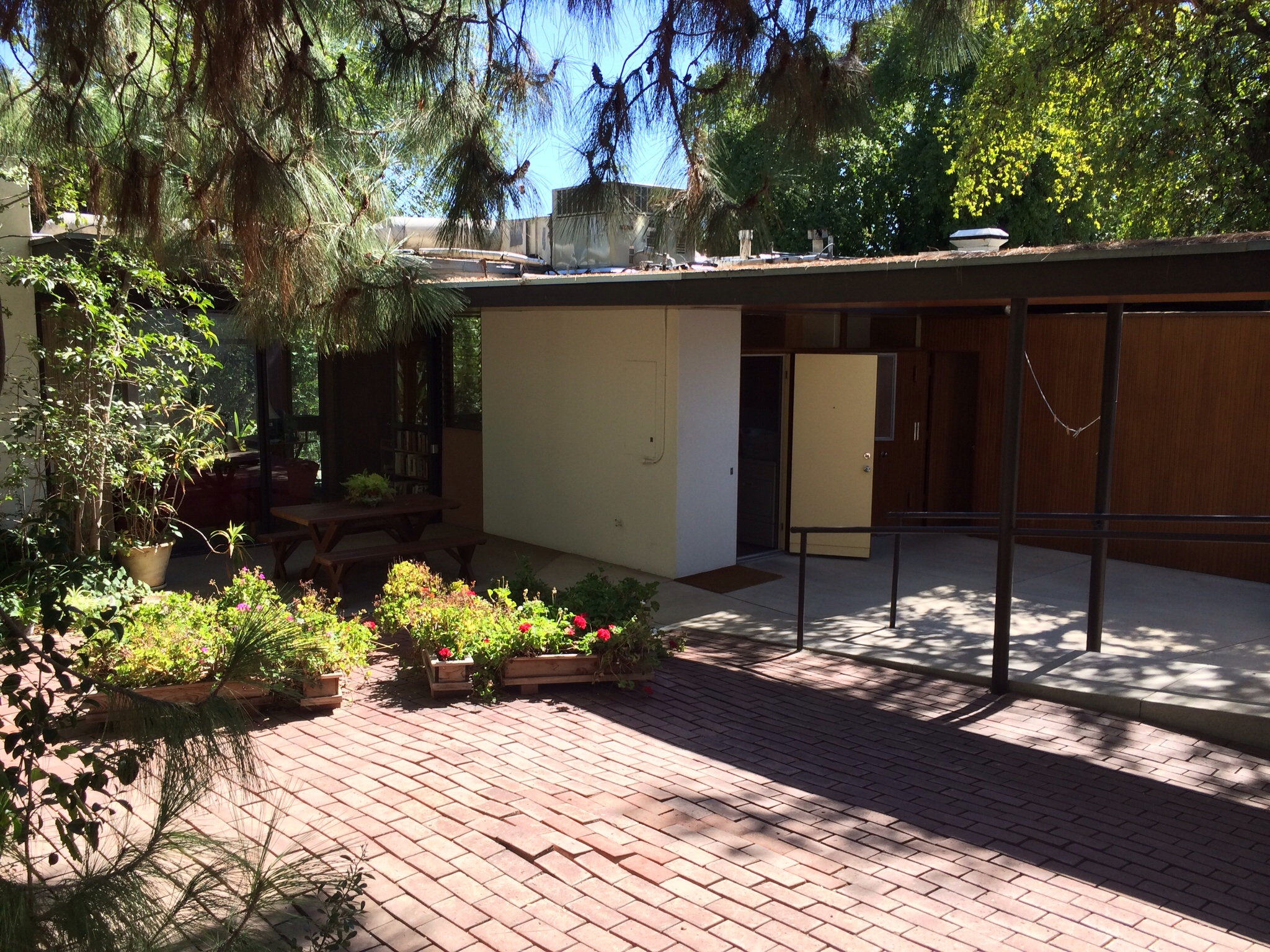

- Location within California Location within the United States
- Location: 121 Sierra Vista Dr., Redlands, California
- Coordinates: 34°01′18″N 117°09′02″W
- Architect: Richard Neutra
- Architectural style: Mid-century Modern
- NRHP reference No.: 12000442
- Added to NRHP: August 1, 2012

The Auerbacher Home, in Redlands, San Bernardino County, California, is a historic Modernist house commissioned by Frederick and Mary Jane Auerbacher. It was designed by architect Richard Neutra in 1951.

In 2011, when the house was nominated for listing on the National Register of Historic Places, the house was still furnished with living room chairs and a coffee table designed by Neutra, and Mary Jane Auerbacher still resided there. It was listed on the National Register of Historic Places in 2012.

== See also ==
- National Register of Historic Places listings in San Bernardino County, California
