= Frankish Building =

- U.S. National Register of Historic Places
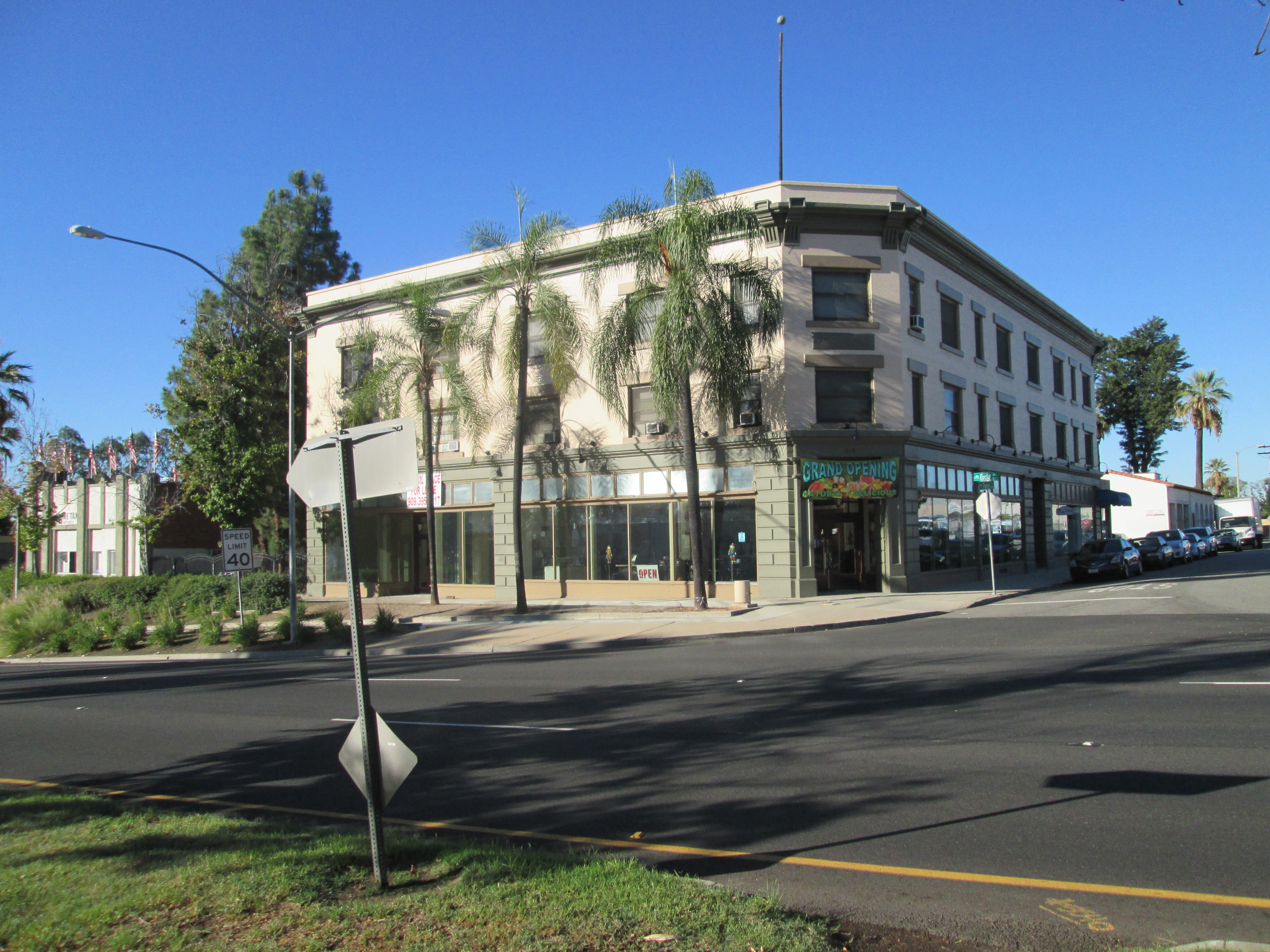
- The Frankish Building in October 2015

- Location within California Location within the United States
- Location: 200 S. Euclid Ave., Ontario, California
- Coordinates: 34°3′45″N 117°39′1″W
- Area: less than one acre
- Built: 1915-16
- Architect: Frankish, Charles
- Architectural style: Second Renaissance Revival
- NRHP reference No.: 80000839
- Added to NRHP: August 11, 1980

The Frankish Building is a historic building located at 200 South Euclid Avenue in Ontario, California. Charles Frankish and his son designed and supervised the construction of the building in 1915–16. Frankish was an early investor in Ontario and was responsible for much of the city's planning and promotion, which included constructing a railroad in and planning the layout of the southern half of the city. The building housed storefronts on its first floor and an apartment complex on its second and third floors. Frankish gave the building a Second Renaissance Revival design, a popular American style in the early twentieth century. The building's design includes a flat facade and roof, rusticated quoins on the first floor, and a bracketed wooden cornice.

The building was added to the National Register of Historic Places on August 11, 1980.

== See also ==
- Ontario State Bank Block
