= Desert Queen Mine =

- U.S. National Register of Historic Places
- U.S. Historic district
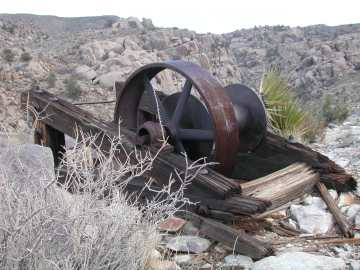

- Location within California Location within the United States
- Nearest city: Twentynine Palms, California
- Coordinates: 34°1′26″N 116°4′9″W
- Built: 1894
- Architect: Multiple
- NRHP reference No.: 76000216
- Added to NRHP: January 17, 1976

The Desert Queen Mine in the California Desert was one of the more long-lived gold mines of Southern California's high desert region. The abandoned mine is located in Riverside County, California within the boundaries of the Joshua Tree National Park and is included on the National Register of Historic Places. A hiking trail leads to the mine.

The mine is associated with Jim McHaney, a local cattle rustler, and Bill Keys, a noted rancher. The mine facilities are largely ruinous. The mine was not spectacularly successful but was sufficiently productive to remain in operation for nearly seventy-five years.

The mine itself consisted of several vertical and horizontal shafts, of which four vertical shafts, five inclined shafts, and ten horizontal adits remain. Tailings piles appear in several places, with quantities of machinery scattered about the site.

The mine was established by a man named Frank L. James in the early 1890s. The rich ore initially found prompted local outlaw gang leader and cattle rustler Jim McHaney to take over the mine. McHaney sent two of his men, Charley Martin and a man named Myers, to demand the mine from James. James refused, and Martin shot and killed him with a gun borrowed from Myers, after forcing James to sign over the property. Martin was acquitted of murder charges on grounds of self-defense. When the mine was first claimed by Jim McHaney, it was reported to be the Lost "Peg-Leg" mine of prospector Thomas Long "Pegleg" Smith.

McHaney initially prospered but borrowed heavily to expand and fell behind on payments to the bank, ultimately losing the mine. The mine passed into the hands of William F. Keys around 1917, who operated the mine until 1961.

== See also ==
- Cow Camp, home of the McHaney Gang
- Keys Desert Queen Ranch
- Wall Street Mill
