= Old San Antonio Hospital =

- U.S. National Register of Historic Places
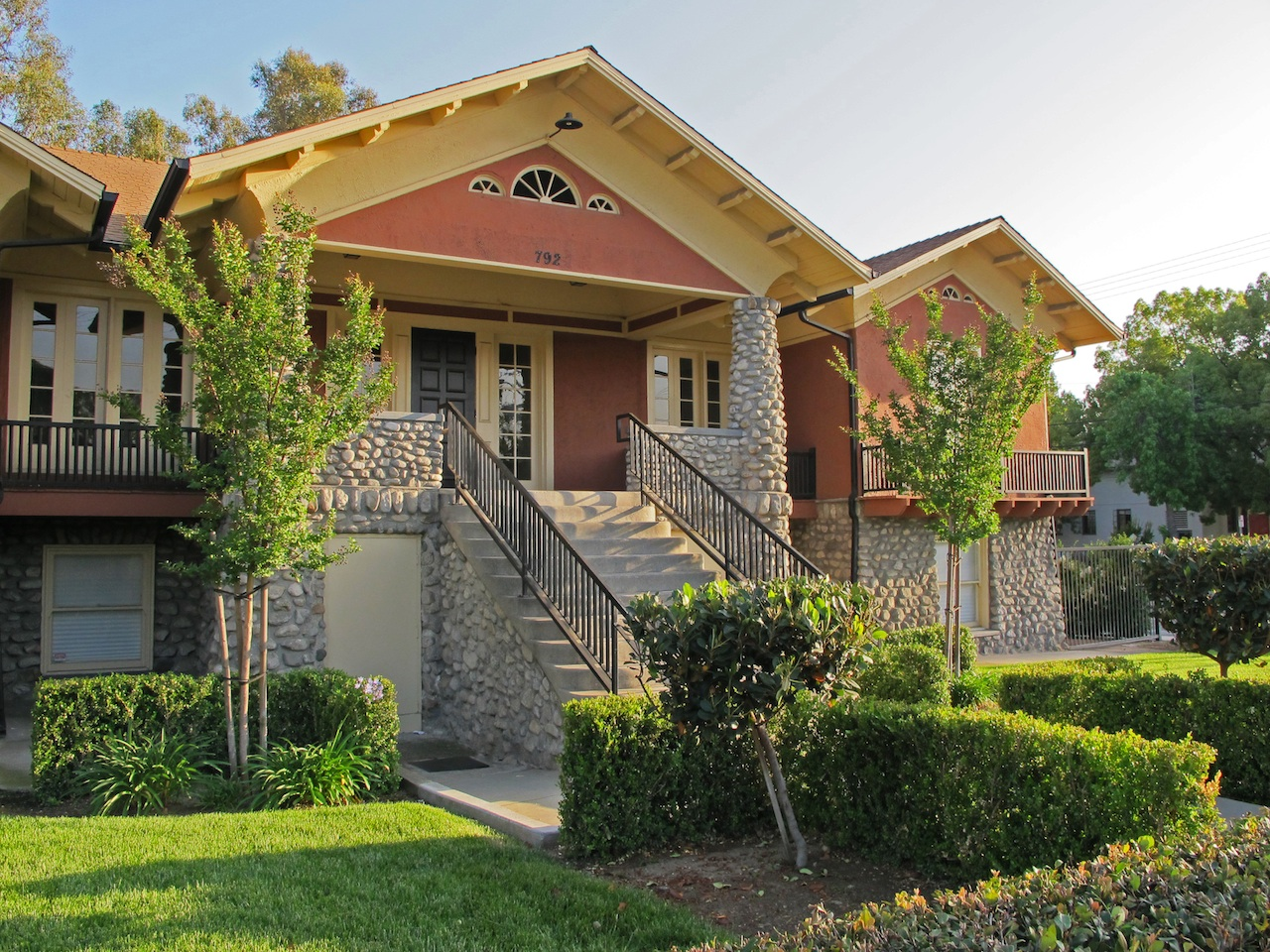

- Location within California Location within the United States
- Location: 792 W. Arrow Hwy., Upland, California
- Coordinates: 34°5′58″N 117°39′34″W
- Area: less than one acre
- Built: 1907
- Built by: Hammil Construction
- Architect: Hunt, Myron
- NRHP reference No.: 80000840
- Added to NRHP: January 2, 1980

The Old San Antonio Hospital is a historic building located at 792 West Arrow Highway in Upland, California. Built in 1907, the building served as Upland's first hospital. Prominent Southern California architect Myron Hunt designed the building, which makes extensive use of riverbed rock, a common local building material. The building's design features an entrance portico with stone columns, French doors along the length of the south wall, projecting eaves with carved beams, and three gable roofs extending from a central hip roof. The building served as Upland's only hospital until 1924, when a newer hospital replaced it; it functioned as a resort for the next eleven years and has since been used by various religious organizations.

The building was added to the National Register of Historic Places on January 2, 1980.
