= Bono's Restaurant and Deli =

- U.S. National Register of Historic Places
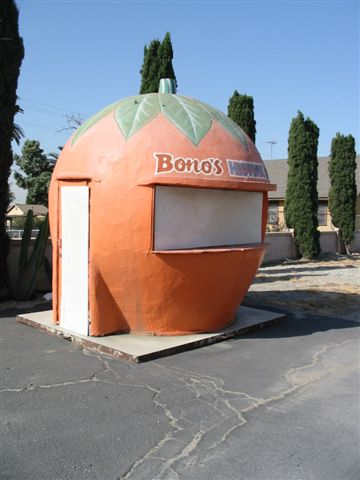
- The Big Orange

- Location within California Location within the United States
- Nearest city: Fontana, California
- Coordinates: 34°6′23″N 117°28′9″W
- Area: 1 acre (0.40 ha)
- Built: 1943
- Architectural style: Moderne
- NRHP reference No.: 07001353
- Added to NRHP: January 10, 2008

Bono's Restaurant and Deli was a historic restaurant located at 15395 Foothill Boulevard in Fontana, California. The restaurant opened in 1936 to serve travelers on U.S. Route 66, which then passed in front of the site; it originally operated as a produce stand.

In 1943, increased traffic on the highway prompted the owners to expand their operations, and the current building was constructed as a full-service restaurant. The restaurant building has a Streamline Moderne design and features red and green stripes promoting its Italian cuisine as well as painted grapevines promoting its wine. As Fontana's Italian immigrant community grew in the 1940s, the restaurant also became a local source of Italian foods previously unavailable in the area.

The restaurant, which reopened on February 8, 2019, after being closed for many years, was added to the National Register of Historic Places in 2008. Joe Bono received permission to move the building 20 feet (6.1 m) back from Foothill Boulevard in 2013. While the historic building remains Bono's Restaurant and Deli is permanently closed and has been replaced with the "Peruvian Restaurant Route 66"

The Big Orange, a 7-foot (2.1 m) tall orange-shaped citrus stand, is located on the property of the restaurant. The orange was originally located 3 miles (4.8 km) to the east. The orange juice stand was one of many similar businesses that served people along U.S. Route 66, adjacent to the abundance of orange groves, in the 1920s and 1930s. Restaurant owner Joe Bono [cousin of Sonny Bono] purchased the stand in the 1990s and moved it to its current site. While the restaurant had an orange-shaped stand of its own when it served Route 66 traffic, it was eventually demolished due to decreased demand. The Big Orange is one of six surviving orange-shaped buildings in California. As of 2022, the Big Orange has been removed from the property.
