= Henry Washington Survey Marker =

- U.S. National Register of Historic Places
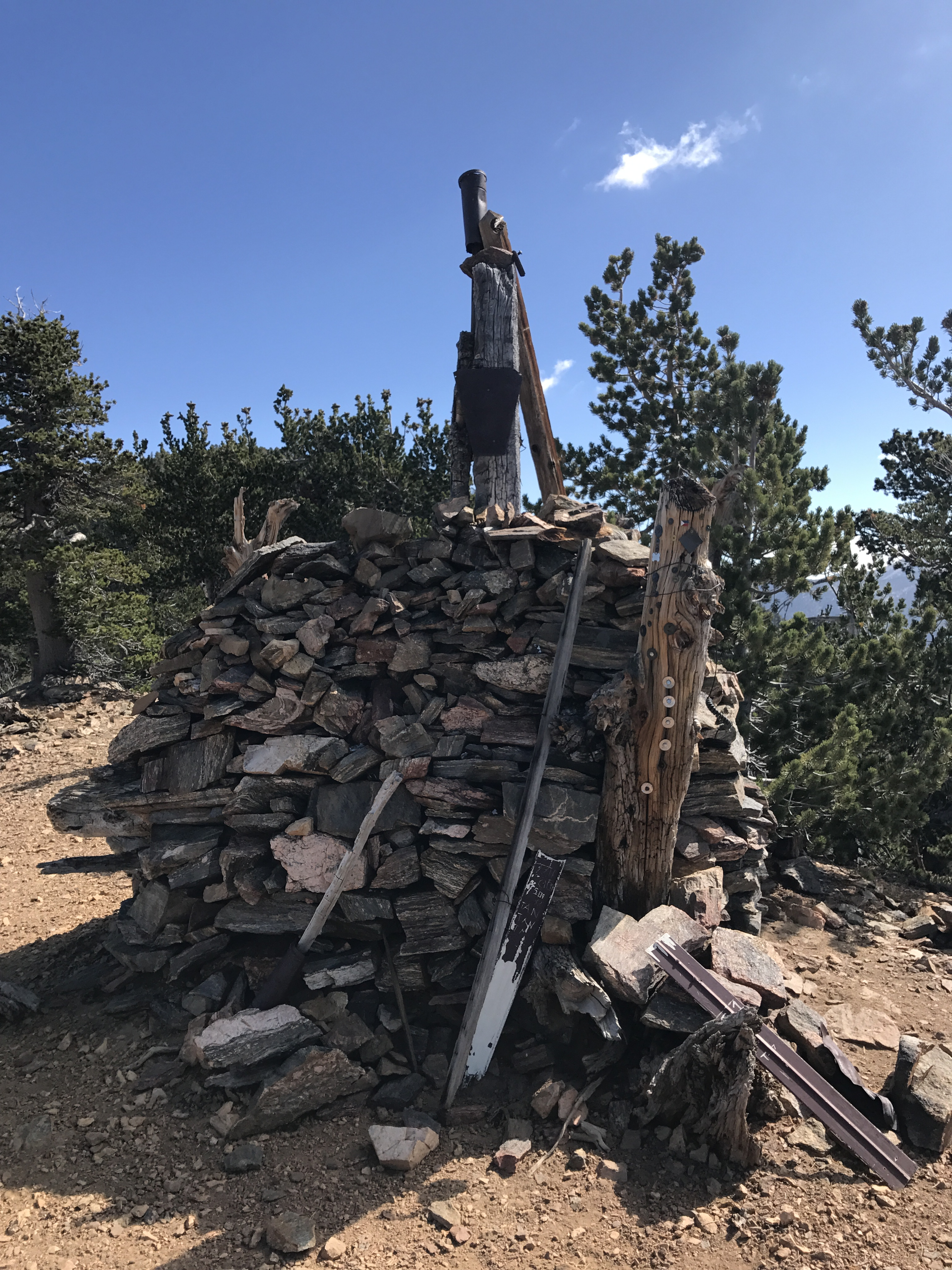

- Location within California Location within the United States
- Nearest city: Big Bear City, California
- Coordinates: 34°7′13″N 116°55′46″W
- Area: 2 acres (0.81 ha)
- Built: 1852
- NRHP reference No.: 75000459
- Added to NRHP: May 12, 1975

The Henry Washington Survey Marker is a survey marker in San Bernardino National Forest in San Bernardino County, California. The marker served as the earliest initial points of the San Bernardino Baseline and Meridian, which in turn mark the starting points for the surveying and subdivision of land in Southern California. Colonel Henry Washington placed the marker in 1852 at the beginning of the U.S. Surveyor General's Office's land survey of Southern California, the first survey of the region. Later surveys in 1897 and 1907 set new initial points for the survey east and west of the marker; these points replaced Washington's marker as the official initial points in 1917. Washington's original marker nonetheless still serves as a point along the baseline.

The marker was added to the National Register of Historic Places on May 12, 1975.
