= Fontana Farms Company Ranch House, Camp No. 1 =

Historic house in California, United States

- U.S. National Register of Historic Places
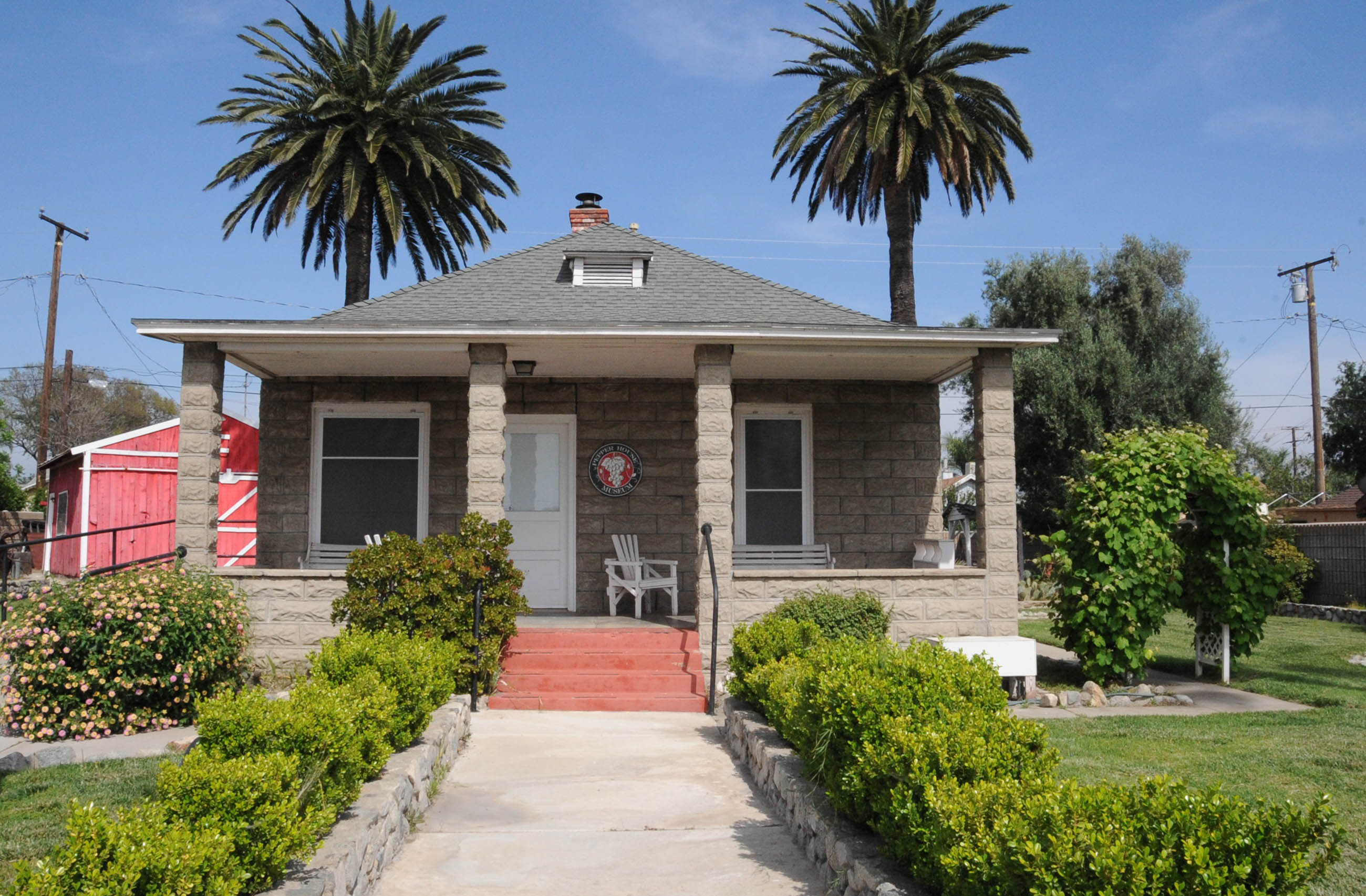

- Location within California Location within the United States
- Location: 8863 Pepper St., Fontana, California
- Coordinates: 34°5′34″N 117°26′28″W
- Area: 0.3 acres (0.12 ha)
- Built: 1905-06
- Built by: Fontana Development Company
- NRHP reference No.: 82000982
- Added to NRHP: November 1, 1982

The Fontana Farms Company Ranch House, Camp No. 1 is a historic ranch house located at 8863 Pepper Street in Fontana, California. Built in 1905–06, it was the first building constructed in Fontana, then a rural community known as Rosena. The Semi-Tropic Land and Water Company platted Rosena in 1887, but no construction occurred in the area until after the Fontana Development Company bought the land in 1903. The company made plans to build a farm on the property, and construction began in 1905; the Camp No. 1 house served as the farm's main headquarters and housed its managers. The farm mainly grew grain crops, though it also had significant fruit and livestock operations. Fontana became an industrial city during World War II, and the ranch house is one of the few remnants of its agricultural past.

The house was added to the National Register of Historic Places on November 1, 1982.
