= CA-SBR-3186 =

Archaeological site in California, United States

- Archeological Site CA SBR 3186
- U.S. National Register of Historic Places
- Nearest city: Silver Lakes, California
- Area: 6.4 acres (2.6 ha)
- NRHP reference No.: 81000170
- Added to NRHP: February 10, 1981

CA-SBR-3186 is an archaeological site located in the central Mojave Desert in San Bernardino County, California. The site, which is situated on an alluvial fan on the north side of the Soda Mountains, includes 174 cairns. The cairns are approximately 12 centimetres (4.7 in) tall and 1 metre (3 ft 3 in) across, making them relatively small compared to similar formations. The cairns are estimated to have been built in the late prehistoric period due to the site's relative lack of aging. Archaeologists have speculated that indigenous peoples built the cairns to control water flows.

The site was added to the National Register of Historic Places on February 10, 1981.
