= Pulte =

Pulte may refer to:

== People ==
- Joseph Hippolyt Pulte (1811–1884), German-American homeopathic physician
- William J. Pulte (1932–2018), founder and former chairman of Pulte Homes
- Bill Pulte (born 1988), director of the Federal Housing Finance Agency

== Other ==
- Lag Prau Pulté, a lake in Switzerland
- PulteGroup, an American home construction company

== See also ==
- Plute (disambiguation)
