= Crowder Canyon Archaeological District =

Archaeological site in California, United States

- Crowder Canyon Archeological District
- U.S. National Register of Historic Places
- U.S. Historic district
- Nearest city: San Bernardino, California
- Area: 1,120 acres (450 ha)
- NRHP reference No.: 76000514
- Added to NRHP: June 16, 1976

Crowder Canyon Archaeological District is an archaeological district located in Cajon Pass in San Bernardino County, California. The district consists of several sites associated with Native American occupation during the Millingstone Horizon. The sites in the district include habitation areas, work camps, and activity sites used for a single function. At the time of its discovery, the district was the furthest site inland associated with the Millingstone Horizon, though other sites further inland have since been discovered. The first excavations at the site took place in the 1940s; later surveys and excavations were conducted by the Southern California Gas Company and Caltrans prior to construction work in the area.

The district was added to the National Register of Historic Places on June 16, 1976.
