= Ontario State Bank Block =

Historic building in California, US

- U.S. National Register of Historic Places
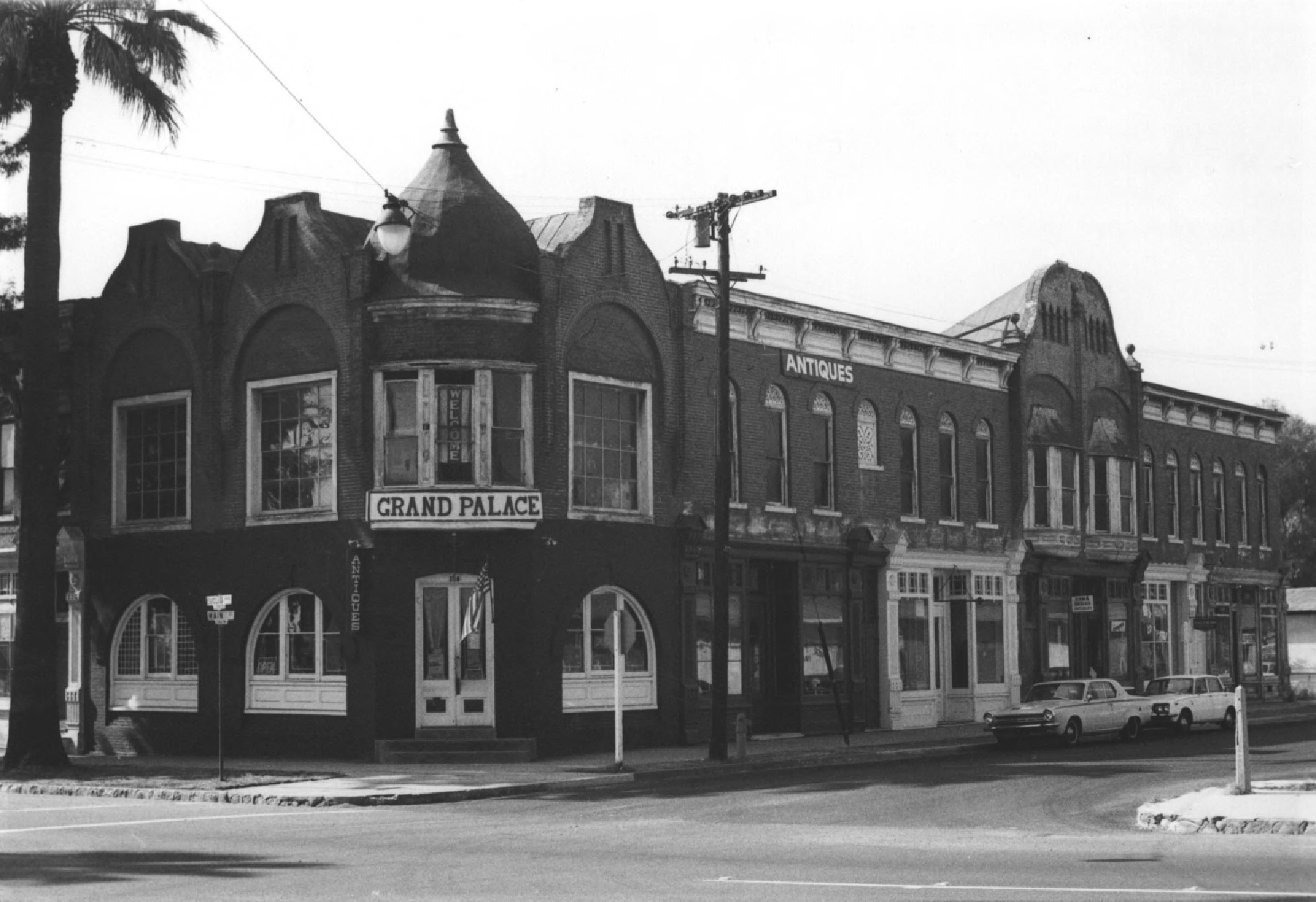
- The Ontario State Bank Block in 1977
- Location: 300 S. Euclid Avenue; Ontario, California
- Coordinates: 34°3′42″N 117°39′2″W
- Area: less than one acre
- Built: 1887
- Architectural style: Eastlake, Queen Anne
- NRHP reference No.: 82002242
- Added to NRHP: January 8, 1982

The Ontario State Bank Block was a historic commercial building located at 300 South Euclid Avenue in Ontario, California. The building, completed in 1887, was composed of three sections, and had a design which incorporated elements of the Eastlake and Queen Anne styles. The design included a corner turret, several gables along the roof line, and a variety of different window styles; it originally had three prominent oriel windows in the gable peaks above the bank's original section, and also had a set in the second section of the block. Decorative features included corbelled brickwork and carved wooden pilasters and brackets. The Ontario State Bank, which opened with the building, was the first bank in Ontario and an important early business center for the city. The building also housed several other shops, including Grand Palace Pavilion of Antiques, Howell's Furniture and Hardware, and E.H. Richardson's Pacific Electric Heating Company, which invented the Hotpoint electric iron and brought national attention to Ontario.

The building was added to the National Register of Historic Places on January 8, 1982. It burned down in 1986.

Euclid Avenue is on the National Register of Historic Places.

== See also ==
- Frankish Building
