= Piute (disambiguation) =

Piute may refer to:

- Piute County, Utah, United States
- Piute ground squirrel, species of rodent
- Piute Mountains, mountain range of Southern California
- Piute Range, mountain range of the Mojave Desert
- Piute Pass, a mountain pass of the Sierra Nevada
- Piute Pass Archeological District, a mountain pass and archaeological district of the Mojave Desert
- Piute Ponds, with Big Piute and Little Piute, small lakes to the southeast of Rosamond, California

== See also ==
- Paiute, a Native American people
