= San Bernardino Downtown Station =

United States historic post office

- US Post Office-Downtown Station
- U.S. National Register of Historic Places
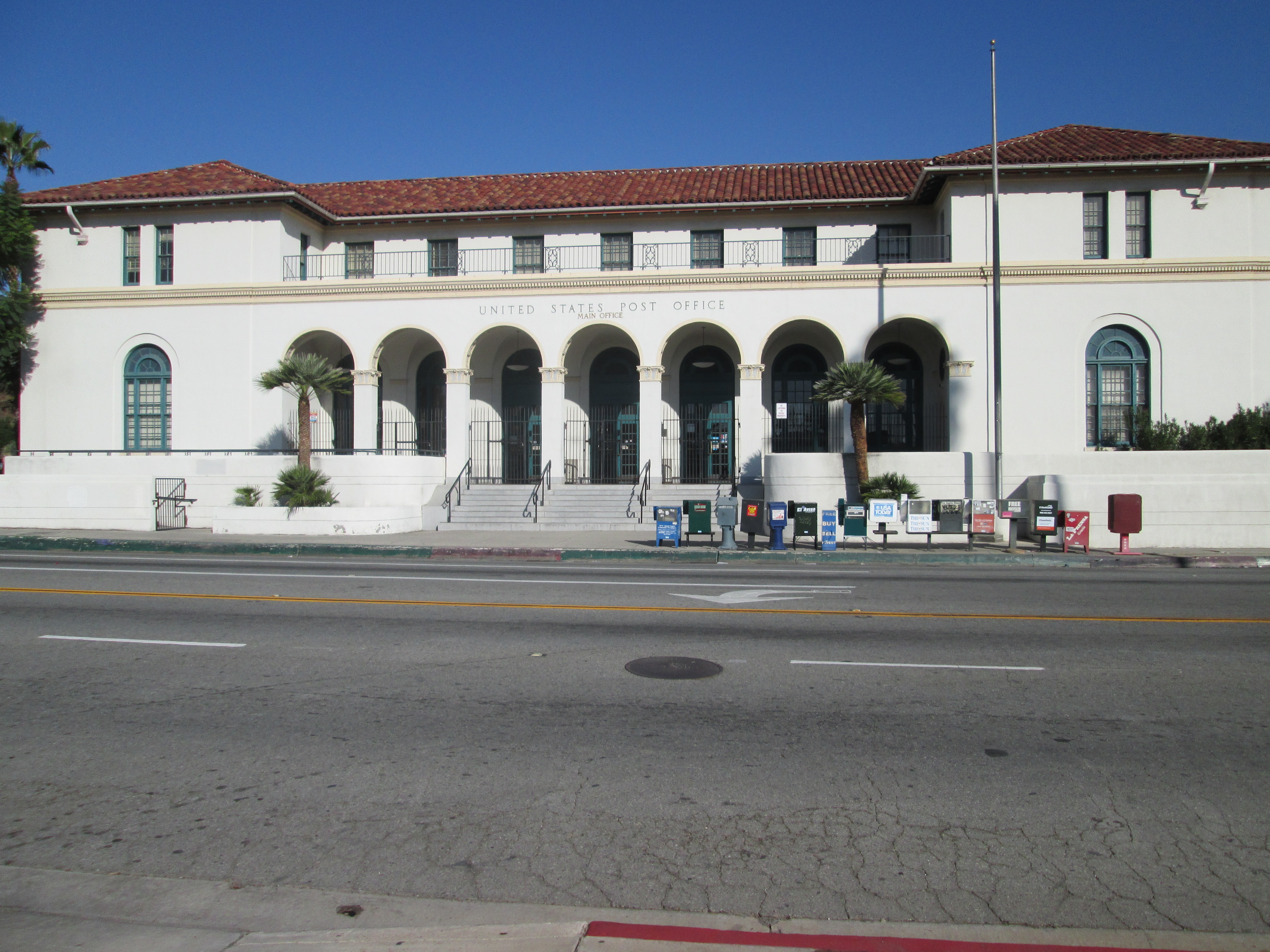

- Location within California Location within the United States
- Location: 390 W. 5th St., San Bernardino, California
- Coordinates: 34°6′31″N 117°17′26″W
- Area: 0.8 acres (0.32 ha)
- Built: 1931
- Built by: Wetmore, James A.
- Architect: Simon, Louis A.
- Architectural style: Beaux Arts, Italianate, Mediterranean Revival
- MPS: US Post Office in California 1900-1941 TR
- NRHP reference No.: 85000136
- Added to NRHP: January 11, 1985

The San Bernardino Downtown Station, located at 390 West 5th Street, is the main post office serving San Bernardino, California. The post office was built in 1931 as part of the decade's federal construction programs; it is one of the few remaining buildings in San Bernardino which predates 1950. Architect Louis A. Simon designed the building, which incorporates a number of architectural styles. The general plan of the building is Beaux-Arts; however, the decorative details are inspired by the Mediterranean Revival and Italianate styles. The front of the building features an arcade with acanthus leaf capitals on the supporting columns and a second-floor porch. A red terra cotta tile roof tops the building.

The post office was added to the National Register of Historic Places on January 11, 1985.

== See also ==
- National Register of Historic Places listings in San Bernardino County, California
- List of United States post offices
