= Keys Desert Queen Ranch =

- U.S. National Register of Historic Places
- U.S. Historic district
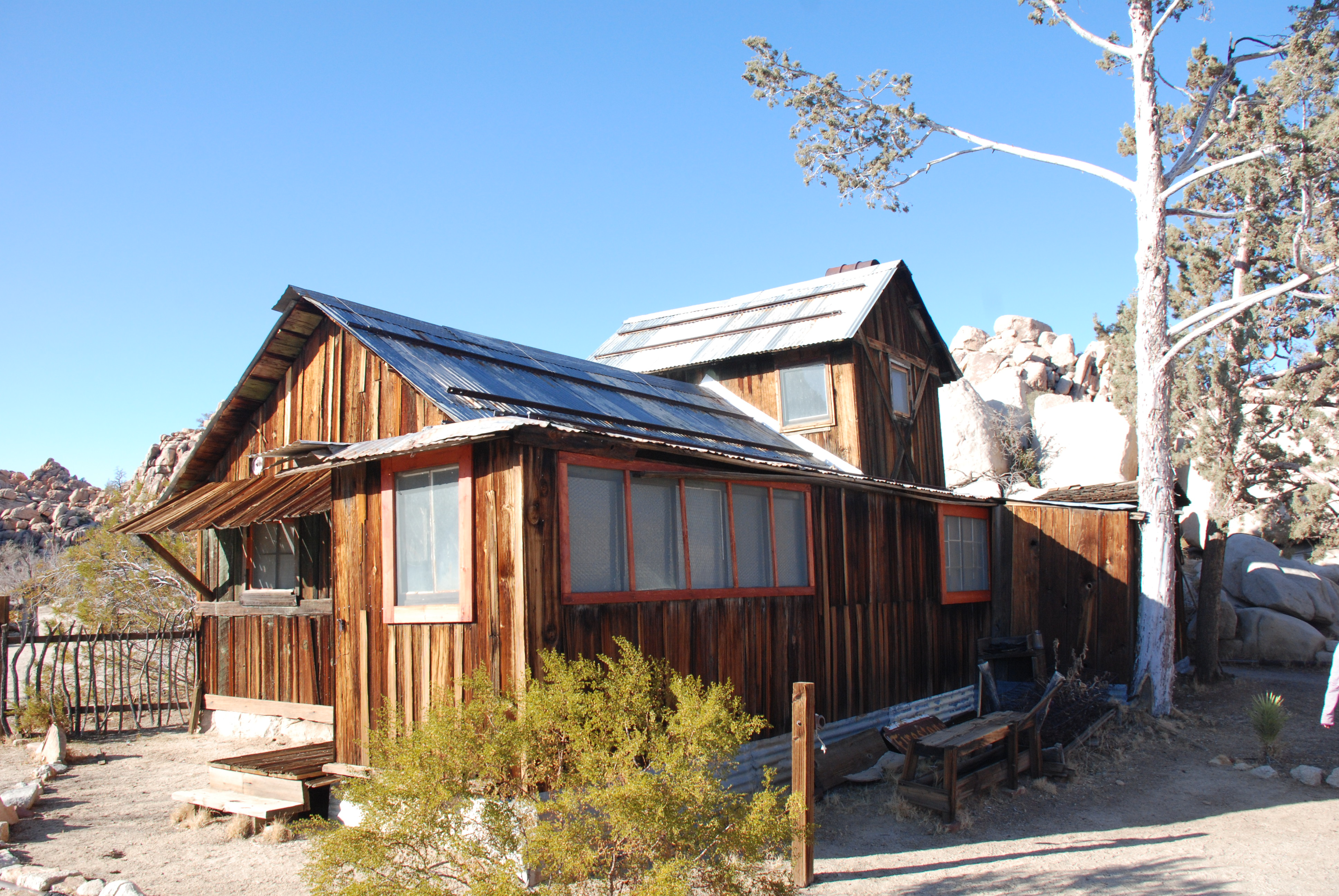

- Location within California Location within the United States
- Location: Joshua Tree National Park, San Bernardino County, California, USA
- Nearest city: Twentynine Palms, California
- Coordinates: 34°2′45.43″N 116°10′8.41″W
- Built: 1894
- Architect: Bill McHaney, William F. Keys
- NRHP reference No.: 75000174
- Added to NRHP: October 30, 1975

The Keys Ranch is the prime example of early settlement in the Joshua Tree National Park area. Bill Keys was the area's leading character, and his ranch is a symbol of the resourcefulness of early settlers. The ranch is an extensive complex of small frame buildings built between 1910 and Keys' death in 1969. Keys pursued both ranching and mining to make a living in the desert.

William Franklin Keys was born at Palisade, Nebraska, in 1879. After working as a ranch hand and smelter worker, he was a deputy sheriff in Mohave County, Arizona. During a time in Death Valley, he befriended Death Valley Scotty, becoming involved in a swindle that resulted in the so-called "Battle of Wingate Pass". He arrived in the Twentynine Palms, California area in 1910. In the area that became Joshua Tree National Park, he became acquainted with local outlaw and cattle rustler Jim McHaney, taking care of him in declining health. Keys eventually took over McHaney's properties after McHaney's death, gradually expanding what became the Desert Queen, its name borrowed from the nearby Desert Queen Mine.

Keys married Francis M. Lawton in 1918, and they had seven children together, three of whom died and were buried at the ranch. During a dispute over the Wall Street Mill, Keys shot and killed Worth Bagley. Keys was convicted of murder and went to San Quentin Prison, where Keys educated himself in the library. Keys was paroled in 1950 and was pardoned in 1956 through the efforts of Erle Stanley Gardner, author of the Perry Mason novels.

Mining equipment at the ranch includes an arrastra and a stamp mill for ore processing. Other buildings include an adobe barn, a schoolhouse, a tack shed, machine shed, cemetery and a variety of houses and cabins.

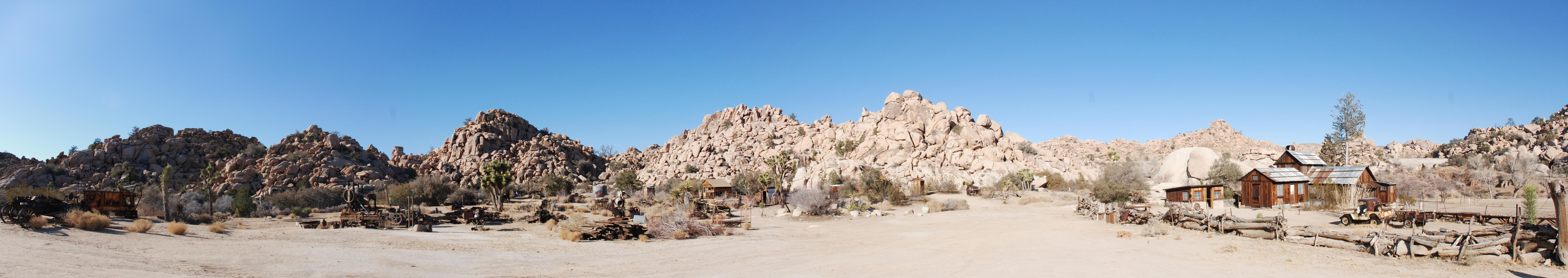
Panorama of the ranch yard

Park rangers provide guided walking tours of the ranch from October through May. Tours are limited in size and must be booked in advance.

== Gallery ==
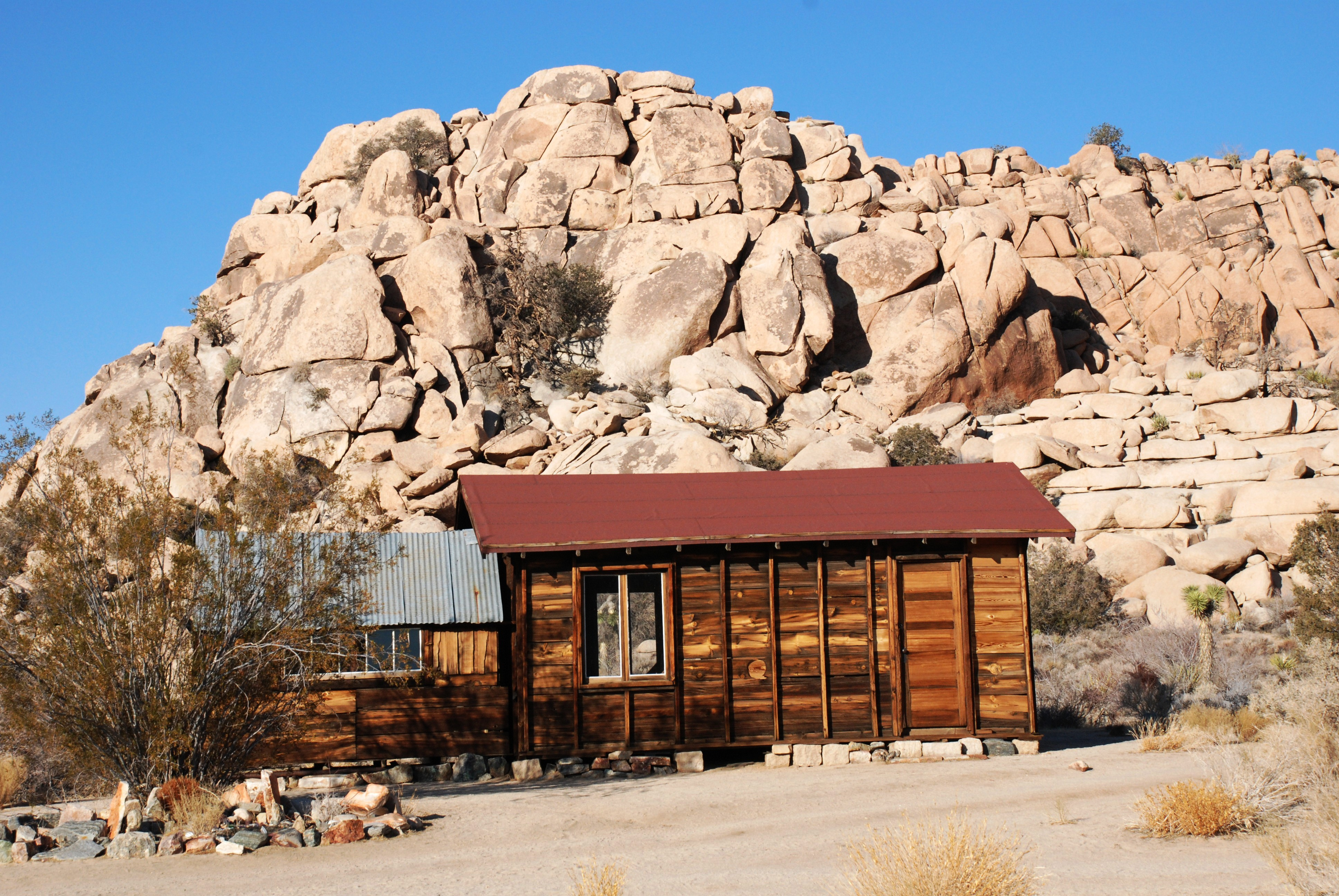
School house

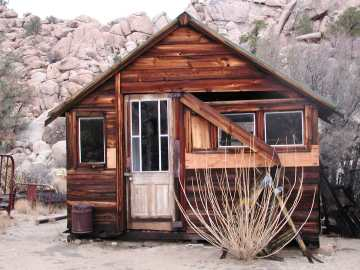
Guest house

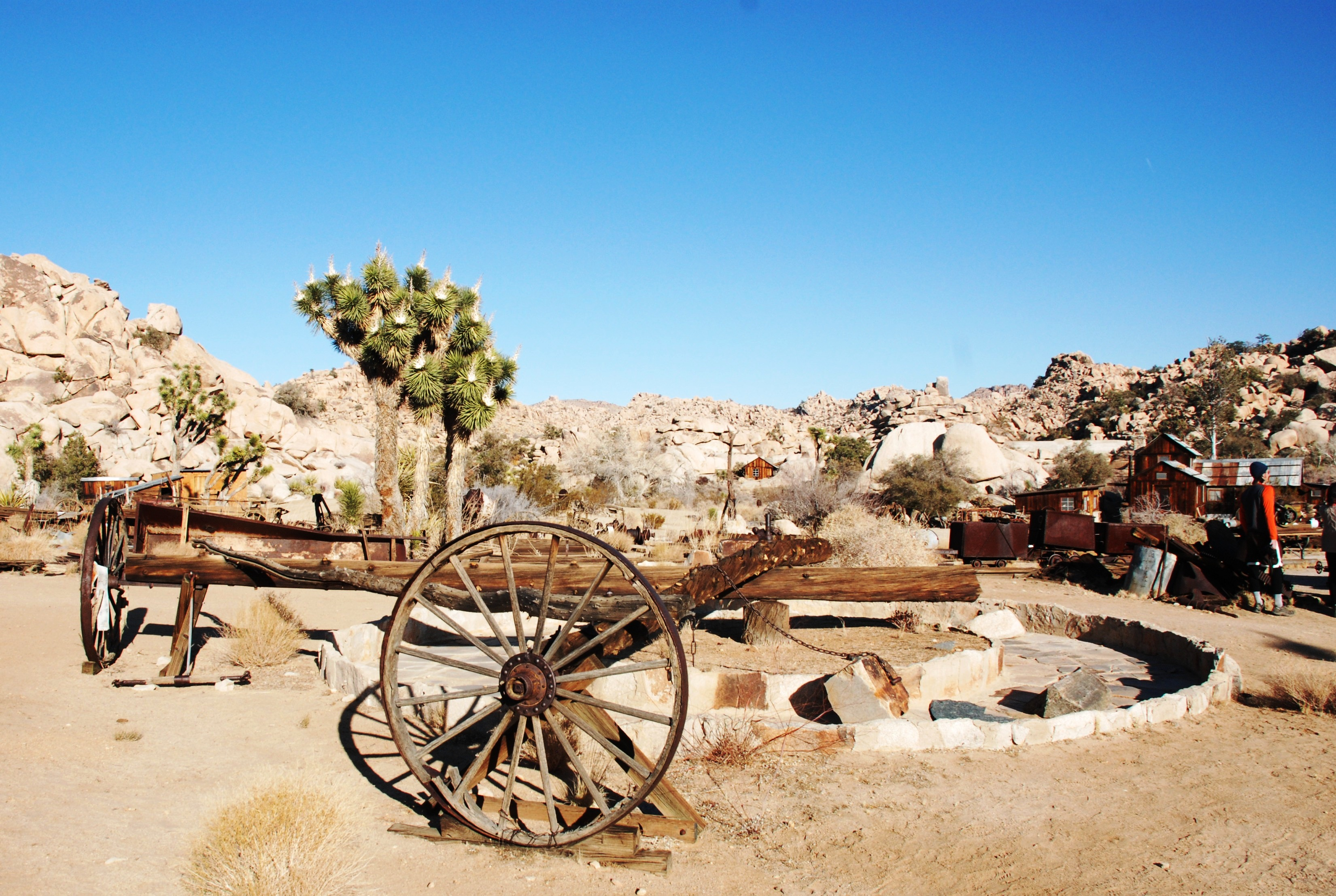
Oxen pulled mill used to crush ore during gold extraction

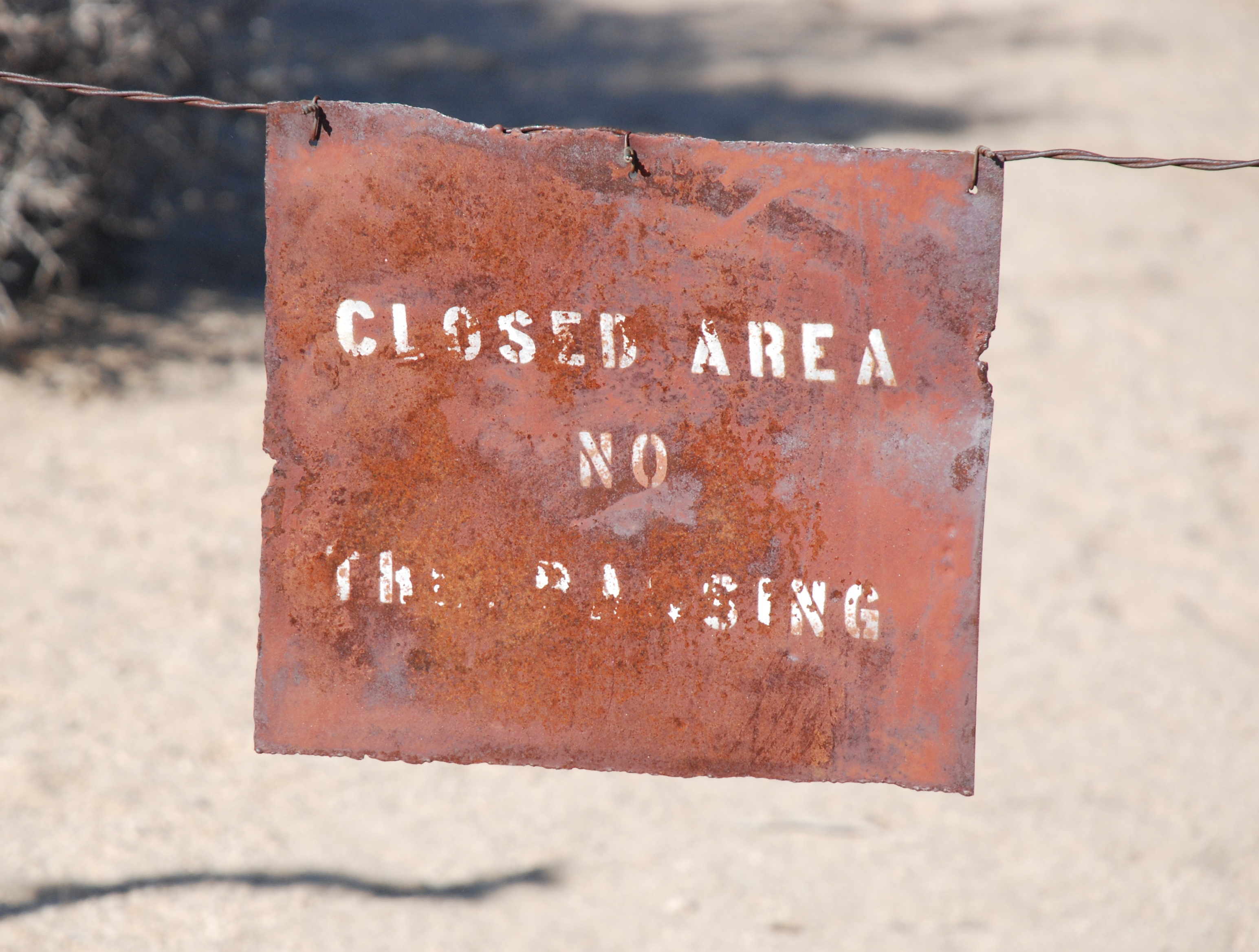
Closed area no trespassing sign

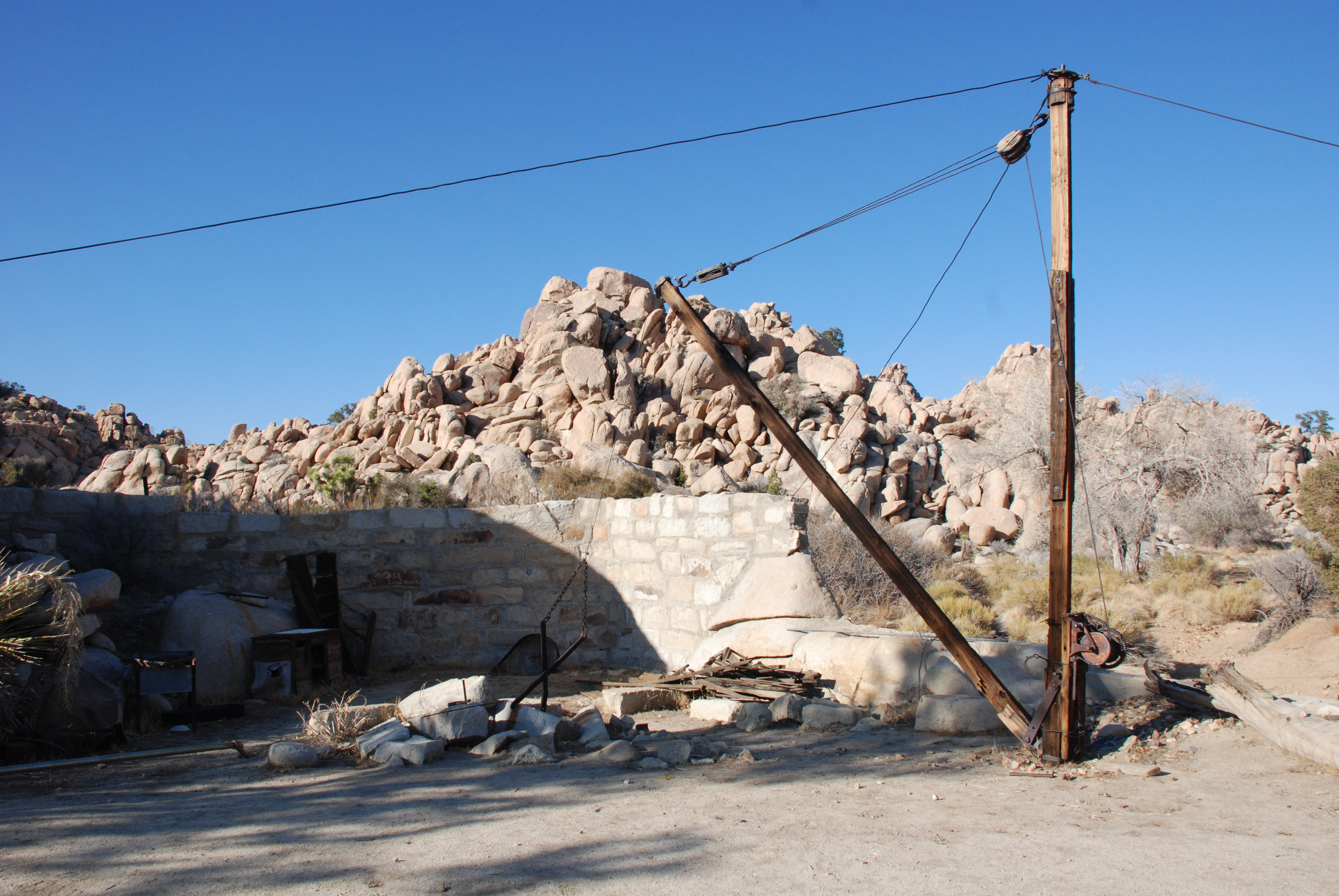
Flood control wall and crane used to build it

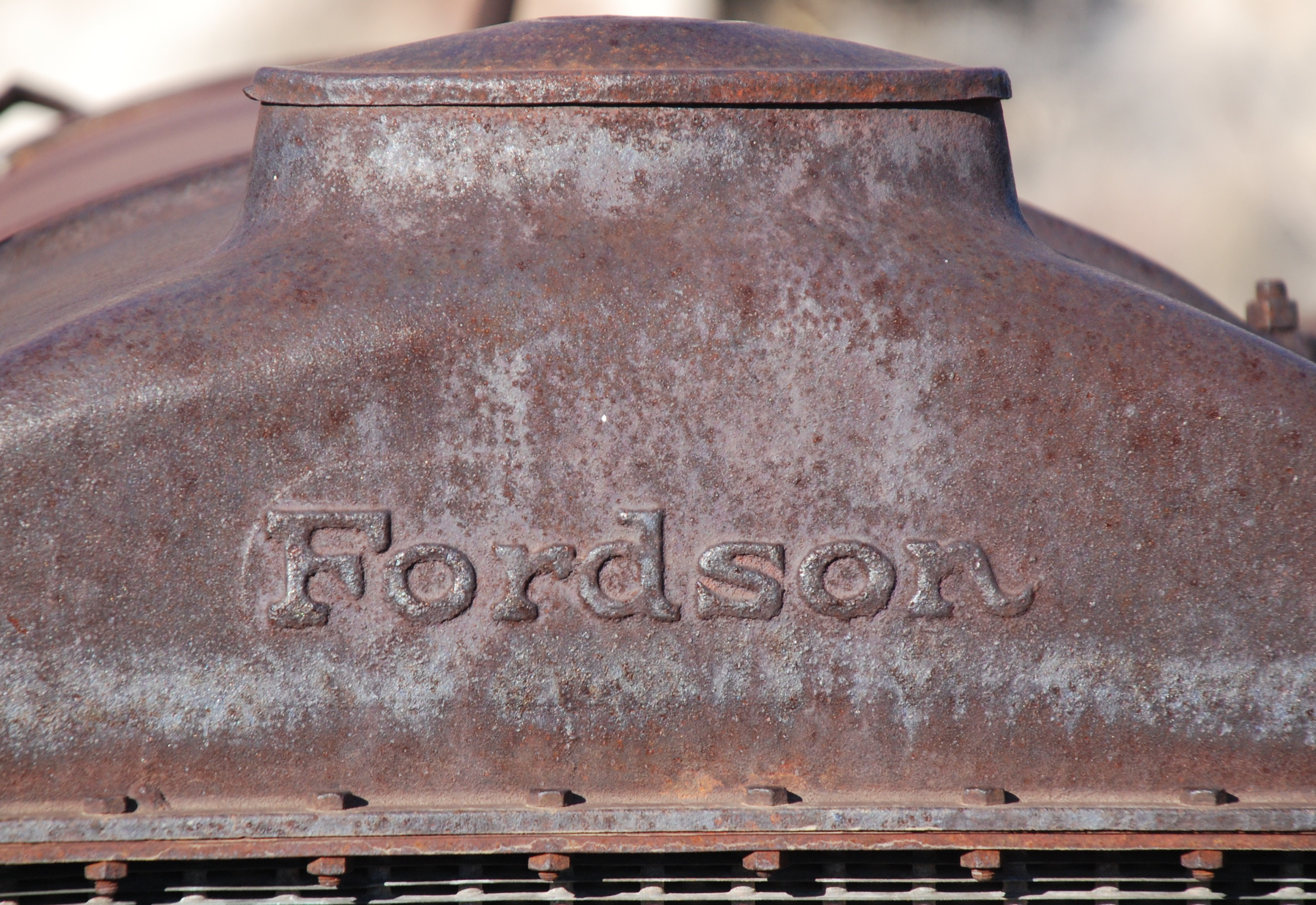
Fordson tractor detail

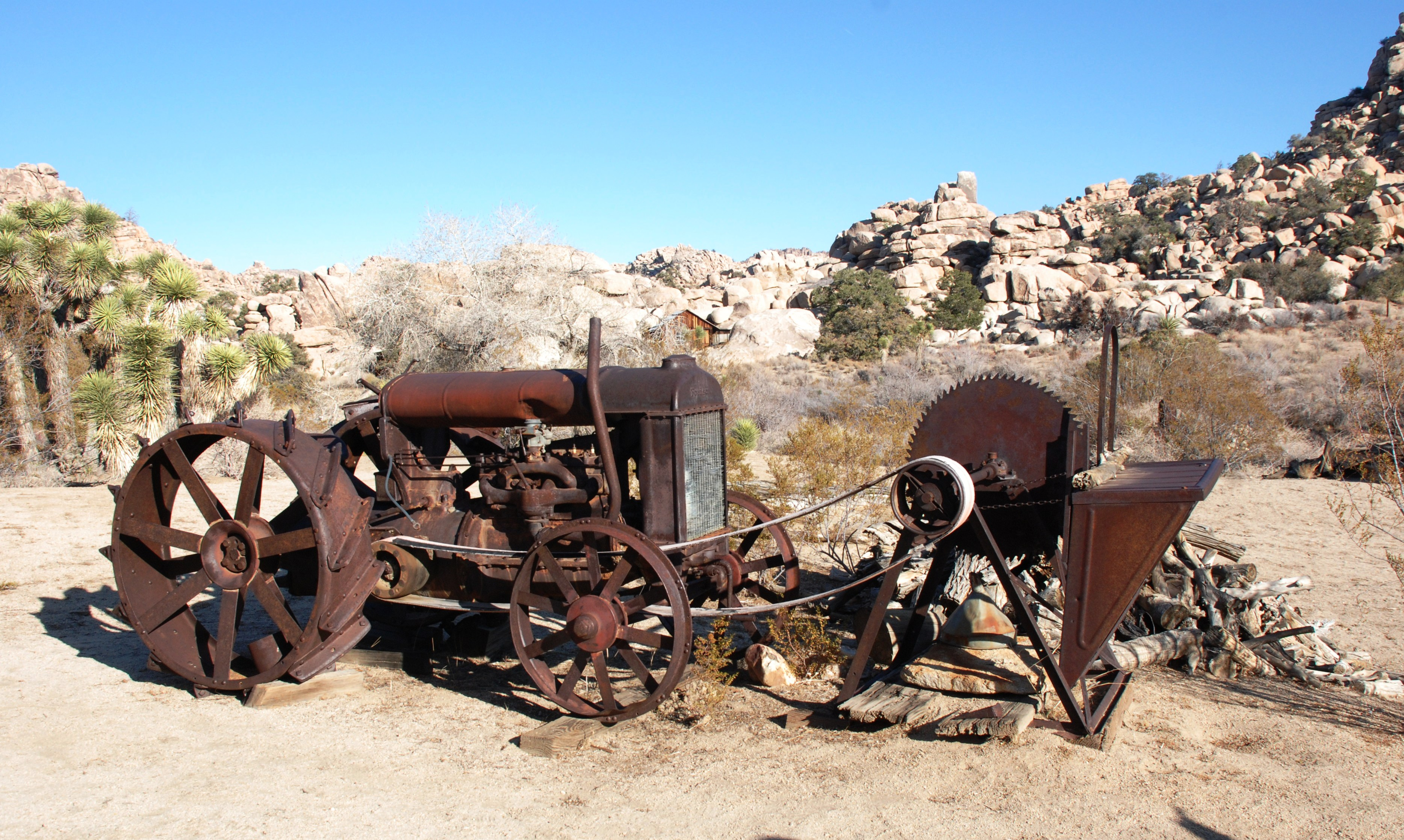
Fordson tractor attached to circular saw

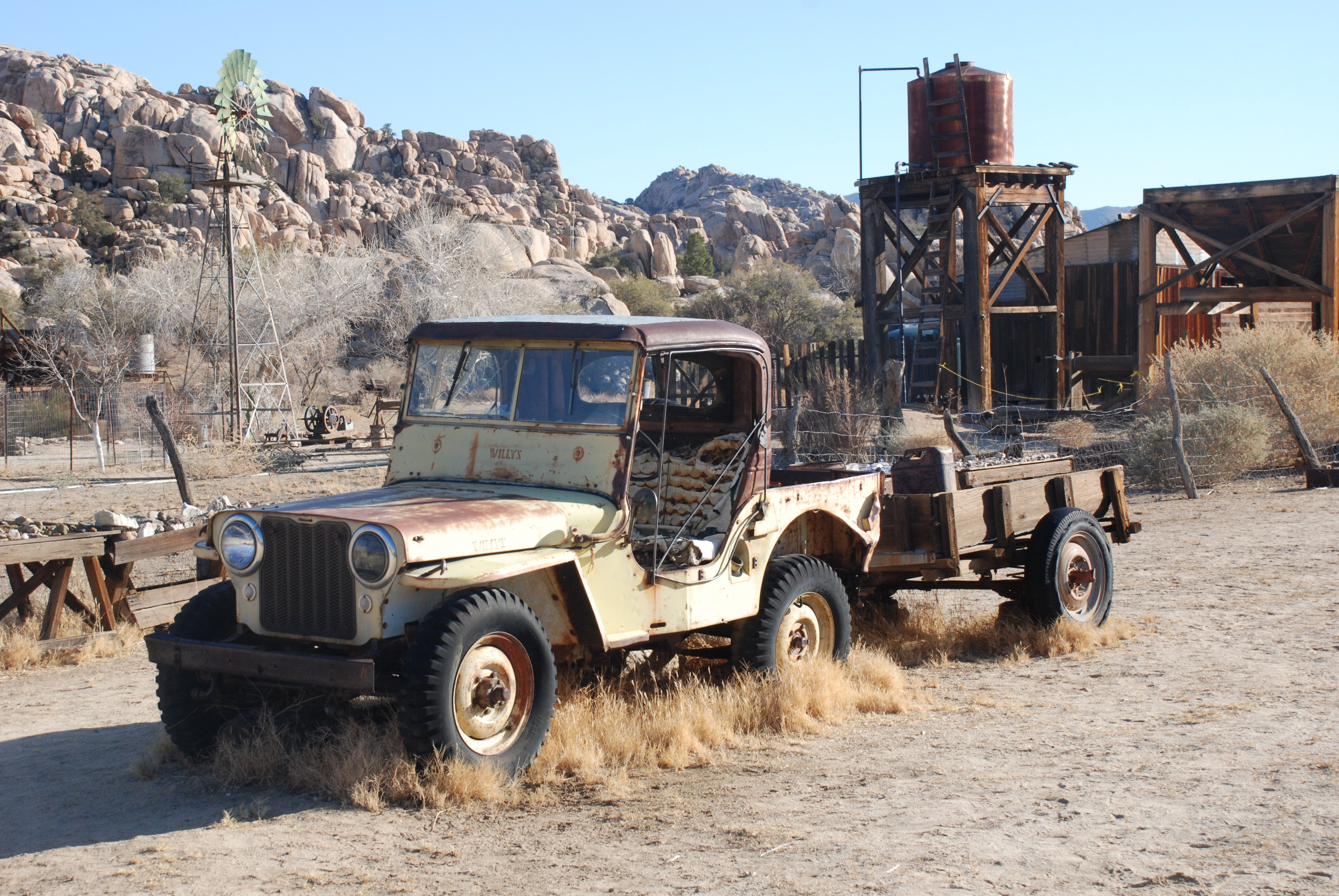
Willys Jeep

== See also ==
- Cow Camp, Jim McHaney's outlaw camp
- Wall Street Mill
- Barker Dam
