= Red Mountain, California =

Unincorporated community in California, United States

- Unincorporated community
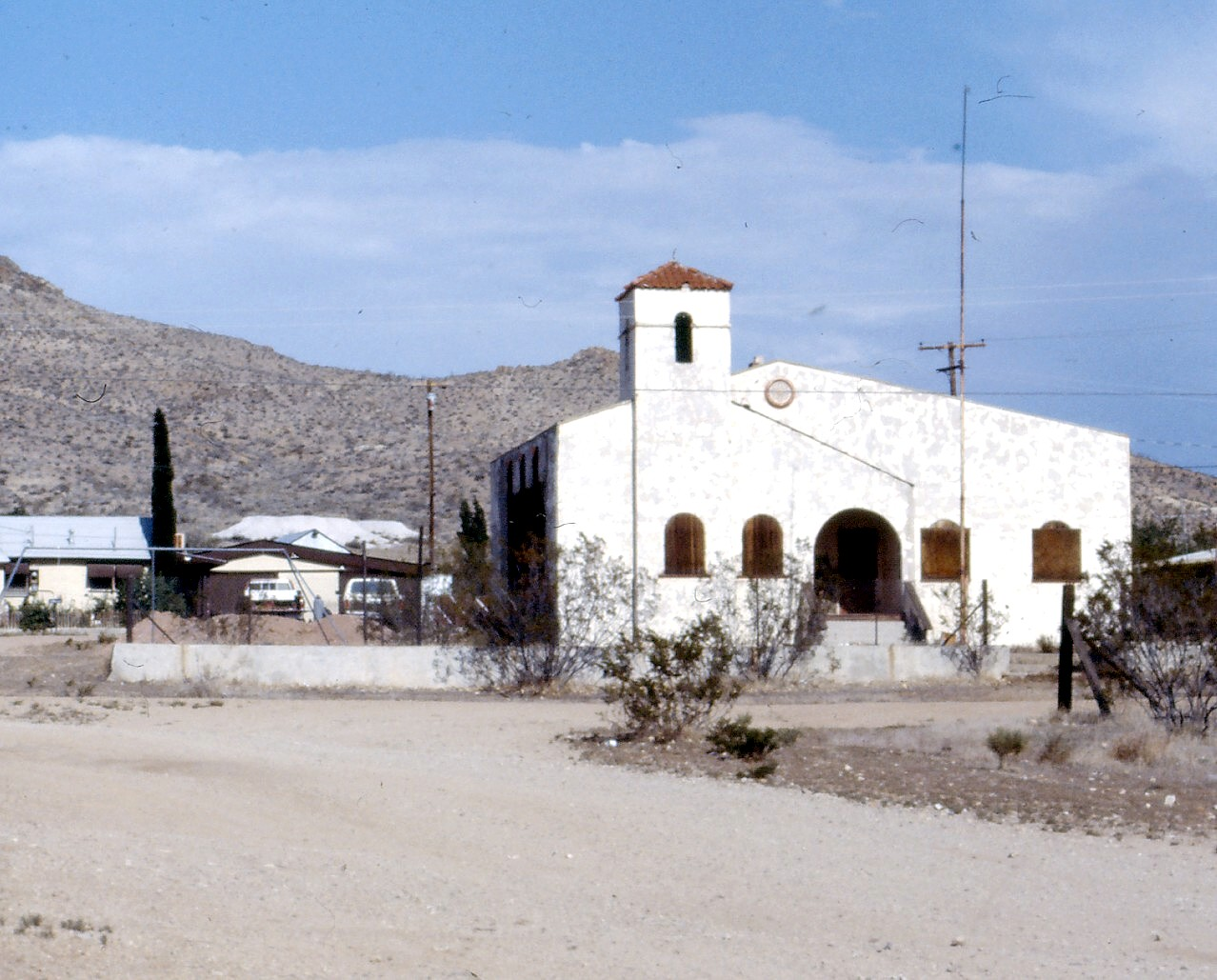
- An abandoned school in Red Mountain

- Location within California Location within the United States
- Coordinates: 35°21′30″N 117°37′00″W
- Country: United States
- State: California
- County: San Bernardino
- Elevation: 3,401 ft (1,037 m)

Population (2010)
  - Total: 131
- Time zone: UTC-8 (Pacific (PST))
  - Summer (DST): UTC-7 (PDT)
- ZIP code: 93558
- Area codes: 442/760
- GNIS feature ID: 1661291

Red Mountain, formerly known as Osdick, is an unincorporated community in San Bernardino County, California, United States.

Red Mountain was established in 1919 as Osdick, a silver mine boom town Red Mountain is 32 miles (51 km) south-southwest of Trona, part of the mining district of Randsburg, California and Johannesburg, California.

Red Mountain has a post office with ZIP code 93558. The post office opened under the name Osdick in 1922 and changed its name to Red Mountain in 1929.

In 2022, the community received a $1.5 million grant to clean sediment of arsenic from historic gold and silver mining from the kelly mine complex.
