= Wall Street Mill =

- U.S. National Register of Historic Places
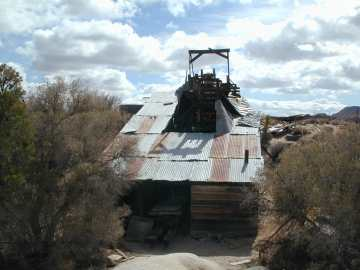

- Location within California Location within the United States
- Nearest city: Twentynine Palms, California
- Coordinates: 34°2′10″N 116°7′59″W
- Built: 1933
- Architect: William F. Keys
- NRHP reference No.: 75000176
- Added to NRHP: November 12, 1975

The Wall Street Mill in Joshua Tree National Park was a complete and operable gold ore crushing mill featuring late-19th century two-stamp mill machinery. Consequently, the significance encompasses the mill machinery, the building which houses it, the well which supplied water for the mill's operation, and the well pump. It is the only gold ore crushing mill in the region that retains integrity.

The stamp mill building is framed with heavy timber and built on a downward sloping hillside to take advantage of gravity in the milling process. The roof and some of the exterior walls are covered with corrugated sheet metal, while some of the exterior walls have either vertical or horizontal wooden siding. At the top of the building a long wooden ramp supports the track of an ore tramway which carried ore from where it was unloaded from trucks to the top of the mill above the two-stamp Baker Iron Works crusher. A gasoline engine powered the mill; it was built by the Western Gas Engine Company of Los Angeles. A Myer concentrating table was used in separating the gold from the ore.

The complex included the mill, a well, a bunkhouse and an outhouse. The supporting buildings are largely ruinous.

The mill was built by Bill Keys, a local rancher and miner, using equipment moved from Pinon Wells. In the 1940s, Keys was involved in a dispute with Worth Bagley over access to the Wall Street Mill. Keys shot and killed Bagley in 1943. Keys then turned himself and was convicted of manslaughter. He was sent to San Quentin State Penitentiary for 10 years. His wife Frances wrote to lawyer Earle Stanley Gardner for help and, with the lawyer's aide, had the case reopened. They found many facts that were not brought out during the trial, leading to Keys's release. He served five years of a ten-year sentence and ultimately received a full pardon. Upon arriving back home from prison, Keys erected a stone commemorating the event with the inscription "Here is where Worth Bagley bit the dust at the hand of W. F. Keys, May 11, 1943." The marker is not a part of the Wall Street Mill historic district.

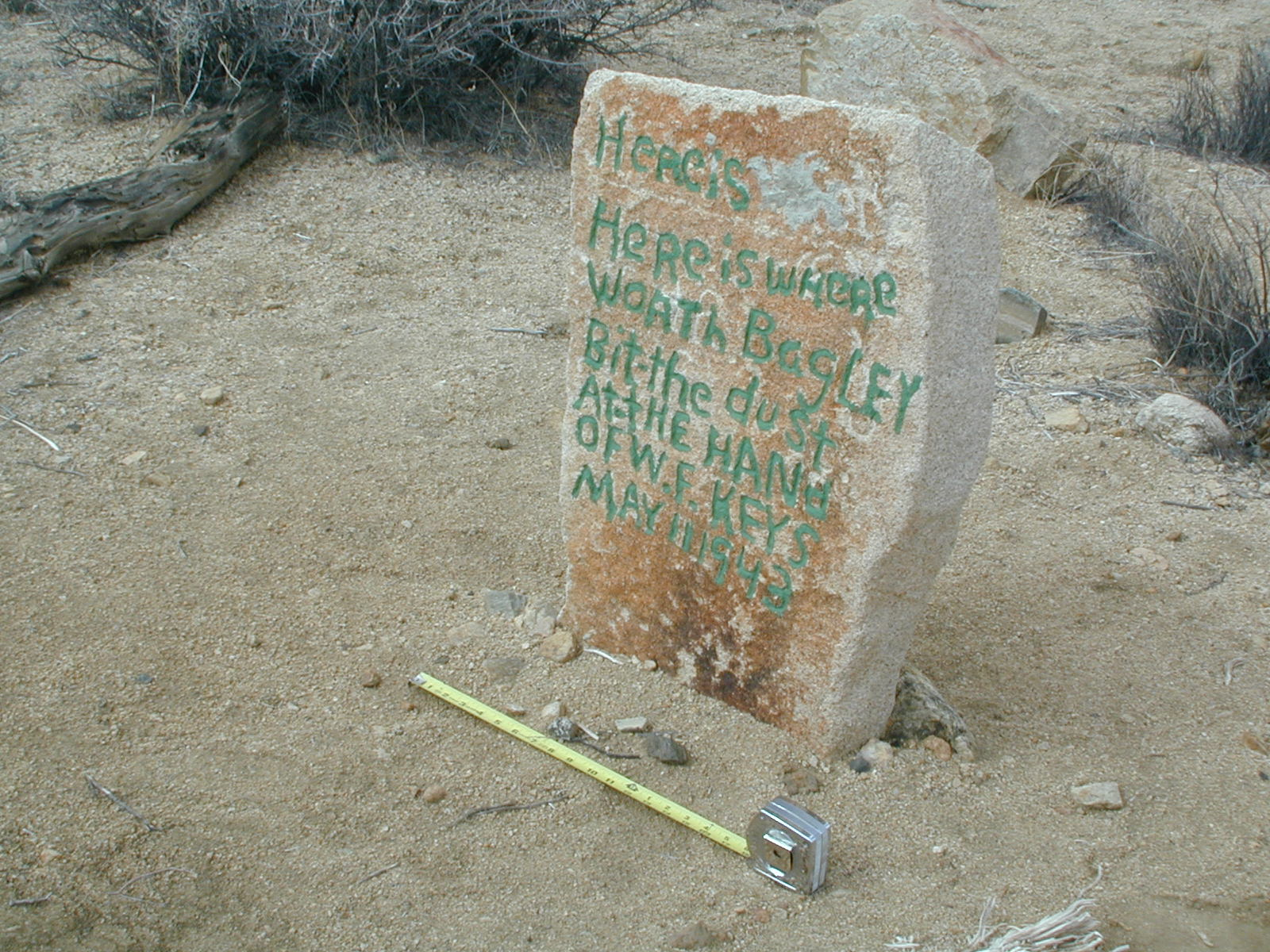
Worth Bagley Stone. The green paint within the lettering was a modern-day act of vandalism.

== See also ==
- Keys Desert Queen Ranch
- Desert Queen Mine
- Cow Camp
- Barker Dam
