= Piute Pass Archeological District =

Archaeological site in California, United States

- U.S. National Register of Historic Places
- U.S. Historic district
- Nearest city: Needles, California
- Area: 4,313 acres (1,745 ha)
- NRHP reference No.: 73000429
- Added to NRHP: August 14, 1973

The Piute Pass Archeological District is an archaeological district located along Piute Creek in eastern San Bernardino County, California. The district encompasses the area around the historic Fort Piute and includes a variety of prehistoric and historic resources. The Piute Pass area was inhabited by several Native American tribes dating back to the middle Holocene epoch. The Patayan people lived in the area during the late prehistoric period, while the Chemehuevi people lived there after the Patayan and through the early historic period. Both groups left petroglyphs in the area, and remains of Chemehuevi habitation sites have also been discovered. After European settlers came to the region, the pass became the site of Fort Piute, a U.S. Army redoubt which protected travelers along the Mojave Road.

The district was added to the National Register of Historic Places on August 14, 1973.
