= Barker Dam (California) =

- U.S. National Register of Historic Places
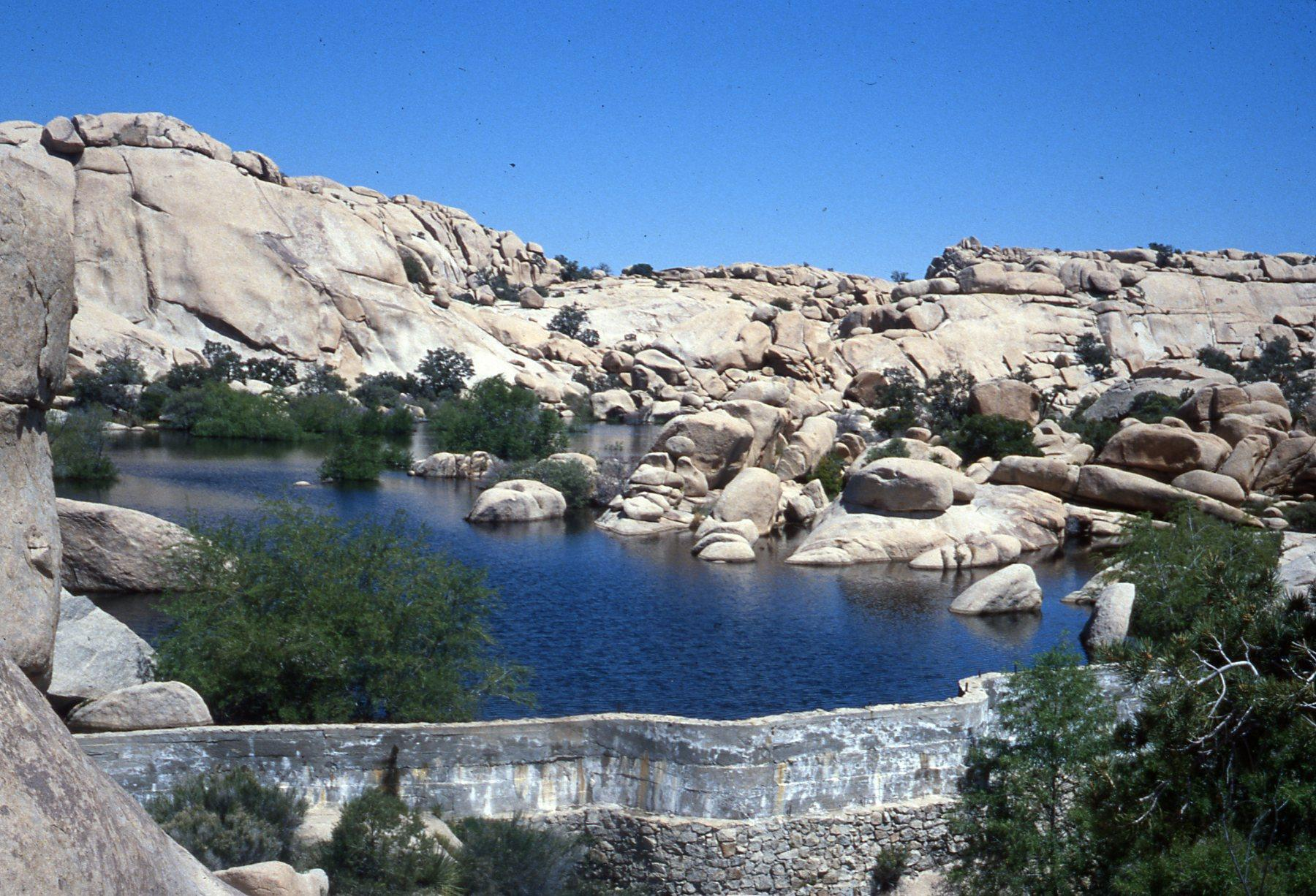
- Barker Dam and full reservoir in 1978

- Location within California Location within the United States
- Nearest city: Twentynine Palms, California
- Coordinates: 34°01′51″N 116°08′46″W
- Built: 1900; 126 years ago
- Architect: Barker, C.O.; Keys, W.F.
- NRHP reference No.: 75000173
- Added to NRHP: October 29, 1975

Barker Dam, also known as Big Horn Dam, is a dam with water-storage reservoir located in Joshua Tree National Park in California. The dam was constructed by early cattlemen, including C. O. Barker, in 1900. It was raised in 1949 by rancher William F. Keys. It is situated between Queen Valley and the Wonderland of Rocks near the Wall Street Mill. It is a gathering place for desert wildlife, including many species of birds and desert bighorn sheep. Visitors can reach the dam via a short loop trail from a nearby parking lot off Barker Dam Road, and can see Native American petroglyphs a short distance to the west. There is also good bouldering on side trails near the dam. The park offers a Barker Dam Nature Hike led by a ranger.

The lowest 9 feet (2.7 m) of the dam, the original portion, was constructed of concrete surfaced with stone on the downstream side. The height of the dam was raised an additional six feet with concrete in 1949–1950. The dam has several indentations. An inscription at top reads: "Big Horn Dam Built by Willis Keys, W.F. Keyes, Phyllis M. Keys, 1949–1950."

== Hiking trails ==
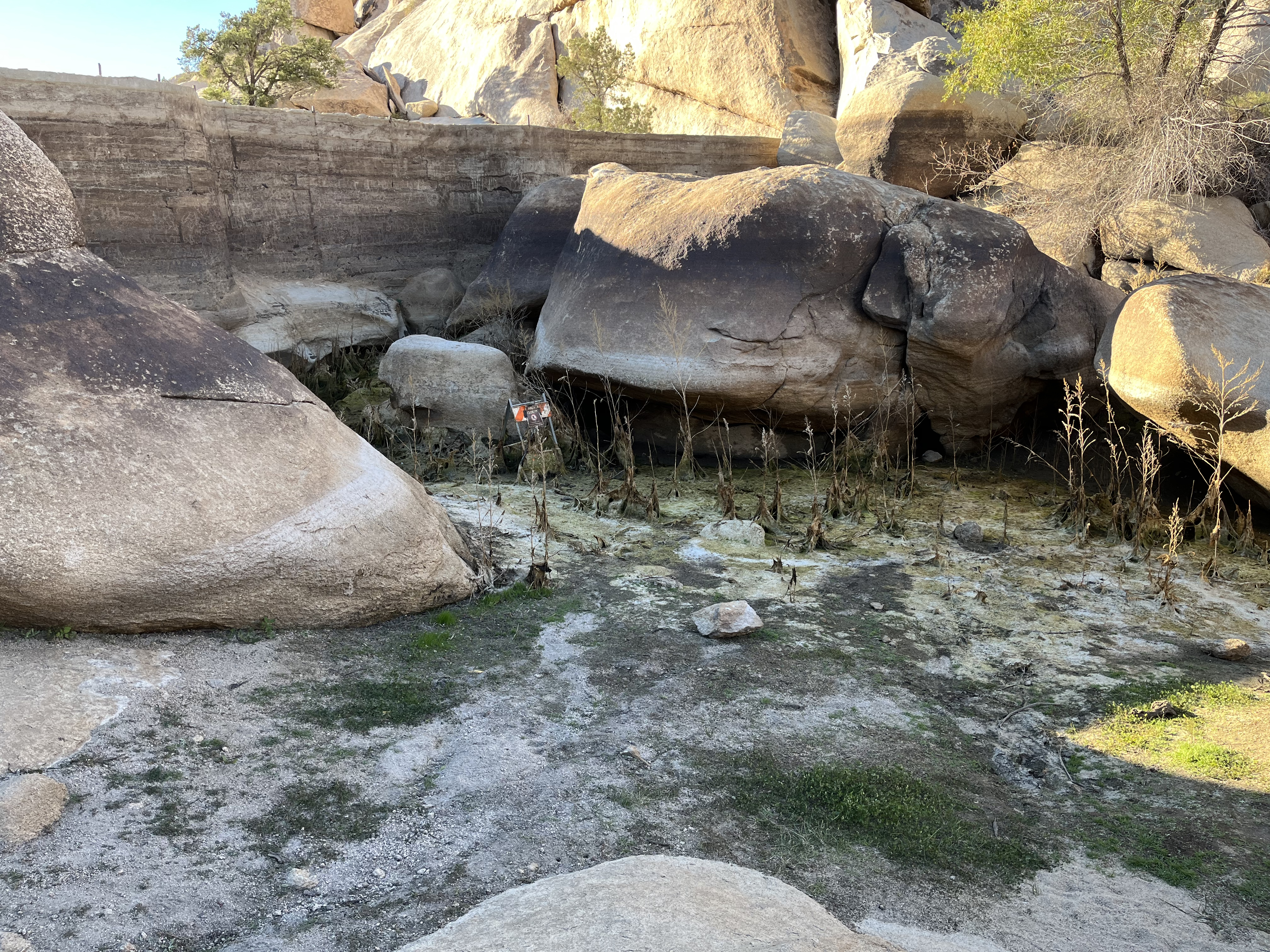
Barker Dam viewed from its almost dry reservoir in 2022

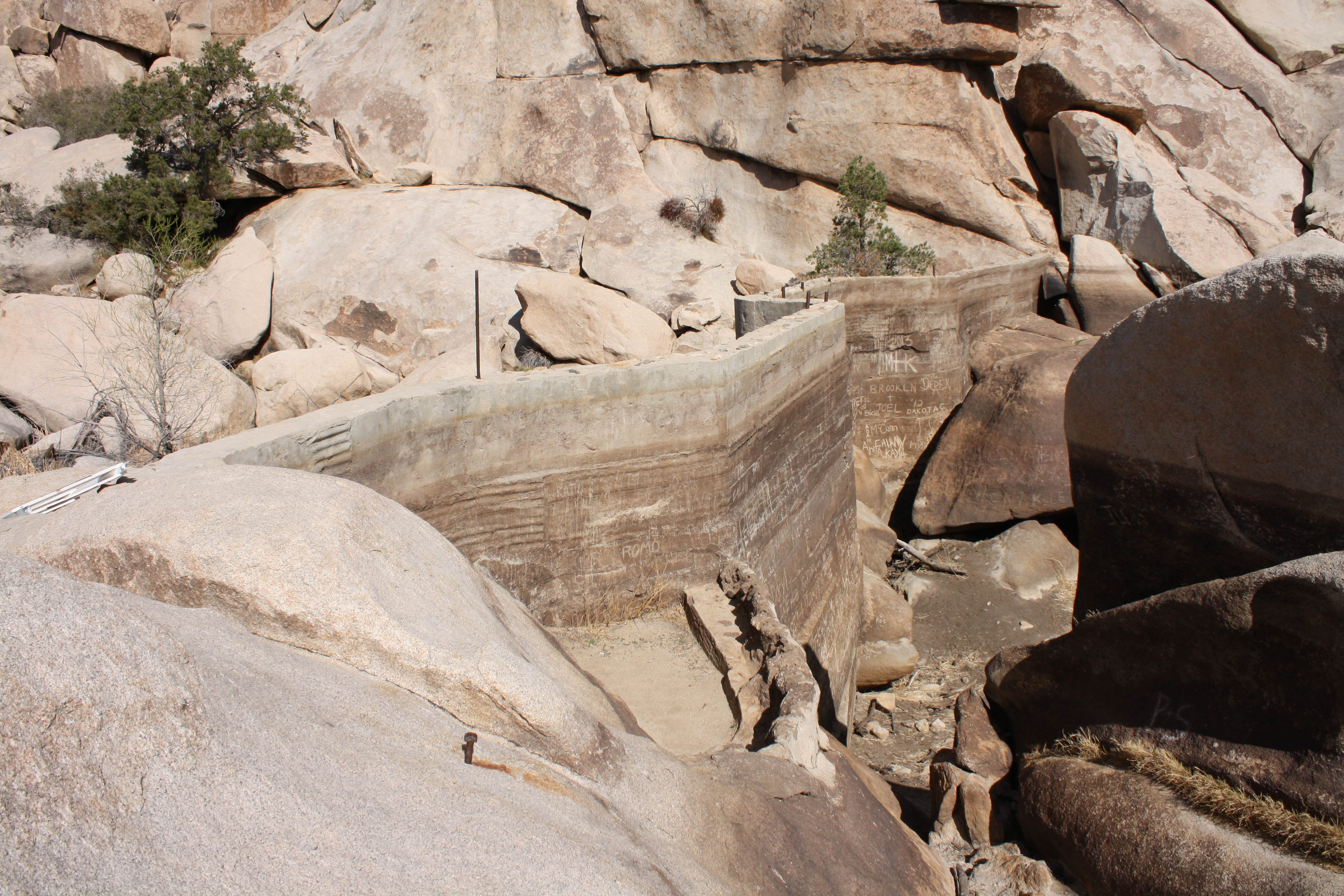
Barker Dam in 2013

The Barker Dam Loop trail is 1.5 miles (2.4 km) round trip and has little elevation gain. It goes from the parking lot at Barker Dam, past the dam and several good boulder climbing areas and a wall of petroglyphs. The trail offers good birding near the lake and at several spots along the trail that are surrounded by brush. It is a popular trail and is crowded midday.

Barker Dam is listed on the National Register of Historic Places.

== See also ==
- List of lakes in California
