= Cow Camp =

- U.S. National Register of Historic Places
- U.S. Historic district
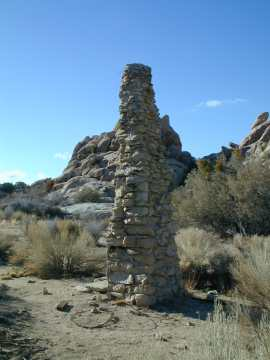
- Chimney from a ruined building at Cow Camp, Joshua Tree National Park, California

- Location within California
- Nearest city: Twentynine Palms, California
- Coordinates: 34°2′15″N 116°10′2″W
- Built: 1880
- Architect: McHaney, James; Keys, William F.
- NRHP reference No.: 75000228
- Added to NRHP: October 29, 1975

Cow Camp, located in Joshua Tree National Park, was associated with cattle rustling in the 1880s and 1890s. It was then later used as a line camp for cattle ranching. A stone chimney, two small dams, watering troughs and a well remain. One dam was built by local rancher and character William F. Keys.

The camp was first established by the "McHaney Gang" in the late 1880s. Cattle rustlers used the camp into the 1890s. Jim McHaney reputedly murdered the discoverer of the Desert Queen Mine before losing it to a bank, then sold Cow Camp in 1894 to George Myers. McHaney eventually was convicted of counterfeiting $20 gold pieces in gold-plated lead and was sentenced to seventeen years in jail. In the 1920s Bill Keys, who had inherited McHaney's holdings, took over Cow Camp as part of his ranching operation.

== See also ==
- Keys Desert Queen Ranch
- Wall Street Mill
