= List of California railroads =

The following railroads operate in the U.S. state of California.

== Common freight carriers ==
Freight carrier information is current since 2021.

Class I
Name	Carrier Code	Parent company	Route miles
BNSF Railway	BNSF	Berkshire Hathaway	2,114
Union Pacific Railroad	UP	Union Pacific Corporation	3,292

Class III
Name	Carrier Code	Parent company	Route miles
Arizona and California Railroad	ARZC	Genesee & Wyoming	190 (84 in CA)
California Northern Railroad	CFNR	Genesee & Wyoming	210
Central Oregon and Pacific Railroad	CORP	Genesee & Wyoming	305 (56 in CA)
Central Valley Union Railroad	CVUR		12
Lake County Railroad	LCR/LCY	Frontier Rail	54
Napa Valley Wine Train	NVRR		18
Niles Canyon Railway	NCRY	Pacific Locomotive Association (PLA)	10
Northwestern Pacific Railroad	NWP	Sonoma-Marin Area Rail Transit	63
Pacific Sun Railroad	PSRR	Watco	62
Sacramento Southern Railroad	SSR	State of California	3
Sacramento Valley Railroad	SAV	Patriot Rail Company	7
San Diego and Imperial Valley Railroad	SDIY	Genesee & Wyoming	1
San Joaquin Valley Railroad	SJVR	Genesee & Wyoming	297
San Francisco Bay Railroad	SFBR		7
Santa Cruz, Big Trees and Pacific Railway	SCBG	Roaring Camp, Inc.	9
Santa Cruz and Monterey Bay Railway	SCMB	Progressive Rail, Inc.	31
Santa Maria Valley Railroad	SMVRR		14
Sierra Northern Railway	SERA		68
Stockton Terminal and Eastern Railroad	STE	OmniTrax	25
Trona Railway	TRC	Searles Valley Minerals/Nirma	31
Ventura County Railroad	VCRR	Genesee & Wyoming	9
West Isle Line, Inc.	WFS	Nutrien	5
Yreka Western Railroad	YW	Railmark Holdings	9

Switching and terminal
Name	Carrier Code	Parent company	Route miles
Central California Traction Company	CCT	BNSF/UPRR	96
Los Angeles Junction Railway	LAJ	BNSF	64
Modesto and Empire Traction Company	MET		49
Oakland Terminal Railway	OTR	BNSF/UPRR	10
Pacific Harbor Line, Inc.	PHL	Anacostia Rail Holdings Company	59
Quincy Railroad	QRR		3
Richmond Pacific Railroad	RPRC		6

=== Other ===
- Mare Island Rail Service (MIRS) at Mare Island
- Mojave Northern Railroad, a private carrier industrial railway owned by Cemex
- Oakland Global Rail Enterprise (OGRE) at the Port of Oakland
  - West Oakland Pacific Railroad
  - Port of Oakland Railway (POAK)
- Southern California Railroad (SCRR) in Plaster City
- USG Corporation (USG) in Plaster City

== Passenger carriers ==
=== Intercity ===
- Amtrak (AMTK): California Zephyr, Coast Starlight, Southwest Chief, Sunset Limited, Texas Eagle
  - Amtrak California (CDTX): Capitol Corridor, Pacific Surfliner and Gold Runner
- California High-Speed Rail (under construction)
- Brightline West (under construction)

=== Commuter rail ===
- Altamont Corridor Express (ACE)
- Caltrain (JPBX)
- Coaster (SDNX)
- Metrolink (SCAX)
  - Arrow
- Sonoma–Marin Area Rail Transit (SMART)
- North Valley Rail (planned)

=== Local ===
- Bay Area Rapid Transit (BART)
  - eBART
  - Oakland Airport Connector (people mover)
- Los Angeles Metro Rail (LACZ)
- San Francisco Municipal Railway (MUNI)
  - Muni Metro
  - Market Street Railway (E Embarcadero and F Market & Wharves lines)
  - San Francisco cable car system
- OC Streetcar (under construction)
- SacRT light rail (SCRT)
- San Diego Trolley (SDTI)
- VTA light rail (VTA)
- Sprinter (SDNX)

=== Excursion ===
- Angels Flight
- Calico and Odessa Railroad (C&OR)
- California State Railroad Museum (CSRM)
  - Sacramento Southern Railroad
- Fillmore and Western Railway (FWRY)
- Justi Creek Railway
- Napa Valley Wine Train (NVRR)
- Niles Canyon Railway (NCRY)
- Pacific Coast Railroad
- Pacific Southwest Railway Museum (PSRM)
- Placerville and Sacramento Valley Railroad
- Poway-Midland Railroad
- Redwood Valley Railway
- Roaring Camp & Big Trees Narrow Gauge Railroad (RCBT)
- Sacramento Southern Railroad (SSRR)
- Santa Cruz, Big Trees and Pacific Railway (SCBG)
- Sierra Railroad (SERA)
  - California Western Railroad (also known as the Skunk Train) (CWR)
  - Railtown 1897 State Historic Park
  - Sacramento RiverTrain (SYPD)
- Society for the Preservation of Carter Railroad Resources
- Western Pacific Railroad Museum (WPRM)
- Western Railway Museum
- Yosemite Mountain Sugar Pine Railroad (YMSP)
- Yreka Western Railroad (YW)

=== Amusement park ===
- Disneyland Monorail
- Disneyland Railroad
- Ghost Town & Calico Railroad

== Defunct railroads ==
Common carriers
Name	Mark	System (Note: This is one or more of the Class I railroads that the railroad became part of, if any.)	From	To	Successor	Notes
Alameda County Railway			1888	1889	Alameda County Terminal Railway	
Alameda County Terminal Railway			1889	1891	California Railway	
Alameda and San Joaquin Railroad		WP	1895	1903	Western Pacific Railway	
Alameda Belt Line	ABL	ATSF/ WP	1925	2007	N/A	
Albion Railroad			1921	1930	N/A	
Albion River Railroad		NWP (ATSF)	1885	1891	Albion and Southeastern Railway	
Albion and Southeastern Railway		NWP (ATSF)	1902	1905	Fort Bragg and Southeastern Railroad	
Almaden Branch Railroad		SP	1887	1887	South Pacific Coast Railway	
Amador Branch Railroad		SP	1875	1888	Northern Railway	
Amador Central Railroad	AMC		1908	1997	Amador Foothills Railroad	
Amador Foothills Railroad			1998	2004	N/A	
Arcata and Mad River Railroad	AMR		1881	1985	Eureka Southern Railroad	
Arcata Transportation Company			1875	1881	Arcata and Mad River Railroad	
Arizona and California Railway		ATSF	1903	1911	California, Arizona and Santa Fe Railway	
Atchison, Topeka and Santa Fe Railway	ATSF	ATSF	1901	1996	Burlington Northern and Santa Fe Railway	
Atlantic and Pacific Railroad		ATSF	1866	1897	Santa Fe Pacific Railroad	
Bakersfield and Ventura Railroad			1908	1911	Ventura County Railway	
Bakersfield and Ventura Railway			1903	1906	Bakersfield and Ventura Railroad	
Barnwell and Searchlight Railway		ATSF	1906	1911	California, Arizona and Santa Fe Railway	
Bay and Coast Railroad		SP	1877	1887	South Pacific Coast Railway	
Bay Point and Clayton Railroad	BP&C		1906	1946	U.S. Navy	
Bear Harbor and Eel River Railroad	(?)		1893	1921	Abandoned	
Berkeley Branch Railroad		SP	1876	1888	Northern Railway	
Black Diamond Coal Mining Railroad			1868	1885		
Boca and Loyalton Railroad		WP	1900	1916	Western Pacific Railroad	
Bodie Railway and Lumber Company			1893	1906	Mono Lake Railway and Lumber Company	
Bodie Railway and Lumber Company			1881	1882	Bodie and Benton Railway and Commercial Company	
Bodie and Benton Railway and Commercial Company			1882	1893	Bodie Railway and Lumber Company	
Bucksport and Elk River Railroad			1884	1932	Bucksport and Elk River Railway	
Bucksport and Elk River Railway			1932	1952	N/A	
Burlington Northern Inc.	BN		1970	1981	Burlington Northern Railroad	
Burlington Northern Railroad	BN		1981	1996	Burlington Northern and Santa Fe Railway	
Butte County Railroad		SP	1903	1915	N/A	Leased the Chico and Northern Railroad
Butte and Plumas Railway		WP	1902	1905	Western Pacific Railway	
Cahuenga Valley Railroad			1888	1902	Los Angeles and Pacific Railway	
California Railway			1891	1896	Alameda, Oakland and Piedmont Electric Railroad	
California, Arizona and Santa Fe Railway		ATSF	1911	1963	Atchison, Topeka and Santa Fe Railway	
California Central Railroad			1912	1930	N/A	
California Central Railroad		SP	1857	1868	California and Oregon Railroad	
California Central Railway		ATSF	1887	1889	Southern California Railway	
California Eastern Railway		ATSF	1895	1911	California, Arizona and Santa Fe Railway	
California Midland Railroad		NWP (ATSF)	1902	1903	San Francisco and Northwestern Railway	
California and Mount Diablo Railroad		ATSF	1880	1884	California and Nevada Railroad	
California and Nevada Railroad		ATSF	1884	1902	Oakland and East Side Railroad	
California Northeastern Railway		SP	1905	1911	Oregon Eastern Railway	
California Northern Railroad		SP	1860	1885	Northern California Railroad	
California and Northern Railway		NWP (ATSF)	1900	1904	San Francisco and Northwestern Railway	
California Northwestern Railway		NWP (SP)	1898	1907	Northwestern Pacific Railroad	
California and Oregon Railroad		SP	1865	1870	Central Pacific Railroad	
California Pacific Railroad		SP	1865	1898	Southern Pacific Railroad	
California Pacific Railroad Extension Company		SP	1869	1869	California Pacific Railroad	
California, Shasta and Eastern Railway			1912	1927	N/A	
California Southern Railroad		ATSF	1914	1942	Atchison, Topeka and Santa Fe Railway	
California Southern Railroad		ATSF	1880	1889	Southern California Railway	
California Southern Railroad		SP	1870	1870	Southern Pacific Railroad	
California Southern Extension Railroad		ATSF	1881	1882	California Southern Railroad	
California Street Cable Railroad			1880	1884	Ferries and Cliff House Railway	
California Western Railroad	CWR		1947	2003	N/A	
California Western Railroad and Navigation Company	CWR		1905	1947	California Western Railroad	
Camino, Placerville and Lake Tahoe Railroad	CPLT		1911	1986	N/A	
Carrizo Gorge Railway	CZRY		1997	2012	Pacific Imperial Railroad	
Carson and Colorado Railroad		SP	1881	1892	Carson and Colorado Railway	
Carson and Colorado Railway		SP	1892	1905	Nevada and California Railway	
Cement, Tolenas and Tidewater Railroad			1911	1930	N/A	
Central California Railway		SP	1904	1912	Central Pacific Railway	
Central Pacific Railroad		SP	1861	1899	Central Pacific Railway	
Central Pacific Railway		SP	1899	1959	Southern Pacific Company	
Chico and Northern Railroad		SP	1903	1912	Central Pacific Railway	
Chino Valley Railway			1888	1901	N/A	
Chowchilla Pacific Railway		SP	1913	1924	Visalia Electric Railroad	
Cloverdale and Ukiah Railroad		NWP (SP)	1886	1889	San Francisco and North Pacific Railway	
Coal Fields Railway			1920	1935	N/A	
Coast Line Railway		SP	1905	1917	Southern Pacific Railroad	
Colusa Railroad			1885	1886	Colusa and Lake Railroad	
Colusa and Hamilton Railroad		SP	1911	1917	Southern Pacific Railroad	
Colusa and Lake Railroad			1886	1915	N/A	
Corona and Santa Fe Railway		ATSF	1926	1942	Atchison, Topeka and Santa Fe Railway	
Coronado Railroad (Note: This Coronado Railroad was a rail line connecting San Diego with Coronado, California, a section of which became the San Diego and Arizona Eastern Railway's Coronado Branch until the 1990s. It is not to be confused with the Coronado Railroad in Arizona.)		SP	1886	1908	San Diego Southern Railway	
Crescent City Railway		UP	1906	1915	Riverside, Rialto and Pacific Railroad	
Death Valley Railroad			1914	1931	N/A	
Diamond and Caldor Railway			1904	1952	N/A	
Eel River and Eureka Railroad		NWP (ATSF)	1882	1903	San Francisco and Northwestern Railway	
Elsinore, Pomona and Los Angeles Railway		ATSF	1895	1899	Southern California Railway	
Eureka and Klamath River Railroad		NWP (SP)	1896	1907	Northwestern Pacific Railroad	
Eureka Southern Railroad	EUKA		1984	1992	North Coast Railroad	
Feather River Railway			1939	1966	N/A	
Felton and Pescadero Railroad		SP	1883	1887	South Pacific Coast Railway	
Ferries and Cliff House Railway			1888	1893	Market Street Railway	Steam dummy railway.
Ferris and Lakeview Railway		ATSF	1898	1911	California, Arizona and Santa Fe Railway	
Fernley and Lassen Railway		SP	1909	1912	Central Pacific Railway	
Folsom and Placerville Railroad		SP	1876	1877	Sacramento and Placerville Railroad	
Fort Bragg and Southeastern Railroad		NWP (ATSF)	1903	1907	Northwestern Pacific Railroad	
Freeport Railroad			1863	1865	N/A	
Fresno County Railway		ATSF	1905	1911	California, Arizona and Santa Fe Railway	
Fullerton and Richfield Railway		ATSF	1910	1911	California, Arizona and Santa Fe Railway	
Fulton and Guerneville Railroad		NWP (SP)	1877	1877	San Francisco and North Pacific Railroad	
Geary Street, Park and Ocean Railway			1880	1892	Market Street Railway	Steam dummy line.
Goose Lake and Southern Railway		SP	1908	1912	Central Pacific Railway	
Great Northern Railway	GN	GN	1930	1970	Burlington Northern Railroad	
Great Western Railway of Colorado	GWR		1986	1987	Great Western Railway of Oregon	
Great Western Railway of Oregon	GWR		1987	1997	Lake County Railroad	
Hanford and Summit Lake Railway		SP	1910	1917	Southern Pacific Railroad	
Harbor Belt Line Railroad	HBL		1929	1998	Pacific Harbor Line, Inc.	
Hetch Hetchy Railroad			1915	1949	N/A	
Hetch Hetchy and Yosemite Valleys Railway of California			1900	1943	N/A	
Holton Interurban Railway	HI	SP	1903	1985	Southern Pacific Transportation Company	
Howard Terminal Railway	HT		1917		Part of Port of Oakland Railroad	
Hueneme, Malibu and Port Los Angeles Railway	.		1905	1929		
Humboldt Railroad		NWP (SP)	1901		Northwestern Pacific Railroad	
Imperial and Gulf Railway		SP	1902	1905	Inter-California Railway	
Indian Valley Railroad			1916	1938	N/A	
Indian Valley Railway		WP	1902	1905	Western Pacific Railway	
Inter-California Railway		SP	1904	1935	Southern Pacific Company	
Ione and Eastern Railroad			1904	1908	Amador Central Railroad	
Iron Mountain Railway			1895	1927	N/A	
Kings Lake Shore Railroad			1917	1934	N/A	
Kings River Railway		ATSF	1909	1911	California, Arizona and Santa Fe Railway	
Klamath Lake Railroad			1901	1913	Siskiyou Electric Light and Power Company	
Lake County Railroad	LCR		1997			Still exists as a lessor of the Lake Railway
Lake Tahoe Railway and Transportation Company		SP	1898	1927	Southern Pacific Company	
Laton and Western Railroad		ATSF	1910	1942	California, Arizona and Santa Fe Railway	
Loma Prieta Railroad		SP	1882	1884	Pajaro and Santa Cruz Railroad	
Long Beach Railroad		SP	1887	1888	Southern Pacific Railroad	
Long Beach, Whittier and Los Angeles County Railroad		SP	1887	1888	Southern Pacific Railroad	
Los Angeles County Railroad			1887	1888	Los Angeles and Pacific Railway	
Los Angeles and Glendale Railroad		UP	1887	1888	Los Angeles and Glendale Railway	
Los Angeles and Glendale Railway		UP	1888	1891	Los Angeles Terminal Railway	
Los Angeles and Independence Railroad		SP	1875	1888	Southern Pacific Railroad	
Los Angeles and Pacific Railway			1888	1889	Pasadena and Pacific Railway	
Los Angeles and Redondo Railway			1896	1907	Los Angeles Railway	Became the F Line street railway
Los Angeles, Pasadena and Glendale Railway		UP	1889	1891	Los Angeles Terminal Railway	
Los Angeles and Salt Lake Railroad		UP	1916	1987	Union Pacific Railroad	
Los Angeles and San Diego Beach Railway			1906	1918	Pasadena and Pacific Railway	
Los Angeles and San Diego Railroad		SP	1876	1888	Southern Pacific Railroad	
Los Angeles and San Gabriel Valley Railroad		ATSF	1883	1887	California Central Railway	
Los Angeles and San Pedro Railroad		SP	1868	1874	Southern Pacific Railroad	
Los Angeles and Santa Monica Railroad		ATSF	1886	1887	California Central Railway	
Los Angeles Terminal Railway		UP	1890	1901	San Pedro, Los Angeles and Salt Lake Railroad	
Ludlow and Southern Railway			1902	1931	N/A	
Marin and Napa Railroad		NWP (SP)	1886	1889	San Francisco and North Pacific Railway	
Marysville Railroad		SP	1867	1868	California and Oregon Railroad	
Marysville and Susanville Railroad		WP	1904	1905	Western Pacific Railway	
McCloud River Railroad	MR		1897	1992	McCloud Railway	
Mill Valley and Mount Tamalpais Scenic Railway			1896	1913	Mount Tamalpais and Muir Woods Railway	
Minarets and Western Railway			1921	1932	N/A	
Minkler Southern Railway		ATSF	1913	1942	Atchison, Topeka and Santa Fe Railway	
Modesto Interurban Railway			1909	1911	Modesto and Empire Traction Company	
Modesto Terminal Company			1920	1938	Modesto Interurban Railway	
Modoc Northern Railroad	MNRR		2005	2009	Union Pacific Railroad	
Modoc Northern Railway		SP	1908	1912	Central Pacific Railway	
Mojave Northern Railroad			1914	1928	Northwestern Portland Cement Company	
Monterey Railroad		SP	1880	1888	Southern Pacific Railroad	
Monterey Extension Railroad		SP	1888	1888	Southern Pacific Railroad	
Monterey and Salinas Valley Railroad		SP	1874	1879	Pacific Improvement Company	
Mount Tamalpais and Muir Woods Railway			1913	1930	N/A	
Napa Valley Railroad		SP	1864	1869	California Pacific Railroad Extension Company	
National City and Otay Railway		SP	1887	1908	San Diego Southern Railway	
Nevada and California Railway		SP	1905	1912	Central Pacific Railway	
Nevada and California Railroad		SP	1884	1893	Nevada–California–Oregon Railway	
Nevada–California–Oregon Railway		SP	1888	1945	Central Pacific Railway	
Nevada County Narrow Gauge Railroad			1874	1943	N/A	
Nevada and Oregon Railroad		SP	1881	1884	Nevada and California Railroad	
Nevada Southern Railway		ATSF	1892	1895	California Eastern Railway	
Newport Wharf and Lumber Company		SP	1889	1893	Santa Ana and Newport Railway	
North Coast Railroad	NCRR		1992	1996	Northwestern Pacific Railroad	
North Pacific Coast Railroad		NWP (SP)	1871	1902	North Shore Railroad	
North Pacific Coast Railroad Extension Company		NWP (SP)	1882	1885	North Pacific Coast Railroad	
North Shore Railroad		NWP (SP)	1902	1907	Northwestern Pacific Railroad	
North Western Railroad of California		NWP (SP)	1885	1892	North Pacific Coast Railroad	
Northern Railway		SP	1871	1898	Southern Pacific Railroad	
Northern California Railroad		SP	1884	1889	Northern California Railway	
Northern California Railway		SP	1888	1898	Southern Pacific Railroad	
Northwestern Pacific Railroad	NWP		1996	2001	Northwestern Pacific Railway	
Northwestern Pacific Railroad	NWP	NWP	1907	1992	Southern Pacific Transportation Company	
Northwestern Pacific Railway	NWP		2001	2001	Northwestern Pacific Railroad	
Northwestern Pacific Railway		NWP	1906	1907	Northwestern Pacific Railroad	
Oakdale Western Railway		ATSF	1904	1911	California, Arizona and Santa Fe Railway	
Oakland and East Side Railroad		ATSF	1902	1911	California, Arizona and Santa Fe Railway	
Oakland Terminal Railroad		ATSF/ WP	1935	1943	Oakland Terminal Railway	
Oakland Township Railroad		SP	1881	1887	South Pacific Coast Railway	
Ocean Shore Railroad			1911	1920	N/A	
Ocean Shore Railway			1905	1911	Ocean Shore Railroad	
Oregon Eastern Railway		SP	1911	1912	Central Pacific Railway	
Oregon and Eureka Railroad			1903	1911	N/A	Leased the Eureka and Klamath River Railroad and Humboldt Railroad
Ostrich Farm Railway			1886	1888	Los Angeles and Pacific Railway	
Otay Railway		SP	1887	1888	National City and Otay Railway	
Outer Harbor Terminal Railway			1927	1955	N/A	
Pacific Coast Railroad			1882	1882	Pacific Coast Railway	
Pacific Coast Railway			1882	1941	N/A	All PCRY right of way in Santa Maria Valley absorbed by competitor Santa Maria Valley Railroad
Pacific Electric Railway	PE	SP	1901	1965	Southern Pacific Company	Electric until 1961
Pacific Improvement Company		SP	1879	1880	Southern Pacific Company	
Pacific Southwestern Railroad		SP	1922	1924	Southern Pacific Company	
Pajaro and Santa Cruz Railroad		SP	1884	1888	Southern Pacific Railroad	
Pajaro Valley Railroad			1890	1897	Pajaro Valley Consolidated Railroad	
Pajaro Valley Consolidated Railroad			1897	1928	N/A	
Pajaro Extension Railway			1897	1897	Pajaro Valley Consolidated Railroad	
Palmdale Railroad			1888	1893	N/A	
Park and Ocean Railroad			1883	1893	Market Street Railway	Steam dummy line. Electrified in 1900, becoming part of the 7 Haight streetcar line.
Parr Terminal Railroad	PRT		1950	2002	Richmond Pacific Railroad	
Pasadena Railway		UP	1887	1892	Los Angeles Terminal Railway	
Patterson and Western Railroad			1915	1921	N/A	
Peninsular Rairoad		SP	1905	1909	Peninsular Railway	
Peninsular Railway		SP	1909	1934	Southern Pacific Company	
Petaluma and Haystack Railroad		NWP (SP)	1862	1875	San Francisco and North Pacific Railroad	
Petaluma and Santa Rosa Railroad			1918	1985		
Petaluma and Santa Rosa Railway			1903	1918		
Placerville and Lake Tahoe Railway			1904	1911	Camino, Placerville and Lake Tahoe Railroad	
Placerville and Sacramento Valley Railroad		SP	1862	1869	Sacramento and Placerville Railroad	
Port Railroads, Inc.	PRI		1973	1996	San Joaquin Valley Railroad	
Porterville Northeastern Railway		SP	1910	1934	Southern Pacific Company	
Quincy and Eastern Railroad			1908	1909	Quincy Western Railway	
Quincy Western Railway			1909	1917	Quincy Railroad	
Ramona and San Bernardino Railroad		SP	1888	1888	Southern Pacific Railroad	
Randsburg Railway		ATSF	1897	1911	California, Arizona and Santa Fe Railway	
Redondo Beach Railway		ATSF	1888	1889	Southern California Railway	
Richmond Belt Railway		ATSF / SP	1902	1932	Atchison, Topeka and Santa Fe Railway, Southern Pacific Company	
Riverside, Rialto and Pacific Railroad		UP	1915	1917	Los Angeles and Salt Lake Railroad	
Riverside, Santa Ana and Los Angeles Railway		ATSF	1885	1887	California Central Railway	
Sacramento Northern Railway	SN	WP	1921	1987	Western Pacific Railroad	Electric until 1946
Sacramento and Oakland Railway		WP	1903	1903	Western Pacific Railway	
Sacramento, Placer and Nevada Railroad			1861	1864	Central Pacific Railway	
Sacramento and Placerville Railroad		SP	1877	1888	Northern Railway	
Sacramento and San Francisco Railroad		SP	1864	1865	California Pacific Railroad	
Sacramento Southern Railroad		SP	1903	1912	Central Pacific Railway	
Sacramento Valley Railroad		SP	1852	1877	Sacramento and Placerville Railroad	
Sacramento Valley and Eastern Railway			1906	1927	N/A	
San Bernardino, Arrowhead and Waterman Railway			1888	1904	Pacific Electric Railway	Became the Arrowhead Line and Highland Line of the Pacific Electric system
San Bernardino and Eastern Railway		ATSF	1890	1892	Southern California Railway	
San Bernardino and Los Angeles Railway		ATSF	1886	1887	California Central Railway	
San Bernardino and Redlands Railroad		SP	1888	1916	Southern Pacific Railroad	
San Bernardino and San Diego Railway		ATSF	1886	1887	California Central Railway	
San Bernardino Valley Railway		ATSF	1887	1887	California Central Railway	
San Diego and Arizona Railway		SP	1906	1933	San Diego and Arizona Eastern Railway	
San Diego and Arizona Eastern Railway	SDAE	SP	1931	1976		Still exists as a lessor of the Carrizo Gorge Railway and San Diego and Imperial Valley Railroad
San Diego and Arizona Eastern Transportation Company	SDAE		1979	1984	San Diego and Imperial Valley Railroad	
San Diego Central Railroad		ATSF	1886	1887	California Central Railway	
San Diego and Cuyamaca Railway		SP	1909	1912	San Diego and South Eastern Railway	
San Diego and Cuyamaca Railway		SP	1887	1888	San Diego, Cuyamaca and Eastern Railway	
San Diego, Cuyamaca and Eastern Railway		SP	1888	1909	San Diego and Cuyamaca Railway	
San Diego, Old Town and Pacific Beach Railroad			1888	1894	Los Angeles and San Diego Beach Railway	
San Diego and Pacific Beach Railway			1887	1888	San Diego, Old Town and Pacific Beach Railroad	
San Diego, Pacific Beach and La Jolla Railway			1894	1906	Los Angeles and San Diego Beach Railway	
San Diego and Old Town Street Railway			1886	1888	San Diego, Old Town and Pacific Beach Railroad	
San Diego and South Eastern Railway		SP	1912	1917	San Diego and Arizona Railway	
San Diego Southern Railway		SP	1908	1912	San Diego and South Eastern Railway	
San Francisco and Alameda Railroad		SP	1863	1870	San Francisco, Oakland and Alameda Railroad	
San Francisco, Alameda and Stockton Railroad		SP	1863	1864	San Francisco and Alameda Railroad	
San Francisco Bay Railroad		SP	1868	1869	Western Pacific Railroad	
San Francisco Belt Railroad	SFB		1969	1993	N/A	
San Francisco and Colorado River Railroad		SP	1883	1887	South Pacific Coast Railway	
San Francisco and Eureka Railway		NWP (SP)	1903	1907	Northwestern Pacific Railroad	
San Francisco and Humboldt Bay Railroad		NWP (SP)	1868	1869	San Francisco and North Pacific Railroad	
San Francisco Market Street Railroad			1860	1867		Steam dummy line.
San Francisco and Marysville Railroad		SP	1857	1865	California Pacific Railroad	
San Francisco and Napa Railway		SP	1903	1911	Southern Pacific Railroad	
San Francisco, Napa and Calistoga Railway	SFN&C		1911	1935	San Francisco and Napa Valley Railroad	
San Francisco and Napa Valley Railroad			1935	1956		
San Francisco and North Pacific Railroad		NWP (SP)	1869	1889	San Francisco and North Pacific Railway	
San Francisco and North Pacific Railway		NWP (SP)	1888	1907	Northwestern Pacific Railroad	
San Francisco and Northwestern Railway		NWP (ATSF)	1903	1907	Northwestern Pacific Railroad	
San Francisco and Oakland Railroad		SP	1861	1870	San Francisco, Oakland and Alameda Railroad	
San Francisco, Oakland and Alameda Railroad		SP	1870	1870	Central Pacific Railroad	
San Francisco and San Joaquin Valley Railway		ATSF	1895	1901	Atchison, Topeka and Santa Fe Railway	
San Francisco and San Jose Railroad		SP	1860	1870	Southern Pacific Railroad	
San Francisco and San Rafael Railroad		NWP (SP)	1882	1889	San Francisco and North Pacific Railway	
San Francisco, Tamalpais and Bolinas Railway		NWP (SP)	1889	1892	North Pacific Coast Railroad	
San Francisco Terminal Railway and Ferry Company		WP	1902	1903	Western Pacific Railway	
San Francisco, Vallejo and Napa Valley Railroad	SFV&NVRR		1906	1911	San Francisco, Napa and Calistoga Railway	
San Gabriel Valley Rapid Transit Railway		SP	1887	1894	Southern Pacific Railroad	
San Jacinto Valley Railway		ATSF	1887	1887	California Central Railway	
San Joaquin and Eastern Railroad	SJ&E		1912	1933	N/A	
San Joaquin and Sierra Nevada Railroad		SP	1882	1888	Northern Railway	
San Joaquin Valley Railroad (1891–1893)		SP	1891	1893	Southern Pacific Railroad	
San Joaquin Valley Railroad (1868–1870)		SP	1868	1870	Central Pacific Railroad	
San Joaquin Valley and Yosemite Railroad		SP	1886	1888	Southern Pacific Railroad	
San Jose and Almaden Railroad		SP	1886	1888	Southern Pacific Railroad	
San Juan Pacific Railway			1907	1912	California Central Railroad	
San Luis Obispo Railroad			1873	1875	San Luis Obispo and Santa Maria Valley Railroad	
San Luis Obispo and Santa Maria Valley Railroad			1875	1882	Pacific Coast Railway	
San Pablo and Tulare Railroad		SP	1871	1888	Southern Pacific Railroad	
San Pablo and Tulare Extension Railroad		SP	1887	1888	Southern Pacific Railroad	
San Pedro, Los Angeles and Salt Lake Railroad	SLR	UP	1901	1916	Los Angeles and Salt Lake Railroad	
San Pedro, Los Angeles and Utah Railway		UP	1887	1887	Pasadena Railway	
San Rafael and San Quentin Railroad		NWP (SP)	1869			
San Ramon Valley Railroad		SP	1888	1888	Southern Pacific Railroad	
Santa Ana Railroad		SP	1889	1892	Newport Wharf and Lumber Company	
Santa Ana and Newport Railway		SP	1892	1899	Southern Pacific Railroad	
Santa Ana and Westminster Railway		SP	1890	1899	Santa Ana and Newport Railway	
Santa Clara and Pajaro Valley Railroad		SP	1868	1870	Southern Pacific Railroad	
Santa Cruz Railroad		SP	1873	1881	Pajaro and Santa Cruz Railroad	
Santa Cruz and Felton Railroad		SP	1874	1887	South Pacific Coast Railway	
Santa Fe and Los Angeles Harbor Railway		ATSF	1922	1942	Atchison, Topeka and Santa Fe Railway	
Santa Fe Pacific Railroad		ATSF	1897	1902	Atchison, Topeka and Santa Fe Railway	
Santa Fe and Santa Monica Railway		ATSF	1892	1892	Southern California Railway	
Santa Fe Terminal Company of California		ATSF	1899	1912	Atchison, Topeka and Santa Fe Railway	
Santa Rosa and Carquinez Railroad		SP	1887	1888		
Saratoga and Almaden Railroad			1884	1905	N/A	
Shingle Springs and Placerville Railroad		SP	1887	1888	Northern Railway	
Sierra Railroad	SERA		1935	2003	Sierra Northern Railway	
Sierra Railway of California	SRYC		1897	1937	Sierra Railroad	
Sierra and Mohawk Railway		SP	1911	1915	Nevada–California–Oregon Railway	
Sierra Valley & Mohawk Railway		SP	1885	1895	Sierra Valley Railroad	
Sierra Valley Railroad		SP	1895	1909	Sierra and Mohawk Railway	
Sonoma County Railroad		NWP (SP)	1868	1868	San Francisco and Humboldt Bay Railroad	
Sonoma and Marin Railroad		NWP (SP)	1875	1877	San Francisco and North Pacific Railroad	
Sonoma and Santa Rosa Railroad		NWP (SP)	1881	1885	Sonoma Valley Railroad	
Sonoma Valley Railroad		NWP (SP)	1878	1889	San Francisco and North Pacific Railway	
Sonoma Valley Prismoidal Railway		NWP (SP)	1875	1878	Sonoma Valley Railroad	
South Pacific Coast Railroad		SP	1876	1887	South Pacific Coast Railway	
South Pacific Coast Railway		SP	1887	1937	Southern Pacific Company	
South San Francisco Belt Railway		SP	1907	1945	Southern Pacific Company	
Southern California Railway		ATSF	1889	1906	Atchison, Topeka and Santa Fe Railway	
Southern California Motor Road		SP	1887	1895	Southern Pacific Railroad	
Southern Pacific Company	SP	SP	1885	1969	Southern Pacific Transportation Company	
Southern Pacific Railroad		SP	1865	1955	Southern Pacific Company	
Southern Pacific Railroad Extension Company		SP	1888	1888	Southern Pacific Railroad	
Southern Pacific Branch Railroad		SP	1872	1873	Southern Pacific Railroad	Part of the Coast Line
Southern Pacific Branch Railway		SP	1886	1888	Southern Pacific Railroad	Part of the Coast Line
Southern Pacific Transportation Company	SP	SP	1969	1998	Union Pacific Railroad	
State Belt Railroad			1873	1969	San Francisco Belt Railroad	
Stockton and Beckwith Pass Railway		WP	1902	1903	Western Pacific Railway	
Stockton and Copperopolis Railroad		SP	1865	1888	Southern Pacific Railroad	
Stockton and Ione Railroad			1873	1875	N/A	
Stockton and Tulare Railroad		SP	1887	1888	Southern Pacific Railroad	
Stockton and Visalia Railroad		SP	1869	1877	Stockton and Copperopolis Railroad	
Sugar Pine Lumber Company			1923	1933	N/A	
Sugar Pine Railway			1903	1922	N/A	
Sunset Railroad		ATSF/ SP	1900	1912	Sunset Railway	
Sunset Railway	SUN	ATSF/ SP	1912			Still exists as a joint subsidiary of the BNSF Railway and Union Pacific Railroad, leased to the San Joaquin Valley Railroad
Sunset Western Railway		ATSF/ SP	1909	1912	Sunset Railway	
Tidewater and Southern Railroad		WP	1910	1912	Tidewater Southern Railway	
Tidewater Southern Railway	TSO, TS	WP	1912	1987	Western Pacific Railroad	
Tidewater and Southern Transit Company		WP	1912	1912	Tidewater Southern Railway	
Tonopah and Tidewater Railroad			1904	1940	N/A	
Vaca Valley Railroad		SP	1869	1870	Vaca Valley and Clear Lake Railroad	
Vaca Valley and Clear Lake Railroad		SP	1877	1888	Northern Railway	
Vallejo, Benicia and Napa Valley Railroad	VB&NVRR		1902	1910	San Francisco, Vallejo and Napa Valley Railroad	
Ventura County Railway	VCY		1911			Still exists as a lessor of the Ventura County Railroad
Ventura and Ojai Valley Railroad		SP	1896	1899	Southern Pacific Railroad	
Visalia Railroad		SP	1874	1899	Southern Pacific Railroad	
Visalia Electric Railroad	VE	SP	1904	1992	Southern Pacific Transportation Company	Electric until 1944
Visalia and Tulare Railroad			1887	1900	N/A	
West Side and Mendocino Railroad		SP	1886	1888	Northern Railway	
Western Nevada Railroad		SP	1879	1880	Nevada and Oregon Railroad	
Western Pacific Railroad	WP	WP	1916	1987	Union Pacific Railroad	
Western Pacific Railroad		SP	1862	1870	Central Pacific Railroad	
Western Pacific Railway		WP	1903	1916	Western Pacific Railroad	
Wilmington and Long Beach Rapid Transit Railroad		SP	1882	1887		
Winters and Ukiah Railway		SP	1887	1888	Northern Railway	
Woodland, Capay and Clear Lake Railroad		SP	1887	1888	Northern Railway	
Yolo Shortline Railroad	YSLR		1991	2003	Sierra Northern Railway	
Yosemite Short Line Railway			1905	1917	N/A	
Yosemite Valley Railroad			1902	1935	Yosemite Valley Railway	
Yosemite Valley Railway			1934	1945	N/A	
Yreka Railroad			1888	1935	Yreka Western Railroad	
Yuba Railroad		SP	1862	1869	California and Oregon Railroad	

=== Private carriers ===
- Albion Lumber Company
- Almanor Railroad Company
- American River Land and Lumber Company
- Bayside Logging Railroad
- Bear Harbor and Eel River Railroad
- Birch and Smart Railroad
- Brookings Lumber and Box Company
- Butte and Plumas Railway
- C.D. Danaher Pine Company
- California Door Company
- California Redwood Company
- Camino, Cable and Northern Railroad
- Carson and Tahoe Lumber and Fluming Company
- Caspar, South Fork and Eastern Railroad
- Charles W. Kitts
- Clover Valley Lumber Company
- Crane Creek Lumber Company
- Crescent City and Smith River Railroad
- C.D. Dansher Pine Company
- R.E. Dansher Company
- Del Norte Southern Railroad
- Descanso, Alpine and Pacific Railway
- Diamond Match Company
- Duncan Mill Land and Lumber Company
- El Dorado Lumber Company
- Elk Creek Railroad
- Epsom Salts Railroad
- Feather River Pine Mills, Inc.
- Fruit Growers Supply Company
- Georgia-Pacific
- Glen Blair Redwood Company
- Glendale Railroad
- Goodyear Redwood Lumber Company
- Grande Ronde Pine Company
- Gualala River Railroad
- Gualala River Railway
- Hammond and Little River Redwood Company
- Hammond Lumber Company
- Hammond Redwood Lumber Company
- Hardy Creek and Eel River Railroad
- Hobart Southern Railroad
- Humboldt Bay and Trinidad Logging and Lumbering Company
- Humboldt Logging Railway
- Humboldt Lumber Mill Company
- Humboldt and Mad River Railroad
- Humboldt Northern Railway
- Hutchison Lumber Company
- United States Gypsum Company
- Kaiser Steel (Eagle Mountain Railroad)
- L.E. White Lumber Company (Greenwood Railroad)
- Lake Valley Railroad
- Little River Redwood Company
- Long-Bell Lumber Company
- Madera Flume and Trading Company
- Madera Sugar Pine Company
- Mammoth Copper Mining Company
- Marsh Lumber Company
- McCloud Railway
- Mendocino Railroad Company
- Metropolitan Redwood Lumber Company
- Michigan–California Lumber Company
- Minors Railroad
- Mono Lake Lumber Company
- Mono Lake Railway and Lumber Company
- Navarro Railroad
- Navarro Mill Company
- Navarro River Railroad
- Northern Redwood Lumber Company
- Outer Harbor Dock and Wharf Company
- Pacific Coast Borax Company (Borate and Daggett Railroad)
- Pacific Lumber Company
- Pacific Lumber and Wood Company
- Pacific Portland Cement Company
- Parr-Richmond Industrial Corporation
- PeopleMover
- Pittsburg Railroad
- Pudding Creek Lumber COmpany
- R.E. Danaher Company
- Rainbow Mill and Lumber Company
- Raymond Granite Company
- Read Timber and Lumber Company
- Red River Lumber Company
- Red Rock Railroad
- Richardson Brothers Railroad
- Rockport Redwood Company
- Salmon Creek Railroad
- Schaffer Mill Railroad
- Selby Smelting and Lead Company
- Shaver Lake Lumber Company (Shaver Lake Railroad)
- Sierra Lumber Company
- Sierra Nevada Wood and Lumber Company
- Siskiyou Electric Light and Power Company
- Sonoma Magnesite Tramway
- South San Francisco Land and Improvement Company
- Southwestern Portland Cement Company
- Stearns Lumber Company
- Stone Canyon Pacific Railway
- Tecopa Railroad
- Ten Mile Railroad
- Terry Lumber Company (Anderson and Bella Vista Railroad)
- Towle Brothers Company
- Trinidad Milling Company
- Truckee Lumber COmpany
- Tulare Valley Railroad
- Union Lumber Company (Fort Bragg Railroad)
- Union Sugar Company
- Usal Redwood Company
- Verdi Lumber Company
- Viewliner Train of Tomorrow
- Waterloo Mining Railroad
- Watsonville Traction Company
- Weed Lumber Company
- West Side Flume and Lumber Company
- West Side Lumber Company railway
- Western Meat Company
- Western Plant Services, Inc.
- Western Redwood Lumber Company
- Wood Sheldon Lumber Company
- Yellow Aster Mining Company
- Yosemite Lumber Company
- Yosemite Sugar Pine Lumber Company

=== Excursion ===
- Port of Los Angeles Waterfront Red Car Line

== See also ==
- History of rail transportation in California
- List of San Francisco Bay Area trains
