= Mono Mills =

Mono Mills may refer to:

- Mono Mills, Ontario, Canada
- Mono Mills, California, United States
