= Iron Mountain Railroad =

Iron Mountain Railroad could refer to:

- Iron Mountain Railroad (Michigan), 1855–1859, predecessor of the Duluth, South Shore and Atlantic Railway
  - Iron Mountain Railway (Michigan), 1855–1857, predecessor of the above
- St. Louis, Iron Mountain and Southern Railway, which was known informally as the "Iron Mountain Railway"
- Iron Mountain Railway (California) Mining railroad located northwest of Redding, CA
