= CCLC =

CCLC may refer to:

- 21st Century Community Learning Center, or 21stCCLC, US after-school program
- CCLC, formerly the Chevy Chase Land Company
- Civil Code of Lower Canada, 1866 legal document
- Coram Children's Legal Centre, UK charity
- Crane Creek Lumber Company, former US railroad
