= RPRC =

RPRC may refer to:

- The Patriotic Rally for the Renewal of the Central African Republic, a rebel group in the Central African Republic (commonly known in English by its French-language abbreviation)
- The Richmond Pacific Railroad, a short commercial railroad in the United States
