= Sacramento Valley and Eastern Railway =

Overview
- Locale: Shasta County, California
- Dates of operation: 1908–1930s

Technical
- Track gauge: 4 ft 8 1/2 in (1,435 mm) standard gauge
- Length: 15 mi (24 km)

The Sacramento Valley and Eastern Railway (SV&E) was a railway company that operated in Shasta County, California from 1908 until the early 1930s.

== History ==
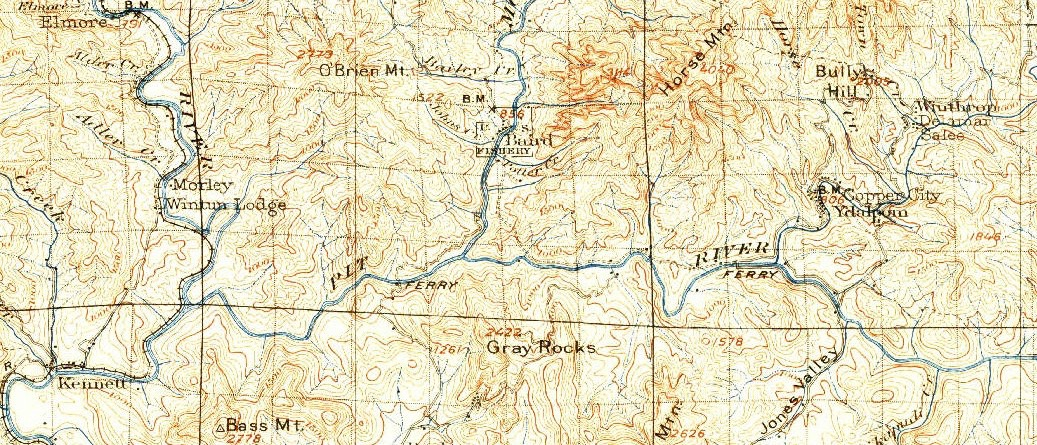
Area around Bully Hill and Pitt River in 1901

From 1908 until the early 1930s, the town of Pitt (now under Shasta Lake) was the terminus for the standard gauge Sacramento Valley and Eastern Railway, which extended from the Southern Pacific 15 miles (24 km) up the Pitt River northeast to the town of Delmar. Although stated to be a common carrier, the SV&E was solely dependent on the success of the mine and smelter at Bully Hill, about 1.5 miles (2.4 km) above the railroad’s easternmost terminus. The decline in copper prices and lack of revenue led to the closure of the railroad.

=== DeLamar Railroad ===
The Bully Hill and Squaw Creek areas of Shasta County had been worked for gold in the 1850s and 1860s and quartz in the 1880s, the more precious of the region's mineral resources. In July 1899, a colorful New York financier, Captain Joseph Raphael De Lamar, purchased the Bully Hill mines for about $200,000 and set about building a smelter of 400 ton capacity and developing the area for copper. A 30" gauge railroad (1.5 miles long) was used to connect level 3 of the mine with the smelter, using a diminutive Shay locomotive bought new for the project, which became informally known as the DeLamar Railroad. The smelting plant began operation in 1901.

In 1901 DeLamar built an electrolytic refinery in Chrome, New Jersey to handle the product of the Bully Hill smelter in the form of flat ingots of blister copper. This was the first operation in the Bully Hill area that met with any kind of success. However a major setback was the lack of good transportation. Freight was hauled in and out by wagons on crude dirt roads over Bear Mountain Summit, 13 miles (21 km) to the railhead of the Anderson and Bella Vista Railroad at Bella Vista.

=== Construction and opening ===
Copper Prices were rising and the property looked attractive enough to the General Electric Company of New York, who purchased it in 1905 and continued to operate the smelter at capacity. To alleviate the transportation problem, General Electric commenced grading in 1907 for the Sacramento Valley and Eastern Railway. Sometime in 1908, the 15.5-mile (24.9 km) railroad was opened to the public and, to recover some of the initial investment in its construction, full freight and passenger service was offered. A new 2-6-2T tank engine was ordered from Baldwin Locomotive Works in Pennsylvania that same year, although a leased SP 4-4-0 was used to open the line.

=== Operation ===
The railroad was started quite late in the "copper boom" and the railway's fortunes turned after two years. The open roasting of the ores prior to smelting, necessary because of the high sulfur content, released clouds of smoke and toxic fumes, which had disastrous effects on any plant life that came in contact with it. In July 1910, following the filing of a suit by the U.S. government regarding damage being done to the nearby national forests, the Bully Hill smelter was closed down, never to be reopened by General Electric. The cost of installing mechanical roasters was too costly in light of the now-declining copper prices.

Meanwhile, the SV&E continued providing a service with a "skunk" gasoline motor car being used in later years to carry passengers, mail and express from Pitt out to the SP line. While the smelter business was shaky, there was at least a less-than-carload business of sorts with milk, farm equipment, papers, and hay being handled by the line.

In 1917, Walter Arnstein, president of the Oakland and Antioch Railroad, and owner of the Nevada County Narrow Gauge, secured a long-term lease and the mining of copper and zinc resumed. DeLamar's original 30" gauge railroad was utilized to transfer the ore to DeLamar where it was loaded onto standard gauge cars and shipped via the Sacramento Valley and Eastern and the Southern Pacific to the Mammoth Smelter at Kennet (now under Shasta Lake). Smelting operations were revived at Bully Hill in early 1920, only to be stopped again following declining prices in 1922.

In 1920, Shasta Zinc and Copper Company acquired the mine and smelter area and in 1924, consolidated several mines in the area, including the Afterthought at Ingot, from which an aerial tramway was constructed in 1925 connecting it with the smelter at Bully Hill, about 8 miles (13 km) away. A material known as Shasta zinc oxide was produced, which was an ingredient in paint and rubber tires among other things. The final product was shipped out via SV&E and SP to San Francisco where it was placed on a steamship to be sent to Baltimore.

=== Decline and abandonment ===
Following steady declines in copper and zinc prices in 1927, the Bully Hill operation was shut down once again and the SV&E became idle. The Sacramento Valley & Eastern was not listed in the 1930 Official Guide of the Railways and was abandoned entirely following the collapse of the bridge across the Sacramento River just east of Pitt during the floods of early 1939.

Today no trace of the right of way remains since it was submerged under the waters of Shasta Lake in the early 1940s.
