= Oakland Terminal Railway =

Terminal railroad in California, US

Overview
- Parent company: Union Pacific Railroad; BNSF Railway
- Locale: Oakland, California
- Dates of operation: 1943–
- Predecessor: Key System; Oakland Terminal Railroad
- Successor: West Oakland Pacific Railroad

Technical
- Track gauge: 1,435 mm (4 ft 8 1/2 in) standard gauge
- Track length: 10 mi (16 km)

The Oakland Terminal Railway (reporting mark OTR) was a terminal railroad in West Oakland, California. The OTR was jointly acquired in 1943 by the Western Pacific Railroad and Atchison, Topeka and Santa Fe Railway to take over the Key System's freight railroad known as the Oakland Terminal Railroad. Today, the OTR is now the West Oakland Pacific Railroad (reporting mark WOPR) that operates on 10 miles (16 km) of track. OTR was jointly owned by the Union Pacific Railroad and BNSF Railway. The railroad operated in the industrial area around the Oakland Army Base.

The OTR interchanged with the ATSF near the Southern Pacific 16th Street Station in Oakland. The OTR also interchanged with the Western Pacific via trackage rights over the Key System from Emeryville to the Sacramento Northern (a WP subsidiary) terminal at 40th and Shafter Streets in Oakland. It is no longer in service.

== Oakland Terminal Railroad ==
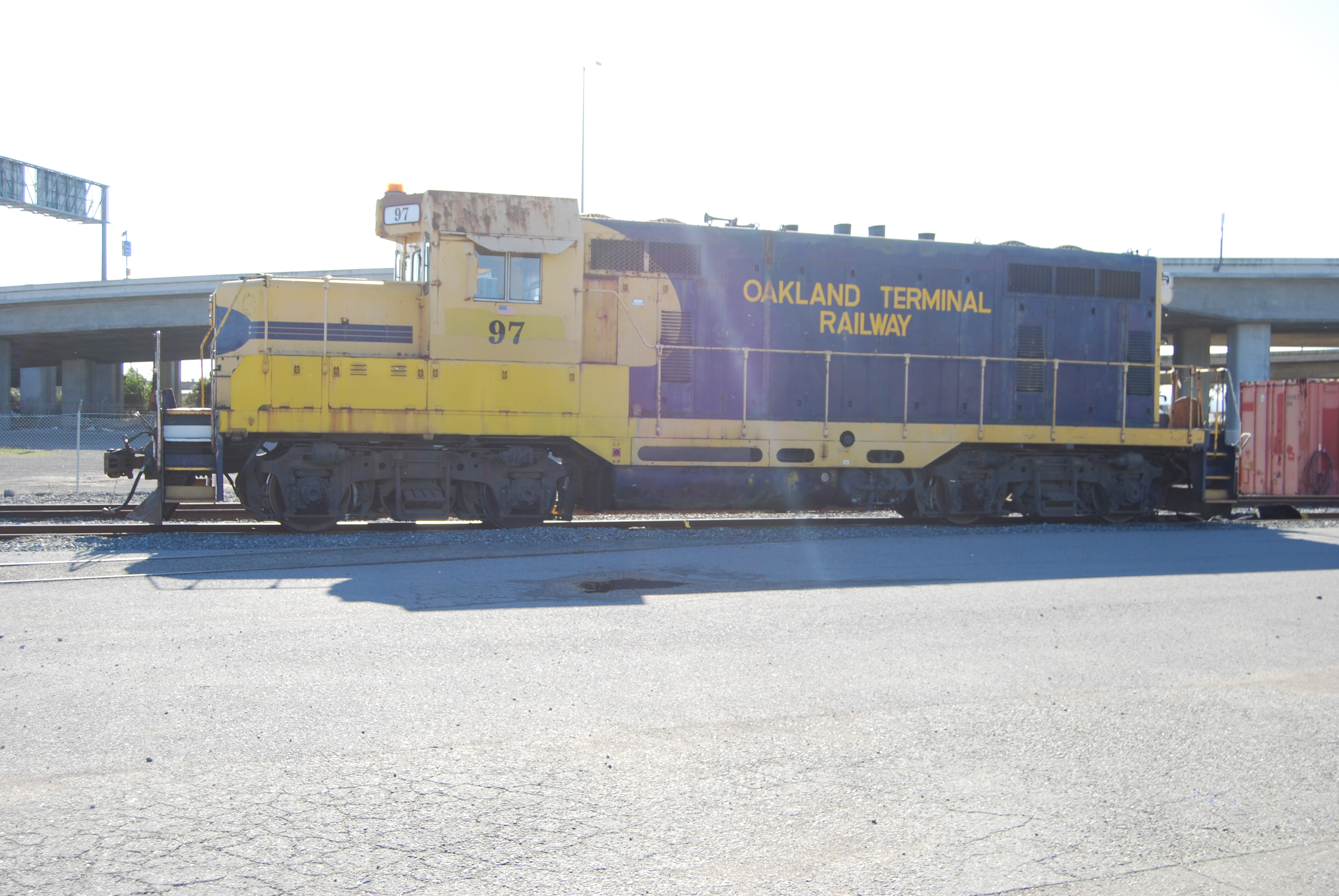
Oakland Terminal Railway 97, the railroad's only locomotive.

The Oakland Terminal Railroad was the predecessor of the Oakland Terminal Railway. The Railroad was formed in 1935 by the Railway Realty & Equipment Company, Ltd. to handle the Key System's freight customers. The Railroad operated over Key System's A, B, and C lines and the Key System's freight-only tracks on 26th Street and along the waterfront. In 1943 the Key System sold the Oakland Terminal Railroad to the Western Pacific and the Santa Fe Railway. The Oakland Terminal Railroad was renamed the Oakland Terminal Railway. Because it operated over some of the Key System, some of the switching was performed by electric locomotives. The company acquired a controversial franchise to operate street running on Union Street in 1953, allowing the freight interchange directly between the two parent companies' lines.

== See also ==
- List of California railroads
