= Modesto and Empire Traction Company =

Class III railroad in Stanislaus County, California

Modesto and Empire Traction

Overview
- Headquarters: Modesto, California
- Reporting mark: MET
- Locale: Modesto–Empire, California
- Dates of operation: 1911–present

Technical
- Track gauge: 1,435 mm (4 ft 8 1/2 in)

Other
- Website: metrr.com

The Modesto and Empire Traction Company (reporting mark MET) is a Class III short-line railroad operating in California's San Joaquin Valley. It is owned by the Beard Land & Investment Company; the Beard family has always owned the railroad. The Beards also created the Beard Industrial Park where the MET's customers are located. The railroad was unique in that it had operated for nearly 50 years exclusively with GE 70-ton switchers built between 1947 and 1955; however, a former Southern Pacific EMD SW1500 switcher was added to the roster as of late. The MET operates on 5 miles (8 km) of mainline track, as well as an additional 48.7 miles (78.4 km) of yard and industry track, providing switching services in the Beard Industrial Park. The MET interchanges with the Union Pacific (ex-Southern Pacific) at Modesto and with the BNSF Railway Stockton Subdivision (ex-Santa Fe) at Empire.

== Traffic ==
The MET handles 24,000 cars per year (1996 estimate).

Products shipped include:

- Food products
- Wine
- Syrup
- Plastic
- Paper products

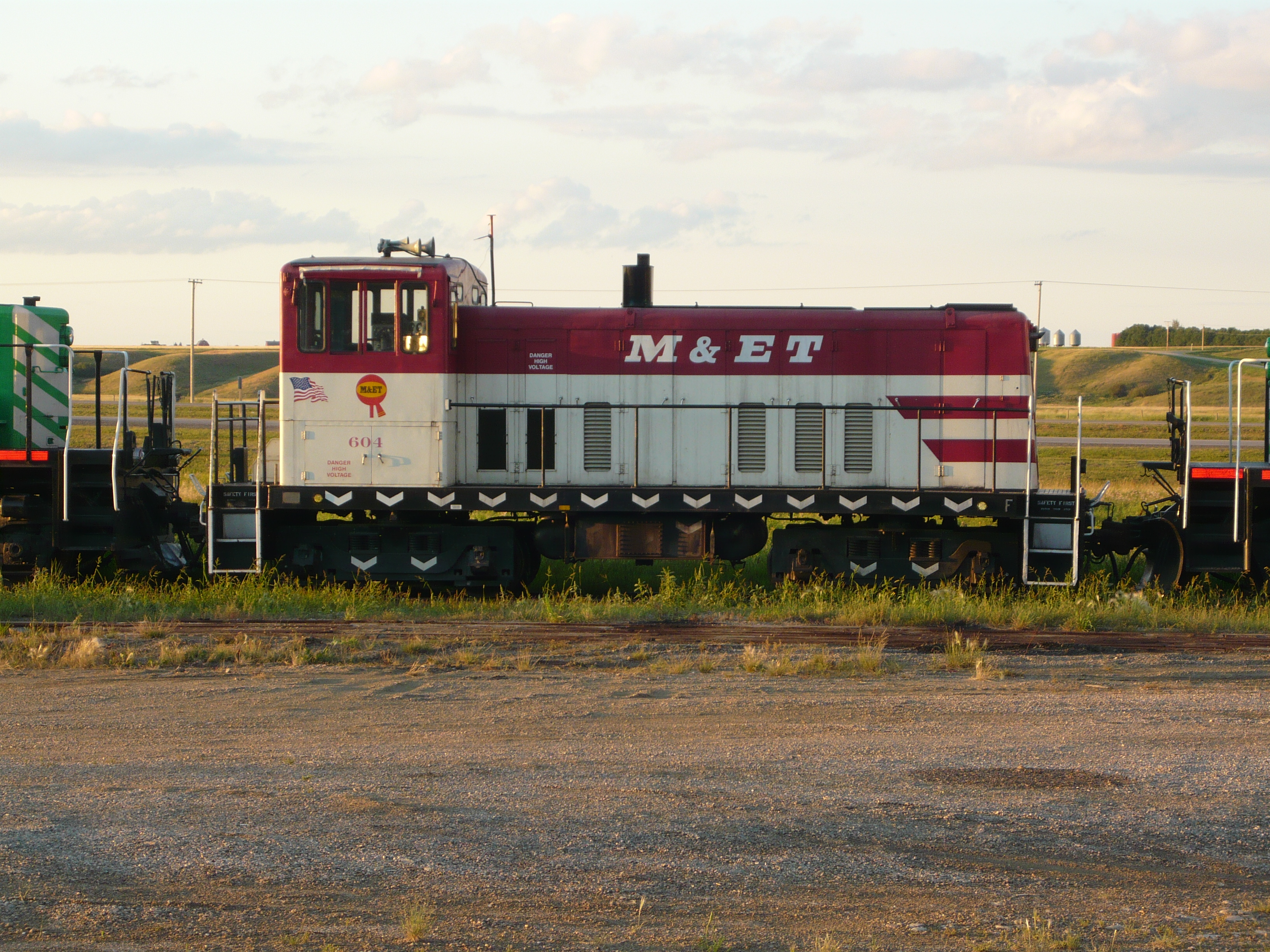
Former locomotive 604, still wearing its MET livery at its new home with the Last Mountain Railway in Saskatchewan, Canada; 2011

== History ==
The MET was incorporated on October 7, 1911, by T. K. Beard. On November 1, 1911, it leased the electrified Modesto Interurban Railway (MIR); passenger services started that day. Traction was initially provided by gasoline-powered locomotives. Passenger services were the primary revenues for the railroad, though they only lasted until 1917, whereupon the company transitioned to freight only. The MET eliminated their electrification system and converted to diesel locomotives in March 1952. (Hilton and Due claim that the railway was never electrified.)

=== Modesto Interurban Railway ===
The Modesto Interurban Railway was incorporated on March 23, 1909, with plans to build 9.5 miles (15.3 km) of track from Modesto along McHenry Avenue and then directly to Riverbank. The railway was envisioned because only the Southern Pacific served Modesto; the Atchison, Topeka and Santa Fe Railway bypassed Modesto by 5 miles (8 km) to the east at Empire. The Modesto Interurban Railway linked the Santa Fe with Modesto. On April 12, 1909, the grading commenced. Just days before the Modesto & Empire Traction began taking over the railroad, the Modesto Interurban Railway completed construction and operated its first train. By November 1, 1911, the Modesto & Empire Traction was leasing the railway. The MIR ceased to exist as a legal entity in 1993 and its assets were merged into the MET.
