= Mojave Northern Railroad =

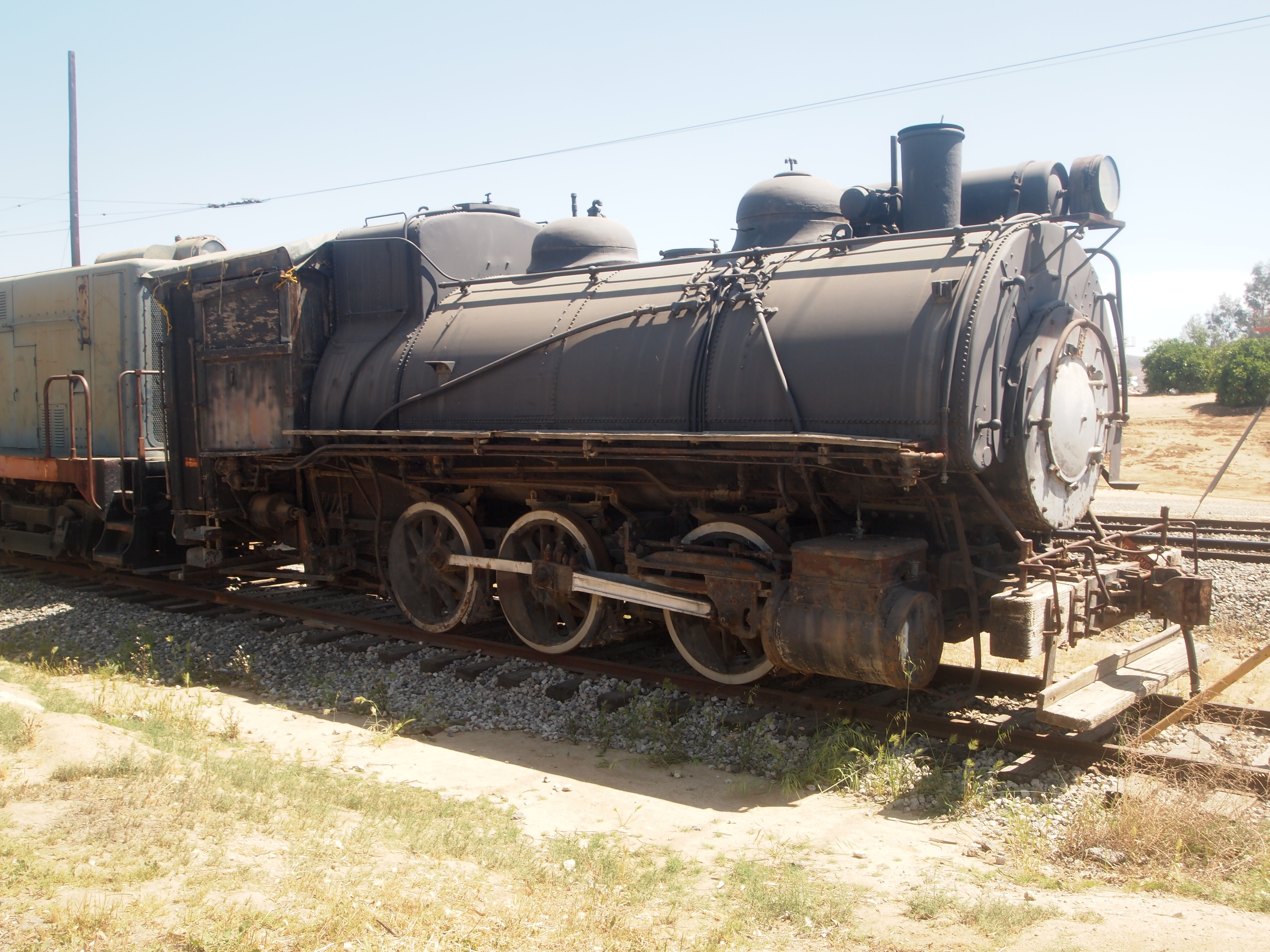
SMojave Northern RR #2 at the Southern California Railway Museum

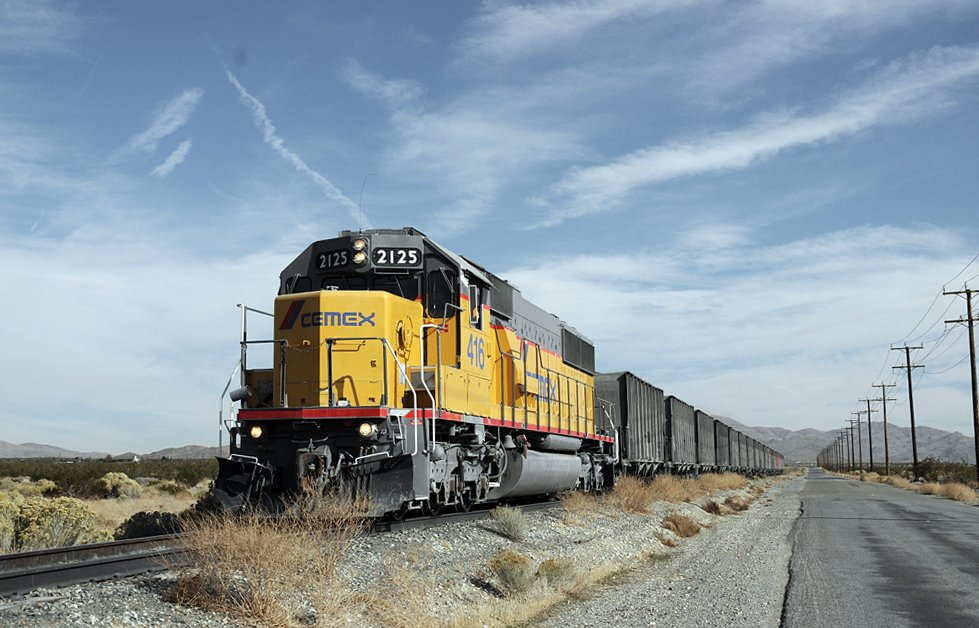
A Mojave Northern train of hoppers on its way to the cement plant at Leon

The Mojave Northern Railroad is a private carrier owned by Cemex USA, an American subsidiary of the Mexican multinational supplier of concrete and building materials. The railroad hauls limestone to the company’s cement plant near Victorville, California from the company’s quarries northeast of there.

The railroad was built in 1915-16, by the Southwestern Portland Cement Company, initially from its cement plant 5.5 miles to its limestone quarry in Sidewinder Valley. The line was extended five miles to Bell in 1947, and seven more miles to Reserve Quarry in 1951. The railroad connects with the Burlington Northern Santa Fe Railway at Leon (probably named for Mojave Northern builder Carl Leonhart). Southwestern Portland Cement Company was absorbed by American subsidiary Cemex USA.

The line was initially a common carrier, but changed its status to that of a private carrier in 1925. For many years, the railroad operated saddle-tank steam engines pulling trains of side-dump cars. One of these engines is on display at the Pacific Southwest Railway Museum, and the other is at the Southern California Railway Museum. In the diesel era, the railroad operated three of the unusual Fairbanks-Morse FM H-20-44 model opposed-piston locomotives. One of these is now at the Illinois Railway Museum and one is at the Pacific Southwest Railway Museum. The railroad now operates conventional diesel engines pulling open-top hopper cars.
