= California, Shasta and Eastern Railway =

Shortline railway in California, U.S.

California, Shasta and Eastern Railway, Inc.
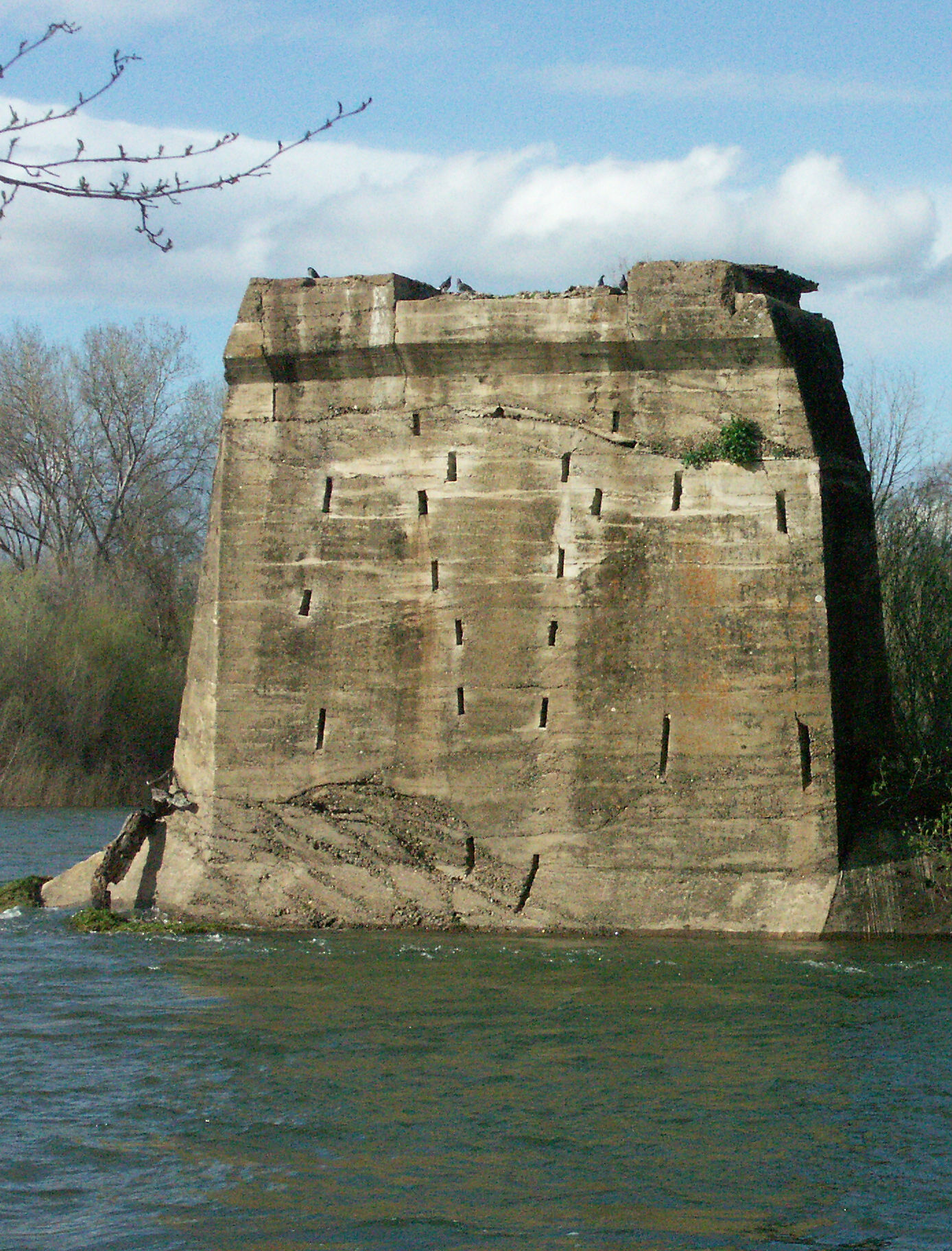
- Ruin of a 1925 Concrete pier on the Sacramento River

History
- Closed: 1937

Technical
- Track gauge: 4 ft 8 1/2 in (1,435 mm)

The California, Shasta and Eastern Railway was a 15 miles (24 km) shortline railroad which operated, for nearly 40 years, between Anderson and Bella Vista, California with no greater aspirations then being a glorified mill spur. Briefly around 1906 however, the road basked in the limelight of the mighty E.H. Harriman who considered, and then discarded, the idea of incorporating it into one of his "paper" railroads projected through the region.

== History ==
=== Timber industry ===
The roots of this operation date back to 1884 when the Morris brothers began construction of a flume from the rich timber belt near Round Mountain about 35 miles (56 km) northeast of Redding on the Little Cow Creek drainage to a point below the snow belt. From here, sawn boards were transported by wagons to the railhead. Ownership passed to Joseph Enright of Chico, who extended the flume (up to 32 miles (51 km)) to a planing mill, drying shed, and box factory he erected where Little Cow Creek and Dry Creek join to form Cow Creek. The community around the operation became known as Bella Vista.

=== Anderson and Bella Vista Railroad ===
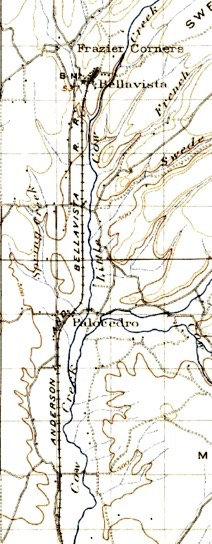
Northern portion of route in 1901

The bottleneck of the operation was the transfer of the lumber from the mill at Bella Vista to the nearest rail connection, which was 10 miles (16 km) away in Redding and on the wrong side of the Sacramento River. Clearly, a standard gauge shortline railroad would need to be constructed. In about 1891, work began on the Anderson & Bella Vista Railroad down the valley of Cow Creek to the Southern Pacific rail connection in Anderson.

==== Construction ====
Little grading was required, the only major obstacle being the crossing of the Sacramento River north of Anderson which was originally done with a ferry. The top heavy arrangement of the ferry proved to be fatal for the railroad's first locomotive, a diminutive 4-4-0 named J.G. Kellog which one day fell into the river never to be recovered. The locomotive is still there; it was discovered again during construction of a new road bridge across the river, next to the old one. Following this incident, the railroad opted to build a trestle instead. There are plans to raise the loco.

==== Sale to J. E. Terry ====
By 1897, Enright had sold all his properties, including the A&BV, to Joseph E. Terry, reportedly for $87,000. The 2-4-0 locomotive (obtained from the Visalia Railroad to replace the J.C. Kellog) was appropriately named J.E. Terry.

==== Traffic ====
From the beginning, the road was never intended as a common carrier or passenger road. The top speed was around 15 miles per hour (24 km/h) and most of the business came from the mills in Bella Vista, although other producers used the line on occasion.

==== Operating equipment in 1906 ====
The operating equipment in 1906 consisted of a single locomotive, a leased Southern Pacific 4-4-0 numbered 1341 which replaced the J.E. Terry following an enginehouse fire in Bella Vista in December 1905. The line also had one boxcar, Oregon Short Line no. 7385 which was used as a caboose, express car, and coach. In addition there were 2 hand cars, 3 light pushers, and 3 center dump gravel cars.

This survey of equipment was part of a comprehensive study for Southern Pacific chief engineer William Hood. It seems that the Anderson and Bella Vista Railroad mainline lay directly in the path of the Goose Lake and Southern Railway, a Harriman contrivance, an arm of which was projected into the area in 1906 on its way from the Goose Lake area, via Alturas, some 227 miles (365 km) to a connection with the SP at Anderson. Nothing was to come of the project however.

=== Incorporation of the California, Shasta and Eastern ===
The California Shasta & Eastern was incorporated June 4, 1913, but did not formally take title to the A&BV until September 4. Evidently, this was a legal dodge by Terry who interested the Afterthought Copper Company in purchasing the line. The purchase was made for $200,000 and a $405,000 extension to Ingot was announced. This never materialized. Following fires in Bella Vista in 1917, Terry disappeared, departing on an SP train in Anderson never to return. The Afterthought Copper Company was experiencing declining revenues with the loss of lumber traffic at Bella Vista and the railroad went idle.

By March 1920, the Red River Lumber Company was in control and pumped men and money into the railroad, laying new ties and rails where needed on the CS&E, as well as improving and restoring logging operations on Round Mountain and rebuilding the mill at Bella Vista. Unfortunately, the industry went into recession by late 1920 and the entire logging operation was shut down. The logging railroad on Round Mountain was pulled up in 1925.

Operations on the railroad became infrequent, although for unknown reasons, the Red River Lumber Company continued to spend money on the line. In 1925, the piers on the original bridge over the Sacramento River were replaced with concrete at a cost of nearly $19,000. Red River made little use of the bridge and it was deeded to the county, along with much of the right of way which became Deschutes Road. The county filled in the deck with concrete until a new bridge was built in 1972. The remaining railroad was torn up in 1937, although official permission to abandon the line was not granted by Interstate Commerce Commission until 1946.

== Locomotives ==
=== A&BV ===
- J.G. Kellog, 4-4-0, lost in a river crossing accident
- J.E. Terry, 2-4-0 (ex-Visalia Railroad), destroyed in an enginehouse fire in Bella Vista in December 1905
- #1341, an "American type" 4-4-0 steam locomotive built by Schenectady Locomotive Works (Builder No. 1457) in 1881 for the Southern Pacific Railroad. On 03/10/1909 the Southern Pacific sold the locomotive to the Anderson & Bella Vista, retaining its original numbering. It had earlier been leased from the Southern Pacific, following the loss of the "J.E. Terry".

=== CS&E ===
- #1341, from the A&BV

The railroad also had various freight cars.

The narrow-gauge logging railroad at Round Mountain had 6 locomotives working on the line, two 2-4-2 tanks, an 0-4-0, an 0-6-0 a Climax, as well a Heisler locomotive acquired from the Nevada Short Line Railway (originating from the Borate and Daggett Railroad) and was named "Francis." When the logging railroad was closed in 1925, it was not reported what happened to the locomotives following the sale of reusable equipment. However it was said that one of the 2-4-2's had derailed far out on the line and could not be recovered until 1951 when it was finally scrapped.

== See also ==
- Palo Cedro, California town which the railroad ran through
