= Crane Creek Lumber Company =

Defunct lumber company in California

Overview
- Headquarters: Willow Ranch, California
- Locale: Modoc County, California
- Dates of operation: 1928–1930 (tracks removed 1934)

Technical
- Track gauge: Standard
- Length: 16.5 miles

The Crane Creek Lumber Company (CCLC) was the first major lumber company to operate in the Modoc National Forest in California. Its business was located at the mouth of the Crane Creek Canyon. In the 1920s, the company moved to Lawson Creek, where it built a railroad spur in 1928. The spur was built as the result of Crane Creek's successful bid to the National Forest Service, in 1926, to produce 194 million board feet of timber in the Modoc National Forest's Fandango Logging Unit. Ponderosa pine was a primary species that was logged. The company built a planing mill and box factory at Willow Creek near the Nevada-California-Oregon Railway (NCO). In the 1930s, a fire destroyed the Lawson Creek operations of the company.

The company also built a standard-gauge logging railroad that operated from a junction with the NCO at Willow Creek, running southeast for 16.5 miles into the Modoc National Forest. The track was constructed in 1928, abandoned in 1930, and removed in 1934. The railroad used an oil-fueled Shay locomotive that hauled two flatcars of lumber. The Shay, numbered #1 (Shay Serial Number 2733) was built by Shay in 1913 for the Crookston Lumber Company. The CCLC bought the locomotive in 1928. The locomotive was sold again in 1947.

== See also ==
- List of defunct California railroads
- Modoc National Forest topics
