= San Joaquin and Sierra Nevada Railroad =

Defunct railroad in California, USA

Overview
- Headquarters: San Francisco, California
- Locale: Lodi, California area
- Dates of operation: 1882; 144 years ago – 1888; 138 years ago

Technical
- Track gauge: 3 ft (914 mm) narrow gauge

The San Joaquin and Sierra Nevada Railroad (or Rail Road) was originally built as a 3 ft (914 mm) narrow gauge that ran from Bracks Landing (10.6 miles west of Woodbridge on the San Joaquin Delta, on the Brack Tract on the east side of South Mokelumne River, between Hog Slough and Terminous) to Woodbridge and Lodi and then east to the Sierra Nevada foothill town of Valley Springs. The railroad was incorporated on March 28, 1882 and construction was completed on April 15, 1885. The railroad was built as a common carrier with the goal of attracting traffic by offering year-round travel to tourists into the mountains (as opposed to summer-only stagecoach service), as well as lower rail freight rates on grain and timber. The track was built using 35/40 lb steel rails.

On March 15, 1888 the San Joaquin & Sierra Nevada was consolidated into Southern Pacific Railroad's (SP) subsidiary, the Northern Railway Company. In 1897, the Northern Railway abandoned the track between Woodbridge and Brack's Landing and converted the rest of the line to 4 ft 8 1/2 in (1,435 mm) standard gauge. The following year, the Northern Railway was consolidated into the Southern Pacific.

In 1925/1926, Southern Pacific extended the branch line 8 miles east into the Sierras to its ending point known as Kentucky House (or Kentucky Home). The last 4 miles of the branch at Kentucky House were sold to the Calaveras Cement Company on April 28, 1929. The Calaveras Cement Company closed the plant at Kentucky House in 1984. Prior to 1984, the SP was operating three freight trains per week between Lodi and Kentucky House. The branch was listed in Southern Pacific timetables as the Kentucky House Branch and interchanged at Lodi with the SP mainline that ran from Stockton - Sacramento. After the cement plant closed, the branch was used to store railroad freight cars. Eventually the tracks were removed.

The line from Woodbridge to Lodi is known as the Woodbridge Branch and terminates near the General Mills plant in Lodi.

== Route ==
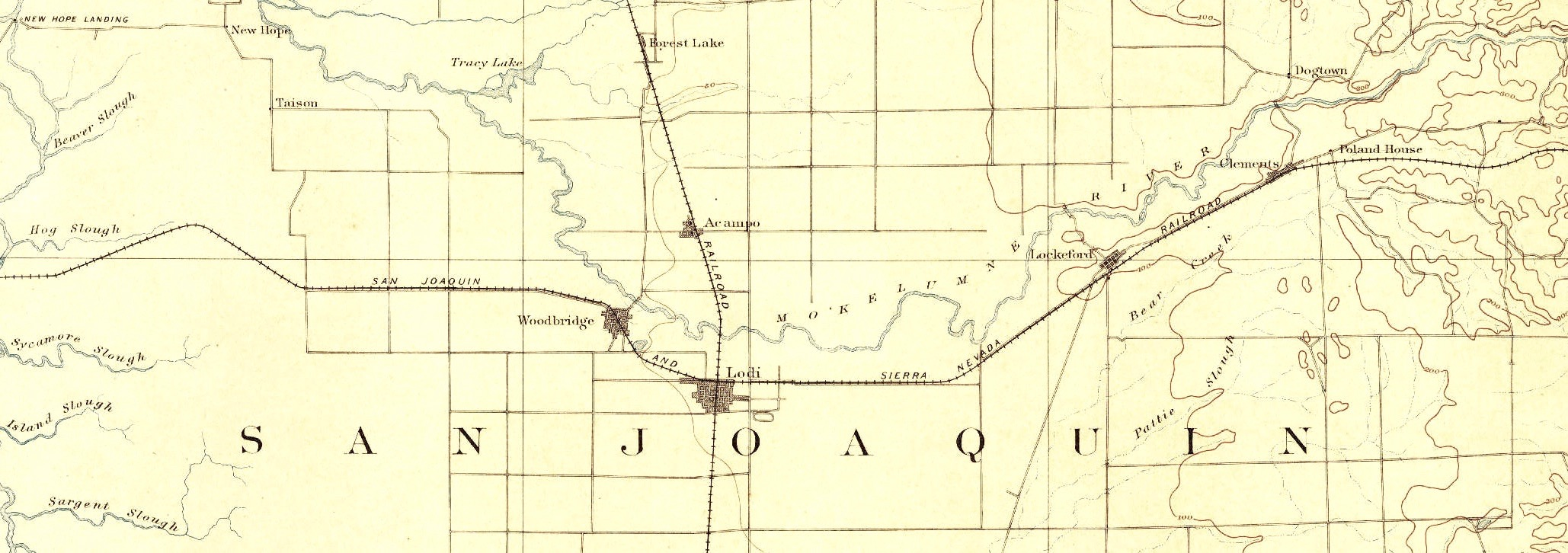
Lodi portion of route

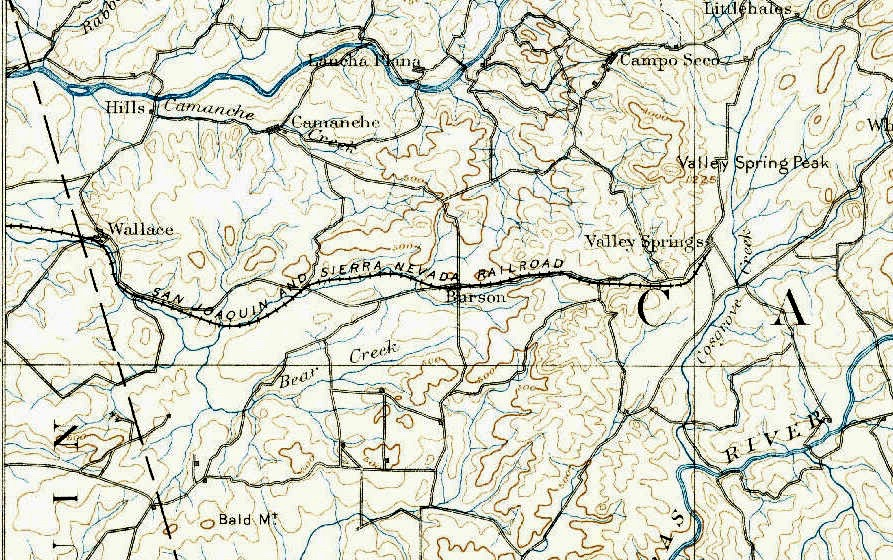
Valley Springs portion of route in 1889

Note: Southern Pacific (MP) were track mile distance from Oakland, California.

- Brack's Landing (SJ&SN 1882–1897) connection with shipping on the California Delta/Mokelumne River located on Brack Tract - Woodbridge Road 5 miles east of Interstate 5.
- Woodbridge (Later SP Woodbridge Branch MP 105.8)
- Lodi (SP MP 103.3) End Woodbridge Branch, begin Kentucky House Branch Depot
- CCT Crossing (SP MP 105.1)
- Roma (SP MP 105.2) Spur
- Victor (SP MP 107.1)
- Lockeford (SP MP 110.7) Depot
- Clements (SP MP 114.7)
- Wallace (SP MP 120.8)
- Helisma (SP MP 126.4)
- Norval (SP MP 129.3)
- Valley Springs (SP MP 130.2) Depot
- Toyon (SP MP 134.7)
- MacNider (SP MP 139.0)
- Kentucky House (SP MP 142.6) Calaveras Cement plant

== Locomotives ==
- SJ&SN engine #1 was named "Ernie Birdsall" and was a narrow gauge 2-4-2T (Columbia type locomotive) built in early 1881 by Baldwin Locomotive Works (Builder Number 6035). It was used in Dayton, Nevada for one year before being brought over to California. Frederick Birdsall was President of the SJ&SN.
- Engine #2 was named "B.F. Langford" and was a narrow gauge Porter (Builder No. 504) 0-6-2 built in July 1882. It was later acquired by SJ&SN's successor, the Northern Railway and renumbered Northern Ry #1024.
- Engine #3 was named "Jacob Brack", possibly after the landowner at the western terminus of the railroad. #3 was built in August 1882 by Porter (Builder No. 510) and was a 0-4-4T (Forney type). It was later acquired by SJ&SN's successor, the Northern Railway and renumbered Northern Ry #1025.
- Engine #4 was built by Baldwin Locomotive Works (Builder No. 5748) in August 1881 and was a narrow gauge 4-4-0 (American Type) that was acquired from the Oregonian Railway. It was later renumbered Northern Railway #1026.
- Engine #5 was built by Pittsburgh Locomotive And Car Works (Builder No. 430) in July 1880 and was a 2-6-0 (Mogul Type). It was renumbered Northern Railway #1027.
