= Mono Mills, California =

Former settlement in California, United States

Mono Mills
- Ghost town
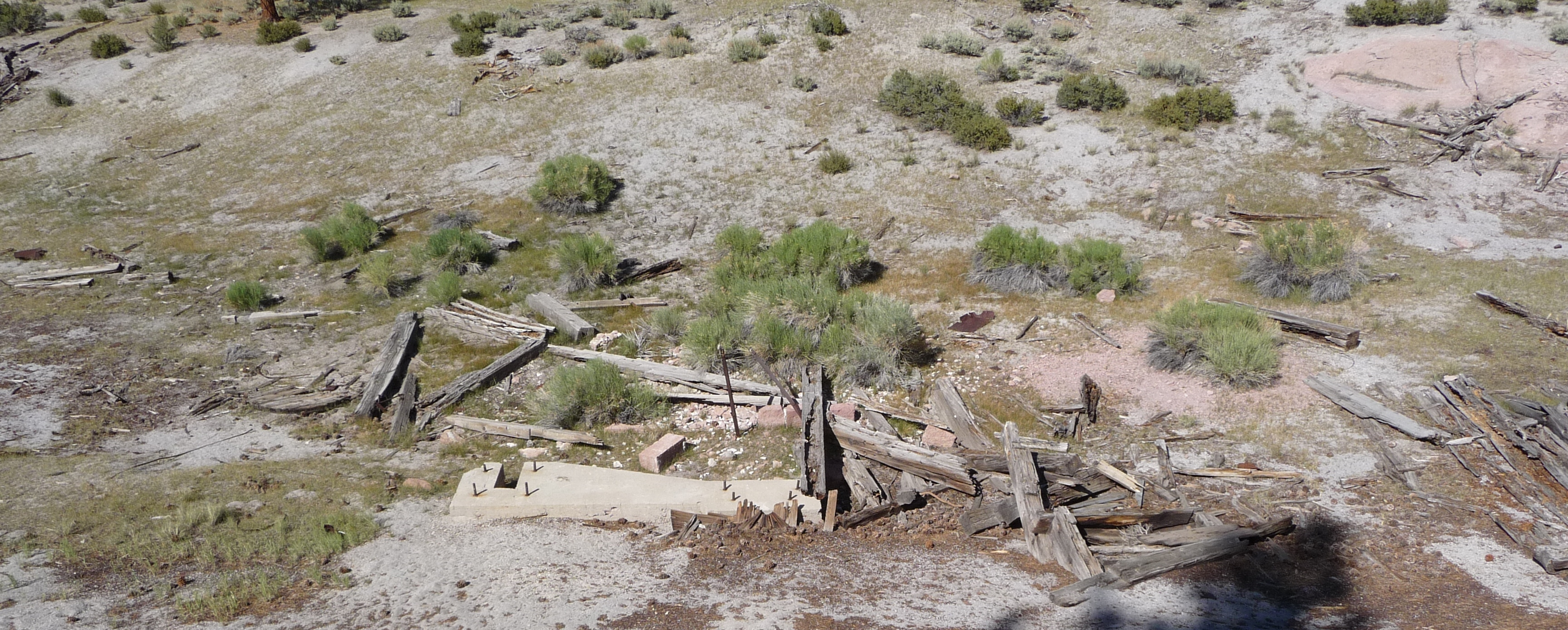
- Mono Mills ruins

- Location in California Mono Mills (the United States)
- Coordinates: 37°53′15″N 118°57′34″W
- Country: United States
- State: California
- County: Mono
- Elevation: 7,356 ft (2,242 m)

Mono Mills (also Mono) is a ghost town in Mono County, California, United States. It is located 9.5 miles (15 km) east-southeast of Lee Vining, at an elevation of 7356 feet (2242 m). Mono Mills has nearly vanished. Its site is along California State Route 120, 9.1 miles (15 km) east from the junction with U.S. Route 395.

== Background ==
Mono Mills started as a lumber camp that supplied Bodie's mines. The first sawmill was built in 1880. In 1881, a narrow-gauge railroad, Bodie & Benton Railway, was built from Mono Mills to Bodie. At its peak, Mono Mills shipped almost 45,000 cords of wood per year.

== Gallery ==
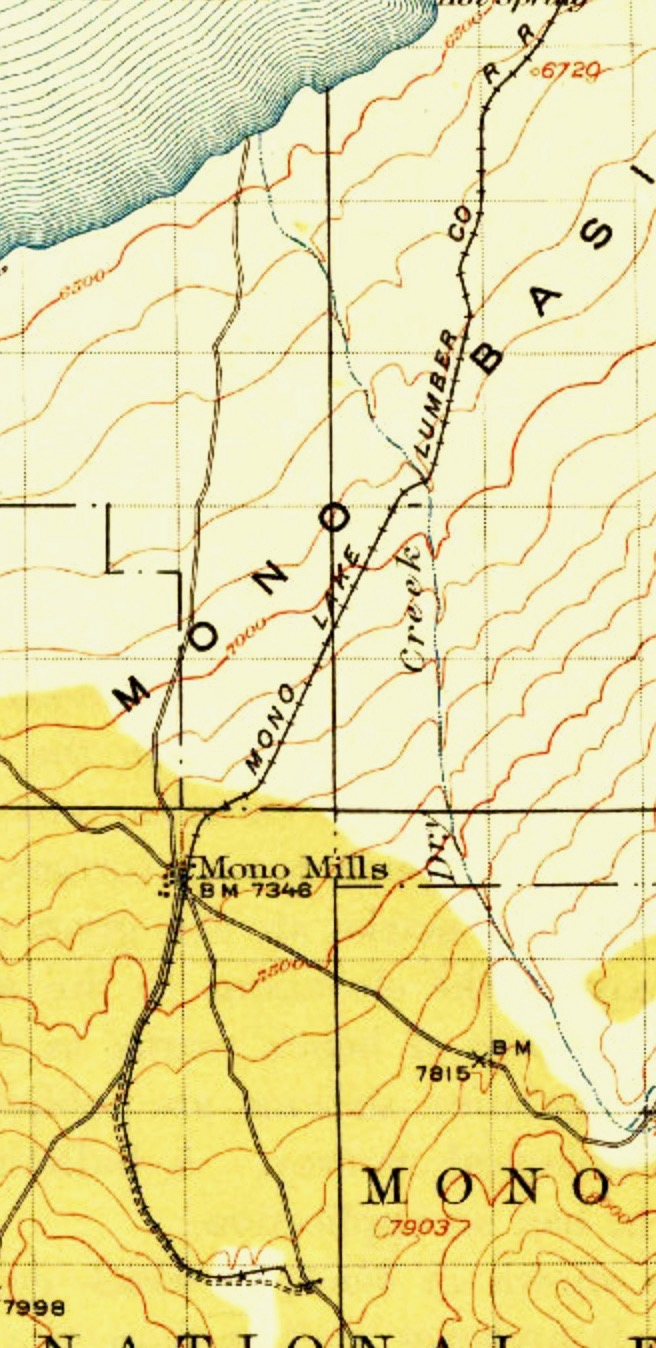
Mono Mills termination point in 1914
