= Northern Railway (California) =

Railroad holding company between 1871–1898

The Northern Railway was a non-operating subsidiary of the Southern Pacific Railroad during the 19th century, created primarily as a device to consolidate the management of a number of smaller subsidiary railroads. The initial railroad opened in 1876 from Woodland, California, to Williams; and extended to Willows in 1878, and to Tehama in 1882. In 1877, a line of the Northern Railway was built between Oakland and Martinez. On May 15, 1888, the Northern Railway was consolidated with the Winters and Ukiah Railway; Woodland, Capay, and Clear Lake Railroad; West Side and Mendocino Railroad; Vaca Valley and Clear Lake Railroad; San Joaquin and Sierra Nevada Railroad (narrow gauge); Sacramento and Placerville Railroad; Shingle Springs and Placerville Railroad; Santa Rosa and Carquinez Railroad; Amador Branch Railroad; and Berkeley Branch Railroad, forming the Northern Railway Company. It was merged into the Southern Pacific Railroad system in 1898.

== Sources ==
This article incorporates text from a free content work. Licensed under the public domain as a work of the State of California made before 1929. (license statement/permission). Text taken from Tenth Annual Report of the Board of Railroad Commissioners of the State of California for the Year Ending December 31, 1889, California Board of Railroad Commissioners, State of California.
