= Highland Line (Pacific Electric) =

Streetcar route in California, U.S.

Highland

Overview
- Status: Defunct
- Owner: Pacific Electric
- Locale: San Bernardino, California
- Termini: San Bernardino; Highland

Service
- Type: Streetcar
- System: Pacific Electric
- Operator(s): Pacific Electric

History
- Opened: 1903
- Closed: July 20, 1936

Technical
- Line length: 6.56 mi (10.56 km)
- Number of tracks: 1–2
- Track gauge: 1,435 mm (4 ft 8 1/2 in) standard gauge
- Old gauge: 3 ft 6 in (1,067 mm)
- Electrification: Overhead line, 600 V DC

The Highland Line was a 6.56-mile (10.56 km) local streetcar route of the Pacific Electric Railway. It ran from the San Bernardino Depot to Highland. A short branch line served the Southern California State Asylum for the Insane and Inebriates at Patton.

== History ==
A franchise for the line's construction was requested by the San Bernardino Valley Traction Company in 1902. Constructed by the San Bernardino, Arrowhead & Waterman Railway in 1903, the line was sold to Pacific Electric the following year. Passenger service to Patton ended in June 1924. By September 1934, the line was only served by a single trip, primarily for use by schoolchildren. This was discontinued on July 20, 1936 with parallel bus routes being in service as a replacement.
