= Boca and Loyalton Railroad =

Railroad in California, U.S.

Overview
- Locale: California
- Dates of operation: 1898–1916
- Successor: Western Pacific Railroad

Technical
- Track gauge: 4 ft 8 1/2 in (1,435 mm) standard gauge
- Length: 56.49 miles (90.91 km)

The Boca and Loyalton Railroad was built to serve sawmills in the Sierra Nevada of northern California. It became the Loyalton branch of the Western Pacific Railroad.

== History ==
The Lewis brothers built a standard gauge railway about 1897 from the Southern Pacific early transcontinental line at Boca, California, seventeen miles north to their sawmill in Sardine Valley. The sawmill was moved to Loyalton, California after the Sardine Valley forests were cut, and the rail line was extended to Loyalton as the Boca & Loyalton on 24 September 1900. Several other lumber companies built sawmills in the Loyalton area once rail service was available to ship lumber produced at their elevation of 4,950 feet (1,510 m) over a 6,300-foot (1,900 m) summit with grades of up to three percent and thence down to Boca at an elevation of 5,534 feet (1,687 m). The railroad was soon extended northwesterly from Loyalton to Beckwourth and Portola, California. The Western Pacific Railroad purchased the Boca & Loyalton line from Portola to Beckwourth as part of its main line constructed through the area in 1908. Much of the timber had been cut in the Loyalton area by 1916, and commodities formerly shipped through Loyalton to or from the Southern Pacific were being carried by the Western Pacific. Trackage over the summit between Loyalton and Boca was abandoned that year, and Western Pacific began operating the line north of Loyalton as their Loyalton branch.

== Locomotives ==
Number	Builder	Type	Date	Works number	Notes
1	Baldwin Locomotive Works	0-4-4T	1892		Vauclain compound purchased from South Side Elevated Railroad in 1898; used for construction of Western Pacific Railroad; sold to Natomas Gravel Company about 1913 and scrapped in 1937
2	Baldwin Locomotive Works	4-4-0	1875		purchased from Pennsylvania Railroad in 1898; used for construction of Western Pacific
3	Baldwin Locomotive Works	2-6-0	1876	3889	purchased from Virginia and Truckee Railroad which was there#23 Santiago in 1901; scrapped by Western Pacific in 1916
4	Baldwin Locomotive Works	2-6-0	1876	3891	built for Virginia & Truckee as #19 the Truckee; purchased from Verdi Lumber Company in 1902; became Western Pacific #123; scrapped in June 1930
5	Baldwin Locomotive Works	2-8-0	1882	6085	purchased from Cincinnati, New Orleans and Texas Pacific Railway in 1902; became Western Pacific #124; scrapped in November 1949
6	Rhode Island Locomotive Works	4-6-0	1875		purchased in 1902
7	Pittsburgh Locomotive and Car Works	4-6-0	1888	978	purchased from Pittsburgh and Lake Erie Railroad in 1902; became Western Pacific #125; scrapped in December 1934

== Clover Valley Lumber Company ==
Clover Valley Lumber Company was organized in 1917 to take over the Loyalton area sawmills as local timber resources became scarce. It operated a number of forest railway branches in the area from 1921 until 1957.

Number	Builder	Type	Date	Works number	Notes
3	Lima Locomotive Works	3-truck Shay locomotive	1913	2672	purchased from Verdi Lumber Company in 1927; scrapped in 1955
4	Baldwin Locomotive Works	2-6-6-2 tank locomotive	1924	57684	purchased new; preserved on the Niles Canyon Railway
8	Baldwin Locomotive Works	2-6-2	1907	32160	purchased from Sierra Nevada Wood and Lumber Company
11	Lima Locomotive Works	2-truck Shay locomotive	1903	788	built for Sierra Railroad; purchased from Verdi Lumber Company in July 1938; scrapped in August 1952
50	Lima Locomotive Works	2-truck Shay locomotive	1908	2093	purchased from Argentine Central Railway by Marsh Lumber Company in 1913
60	Lima Locomotive Works	2-truck Shay	1904	959	built for White Oak Coal Company of Kentucky; purchased from Western Pine Lumber Company of Washington in April 1920
