= California Central Railroad =

Northern California pioneer railroad (1857–1868) from Folsom to Lincoln, California

- C. C. R. R. or Cal Central

Overview
- Headquarters: Sacramento, CA; Folsom, CA; Lincoln, CA
- Locale: Folsom, CA to Lincoln, CA; April 1864, Junction (Roseville), CA
- Dates of operation: April 21, 1857–July 22, 1868
- Successor: California and Oregon Railroad (1868); Central Pacific Railroad (1870)

Technical
- Track gauge: Roseville to Lincoln, 4 ft 8 1/2 in (1,435 mm) standard gauge
- Previous gauge: 5 ft (1,524 mm)
- Length: 18.5 miles, Folsom to Lincoln (1861–1864); 10.3 miles, Roseville to Lincoln (1864–1868)

The California Central Railroad (CCRR) was incorporated on April 21, 1857, to build a railroad from Folsom to Marysville, as an extension of the Sacramento Valley Railroad which terminated at Folsom. The first division of the CCRR was 18.5 miles (29.8 km) long; it started at Folsom, crossed the American River, and ended at the new town of Lincoln, twenty-four miles south of Marysville. The bridge over the American River was the first railroad bridge of any importance built in California, and the American the first river in California crossed by trains. In 1858, California Central was probably the first California railroad to employ Chinese laborers and first to demonstrate that "Chinese laborers can be profitably employed in grading railroads in California."

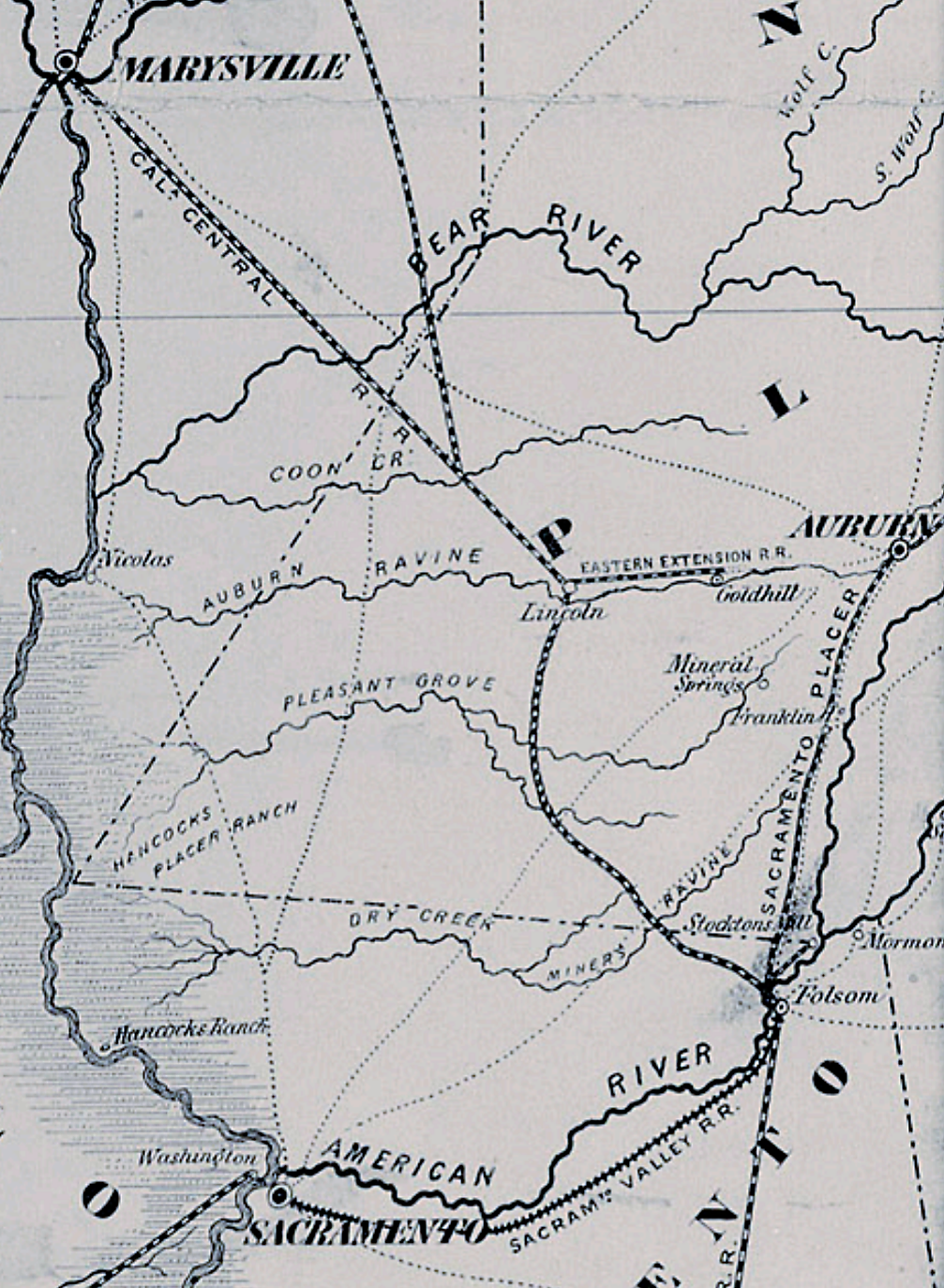
1860 map of the projected Cal Central Railroad (CCRR) from Folsom to Marysville; only the first division from Folsom to Lincoln was built by CCRR.

With the help of the Chinese laborers, CCRR was able to complete in October 1861 the first division of 18.5 miles of rails from Folsom to Lincoln, which was probably the first platted railroad town in California. Thereafter, CCRR was not able to complete the rest of the road to Marysville. In 1868, CCRR was consolidated into the California and Oregon Railroad (of 1868).

== History ==
The California Central Railroad (CCRR) was established April 21, 1857, to build a railroad from Folsom to Marysville as an extension of the Sacramento Valley Railroad, which was completed in 1856 from Sacramento to Folsom. The president of California Central was Colonel C. L. Wilson and chief engineer was his friend Theodore Judah. Building the CCRR was under the management contract dated May 1, 1857, of C. L. Wilson, who had served in a similar capacity with Sacramento Valley Railroad. After securing, on his trip to the East, sufficient funds and supplies for the railroad construction, Wilson returned to look for grading/bridging contractor(s) for the first division of the CCRR, which extended some eighteen miles from Folsom and crossed the American River.

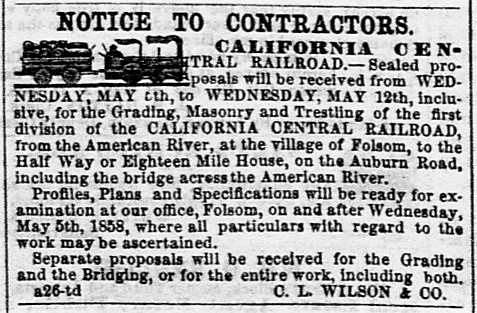
May 1858 advertisement for grading/bridging contractor proposals on the first division of the California Central Railroad

=== Building the First Division (1858–1861) ===
Ground breaking took place at Folsom on June 1, 1858. By mid-June, so many white workers left for the gold fields of the Fraser River that the contractor (Chenery & Co.) resorted to hire some fifty Chinese laborers and found out that "Chinese laborers can be profitably employed in grading railroads in California." This was one of the earliest employment in California of Chinese laborers for railroad building. In Fall 1859, S. S. Montague was hired by CCRR (his first job in California), which was probably where he met Judah.

The heaviest grading on the road to Lincoln was in the first five miles from Folsom to the American river and beyond, which involved three main cuts that demanded the use of powder. The grading was accomplished with a labor force of about a hundred men, inclusive of the Chinese laborers. The American river was crossed by building a single-span 300-ton truss bridge, 213 feet long, adapted from a design by S.W. Hall to support 120 tons of load, resting on stone piers, the top of which was 25 feet by 9 feet, constructed on the two banks of the river. According to the Sacramento Daily Union, this bridge was "the first railroad bridge of any importance built in the State" and the American "the first river crossed by a train of cars".

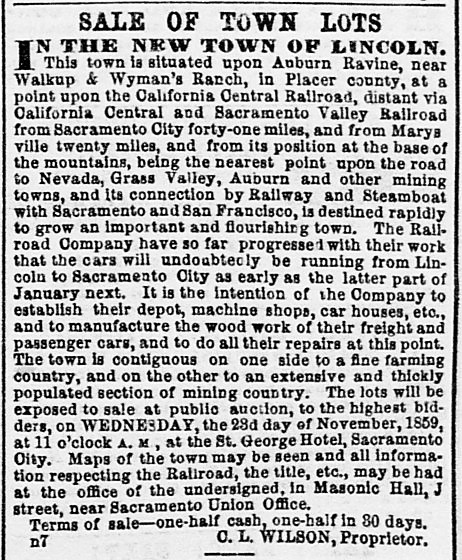
November 1859 announcement: founding town lot sale in Lincoln by Charles Lincoln Wilson

At Auburn Ravine, where the line makes an elbow and turns northward toward Marysville, a new town called Lincoln was located earlier by Judah with town lots on sale from Wilson. At an auction in Sacramento in November 1859, over four thousand dollars was realized from the sales of lots in Lincoln, ranging from 20 to 400 dollars for each lot.

Upon the completion of the grading on the first division of the 18.5-mile road from Folsom to Lincoln, track laying began at Folsom on December 30, 1859. On February 15, 1860, the locomotive Sacramento, from the Sacramento Valley Railroad, crossed the bridge over the American river at Folsom with four freight cars loaded with about thirty tons of iron and ties for the CCRR, which was deposited three miles beyond the bridge.

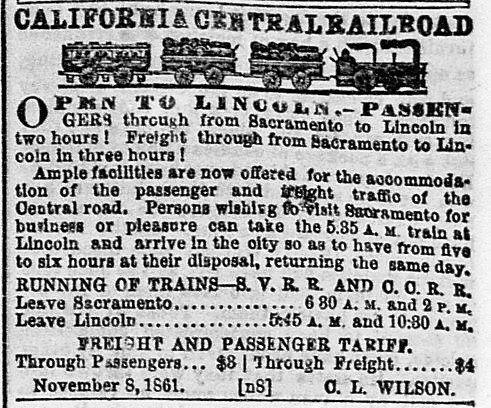
November 1861 CCRR announcement that the railroad is open to the new railroad town of Lincoln

Delays in tracklaying stretched about a year into summer 1861. That same summer, Judah, working for Central Pacific Railroad as its chief engineer, completed a thorough instrumental survey of the route by the Donner Pass to demonstrate the practicability of the Central Pacific line through the Sierras. Meanwhile, with the help of the Chinese laborers, CCRR was finally able to bring to completion on October 14, 1861, a 5 ft (1,524 mm) gauge line on one track between Folsom and Lincoln. The completion of the railroad "changed the appearance of the locality, and breathed into the town the breath of life", birthing probably the first platted railroad town in California.

=== Aftermath (1862–1868) ===
In 1862, California Central had two locomotives in service between Folsom and Lincoln — the "Lincoln" and the "Harry Wilson"— one in Sacramento yet to run — the "Garibaldi" — and one on order. As the northern terminus of CCRR, the new town of Lincoln showed signs of growth. Even so, CCRR was never able to complete its road to Marysville.

In November 1862, in an attempt to extend the CCRR road from Lincoln towards Marysville, Col. Wilson was one of several to incorporate the Yuba Railroad, with Samuel Brannan as President. A year later, in December 1863, Yuba Railroad was completely reorganized with new directors and new President, Frank Pixley. The following summer, the company entered into contract with Col. Wilson to build the extension from Lincoln to Marysville, who then left for the Atlantic states to secure the iron necessary. He returned April 1865.

Meanwhile, in December 1862, Charles Crocker, one of the Big Four of the Central Pacific Railroad, resigned from the Directorate to receive two days later the contract to Charles Crocker & Co. to grade the first eighteen miles from Sacramento to a junction crossing the existing CCRR tracks. The work was inaugurated in January 1863 and the grading started February 1863. On April 26, 1864, the Central Pacific opened the Pacific Railroad from Sacramento towards Rocklin, which crossed and sliced in two the already operating CCRR line from Folsom north to Lincoln. The crossing location was at Griders (an existing stage coach station), which became known as Junction, then eventually as Roseville. According to historian Noble, this was a power play by Central Pacific for the federal financing authorized by the 1862 Pacific Railroad Acts, and the power play rendered the CCRR tracks from Folsom to Junction effectively useless. Unlike CCRR, Central Pacific received federal bonds of $16,000 per mile for that portion of their road between Sacramento and Arcade Creek, about seven miles, and $48,000 per mile east of that point, in addition to land grants.

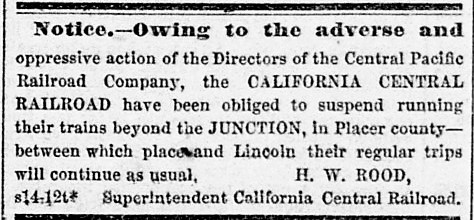
September 1865 Ad taken by California Central Railroad objecting to the actions of Central Pacific against it.

A year later in August 1865, Central Pacific maneuvered its way to buy controlling interest in the management of Sacramento Valley, the trunk line to CCRR, thereby diverting the profitable over-mountain Washoe trade and travel, worth several million dollars annually, to Central Pacific. Under its control, the wide gauge of the Sacramento Valley track and rolling stock was reduced to the standard gauge of the Pacific Railroad.

That same month, the Sacramento county sheriff announced a CCRR rolling stock sale, of all its locomotives and cars, to satisfy a claim for $139,755.59 (equivalent to $2,870,762 in 2024), in favor of Samuel Brannan and against C. L. Wilson and CCRC owners, with interest due from June 14, 1864, at 2% compounding monthly. After many postponements, the sale took place in December 1865. According to Pixley, Central Pacific brokered the Sacramento sale for the Yuba Railroad, while in New York Col. Wilson and C. P. Huntington of Central Pacific settled the suit and all differences, and thereafter the CCRR rolling stock and CCRR tracks would be all reduced to standard gauge for use by the Pacific Railroad.

In February 1866, the tracks from Lincoln to Roseville (10.3 miles; 16.6 km) was re-laid to the standard gauge of the Pacific Railroad. By the fall of the same year, the CCRR bridge over the American river near Folsom was condemned, no crossing of trains permitted, sealing the demise of the CCRR line from Folsom to Roseville. In September 1867, the CCRR rolling stock along with the road was sold to Central Pacific.

On July 22, 1868, the CCRR company was foreclosed and existing operations were purchased by the California and Oregon Railroad (of 1868), which was subsequently consolidated into the Central Pacific in August 1870.
