= Butte County Railroad =

Former railway line in the United States

Overview
- Headquarters: Chico, California
- Locale: Butte County, California
- Dates of operation: 1903–1915

Technical
- Track gauge: 4 ft 8 1/2 in (1,435 mm) standard gauge

The Butte County Railroad was a 31.5-mile (50.7 km) class II railroad that ran from a connection with the Southern Pacific Railroad at Chico, California to the Diamond Match Company lumber mill at Stirling City. The railroad operated from 1903–1915 and then became the Southern Pacific's Stirling City Branch. From 1915 until abandonment in the 1970s the line was operated as the Southern Pacific's Stirling City Branch. The Chico and Northern Railroad was a non-operating subsidiary holding company of the Southern Pacific Railroad that was created to acquire a 32.31 mile line from Chico – Stirling City from the Butte County Railroad. Upon acquiring the line, Chico & Northern immediately leased the line back to the Butte County Railroad. The Chico & Northern was dissolved into Southern Pacific in 1912 and never operated any of the line.

== History ==
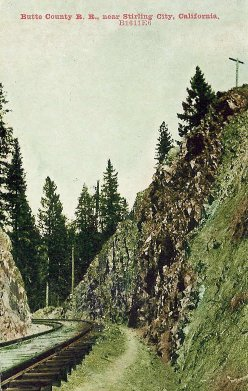
The Butte County Railroad near Stirling City in 1910

The Butte County Railroad was granted a franchise on November 11, 1902 and incorporated on February 24, 1903 or March 2, 1903. Construction of the line commenced in April 1903 and seven months later, on November 1, 1903, service commenced between Barber (1 mile south of Chico) and Magalia. The line was built using 75# rails and with grades as steep as 3.75%.

The Chico & Northern was incorporated on November 11, 1903. Within a month of reaching Magalia, on November 27, 1903, the line was sold to the Southern Pacific Railroad via SP's non-operating subsidiary holding company the Chico and Northern Railroad. SP's Chico and Northern Railroad immediately leased the line back to the Butte County Railroad for operation. A year after commencing construction the line was operating all the way to Stirling City and completed on April 15, 1904.

The Chico & Northern Railroad was finally dissolved into SP on February 29, 1912. The line was then conveyed to SP's sister company, the Central Pacific Railway. In 1914 the line was conveyed from CP back to the SP. The Butte County Railroad's lease with SP expired on November 30, 1915. The Butte County Railroad was dissolved two months later on January 21, 1916 at which point the line became the Stirling City Branch and was operated by the Southern Pacific Railroad.

== Route ==
Skyway Road from Chico to Stirling City loosely follows the route of the entire railroad line.

- Barber (1 or 2 miles (3.2 km) south of Chico)
- Butte Creek
- Paradise
- Optimo
- Magalia (SP MP 203.2)
- Doon
- Stirling City

== Motive Power ==
The Butte County Railroad used four steam locomotives to run on the line

1. Baldwin 2-8-0 Consolidation Type (Builder No. 20192) built in March 1902 and was later SP #2503
2. Baldwin 4-4-0 American Type (Builder No. 9711) built in December 1888 that was later SP #1304
3. Baldwin 4-4-0 American Type built in 1887
4. Schenectady 2-8-0 Consolidation Type (Builder No. 29704) that was built new for the Butte County Railroad in April 1904 and later became SP #2502.

== Abandonment and the line today ==
The last regular service by the Southern Pacific Railroad over the line was in 1974 and the tracks were removed in 1979. The grade is still visible between Magalia and Stirling City where it crosses Skyway Road. The grade through Paradise is now the Paradise Memorial Trailway

According to Union Pacific Track Charts, the ICC authorized abandonment of 26 miles (42 km) of the branch from Milepost 189.0 (east of Chico) to Milepost 215.46 (end of the line at Stirling City) on December 3, 1977. The ICC again authorized abandonment of 3 more miles of track at Chico between Mileposts 185.69 and 189.0. Today, what remains of the branch is now known as the Stirling City Industrial Lead and runs from the junction with the mainline at Chico (MP 185.0) and ends at 185.69, running next to the Diamond Match Company.

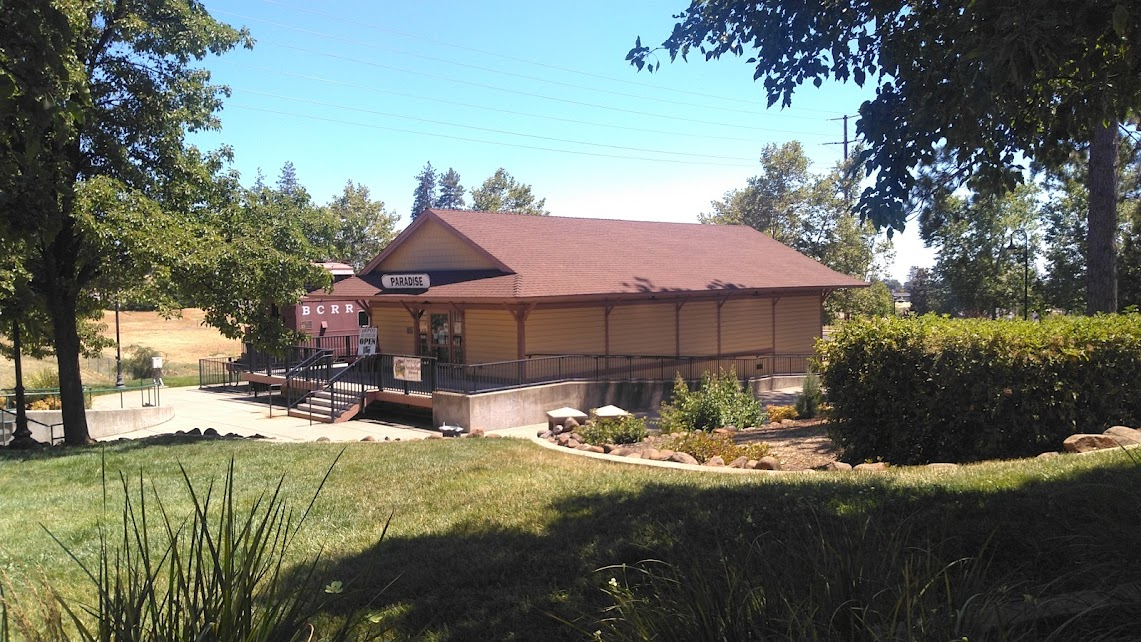
The former Paradise depot in 2024.

The Paradise depot, (Butte County Railroad, later Southern Pacific), remains at its original location, and is now operated, maintained, and staffed by the Gold Nugget Museum. The up-bound side of the Skyway from Chico, (right around Bruce Rd.), sits on the old right of way, until where the bike trail picks up at Neal Rd. in Paradise. The current bike trail to the top of Paradise is also on the old right of way, and can be seen crossing the respective streets in town where tracks sat. The grade is still visible between Magalia and Stirling City in several places, including where it crosses the Skyway near the Magalia Reservoir.

The bike trail runs past the Magalia Southern Pacific Depot (an SP Common Standard No. 22 design), which remained at its original location (6818 Depot Lane) and intermittently housed a series of restaurants (the Lovin' Oven Bagel Cafe, then later The Depot Restaurant and Café.) until the building was destroyed in the Camp Fire on November 8, 2018.
