= Bodie and Benton Railway and Commercial Company =

Narrow gauge railway in California

Bodie & Benton Railway
Overview
- Locale: Mono County, California
- Dates of operation: 1881–1917

Technical
- Track gauge: 3 ft (914 mm)

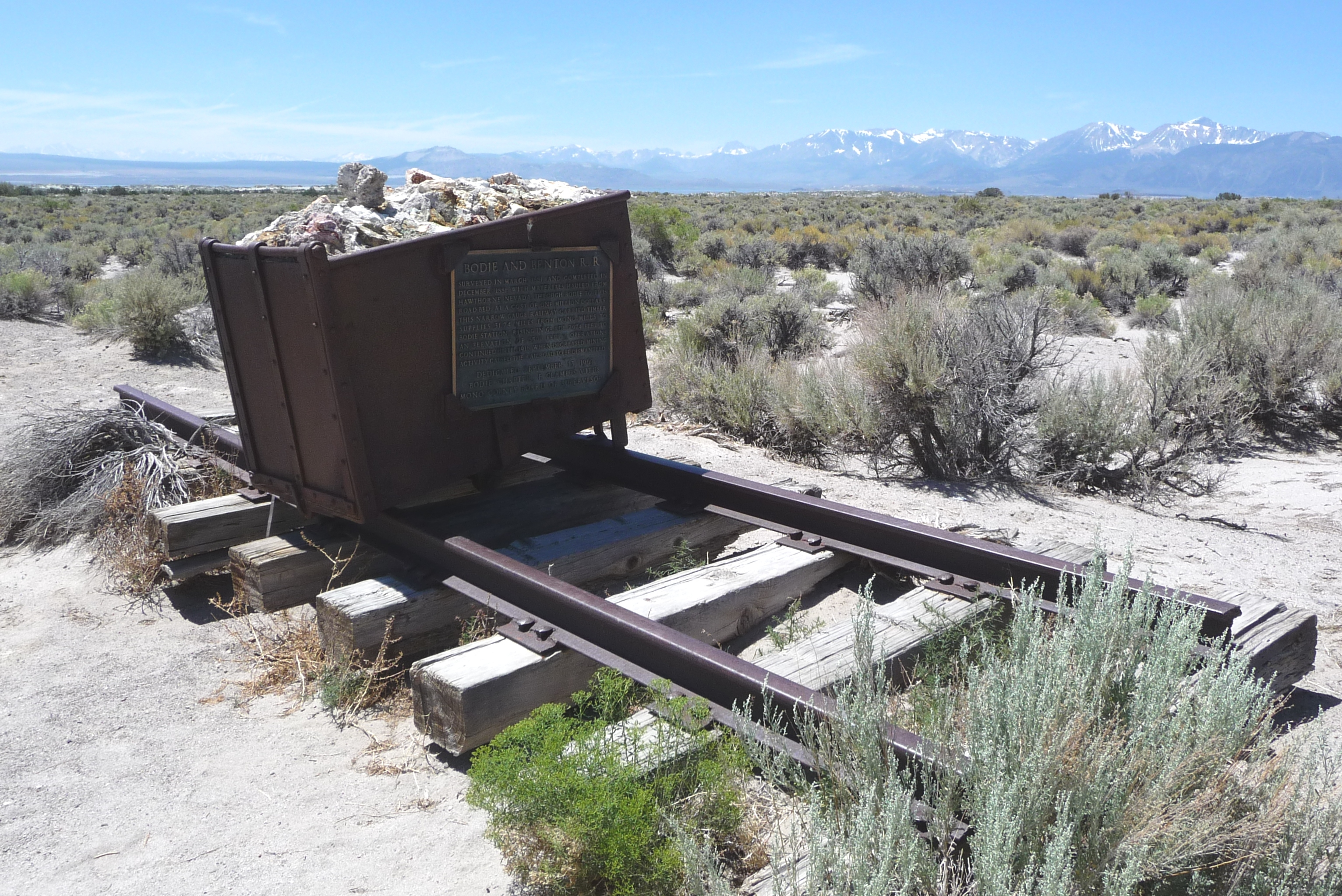
Monument for the Bodie and Benton Railway.

The Bodie & Benton Railway was a 3 ft (914 mm) narrow gauge common carrier railroad in California, from the Mono Mills to a terminus in Bodie, now a ghost town, in Mono County. It was unusual among U.S. railroads in that it was completely isolated from the rest of the railroad system.

== History ==
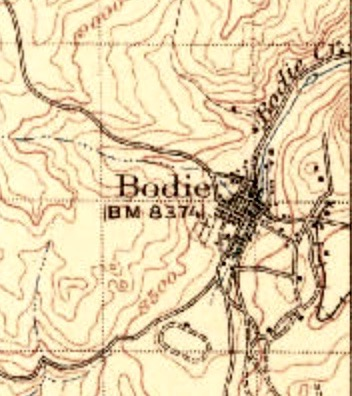
Bodie termination

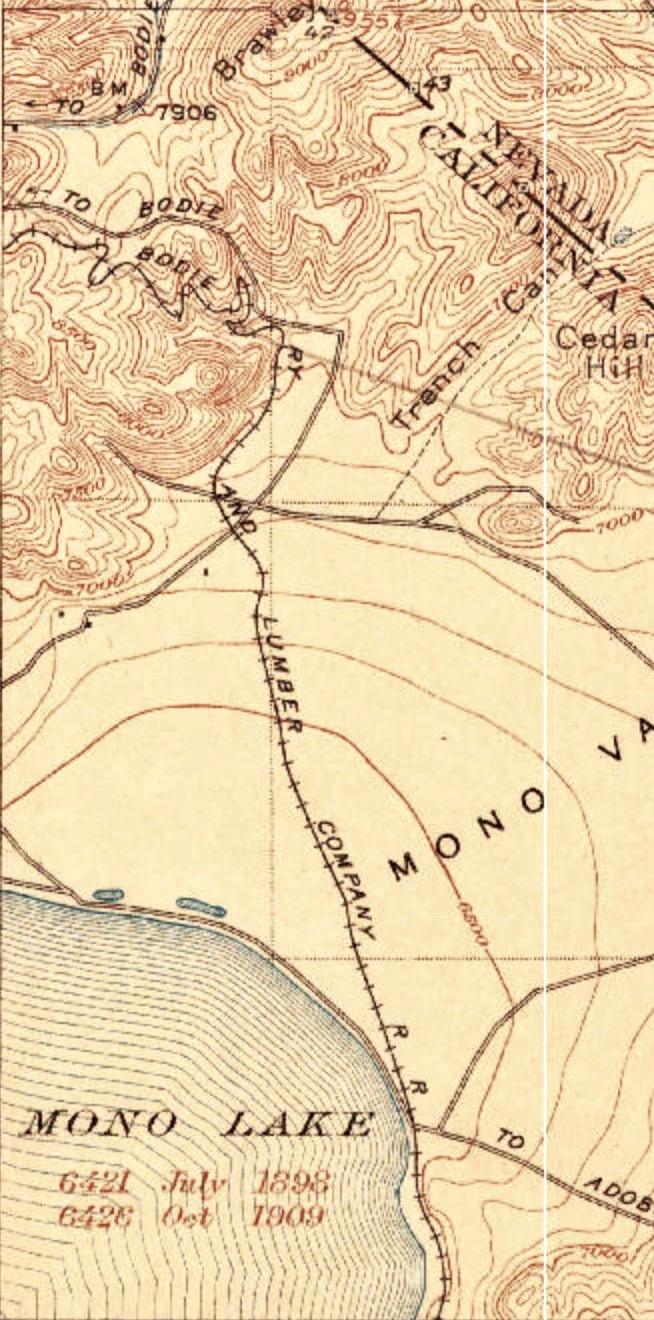
Bodie and Benton Railway route

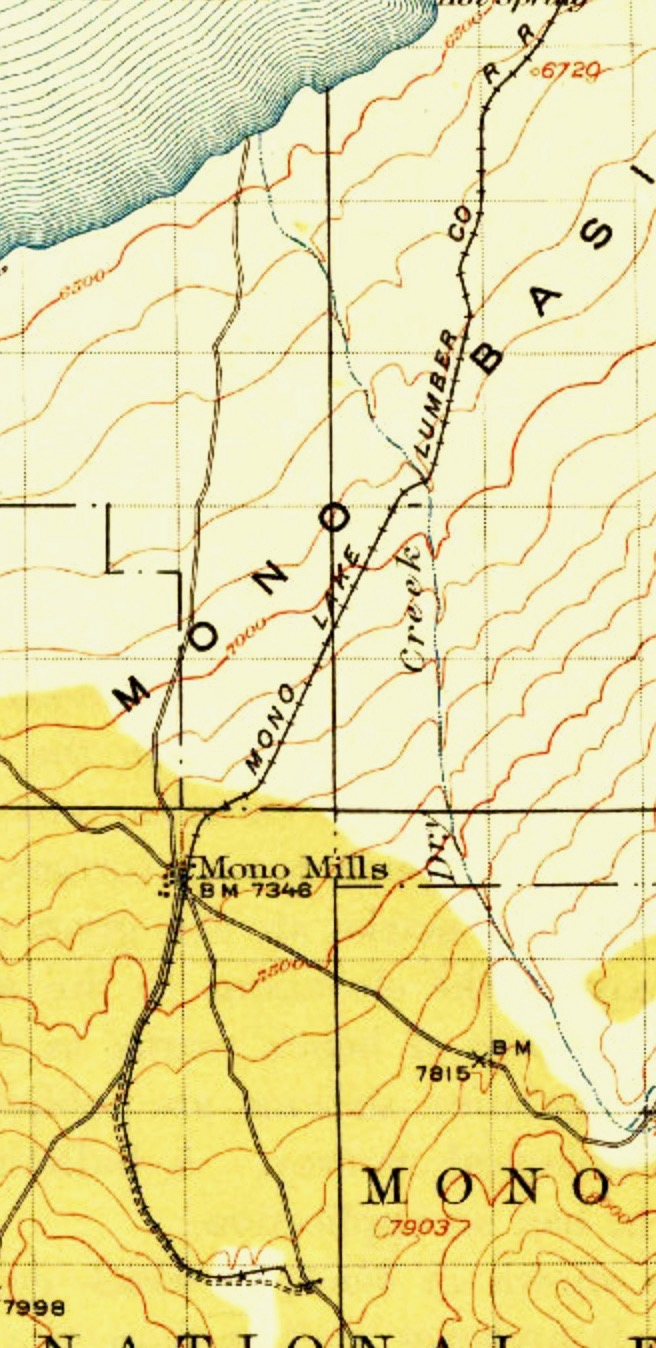
Mono Mills termination point in 1914

As the Bodie Railway & Lumber Company, the railroad was established in 1881 to link the gold-mining town of Bodie to the Bodie Wood and Lumber Company's newly built sawmill, Mono Mills, 32 miles south of Bodie along the eastern shore of Mono Lake. The line was completed and operational on November 14, 1881. Temporary spurs into timberlands were built in 1882.

Initial operations proved so successful that plans were made to extend a rail line from the Warm Springs station to the Carson and Colorado Railroad, then under construction, at Benton, California. Consequently, the company changed its name to the Bodie and Benton Railway and Commercial Company to reflect this. Construction on this extension was begun in 1882 and approximately nine miles were graded before construction ceased abruptly. No tracks were ever laid upon this grade. While the railway never gave an official justification for abandoning the project, the prevailing theory held by locals (at least as late as 1908) was that the owners of the lumber company at Mono Mills feared that access to the wider rail network would cause competition with other lumber operations in the Tahoe area in which they had a financial stake. Although the extension was never completed, the railway kept the name. In an ironic footnote, when the railway ceased to be profitable in 1918, due primarily to a decline in mining activity in Bodie, the rails and all valuable equipment were pulled up and sold. The rails and equipment were trucked from the southern terminus at Mono Mills along what is today State Route 120, to the rail line at Benton for transport south. At least some of the locomotives and rolling stock were reportedly sold to a plantation somewhere in Hawaii, while the rails and other equipment were shipped to the Philippines. Given the dates involved, this may have been to the Manila Railroad.

The ruling grade was 3.8%, steep for a common carrier but shallow for a logging railroad, which meant the line did not need geared locomotives. It rostered a selection of 2-6-0 "Mogul" types and tank locomotives.

== Remains ==
The Bodie depot still exists and is mostly intact. It is part of the Bodie State Historic Park. As it stands in a section of the park that is considered hazardous due to the presence of open shafts, it may only be viewed by visitors on special guided tours.

== Locomotive roster ==
The Bodie and Benton rostered the following locomotives during its history:

Number	Name	Arrangement	Builder	Year	Notes
1		0-6-0T	Prescott Scott	1881	
2		0-6-0T	Prescott Scott	1881	
Second 2	Inyo	2-6-0			
3	Mono	2-6-0	Baldwin Locomotive Works	1874	Ex Eureka and Palisade Railroad No.2
4	Bodie	0-4-2T	H. K. Porter, Inc	1882	

Note: The two 0-6-0 locomotives were rebuilt to 2-6-0 configuration at some point due to a tendency to derail on sharp curves. The two "#2" locomotive entries above probably represent the same locomotive. The locomotive "#1" appears may have been named Tybo.
