= Los Angeles Terminal Railway =

American small terminal railroad line

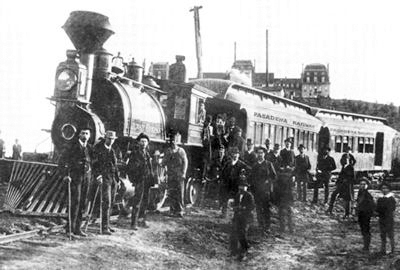
The Los Angeles Terminal Railway in Pasadena near Raymond Hotel in background, c. 1888

The Los Angeles Terminal Railway, earlier known as the Pasadena Railway, and unofficially as the Altadena Railway, was a small terminal railroad line that was constructed between Altadena and Pasadena, California in the late 1880s. It was a byproduct of a land boom period and a victim of the land bust that occurred soon thereafter. It opened officially on January 31, 1888.

== Inception ==
The service was originally organized as the Pasadena Railway Company in 1887 by investors John Woodbury, James Swartout, and the two prominent and wealthy Altadenans, Andrew McNally and Colonel George Gill Green, mutual friends of McNally from Chicago and Green from Woodbury, New Jersey.

Swartout had a large estate between New York Dr. and Boston St. near Maiden Lane which lies in a lower section of Altadena near the Pasadena border. He already owned the horse drawn Highland Railroad Company which accessed his property. Brothers John and Frederick Woodbury were the developers of the Altadena community located north of Pasadena against the San Gabriel Mountains. Frederick had a Ranch house near the Piedmont (Altadena Drive) and John had proposed building a mansion near the homes of McNally and Green.

Andrew McNally was the co-founder of the famed map making company Rand McNally in Chicago and had retired to Altadena in 1887. Green had made his fortunes in patent medicines and elixirs with his company based in Woodbury, New Jersey and was invited by McNally to move to Altadena in the same year. McNally and Green were heavily invested in the small railway, and each had a siding for his own private car to be pulled up alongside their properties which stood on either side of Santa Rosa Avenue from each other.

== Route description ==
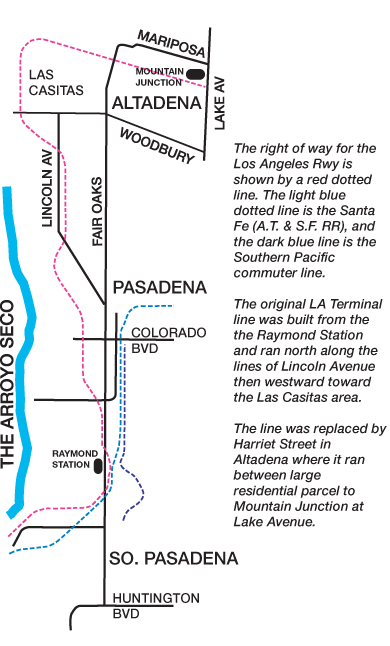

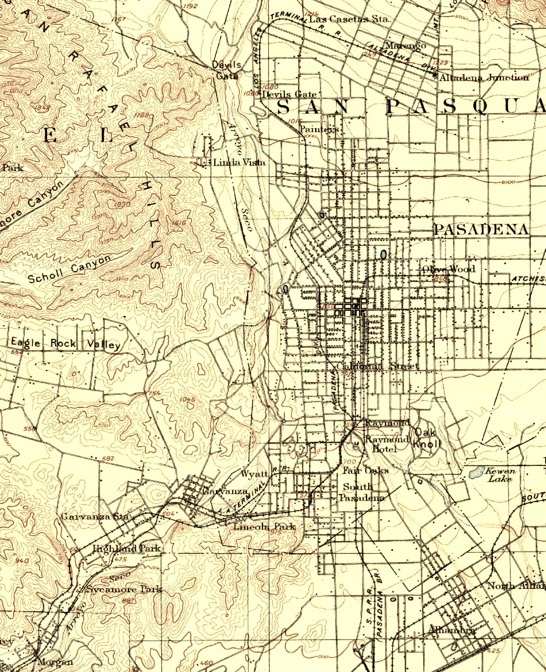
Route in 1894

The railway originated at a terminus near the Raymond Station by the Raymond Hotel which was the premier Pasadena winter residence for many eastern magnates. The rails roughly paralleled Fair Oaks Avenue, then crossed Lincoln Avenue to the east then again to the west and headed toward the Arroyo Seco. It turned northward to an area called Las Casitas (the little houses) then swung wide to the east to an alignment with today's Harriet Street in Altadena and ran between Mendocino and Calaveras streets to a terminus on Lake Avenue which would align with the present-day Altadena Post Office building. This right-of-way agrees with the original plan of a railroad on Woodbury's 1887 plot map, and lends support to the idea that this railroad had greater purpose than that of appeasing a couple of millionaires, even though they were often the only riders.

Depending on which end of the railway one might live, the line was called either the Pasadena Railroad or the Altadena Railroad. The Altadena terminus when adjoined by Professor Lowe's Mount Lowe Railway was then named "Mountain Junction."

== Expansion of the line ==
By 1890, the Pasadena/Altadena Railway was assumed by a couple of other failing rail lines that connected it to Los Angeles. It became an immediate success. In July 1891, it was joined again with a line that connected it to San Pedro. The line was renamed the Los Angeles Terminal Railway, and subsequently so was its San Pedro terminus at Rattlesnake Island, now Terminal Island.

The original Woodbury plan to have a line run from an Altadena railroad yard to Salt Lake City, Utah, was still in the offing, but the railway's financial difficulties made such an expansion impossible. In 1891, the principals of the Los Angeles Terminal Railway, including Los Angeles mayor William H. Workman were again thinking of building a road to Salt Lake City. Up to this time there were many railroads that had gone so far as to plot their plans on paper. Union Pacific Railroad (UP) was alone in any effort at all to construct this line. However, only one titan was willing to put his money into action, William Andrews Clark, a wealthy Montana mining magnate and banker. In August, newspapers announced that the Los Angeles Terminal Railway had been purchased by Clark and that Henry Hawkgood had started surveys for Clark. Little known until this point was that Clark had also obtained all rights to the Utah and California Railroad (U&C), a line planned to build from Salt Lake City to the Nevada state line. Although the U&C was only a railroad on paper, it provided Clark with valuable information and location maps.

Incorporated in Salt Lake City in 1901 as the San Pedro, Los Angeles and Salt Lake Railroad, the line offered state-of-art passenger amenities even though its main attraction for Clark was the potential in freight services. E. H. Harriman (then President of Union Pacific) took immediate notice. This new "Salt Lake Route" utilized trackage in Utah originally constructed for the UP, and the UP held an equity interest in the new line. Renamed the Los Angeles and Salt Lake Railroad in 1916, the Salt Lake line was eventually absorbed into the UP system, and remains an integral part of that railroad today.

== Quarrying in the Arroyo Seco ==
By 1901, a spur track had been laid into the Arroyo Seco near Devil's Gate for the purpose of quarrying rock for the construction of the Los Angeles Harbor breakwater. By 1903 the trans-Altadena service was abandoned and the rails were pulled up. It took decades for the bordering properties to assume the abandoned right-of-way, and to this day slight traces of where the rail line passed through can be sleuthed out.

== Abandonment ==
By 1916, quarrying in the Arroyo had been abandoned since the rock material proved to be too unstable for its intended purposes, and by 1921, the Arroyo–Windsor lines were taken up. Shortly thereafter, there being found no viable use for the railway, the line beyond Howard Avenue was abandoned altogether.

The remainder of the line between Los Angeles and Howard Avenue in Pasadena became part of the San Pedro, Los Angeles and Salt Lake Railroad in 1901, then becoming fully owned by the Union Pacific in 1921. All trackage to Pasadena beyond Pasadena Avenue and French Avenue was abandoned on October 31st, 1969, due to a decreasing number of freight customers and the pending construction of what would be the 710 and 210 Freeways.

Today, only a fenced right of way can be seen passing between the buildings and houses between Windsor and El Sol Avenues in Altadena. A fenced-in section can also be seen adjacent to the northbound Lincoln Avenue off ramp of Interstate 210, where the train used to head toward the Las Casitas flats.
