= Sierra Valley & Mohawk Railway =

The Sierra Valley & Mohawk Railway was a narrow gauge railway in Northern California. The Sierra Valley & Mohawk was established in 1885. The railway ran from Mohawk, near Blairsden to Plumas Junction (modern day Hallelujah Junction), crossing over Beckwourth Pass where it connected with the Nevada–California–Oregon Railway aka NCO.

The railroad was later renamed the Sierra Valley Railroad. The Sierra Valley Railroad was controlled by the NCO in 1900 and later absorbed by the NCO in 1915. The Western Pacific Railroad later purchased the NCO and built their own Feather River Route through much of the same locale, including building a tunnel through Beckwourth Pass.
