= Iron Mountain Railway (California) =

Overview
- Headquarters: San Francisco, California
- Locale: California, United States
- Dates of operation: 1896–1927

Technical
- Track gauge: 3 ft (914 mm)

The Iron Mountain Railway was a narrow gauge common carrier railroad located northwest of Redding, California. Its line ran 11 miles (18 km) from Keswick, California on the Southern Pacific Railroad to Iron Mountain, California, at the base of Iron Mountain.

== Opening ==
The company was incorporated July 17, 1895 and the line was completed February 1, 1896. The primary cargo was ore and ore concentrate from the Iron Mountain Mine, though it increasingly serviced other mines as well. The railroad was owned by Mountain Copper Company which also owned the Iron Mountain Mine and the Hornet Mine, the railroad's primary ore supplier later in its operation.

== Closure ==
The Iron Mountain mine shut down in 1921 and an aerial tramway was built from the Hornet Mine directly to the Southern Pacific Railroad. With the closing of the last independent mine, common carrier status was abandoned on 5 February 1927 though limited service may have continued as late as 1929. The remaining line was salvaged by the early 1930s. Today much of the upper sections of the railroad bed is used by Iron Mountain Road.
