= Richmond Pacific Railroad =

Railway line in the United States

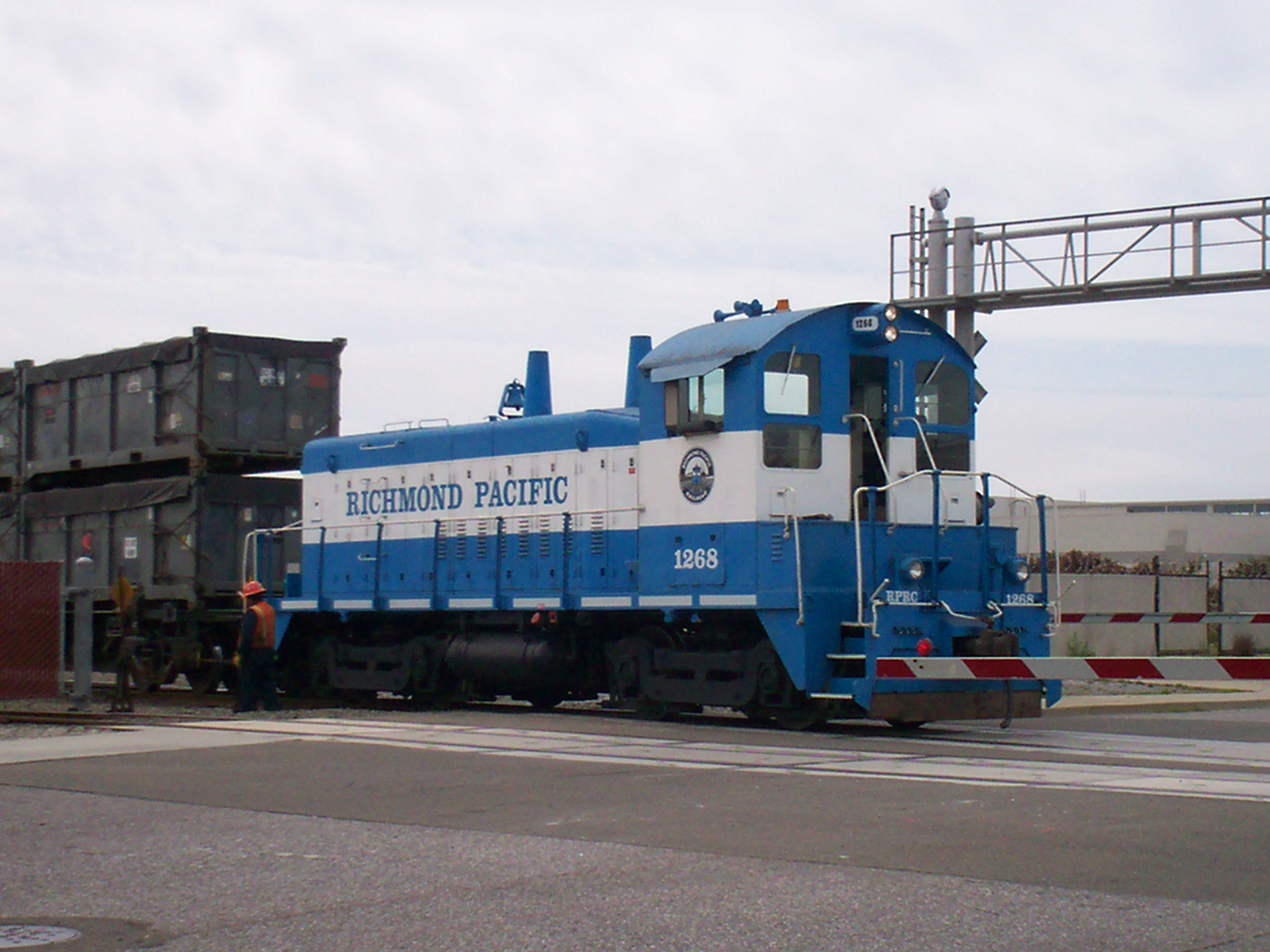
- RPRC 1268 performing switching operations.

Overview
- Headquarters: Richmond, California
- Reporting mark: RPRC
- Locale: Richmond, California
- Dates of operation: July 1950 (as Parr Terminal Railroad)–Present

Technical
- Track gauge: 4 ft 8 1/2 in (1,435 mm) standard gauge

Other

The Richmond Pacific Railroad (reporting mark RPRC) is a terminal railroad owned by the Levin-Richmond Terminal Corporation. The RPRC operates on 2.5 miles (4.0 km) of track in the shipping terminal and wharves at Richmond, California.

The RPRC also interchanges with the Union Pacific (UP) and BNSF Railway (BNSF). The shipping tariff is a flat rate of $210 per car or $310 per hazardous material car. The railroad operates two shifts, between 6 a.m. - 10 p.m. The railroad switches about 3,250 cars per year.

The RPRC was formerly known as the Parr Terminal Railroad (reporting mark PRT).

== History ==
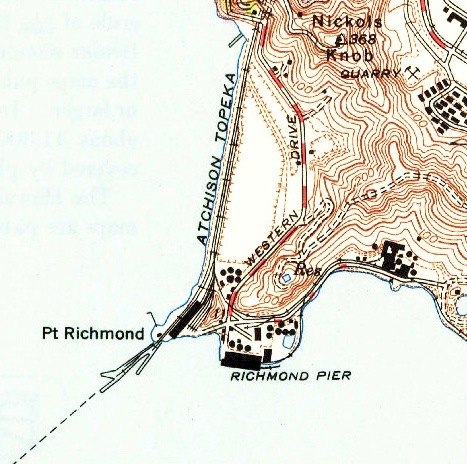
Parr-Richmond Terminal Military Reservation, Terminal 1 in 1948

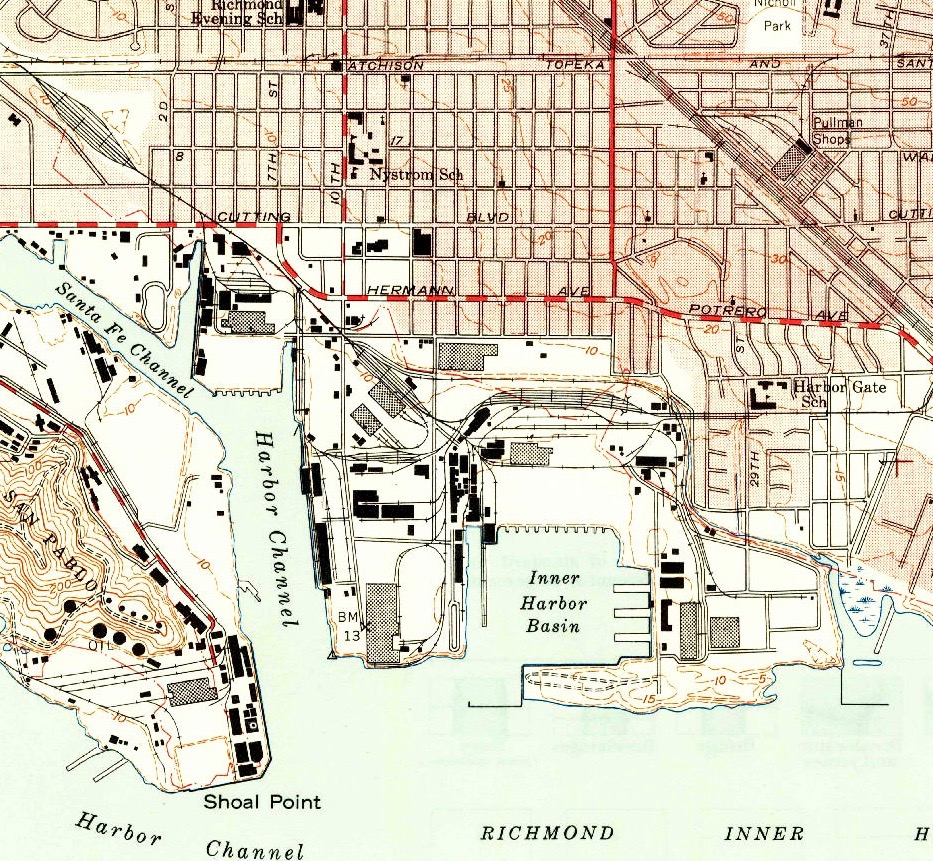
Richmond harbor in 1949

The PRT was incorporated in July 1950 as a terminal railroad to take over the private railroad of Parr-Richmond Industrial Corporation. In 1911, Terminal 1 was constructed as the primary port of the Port of Richmond. In the 1930s the City of Richmond entered an agreement with the Parr Company to operate the terminal. The terminal area was primarily used to unload crude oil from ships into storage tanks that supplied the local oil refineries. It also was used to transfer ship cargo to rail cars. The terminal was used as a ferry terminal prior to the opening of the Golden Gate Bridge.

During World War II the U.S. military created the Parr-Richmond Terminal Military Reservation. The military reservation was created as the result of a lease of 6.54 acres (26,500 m^{2}) dated April 19, 1943 at the Parr terminal area. The location was used to support World War II efforts and as warehouse/storage for military shipping at the Port of San Francisco.
