= Northwestern Pacific Railroad =

Regional railroad in California, US

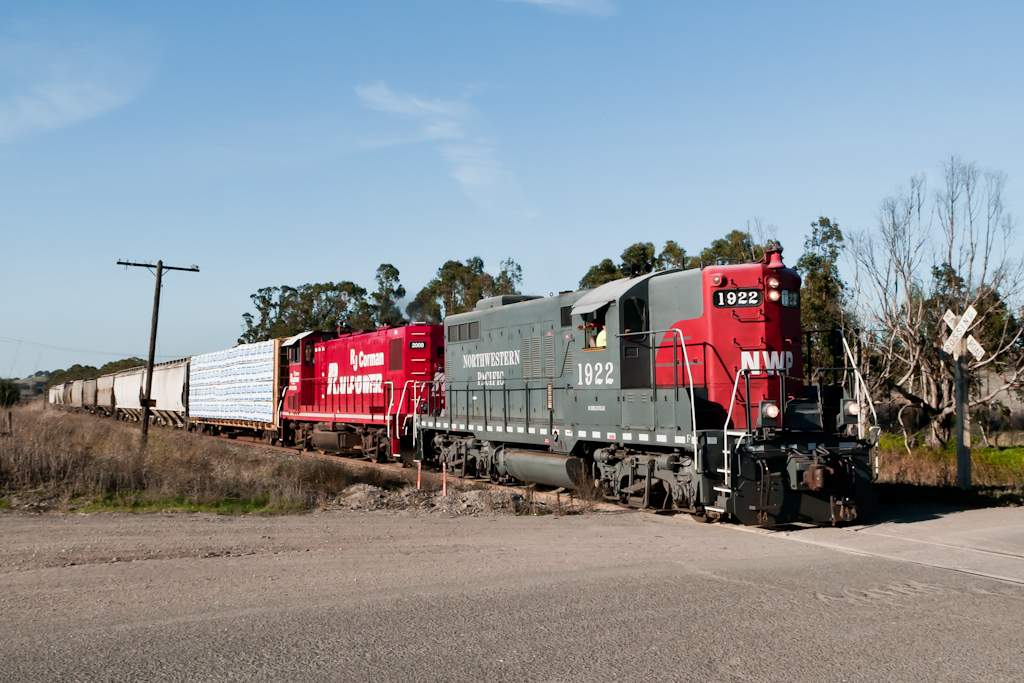
- NWP #1922 running freight near Petaluma, California; October 21, 2011

Overview
- Status: Operational (partial)
- Owner: Sonoma-Marin Area Rail Transit
- Termini: Schellville; Samoa
- Website: SMART Freight

Service
- System: NWP
- Operator(s): NWPco; Sonoma–Marin Area Rail Transit
- Depot(s): Freight: Schellville; Passenger: Mark West

History
- Opened: 1907
- 1989: North Coast Rail Authority established
- 2011: Service begins under NWPRA

Technical
- Line length: 271 mi (436 km); 62 mi (100 km) (operational)
- Character: freight and commuter railroad
- Track gauge: 1,435 mm (4 ft 8 1/2 in) standard gauge

The Northwestern Pacific Railroad is a 271-mile (436 km) mainline railroad from the former ferry connections in Sausalito, California north to Eureka, with a connection to the national railroad system at Schellville. The railroad has gone through a complex history of different ownership and operators but has maintained a generic name of reference as the Northwestern Pacific Railroad, despite no longer being officially named that.

Currently, only a 62-mile (100 km) stretch of mainline from Larkspur to the Town of Windsor and east to Schellville on the "south end" is operated by Sonoma–Marin Area Rail Transit (SMART), which operates both commuter and freight trains with plans for future extension north to Cloverdale. The "north end" from Willits to Eureka (which includes connections to the California Western Railroad) is out of service; it is planned to be converted into the Great Redwood Trail.

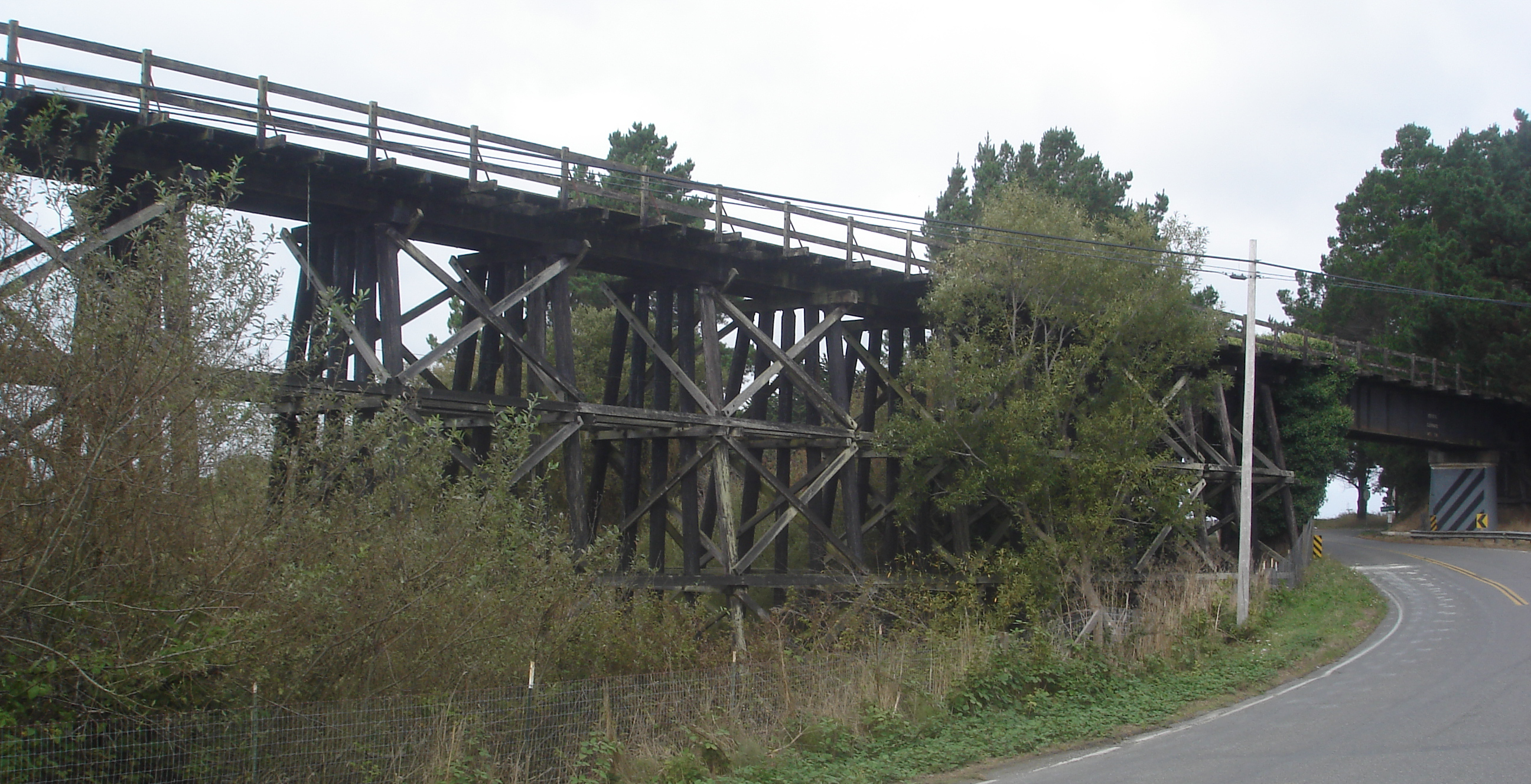
Vegetation encroaches on Swauger Creek trestle near Loleta.

== History ==
In the late 1800s both the Southern Pacific Railroad ("SP") and the Atchison, Topeka and Santa Fe Railway ("AT&SF") had great interests in building lines north from San Francisco to Humboldt County to transport lumber south. The Southern Pacific Railroad controlled the southern end of the line from Willits south to Marin and Schellville, while the AT&SF controlled line south from Eureka through Humboldt County. Both railroads planned to build a line north, the AT&SF starting with a boat connection in present-day Larkspur, California, and the Southern Pacific, starting at its interchange in American Canyon, north through Napa, Sonoma, Mendocino and Humboldt counties to finally terminate in Eureka. As plans went forward it became clear that only one railroad would be profitable serving Mendocino and Humboldt Counties, so the Southern Pacific and Santa Fe entered into a joint agreement, and in 1906 merged 42 railroad companies between Marin and Humboldt Bay to create one railroad line stretching from Sausalito to Eureka.

Prior to completing the line to Eureka, operations over the southern portion of the Northwestern Pacific included daily freight trains #112 and #113 between Willits and Santa Rosa, train #133 between Santa Rosa and Tiburon, trains #153 and #154 between Petaluma and the Guerneville branch to Duncans Mills, train #102 between Glen Ellen and Tiburon, train #109 between Tiburon and Sausalito, train #145 over the narrow gauge between Occidental and San Anselmo, train #202 between Willits and Sherwood, and train #251 operating over the logging branches out of Sherwood. Passenger trains #131 and #132 ran between Sausalito and Willits, trains #21 and #22 between Sausalito and Ukiah, train #23 between Sausalito and Healdsburg, trains #17 and #20 between Sausalito and the Guerneville branch to Duncans Mills, trains #9, #10, and #14 between Sausalito and Glen Ellen, trains #6 and #7 between Sausalito and San Quentin, train #4 between Tiburon and San Rafael, train #92 over the narrow gauge between Sausalito and Cazadero, train #84 over the narrow gauge between Sausalito and Point Reyes, and #101, a mixed freight and passenger train operated on the Sebastopol branch. Sunday and holiday passenger trains often required two locomotives and sometimes two or more sections. Independence day traffic required borrowing 25 or 30 Southern Pacific coaches.

Completion of the line between Willits and Eureka was disrupted by the 1906 San Francisco earthquake; plans and right-of-way documents were destroyed in the subsequent fire. Engines 8, 12, 19, 104, 153 and 154 were shipped to Eureka by boat in 1911. After a time-expedient "punt" of the route through the unstable Eel River Canyon, construction was finally completed in October 1914 when a "golden spike" ceremony and celebration was held to mark the accomplishment.

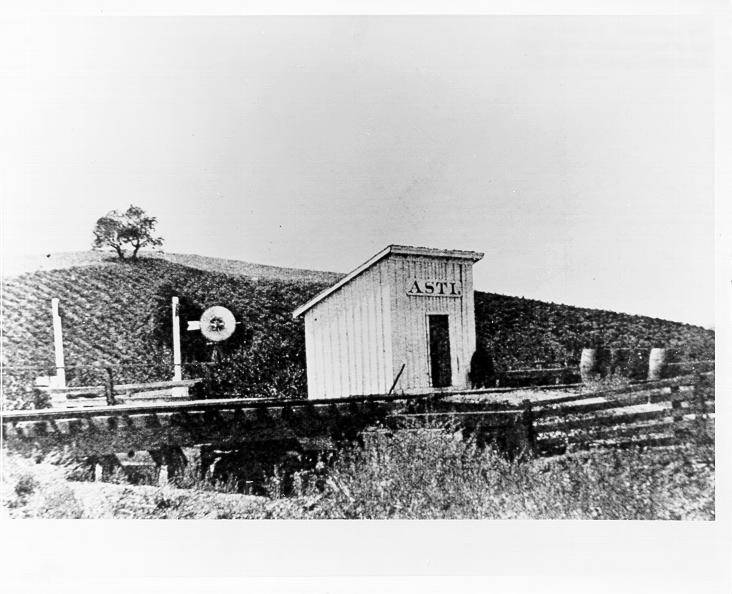
The depot at Asti

The railroad used ferries of San Francisco Bay for freight transfer until connected to the national rail network at Napa Junction by the Santa Rosa and Carquinez Railroad in 1888. The Santa Rosa and Carquinez remained part of SP independent of the NWP with a primary freight interchange at Schellville. SP's Santa Rosa branch continued from Schellville through Sonoma to a separate terminal yard on North Street in Santa Rosa. Freight interchange was predominantly through Ignacio, but there was a second connection to the SP in Santa Rosa until the line through the Valley of the Moon was abandoned in 1935.

The railroad service became popular; an early daily NWP timetable shows 10 passenger trains each way, plus dozens of freights. The rail line soon replaced steam schooners as the main means of getting lumber from Humboldt County to market. Rail service to inland areas facilitated local development of the lumber industry.

In 1929 the AT&SF sold its half-interest to the Southern Pacific, making the NWP a full SP subsidiary.

=== The SP era ===
Northwestern Pacific Railroad
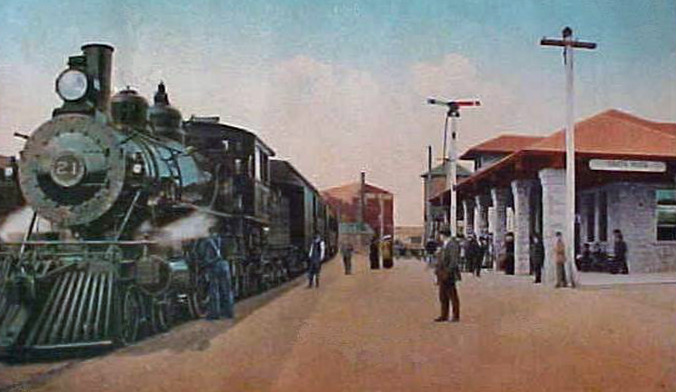
- Train at Santa Rosa, California in 1911

Overview
- Headquarters: Schellville, California - Operational; Palo Alto, California - Administrative
- Reporting mark: NWP
- Locale: California's North Coast from Marin County to Eureka
- Dates of operation: 1907–1998
- Successor: Southern Pacific Transportation Company; Eureka Southern Railroad

Technical
- Track gauge: 4 ft 8 1/2 in (1,435 mm) standard gauge
- Previous gauge: 80 miles (130 km) of system originally 3 ft (914 mm)
- Length: 271 miles (436 km)

Revenue freight traffic, in millions of net ton-miles (P&SR not incl)
Year	Traffic
1925	150
1944	348
1960	604
1970	421

Passenger service boomed until the 1930s, when improved roads and highways made traveling and shipping by motor vehicle more accessible. By 1935 freight and passenger service diminished because of the Great Depression. With the onset of World War II, freight shipments rose while passenger service remained constant. Freight service on the NWP increased in the 1950s owing to an increase in lumber demand due to the post-war housing boom.

Branch lines were dismantled during the 1930s. The Sebastopol branch became redundant following purchase of the Petaluma and Santa Rosa Railroad in 1932, and California State Route 12 adopted the former alignment between Leddy and Sebastopol. The Trinidad extension reverted to a logging line after NWP service ended in 1933. Sonoma County's River Road adopted the former alignment of the Guerneville branch from Fulton to Duncans Mills after rails were removed in 1935.

Diesels were being used on all trains by 1953, with the exception of ten-wheelers number 181 and 183 pulling passenger trains numbered 3 and 4 between San Rafael and Eureka with number 182 on standby. The #3/#4 trains offered sleeping cars, a cafe-lounge in addition to coach cars. Passengers from San Francisco would take Greyhound Buses from the San Francisco Ferry Building at the base of Market Street to San Rafael. NWP locomotives 112, 140, 141, 143, and 178 plus SP numbers 2345, 2356, 2564, 2582, and 2810 were stored at Tiburon for emergency use; but steam power had disappeared by 1955. On November 10, 1958, all mainline passenger service was discontinued south of Willits. The only remaining service was a tri-weekly Willits-Eureka round trip, operated by a single Budd Rail Diesel Car, which ran until April 30, 1971. When Amtrak took over intercity passenger rail service on May 1, 1971, it did not continue service on the NWP.

=== 1964 flood damage ===
The catastrophic Christmas flood of 1964 destroyed 100 miles (160 km) of the railroad in Northern California, including three bridges over the Eel River, and permanently changed the topography of the area. The line was closed for 177 days while 850 men rebuilt the railroad through the Eel River canyon. The line was reopened on 16 June 1965. In the years following the 1964 flood, the rail line was less reliable due to increased landsliding in the Eel River Canyon; but freight traffic remained high until the 1970s, as improvements to US Highway 101 cut hauling times, making trucking competitive with the rail line. An example of a 1970s work day on the NWP might look something like the following: During the final decade of Southern Pacific operation, carloads of lumber left Eureka each morning pulled by six EMD SD9 locomotives called "Cadillacs" by their crews. The train might pick up a refrigerator car of butter from Fernbridge and more lumber cars from Fortuna and Scotia before making a meal stop for its crew at the Fort Seward depot. More lumber cars might be added at Alderpoint during the long, gentle climb up the Eel River canyon. A second crew took over at Willits, where more cars from the California Western typically swelled the train to approximately one hundred cars. Five miles (8 km) of 2.25 percent grade from Willits to Ridge originally required helpers, but six "Cadillacs" typically moved the train from Willits to Ridge in two sections during later years. The remaining trip down the Russian River to Schellville included a meal stop for the crew at Geyserville.

=== 1978 tunnel fire ===
Many Humboldt County mills began shipping lumber in trucks when a fire caused collapse of the Island Mountain tunnel, or tunnel 27, closing the line north of Willits on 6 September 1978, and only half of that traffic returned to the rails when the line reopened on 10 December 1979. Remaining traffic revenues were insufficient for track maintenance through the Eel River Canyon, at that time the most expensive stretch of rail line in the United States. In September 1983, the SP announced that it was shutting down the maintenance-intensive NWP line north of Willits. This led to a contentious court battle since the SP did not properly notify the Interstate Commerce Commission of their intent to abandon the line. The line was ordered reopened by the U.S. Circuit Court in March 1984.

=== Sales and shortline development ===
From the late 1960s into the 1980s the SP began substantially cutting back non-core routes. Trains stopped running to Tiburon in 1967 and the railroad gave the land to the town. In 1971, the line from Sausalito, once a major terminal on the line, was abandoned and converted into the Mill Valley / Sausalito Pathway connecting to similar trails throughout Marin built upon the former interurban lines.

In 1984, the SP sold the north end from Willits to Eureka to Bryan Whipple, who ran it as the Eureka Southern Railroad under the reporting marks EUKA. The Eureka Southern operated freight trains and revamped tourist train service until bankrupted by storm damage in the Eel River Canyon, selling the railroad and most equipment by 1992.

Between 1984 and 1989, the former Petaluma and Santa Rosa Railroad mainline from Santa Rosa to Sebastopol was abandoned by the Southern Pacific, subsequently acquired by the Sonoma County Parks Department and converted into the Joe Rodota Trail for walking and biking.

=== North Coast Railroad Authority (1989–2022) ===
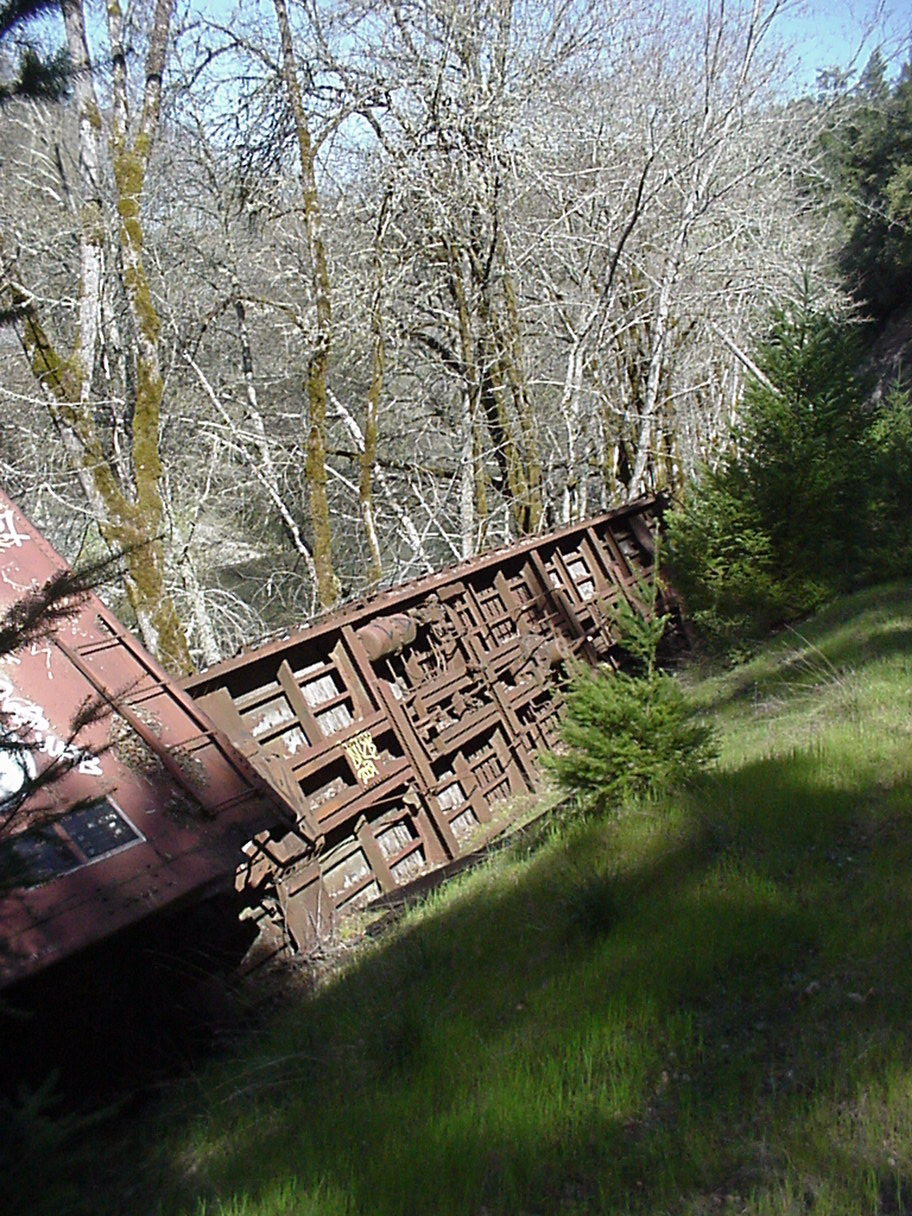
Derailed boxcars remain adjacent to Outlet Creek at milepost 152 near Longvale.

The California Legislature formed the North Coast Railroad Authority (NCRA) in 1989 to save the NWP from total abandonment. NCRA purchased the Eureka Southern in 1992 and leased the line to the newly formed North Coast Railroad In late 1996, severe flooding of the Eel River led to widespread landslide damage and destruction of roadbed which remained unrepaired and halted most service. A lack of capital along with previous customers now finding the railroad expensive and unreliable after switching to truck traffic made repairs difficult to finance and complete. The Federal Railroad Administration (FRA) prohibited any train operation north of Willits in 1998. This order was amended in 1999 to allow the connecting California Western Railroad to resume operation to Willits Depot and turn trains on the wye at Willits Yard after agreeing to assist in the maintenance of the same.

Beginning in the late 1990s, the Golden Gate Bridge, Highway and Transportation District began purchasing sections of the NWP's south end from the Southern Pacific to save for a potential commuter train route thanks to growing suburbs in Marin and Sonoma counties. The SP required the California Northern Railroad (CFNR) to take over freight operations on the NWP in 1993 as a part of their long-term lease agreements for their main stretch of trackage in the Napa, Fairfield, and Woodland areas. The CFNR generally operated one train from Willits to Hopland, where freight cars were transferred to a second train from Hopland to Schellville. The track from Lombard to Healdsburg was owned by the precursor to SMART, and the CFNR had trackage rights granted from Schellville to Willits where interchange occurred with the North Coast Railroad and the California Western Railroad.

When the CFNR lease of the NWP was terminated, the NCRA via a contractor took over operations using EMD GP9 and SD9 locomotives painted in the SP "Black Widow" colors running both freight service and occasional passenger excursion service from 1996 to 1998. The line was plagued by a series of harsh El Nino storms from 1997 to 1998 causing significant washouts and bridge instability on top of already deferred infrastructure maintenance and mismanagement. The six EMD locomotives, defaulted on their lease, were returned to their lessor Omni-Trax in early 1998 and replaced by SP SD9s leased from Diesel Motive Company (reporting mark BUGX) and former North Coast Railroad GP9s owned by the NCRA. Maintenance and repair orders by the Federal Railroad Administration that were not addressed ultimately led the FRA to shut down all operations over the entire length of the line on November 22, 1998, under Emergency Order 21, the first and only time it had ever done so until the 2023 shutdown of the Blackwell Northern Railroad. The six EMD locomotives, defaulted on their lease, were returned to their lessor Omni-trax in 1998. Former SP SD9s, leased from Diesel Motive Company (reporting mark BUGX), and former North Coast Railroad GP9s, owned by the NCRA, were then pressed into short-lived service before additional washouts, mechanical failures, and low revenue again closed the line. By 2016, several movements including scrapping of former equipment in Eureka and returning of leased and privately stored equipment in Willits, Petaluma and Schellville had begun.

In January 2001, the NWP briefly resumed service between Schellville and Cotati using three leased locomotives with reporting mark "NWPY", but service was discontinued in September 2001 because the operator lacked capital to continue operations. Except for the brief SMART hy-rail inspection trip and few speeder tours, the line lay dormant and out of service until 2007.

=== SMART and NWPco (2002–2024) ===
By 2002, the GGBHTD has purchased most of the "South End" and formed the "SMART District" to oversee funding and potential future operations. In November 2006, Measure R was passed with a combined 65.3% "yes" vote in the two-county District but ultimately failed to meet the "2/3 supermajority." In 2008, Measure Q passed providing funding for the construction of a commuter railroad through a quarter-cent sales tax. Though it was thought that this would provide enough initial funding, it did not. Consequently, the railroad would be constructed in stages over several years.

In 2009, SMART began initial electrical work on the line which was paralleled by reballasting and replacement of bad ties between Schellville and Windsor. In 2006, NCRA awarded a 99-year lease to the Northwestern Pacific Railroad Company, NWPco, who would operate trains under reporting mark "NWP." In June 2011, the line was reopened for freight traffic and operations began between Schellville and Windsor, California, 62 miles, with the first freight train delivering grain to Petaluma in July. Trains on the NWP ran from the Lombard interchange with the California Northern Railroad, as far north as Windsor with most traffic occurring in Petaluma. The railroad predominantly carries grain for dairy and poultry farms in Sonoma County, but also has provided shipment of lumber products out of Windsor, Petaluma and Schellville, a large piece of equipment for Pacific Gas and Electric, construction trains for SMART, bulk car storage, and currently hosts the Golden Gate Railroad Museum storage lot on a former lumber yard spur in Schellville.

Regular passenger trains operated by SMART began in late Spring 2017 between Sonoma County Airport and San Rafael, later opening the Larkspur station with a connection to the Larkspur ferry landing. While SMART will eventually extend commuter service to at least Cloverdale, NCRA and NWPco had plans to open the line to the Skunk Train connection and major yard facility in Willits, but no timeline was established or attempts made before NCRA was dissolved, and as of 2024 there is little public interest by SMART. Both agencies' plans were dependent on state and federal grants, and the success of the SMART train. Although tourist companies along with local historical groups have expressed interest in possibly opening an excursion and dinner train that would traverse Humboldt and Arcata bays, there are no plans to reopen the Eel River Canyon segment.

=== Disbanding of the NCRA, and SMART Freight (2019 – present) ===
Financial disarray and legal troubles beginning before the turn of the millennium caused the NCRA to fall out of favor with local and state officials as well as the public. In 2020, the SB 69 Great Redwood Trail Act was passed, tasked with dissolving the NCRA and the creation of a 320-mile public trail. California's 2018 Great Redwood Trail Act includes detailed plans for investigating and resolving the Authority's debts, dissolving the NCRA, and converting its rights-of-way to rail-trail. Additionally in the bill, the Sonoma–Marin Area Rail Transit (SMART) acquired 21 miles (34 km) from Healdsburg north to the Mendocino-Sonoma County border in September 2020.

In February 2022, SMART took over NWP freight operations by purchasing NWPco's freight rights and equipment for $4 million, having been approved by the US Surface Transportation Board, and briefly subcontracted freight operations back to NWPco for several months before taking it over completely. Today, freight service is operated by "SMART Freight", and continues to use locomotives previously both owned and leased by NWPco, now by SMART, in various "Northwestern Pacific" themed schemes.

== Predecessor lines ==
Valuation map of the Northwestern Pacific railroad

- California Midland Railroad extended the Eel River and Eureka Railroad up the Van Duzen River to Carlotta, and was merged into SF&NW in 1903.
- California Northwestern Railway formed in 1898 for Southern Pacific Railroad to assume control of the SF&NP and extend the line from Ukiah to Willits in 1902. An extension was built from Willits to Sherwood in 1904. Merged into NWP in 1907.
- California and Northern Railway was formed by Santa Fe Railroad to build north from Eureka to Arcata in 1901, and was merged into SF&NW in 1904.
- Cloverdale and Ukiah Railroad extended the SF&NP from Cloverdale to Ukiah in 1889.
- Eel River and Eureka Railroad connected Humboldt Bay with the Eel River town of Fortuna in 1884, and was merged into SF&NW in 1903.
- Fort Bragg and Southeastern Railroad formed in 1905 for Santa Fe Railroad to assume control of the isolated 24-mile (39 km) Albion River Railroad built in 1891. Merged into NWP in 1907, but never connected to the remainder of the NWP system.
- Fulton and Guerneville Railroad constructed the 15-mile (24 km) SF&NP branch from Fulton to Guerneville in 1877.
- Marin and Napa Railroad extended the Sonoma Valley narrow-gauge 8 miles (13 km) from Sears Point to connect with the SF&NP at Ignacio in 1888.
- North Pacific Coast Railroad built a 3 ft narrow gauge line from Sausalito via the Tomales Bay coast to the Russian River in 1876. Became North Shore Railroad in 1902.
- North Shore Railroad formed to assume control of the North Pacific Coast narrow-gauge in 1902. Merged into NWP in 1907.
- Oregon and Eureka Railroad was formed in 1903 for Southern Pacific Railroad to assume control of logging lines around Arcata at the north end of Humboldt Bay. Selected lines to Trinidad were merged into Northwestern Pacific in 1911. The Trinidad extension reverted to Hammond Lumber Company control in 1933 and operated as logging branches of the Humboldt Northern Railway until 1948.
- Pacific Lumber Company built 7 miles (11 km) of track in 1885 to connect their mill at Scotia with the Eel River and Eureka Railroad at Alton. Branch lines were subsequently built up the Eel River; and these lines merged into SF&NW in 1903.
- Petaluma and Haystack Railroad built from Petaluma to Haystack Landing on the Petaluma River in 1864. Purchased by SF&NP in 1876.
- San Francisco and Eureka Railway formed by Southern Pacific Railroad in 1903 to build a connection from Willits to Eureka. Merged into NWP in 1907.
- San Francisco and North Pacific Railroad (SF&NP) built from Donahue landing on the Petaluma River to Santa Rosa in 1870 and extended to Cloverdale in 1872. Extended from Petaluma to San Rafael in 1879. Extended from San Rafael to Tiburon by the San Francisco & San Rafael in 1884. Extended from Cloverdale to Ukiah by the Cloverdale & Ukiah in 1889. Merged in NWP in 1907.
- San Francisco and Northwestern Railway (SF&NW) formed by Santa Fe Railroad in 1903 to consolidate the California and Northern Railway from Arcata to Eureka, the Eel River and Eureka Railroad from Eureka to Alton, The California Midland from Alton to Carlotta, and the Pacific Lumber Company lines from Alton up the Eel River. Merged into NWP in 1907.
- San Francisco and San Rafael Railroad extended the SF&NP from San Rafael to Tiburon in 1884.
- San Rafael and San Quentin Railroad (SRSQ) was a narrow-gauge railroad formed on 25 February 1869 to connect a ferry landing at Point San Quentin with San Rafael.
- Santa Rosa, Sebastopol and Green Valley Railroad built the 6-mile (9.7 km) SF&NP branch from Santa Rosa to Sebastopol in 1890.
- Sonoma and Santa Rosa Railroad extended the Sonoma Valley narrow-gauge from Sonoma to Glen Ellen in 1882.
- Sonoma Valley Prismoidal Railway was an early wooden monorail that was to be built from Petaluma River landing 5 miles (8.0 km) to Schellville in 1876. However, only the segment from Norfolk landing (later called Wingo) on Sonoma Creek was ever completed. The line ceased operations in May 1877 and was converted to the narrow-gauge Sonoma Valley Railroad beginning in 1878.
- Sonoma Valley Railroad purchased Sonoma Valley Prismoidal Railway in 1878, converted it to a conventional 3 ft (914 mm) narrow-gauge, and extended it into Sonoma in 1879. Extended from Sonoma to Glen Ellen by the Sonoma & Glen Ellen in 1882. Extended from Sears Point landing to rail connection at Ignacio by Marin & Napa in 1888.

== Route ==
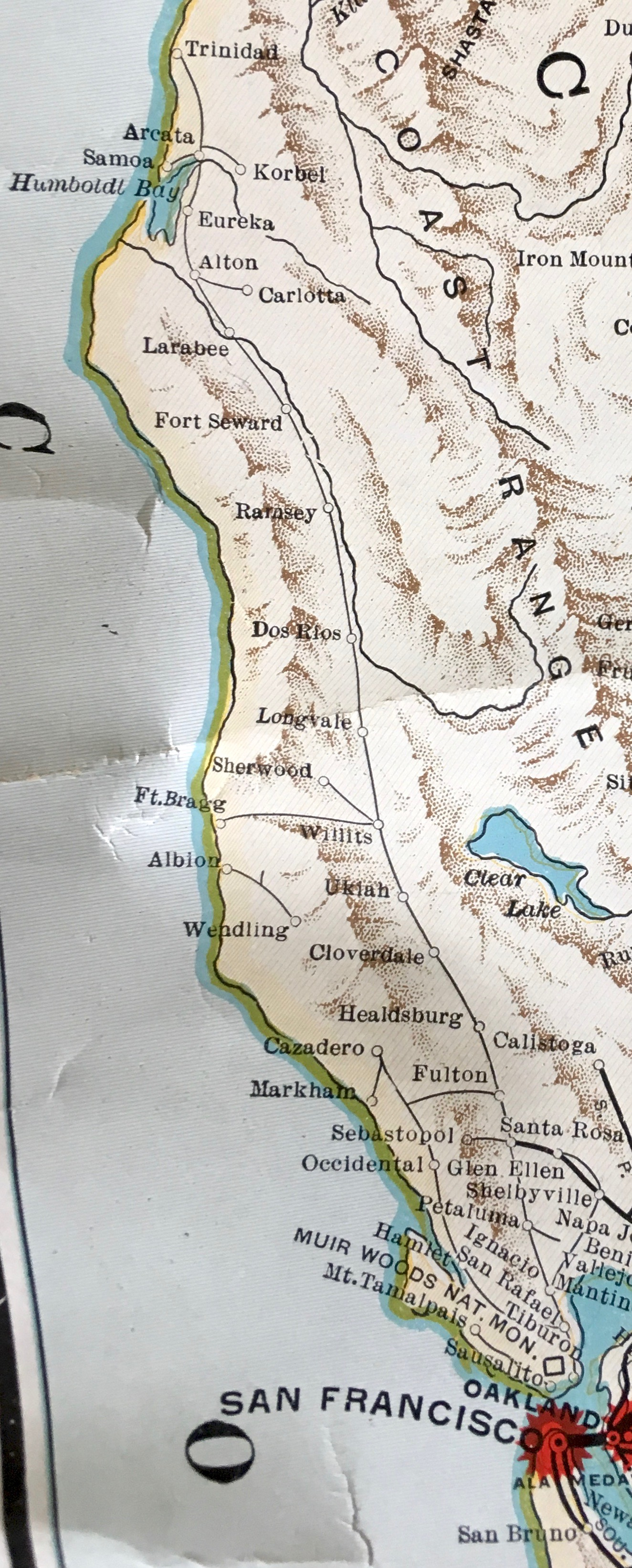
Northwestern Pacific Railroad Route in 1931

NWP mileposts conform to Southern Pacific Railroad convention of distance from San Francisco:

- Milepost 40.4 – Schellville (formerly junction with Santa Rosa and Carquinez Railroad)
- Milepost 28.7 – Black Point bridge over Petaluma River
- Milepost 25.8 – Ignacio junction with San Rafael branch
- Milepost 27.8 – Novato
- Milepost 37.2 – Haystack bridge over Petaluma River
- Milepost 38.5 – Petaluma
- Milepost 46.1 – Cotati
- Milepost 53.8 – Santa Rosa
- Milepost 58.5 – Fulton (formerly junction with Guerneville branch)
- Milepost 62.9 – Windsor (Currently the northernmost operational and open point on NWP)
- Milepost 67.6 – bridge over Russian River
- Milepost 68 – Healdsburg
- Milepost 75.8 – Geyserville
- Milepost 85.2 – Cloverdale
- Milepost 100.1 – Hopland
- Milepost 114 – Ukiah
- Milepost 120 – Calpella
- Milepost 122.1 – Redwood Valley
- Milepost 131.4 – Ridge summit between Russian River and Eel River drainages is highest point on line
- Milepost 139.5 – Willits interchange with (formerly Union Lumber Company) California Western Railroad (AKA Skunk Train), which is still operational as a tourist line. A reconnection is planned, but as of late 2022, no timetable for this is in place.
- Milepost 166.5 – line enters Eel River Canyon at Dos Rios
- Milpost 194.8 – bridge over Eel River at south entrance of Island Mountain tunnel
- Milepost 206.5 – bridge over Eel River
- Milepost 209 – Alderpoint
- Milepost 237.7 – South Fork bridge over Eel River
- Milepost 255.6 – Scotia (formerly interchange with Pacific Lumber Company)
- Milepost 261.8 – bridge over Van Duzen River
- Milepost 262.7 – Alton junction with Carlotta Branch
- Milepost 266.1 – Fortuna
- Milepost 271 – Loleta
- Milepost 284.1 – Eureka
- Milepost 292.5 – Arcata
- Milepost 295.2 – Korblex (formerly interchange with Northern Redwood Company Arcata and Mad River Railroad)
- Milepost 300.5 – Samoa (formerly interchange with Hammond Lumber Company Humboldt Northern Railway)

== Narrow-gauge line ==
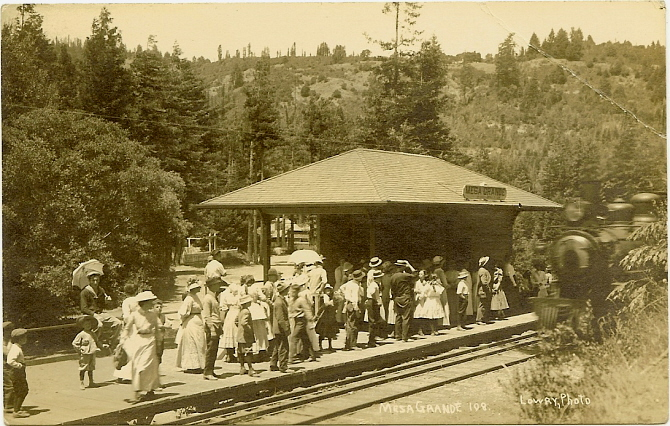
Mesa Grande station was served by dual-gauge track.

The NWP 3 ft (914 mm) narrow-gauge line was built as the North Pacific Coast Railroad in 1873 from a San Francisco ferry connection at Sausalito to the Russian River at Monte Rio. Rails were extended downriver to Duncans Mills in 1876, and up Austin Creek to Cazadero in 1886. This narrow-gauge line became the Shore Division of the NWP formed by Santa Fe and Southern Pacific in 1907. Freight traffic was heavy as the lower Russian River valley was a major source of redwood lumber for rebuilding San Francisco after the 1906 San Francisco earthquake. The NWP narrow-gauge obtained additional freight cars from the South Pacific Coast Railroad (SPC) as the SPC was converted to standard gauge between 1907 and 1909. Ferries Lagunitas, Ukiah, and Sausalito carried narrow-gauge freight cars across San Francisco Bay from Sausalito to the dual-gauge San Francisco Belt Railroad.

After the flooded Russian River destroyed the 4 ft 8 1/2 in (1,435 mm) standard gauge NWP Guerneville branch bridge at Bohemia on 19 March 1907, NWP rebuilt the bridge one-half mile downriver; and extended the Guerneville branch from Monte Rio to Duncans Mills as dual-gauge by 1909. Redwood lumber was then shipped out over the Guerneville branch. A freight transfer shed was built at San Anselmo station so narrow-gauge tracks could be removed from the ferries in 1910; and more than half of the narrow-gauge freight cars were scrapped by 1912. A daily freight train operated from Occidental to San Anselmo in the morning and returned to Occidental in the afternoon. The train included a coach for Sonoma County students attending school in Tomales. A freight engine stationed at Duncans Mills was operated by the Guerneville branch freight crew as needed to bring infrequent freight down from Cazadero for transfer to the Guerneville branch until the line up Austin Creek to Cazadero was standard-gauged in 1926.

Summer tourists from San Francisco still visited Russian River vacation spots via joint narrow-gauge/standard-gauge NWP "triangle" excursions until 1927 when automobile travel became more popular. Standard-gauging of the southern end of the line from San Francisco Bay to Point Reyes Station at the head of Tomales Bay was completed on 5 April 1920. Freight service between Point Reyes Station and Occidental was reduced to thrice weekly with freight transfer at Point Reyes Station. Lumber production from the lower Russian River valley was ended by a wildfire on 17 September 1923. After the standard-gauge line was extended to Cazadero, service north of Point Reyes was reduced to a daily (except Sunday) mixed train to Camp Meeker and return until the last narrow-gauge train ran on 29 March 1930; and the remaining narrow-gauge line between Monte Rio and Point Reyes Station was dismantled that autumn. The route of the dual-gauge line from Fulton to Duncan Mills later became the popular River Road connecting all the towns from the coast to the central county.

=== Route ===
Mileposts conform to Southern Pacific Railroad convention of distance from San Francisco.

- Milepost 6.5 – Sausalito
- Milepost 11.7 – tunnel 1
- Milepost 12.6 – Corte Madera
- Milepost 13.4 – Larkspur
- Milepost 14.7 – Kentfield
- Milepost 16.5 – Junction later known as San Anselmo
- Milepost 18.3 – Fairfax
- Milepost 20.7 – tunnel 2
- Milepost 23.1 – Nicasio
- Milepost 27 – bridge over Paper Mill Creek and highway (former hamlet of Taylorville)
- Milepost 35.6 – Arroyo San Geronimo trestle
- Milepost 36.4 – Point Reyes Station
- Milepost 45.4 – Marshall
- Milepost 50.5 – bridge over Keyes Creek
- Milepost 51.9 – tunnel 3
- Milepost 53.1 – Tomales
- Milepost 53.7 – tunnel 4
- Milepost 54.9 – Stemple Creek trestle
- Milepost 58.8 – Estero Americano Creek trestle
- Milepost 59.5 – Valley Ford
- Milepost 61.9 – Ebabias Creek trestle
- Milepost 62.2 – Bodega Road crossing
- Milepost 62.7 – Salmon Creek trestle
- Milepost 63.7 – Freestone
- Milepost 65.2 – Salmon Creek trestle
- Milepost 66.9 – Brown Creek trestle (this 142-foot (43 m) high trestle was reputedly the highest of its kind in the United States when built in 1876)
- Milepost 67.6 – Occidental
- Milepost 68.7 – Maquire Creek trestle
- Milepost 69.0 – Camp Meeker
- Milepost 70.5 – Larry Creek trestle
- Milepost 70.8 – bridge over Dutch Bill Creek
- Milepost 71 – tunnel 5
- Milepost 71.6 – bridge over Dutch Bill Creek
- Milepost 71.7 – bridge over highway
- Milepost 73.8 – Monte Rio
- Milepost 77 – bridge over Russian River
- Milepost 77.1 – Duncans Mills
- Milepost 82.1 – bridge over Austin Creek
- Milepost 84.3 – Cazadero The D.H. McEwen Lumber Company operated narrow gauge 2-cylinder Shay locomotive C/N 1823 at Cazadero briefly beginning in 1906.

=== Locomotives ===
Number	Builder	Type	Date	Works number	Notes
82	Baldwin Locomotive Works	4-4-0	1876	3842	ex-NPC/NS/NWP #11 scrapped 1911
83	Baldwin Locomotive Works	4-4-0	1875	3722	ex-NPC/NS/NWP #3 scrapped 1913
84	NPC Sausalito Shop	4-4-0	1900	1	ex-NPC/NS/NWP #20; used in passenger service between Sausalito and Point Reyes; retired 1920 scrapped 1924
85	Baldwin Locomotive Works	4-4-0	1884	7249	ex-South Pacific Coast Railroad #14 wrecked
86	Baldwin Locomotive Works	4-4-0	1884	7236	ex-South Pacific Coast Railroad #15 then NWP #19>#86 sold Duncan Mills Land & Lumber Company 1920 scrapped 1926
87	Baldwin Locomotive Works	4-4-0	1880	4960	ex-South Pacific Coast Railroad #10 then NWP #10>#87 scrapped 1917
90	Brooks Locomotive Works	4-4-0	1891	1886	ex-NPC/NS/NWP #15 operated last narrow gauge NWP train in 1930 scrapped 1935
91	Brooks Locomotive Works	4-4-0	1894	2421	ex-NPC/NS/NWP #16 scrapped 1935
92	Brooks Locomotive Works	4-4-0	1891	1885	ex-NPC/NS/NWP #14; used in passenger service between Sausalito and Cazadero; retired 1926; scrapped 1935
93	Baldwin Locomotive Works	4-4-0	1884	7249	1924 rebuild of wrecked #85 scrapped 1935
94	Baldwin Locomotive Works	4-6-0	1887	8486	ex-South Pacific Coast Railroad #20 then NWP #21>#144>#94 scrapped 1935
95	Brooks Locomotive Works	4-6-0	1899	3418	ex-NPC/NS/NWP #18 then NWP #145>#95 retired 1929 scrapped 1935
195	Baldwin Locomotive Works	2-6-0	1883	6611	ex-NPC/NS/NWP #13 scrapped 1912
321	Baldwin Locomotive Works	2-8-0	1880	4974	ex-Denver and Rio Grande Railroad #44 then NS/NWP #40 scrapped 1912
322	Baldwin Locomotive Works	2-8-0	1885	7676	ex-Hancock and Calumet Railroad #2 then Duluth, South Shore and Atlantic Railroad #33 then NS/NWP #33 scrapped 1914
323	Baldwin Locomotive Works	2-8-0	1885	7677	ex-Hancock and Calumet Railroad #3 then Duluth, South Shore and Atlantic Railroad #31 then NS/NWP #31 scrapped 1912

== See also ==
- List of U.S. Class I railroads
- Sonoma–Marin Area Rail Transit, a commuter line using the Northwestern Pacific's former right-of-way
- Eureka Southern Railroad
- North Coast Railroad
- Arcata and Mad River Railroad
- California Western Railroad
- List of Northwestern Pacific Railroad locomotives
