= Eureka Southern Railroad =

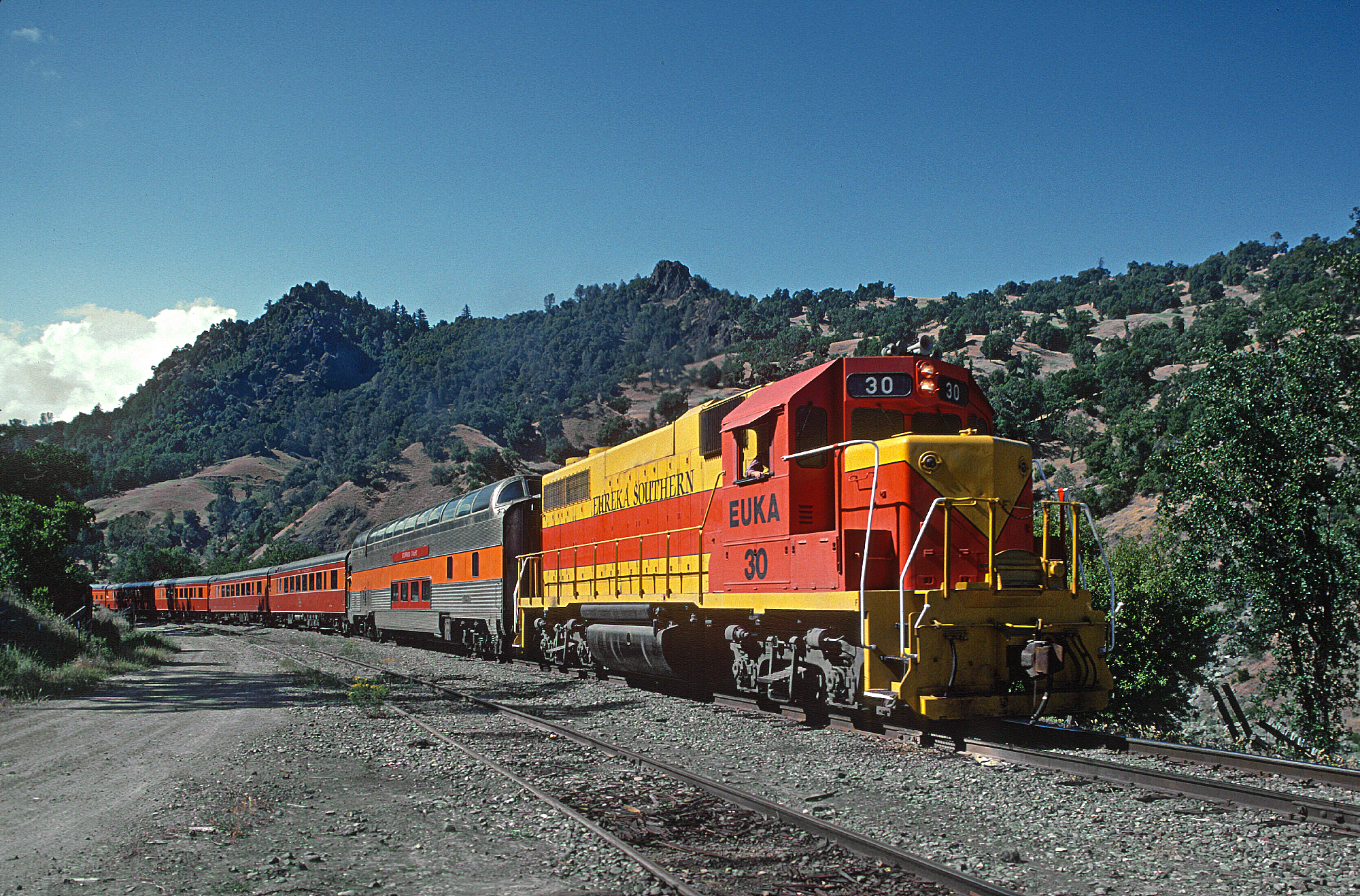
- The North Coast Daylight in 1985

Overview
- Termini: Willits, California; Eureka, California

Service
- Type: Shortline freight and excursion railroad

History
- Opened: 1 November 1984
- Closed: 1991

Technical
- Track gauge: 4 ft 8 1/2 in (1,435 mm)

The Eureka Southern Railroad (reporting mark EUKA) was a shortline freight and excursion railroad that ran over former Northwestern Pacific trackage in California from Willits to Eureka.

== Origin ==
On September 8, 1981, Bryan Whipple purchased the soon-to-be abandoned northern end of the Northwestern Pacific mainline from Willits, California to Eureka, California. His Eureka Southern Railroad holding company purchased the segment of the line from the Southern Pacific Railroad for $5 million (equivalent to $18 million in 2025), and commenced operations on November 1, 1984. The company began service with rented Southern Pacific locomotives, then acquired four new locomotives.

Over the course of its life, the line struggled to make money. Though wood products had historically been the top source of revenue for the Northwestern Pacific and subsequently the Eureka Southern, historic overharvest on private lands limited timber availability, and coupled with rising environmental restrictions in the area caused traffic numbers to fall consistently. The Eureka Southern also faced a constant battle with the elements in the Eel River Canyon, historically one of the most expensive to maintain stretches of track in the United States. On December 15, 1986, the road filed for Chapter 11 bankruptcy, but continued operations.

== North Coast Daylight ==
The line operated an excursion train, the "North Coast Daylight", as a joint venture with Sierra Western Corp., the owners of historic passenger cars. Several of the cars had originally been Southern Pacific Daylight cars; others were a hodge-podge of vintage passenger, diner, and dome cars of the same era, painted in the iconic "Daylight" orange-striped scheme. The trains were pulled by Eureka Southern locomotives.

On Saturday mornings, the "North Coast Daylight" passengers rode excursion buses from the San Francisco Bay area to Willits, where they boarded the train. The train followed the scenic Eel River Valley north to Eureka (a route never served by the original Southern Pacific Daylight trains). Passengers stayed overnight in Eureka, then boarded again on Sunday mornings for the return trip to Willits and (by bus) to the Bay Area. The cars were unheated, air conditioning often failed, and meals often were late. The vintage rail car toilets emptied their contents onto the tracks below, and passengers were asked not to flush while the train was stopped in the stations at Willits and Eureka. Frequent slow orders due to washouts, bad track, derailments and other challenges frequently made the trains behind schedule.

The North Coast Daylight was never financially stable, and operation was interrupted several times by reorganizations and damaged tracks. The service lasted, off and on, from about 1985 through 1990. The vintage cars were used for some limited excursion service on the 1996-1998 reiteration of the Northwestern Pacific on the south end (Willits to Schellville), but were "marooned" in various places across the system including Willits, Cloverdale and Healdsburg after the 1998 Emergency Order 21 by the Federal Railroad Administration, which shut down the entire line. Several of the cars were sold and moved by trucks and later by the reopened NWP throughout the late 2000s and 2010s.

In September 1988 the ES purchased the 7-mile (11 km) shortline Arcata and Mad River Railroad from Simpson Timber Company for $300,000. The A&MR had been closed for the two-year period prior to its purchase by the Eureka Southern.

== Closure ==
In 1991, the line was shut down due to an earthquake and related landslide that caused expensive washouts. The railroad was then sold at court order to the North Coast Railroad Authority in 1992, as a protection by local government agencies to ensure continued railroad service to the counties. The line was renamed the North Coast Railroad, and consisted of many former employees of the Eureka Southern. The North Coast Railroad continued to run "North Coast Daylight" trains into the mid-1990s, using the same passenger cars. The EUKA GP38 locomotives were not included in the sale, so the NCRA used a mixture of leased Southern Pacific GP9s and SD9s, as well as a purchased former Central California Traction Railroad GP9, #70. Faced with constant washouts, derailments, unreliable schedules and a dwindling customer base, operations shut down in 1995 and have not reopened. The Eel River canyon segment of trackage, faced with two decades of no repair, is in some places nonexistent. Most of the locomotives ended up marooned on the line in Eureka, and were scrapped in the fall of 2024 after sitting idle for over 25 years, with #70 having been scrapped in 2015. Experts who surveyed the trackage in the late 2000s estimated a $20 million price tag to bring the line up to FRA minimal operating standards. The NCRA denied plans to abandon the line, but has not mentioned any plans to resume operations from Willits north. Many freight cars still dot the line, including four boxcars still in the river from a 1987 derailment and a string of flatcars trapped at Island Mountain.

In 2022, the NCRA was reorganized by legislation into the Great Redwood Trail, a hiking, walking and biking path that will traverse the same ROW of the NWP.
