= List of Northwestern Pacific Railroad locomotives =

The Northwestern Pacific Railroad was formed by merging several smaller railroads and forest railways of northern California into a single line northward from San Francisco Bay through the California Coast Ranges to Humboldt Bay. These railroads were built to move lumber to the national rail network from northern California coastal forests. The merged railroad was initially jointly owned by the Southern Pacific Railroad and Atchison, Topeka and Santa Fe Railway using a wide variety of locomotives from previous owners. Freight trains were pulled by ten-wheelers while eight-wheelers pulled passenger trains. A few of the newer locomotives survived while trains were increasingly pulled by Southern Pacific locomotives after Southern Pacific assumed control of the railroad in 1929.

== Steam locomotives ==
Number	Builder	Type	Date	Works number	Notes
1	Baldwin Locomotive Works	4-4-0	1884	7400	ex-Eel River and Eureka Railroad #2 then San Francisco and Northwestern Railway #2 retired in 1916
2	Baldwin Locomotive Works	4-4-0	1883	7013	ex-Eel River and Eureka Railroad #1 then San Francisco and Northwestern Railway #1 retired in 1920
3	Baldwin Locomotive Works	4-4-0	1887	8947	ex-Los Angeles County Railroad #3 then Eureka and Klamath River Railroad #6 then Oregon and Eureka Railroad #6 retired in 1923
4	Norris Locomotive Works	4-4-0	1862	1009	ex-San Francisco and San Jose Railroad #2 then San Francisco and North Pacific Railroad #1; used in passenger service between Tiburon and San Rafael; retired 1920
5	Booth	4-4-0	1873	17	ex-San Francisco and North Pacific Railroad #5 scrapped 1911
6	Booth	4-4-0	1870	14	ex-San Francisco and North Pacific Railroad #2; used in passenger service between Sausalito and San Quentin; destroyed by boiler explosion 1915
7	Booth	4-4-0	1870	15	ex-San Francisco and North Pacific Railroad #3; used in passenger service between Sausalito and San Quentin; retired 1920
8	Baldwin Locomotive Works	4-4-0	1881	5485	ex-San Francisco and North Pacific Railroad #8; shipped to Eureka in 1911 for construction through the Eel River canyon; retired 1925
9	Grant Locomotive Works	4-4-0	1883	1664	ex-San Francisco and North Pacific Railroad #9; used in passenger service between Sausalito and Glen Ellen; reboilered 1917 retired 1938
10	Grant Locomotive Works	4-4-0	1883	1665	ex-San Francisco and North Pacific Railroad #10; used in passenger service between Sausalito and Glen Ellen; reboilered 1917 scrapped 1937
11	Grant Locomotive Works	4-4-0	1878		ex-San Francisco and North Pacific Railroad #6 scrapped 1912
12	Grant Locomotive Works	4-4-0	1878		ex-San Francisco and North Pacific Railroad #7; shipped to Eureka in 1911 for construction through the Eel River canyon; retired 1926
13	Baldwin Locomotive Works	4-4-0	1875	3831	ex-Santa Fe Railroad #07 then San Francisco and Northwestern Railway retired 1929
14	Grant Locomotive Works	4-4-0	1888		ex-San Francisco and North Pacific Railroad #14; used in passenger service between Sausalito and Glen Ellen; reboilered 1915 retired 1926
15	Baldwin Locomotive Works	4-4-0	1878	4416	ex-New Mexico and Southern Pacific Railroad #203>#503 then Santa Fe Railroad #103>#049 then San Francisco and Northwestern Railway #7 scrapped 1930
16	Pennsylvania Railroad	4-4-0	1886	1031	ex-Pennsylvania Railroad #452 then Chicago, St. Louis and Pittsburgh Railroad #452 then Pittsburgh, Cincinnati, Chicago and St. Louis Railroad #8298>#298>#343 then Pacific Lumber Company #3 then Eel River and Eureka Railroad#4 then San Francisco and Northwestern Railway #4 retired 1930
17	Rogers Locomotive Works	4-4-0	1889	4155	ex-San Francisco and North Pacific Railroad #17; used in passenger service between Sausalito and Duncan Mills; scrapped 1935
18	Rogers Locomotive Works	4-4-0	1889	4154	ex-San Francisco and North Pacific Railroad #16 wrecked 1910
19	Rogers Locomotive Works	4-4-0	1884	3305	ex-San Francisco and North Pacific Railroad #12; shipped to Eureka in 1911 for construction through the Eel River canyon; reboilered 1917 scrapped 1937
20	Rogers Locomotive Works	4-4-0	1884	3306	ex-San Francisco and North Pacific Railroad #13; used in passenger service between Sausalito and Duncan Mills; reboilered ~1916 retired ~1932
21	Baldwin Locomotive Works	4-4-0	1904	24035	ex-San Francisco and North Pacific Railroad #24; used in passenger service between Sausalito and Ukiah; scrapped 1937
22-23	American Locomotive Company	4-4-0	1908	44959-44960	used in passenger service between Sausalito and Ukiah; scrapped 1938 and 1949
51-54	American Locomotive Company	4-4-0	1914	54580-54583	scrapped 1938
99	E. Jardine	0-4-0T	1887		purchased by San Francisco and North Pacific Railroad 1898 sold 1910 North Bend Lumber Company
101	Rogers Locomotive Works	4-6-0	1889	4212	ex-San Francisco and North Pacific Railroad #18; used on the mixed train between Santa Rosa and Sebastopol; scrapped 1928
102	Grant Locomotive Works	4-6-0	1888		ex-San Francisco and North Pacific Railroad #15; used in freight service between Tiburon and Glen Ellen; retired 1929
103	Richmond Locomotive Works	4-6-0	1901	3304	ex-San Francisco and North Pacific Railroad #20 scrapped 1935
104	Richmond Locomotive Works	4-6-0	1901	3303	ex-California Northwestern Railway #31; shipped to Eureka in 1911 for construction through the Eel River canyon; scrapped 1936
105	American Locomotive Company	4-6-0	1902	25620	ex-San Francisco and North Pacific Railroad #21 scrapped 1934
106	American Locomotive Company	4-6-0	1902	25621	ex-California Northwestern Railway #32 then San Francisco and North Pacific Railroad #25 scrapped 1934
107-108	Baldwin Locomotive Works	4-6-0	1904	23933 & 23951	ex-San Francisco and North Pacific Railroad #22-23 scrapped 1937 & 1948
109	Baldwin Locomotive Works	4-6-0	1900	18179	ex-California Northwestern Railroad #30; used in freight service between Tiburon and Sausalito; scrapped 1948
110	Baldwin Locomotive Works	4-6-0	1900	17759	ex-San Francisco and North Pacific Railroad #19 scrapped 1937
111-114	American Locomotive Company	4-6-0	1908	44955-44958	used for freight service between Willits and Santa Rosa; #112 retired in 1962, preserved California State Railroad Museum #114 wrecked 1946 #111 & 113 scrapped 1949 and 1947
130-133	American Locomotive Company	4-6-0	1910	49089-49092	initially used in passenger service between Sausalito and Willits; scrapped 1938
134-135	American Locomotive Company	4-6-0	1912	51536-51537	scrapped 1940
136-141	American Locomotive Company	4-6-0	1914	54578-54579 & 54975-54978	scrapped 1940-57
142-143	Baldwin Locomotive Works	4-6-0	1922	55356 & 55473	scrapped 1953
170-172	Baldwin Locomotive Works	4-6-0	1907	30105-30106 & 31094	ex-Las Vegas and Tonopah Railroad #4, #5 & #8 purchased 1918 scrapped 1946-1950
178	Baldwin Locomotive Works	4-6-0	1906	29726	ex-Bullfrog Goldfield #13 > #11 purchased 1917 scrapped 1954
179	American Locomotive Company	4-6-0	1907	44753	ex-Las Vegas and Tonopah Railroad #12 purchased 1917 scrapped 1952
180-181	American Locomotive Company	4-6-0	1914	54979-54980	renumbered from #160-161 1918 scrapped 1952–1955
182-184	Baldwin Locomotive Works	4-6-0	1922	55351 & 55470-55471	#184 destroyed in Scotia Bluffs slide 1953 – others scrapped 1955
201-202	Baldwin Locomotive Works	2-6-2T	1903	22446 & 22474	ex-California Northwestern Railway #33-34 tenders added 1910; used in freight service on the Sherwood branch until #202 was shipped to Albion; scrapped 1930–1937
225	H. K. Porter, Inc	2-4-2T	1887	905	ex-National City and Otay Railroad #5 then Fort Bragg and Southeastern Railroad #1 scrapped 1937
226	Hinkley Locomotive Works	0-6-0	1880		ex-Santa Fe Railroad #122>#2232 then Fort Bragg and Southeastern Railroad #2 scrapped 1910
227-228	American Locomotive Company	0-6-0	1910	48037-48038	scrapped 1948–1949
229-231	American Locomotive Company	0-6-0	1914	54981-54983	scrapped 1948–1950
251	Lima Locomotive Works	Shay locomotive	21 September 1904	909	ex-Northwestern Redwood Company #1 then California Northwestern Railway 2nd #32; leased to Northwestern Redwood Company of Willits, California; leased to Portland, Eugene and Eastern Railroad; sold 1935 to Washington construction firm
255	Heisler	Heisler	1912	1254	ex-Jordan River Lumber Company #7 then Horseshoe Lumber Company #7 purchased 1922 sold Shaw Bertram Lumber Company 1924
300	Cooke Locomotive Works	2-6-0	1901	2624	ex-Southern Pacific Railroad #2140>#1714 leased 1929 retired 1934
301	Cooke Locomotive Works	2-6-0	1901	2626	ex-Southern Pacific Railroad #2142>#1716 leased 1929 retired 1934
351	Baldwin Locomotive Works	2-6-0	1887	8776	ex-Eel River and Eureka Railroad #3 then San Francisco and Northwestern Railway #3 renumbered from #151 1914 scrapped 1916
352	Baldwin Locomotive Works	2-6-0	1886	8092	ex-Gulf, Colorado and Santa Fe Railroad #65>#314 then Santa Fe Railroad #0179 then San Francisco and Northwestern Railway #5 renumbered from #152 1914 scrapped 1929
353-354	American Locomotive Company	2-6-0	1908	45284-45285	renumbered from #153-154 1914 scrapped 1935
