= Oregon and Eureka Railroad =

Overview
- Headquarters: Samoa, California
- Locale: Humboldt County, California
- Dates of operation: 1875–1948

Technical
- Track gauge: 4 ft 8 1/2 in (1,435 mm) standard gauge

Southern Pacific Transportation Company formed the Oregon and Eureka Railroad Company in 1903 in an agreement to use logging railroads as part of a line connecting Humboldt County (California) sawmills with the national rail network. Northwestern Pacific Railroad offered service over the route from 1911 through 1933. The northern 6-mile (9.7 km) of the line remained in use as a Hammond Lumber Company logging branch until 1948.

== History ==
John Vance built a sawmill near the Mad River community of Essex, in 1875, with a railroad to transport lumber from the sawmill to Mad River Slough on Humboldt Bay for loading onto ships. This Humboldt and Mad River Railroad had three locomotives and connected with paddle-wheel steamboats from Eureka, California, at Mad River Slough. Vance constructed a new sawmill in Samoa, California, in 1893, and extended his railroad both north and south to bring logs from Lindsay Creek to the Samoa sawmill. The railroad was incorporated as the Eureka and Klamath River Railroad in 1896. Andrew Hammond purchased the railroad and sawmill on 30 August 1900.

The 36-mile (58 km) Oregon and Eureka Railroad formed through Hammond's 1903 agreement with Southern Pacific was equipped with seven locomotives, two 48-foot (15 m) passenger coaches, and 166 freight cars. The railroad had 212 freight cars by 1905, and was extended in 1906 to carry lumber from the Little River Redwood Company sawmill at Crannell, California. The Oregon and Eureka was included in the Northwestern Pacific Railroad (NWP) merger on 8 January 1907, and extended to Trinidad, California on 22 June.

Northwestern Pacific trains began operating to Trinidad on 1 July 1911. Hammond Lumber Company was formed in 1912 using some of the Oregon and Eureka rolling stock on logging branches off the former Oregon and Eureka main line. Hammond merged with the Little River Redwood Company on 24 February 1931. Northwestern Pacific ended service to Trinidad on 1 March 1933; and dismantled the line between Korblex and Little River Junction. The southern end of the line linked the Samoa mill complex to the national rail network for another half century. NWP sold the line north of Little River Junction back to Hammond Lumber Company. Hammond extended logging branches northward toward Big Lagoon until a 1945 wildfire destroyed many of the trestles. The last logging train ran on 23 August 1948.

== Route ==
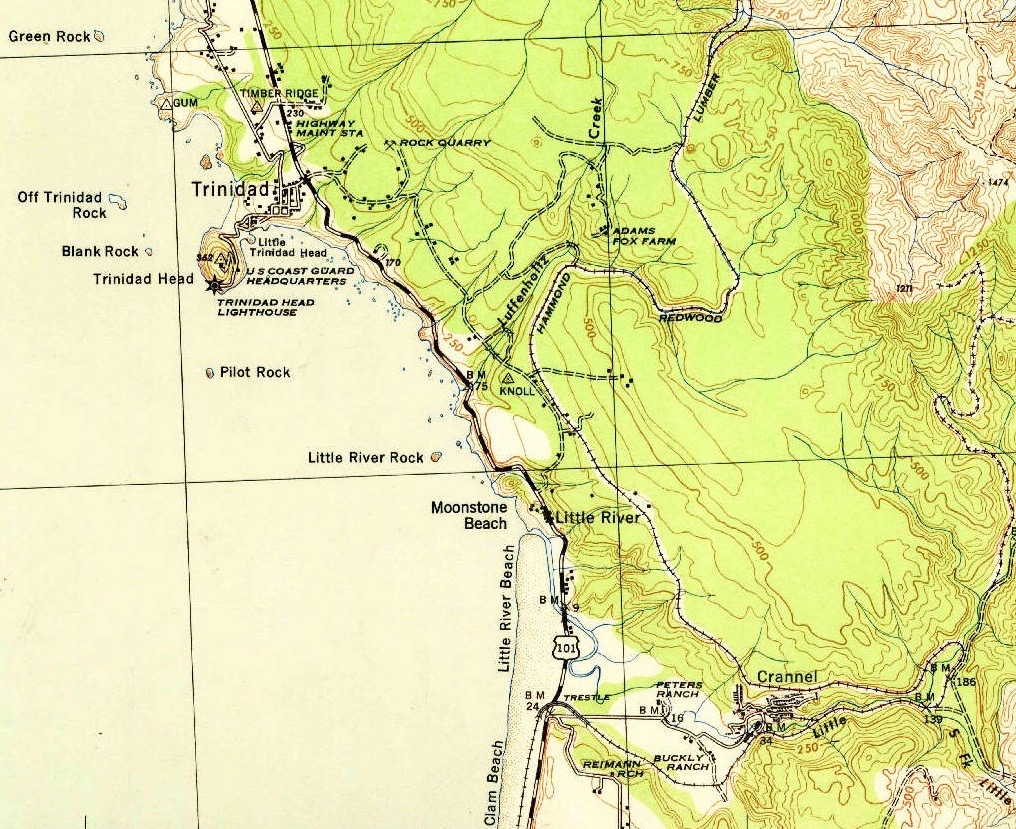
Northern portion of route in 1945

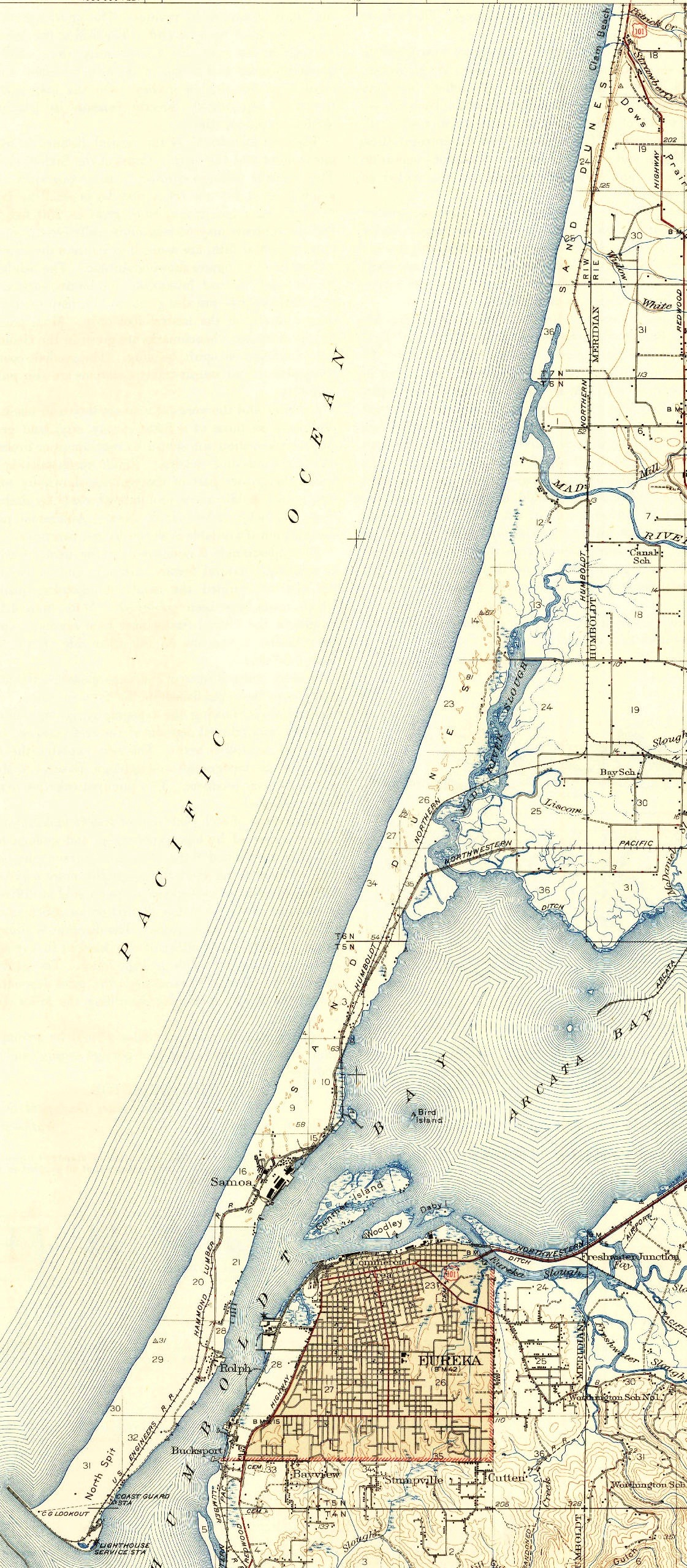
Southern portion of route in 1942

- Milepost 0 – Samoa
- Milepost 1 – Samoa Yard
- Milepost 1.3 – Carsons
- Milepost 2 – Humboldt Northern Railroad crossing
- Milepost 4 – Manila
- Milepost 6 – Daniels
- Milepost 7.5 – Arcata
- Milepost 8.5 – Normal Junction (to Eureka, California)
- Milepost 9.5 – Janes Creek
- Milepost 11 – Korblex, California
- Milepost 11.5 – Minor Junction
- Milepost 11.9 – McCloskey (water tank)
- Milepost 12 – Englehart
- Milepost 12.5 – Essex (4-stall roundhouse and turntable built in 1898 and dismantled in 1920)
- Milepost 13 – Shingle Mill
- Milepost 14 – Dairy
- Milepost 15 – Thompsons
- Milepost 16 – Carsons No. 2
- Milepost 17 – Fieldbrook
- Milepost 17.5 – Camp 5
- Milepost 20 – Little River Junction (to connection at Camp 9 with Humboldt Northern logging railroad from Samoa) (water tank)
- Milepost 21 – Crannell
- Milepost 22 – Cole Spur
- Milepost 22.5 – Camp 10
- Milepost 23 – Moonstone
- Milepost 24 – Luffenholtz (2-stall roundhouse built in 1904 burned in 1906)
- Milepost 24.5 – Kalstrom's Siding
- Milepost 25 – 25 Junction (with Hammond Lumber Company branches toward Big Lagoon) (water tank)
- Milepost 26 – Dead Man
- Milepost 26.5 – Culbert
- Milepost 27.5 – Trinidad (2-stall roundhouse and turntable built in 1913 and dismantled in 1924)

== Oregon and Eureka locomotives ==
Number	Builder	Type	Date	Works number	Notes
1	Baldwin Locomotive Works	0-6-0	1875	3751	named Advance on Humboldt and Mad River Railroad; became Eureka and Klamath River Railroad #1; scrapped after 1900
2	Globe Iron Works	0-4-0 Tank locomotive			named Gypsy on Humboldt and Mad River Railroad; became Eureka and Klamath River Railroad #2; then Oregon and Eureka Railroad #2
3	Baldwin Locomotive Works	2-6-0	1883	6711	named Onward on Humboldt and Mad River Railroad; became Eureka and Klamath River Railroad #3; then Oregon and Eureka Railroad #3
4	Baldwin Locomotive Works	2-6-0	1896	14738	built as Eureka and Klamath River Railroad #4; named Challenger; became Oregon and Eureka Railroad #4
5	Baldwin Locomotive Works	2-6-0	1897	15283	built as Eureka and Klamath River Railroad #5; named Potawa; became Oregon and Eureka Railroad #5
6	Baldwin Locomotive Works	4-4-0	1887	8947	formerly Flanigan, Brosnan & Company #3, purchased 1900 as Eureka and Klamath River Railroad #6; became Oregon and Eureka Railroad #6; then Northwestern Pacific Railroad #3
7	Pittsburgh Locomotive and Car Works	4-4-0			purchased 1901 as Eureka and Klamath River Railroad #7; became Oregon and Eureka Railroad #7
8	Grant Locomotive Works	2-6-0	before 1896		purchased 1903 as Oregon and Eureka Railroad #8; rebuilt by Hammond at Samoa in 1910; became Hammond Lumber Company #8 in 1911
9	Grant Locomotive Works	2-6-0	before 1896		purchased 1903 as Oregon and Eureka Railroad #9; became Hammond Lumber Company #9 in 1911
10	Cooke Locomotive and Machine Works	4-4-0	1886	1720	purchased 1901 as Eureka and Klamath River Railroad #10; became Oregon and Eureka Railroad #10; sold 1905 as Rogue River Valley #3
11	Samoa	2-8-0	1910		built in Hammond's Samoa shops in 1910 as Oregon and Eureka Railroad #11; became Hammond Lumber Company #11 in 1911

== Additional Hammond Lumber Company locomotives used during NWP operation ==
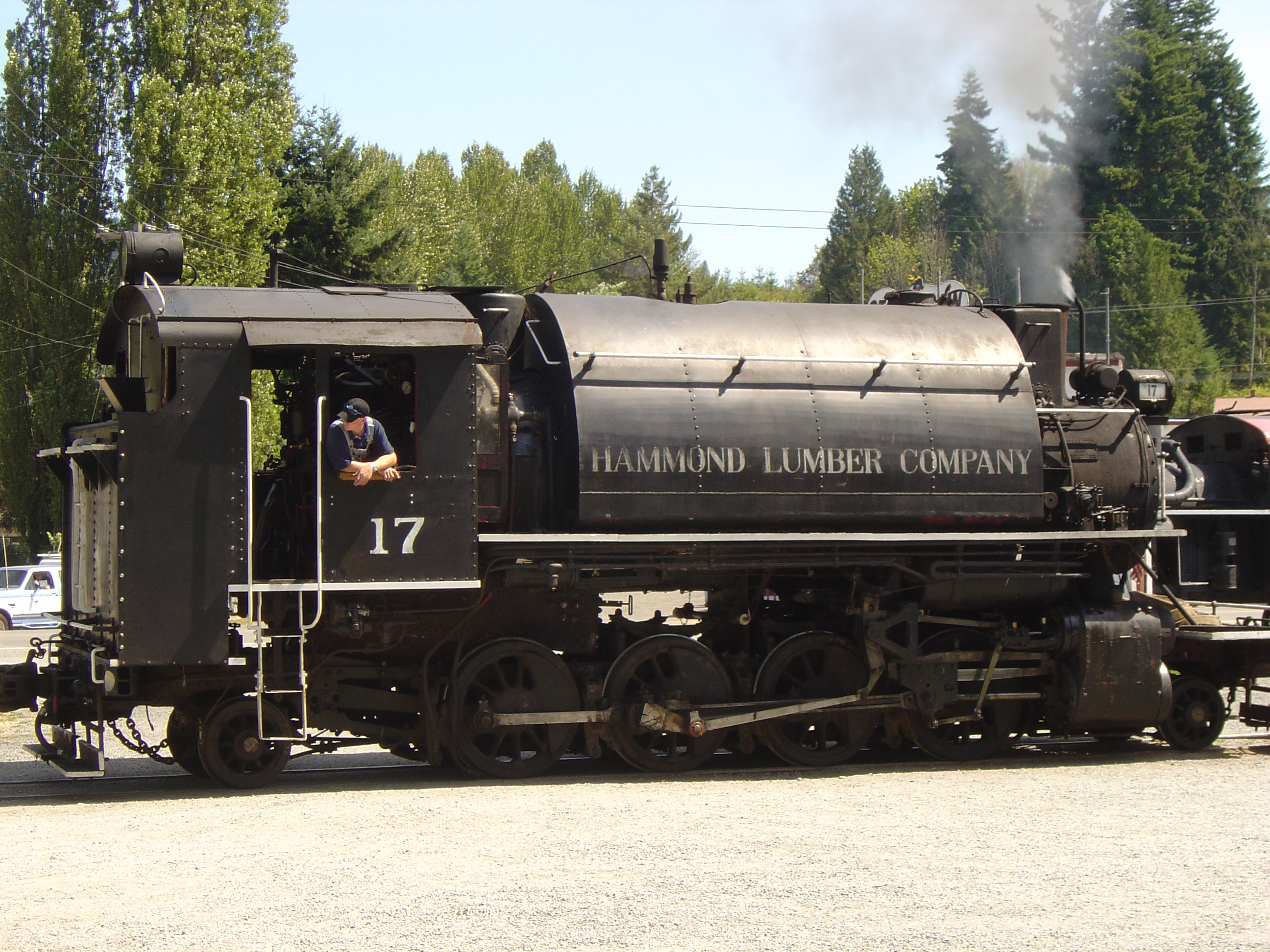
Hammond Lumber Company No. 17 was restored after being abandoned in the woods following a 1945 wildfire.

Number	Builder	Type	Date	Works number	Notes
1	Lima Locomotive Works	Shay locomotive	19 October 1907	1952	originally Little River Redwood Company #1; sold to Pacific Lumber Company for parts in 1942
2	Lima Locomotive Works	Shay locomotive	26 April 1913	2636	originally Little River Redwood Company #2; scrapped in 1948
4	Lima Locomotive Works	Shay locomotive	5 June 1922	3172	originally Little River Redwood Company #4; sold 1935 to Camino, Placerville and Lake Tahoe Railroad as #2; placed on display at Griffith Park Travel Town Museum in 1955
5	Lima Locomotive Works	Shay locomotive	27 April 1923	3209	originally Little River Redwood Company #5; scrapped 1948
	Baldwin Locomotive Works	4-6-0	~1890	9298	Built for the Colorado Midland Railroad; operated as California Western Railroad #36 after 1918; purchased by Little River Redwood Company in 1929
12	Baldwin Locomotive Works	2-6-6-2 Tank locomotive	1929	60870	Built as Hammond Lumber Company #6 for service in Mill City, Oregon; moved to Samoa and renumbered in 1931; sold as Arcata and Mad River Railroad #12 in 1951; sold 1956 and has recently been on display in Flagstaff, Arizona
13	Baldwin Locomotive Works	2-6-6-2 Tank locomotive	1929	60871	Built as Hammond Lumber Company #5 for service in Mill City, Oregon; moved to Samoa and renumbered in 1931; sold to Crown Willamette in 1937
15	Baldwin Locomotive Works	2-8-2	1916		originally Humbird Lumber Company #4 of Sandpoint, Idaho; became Hammond Lumber Company #15 in 1941; put on display in Eureka, California's Sequoia Park in 1960
16	American Locomotive Company	2-8-2 Tank locomotive	February 1929	67652	built for Crossett Western Company in Oregon; purchased as Hammond Lumber Company #16 in 1943; placed on display in Fortuna, California in 1964; recently operational on the Chelatchie Prairie Railroad
17	American Locomotive Company	2-8-2 Tank locomotive	September 1929	68057	built for Crossett Western Company in Oregon; purchased as Hammond Lumber Company #17 in 1942; isolated in the woods north of Crannell by burned out trestles in 1945; restored at Klamath, California in 1966; recently operational on the Mount Rainier Scenic Railroad
31	Lima Locomotive Works	Shay locomotive	10 July 1920	3087	built as Hammond Lumber Company #31; leased to Union Lumber Company of Fort Bragg, California from 1936 to 1940; scrapped in 1948
32	Lima Locomotive Works	Shay locomotive	5 February 1921	3157	built as Hammond Lumber Company #32; scrapped in 1948
33	Lima Locomotive Works	Shay locomotive	3 July 1922	3180	built as Hammond Lumber Company #33; sold to Pickering Lumber Company in 1944; preserved by Northern Counties Logging Interpretive Association
