= Arcata and Mad River Railroad =

First working railroad in California (1854–1983)

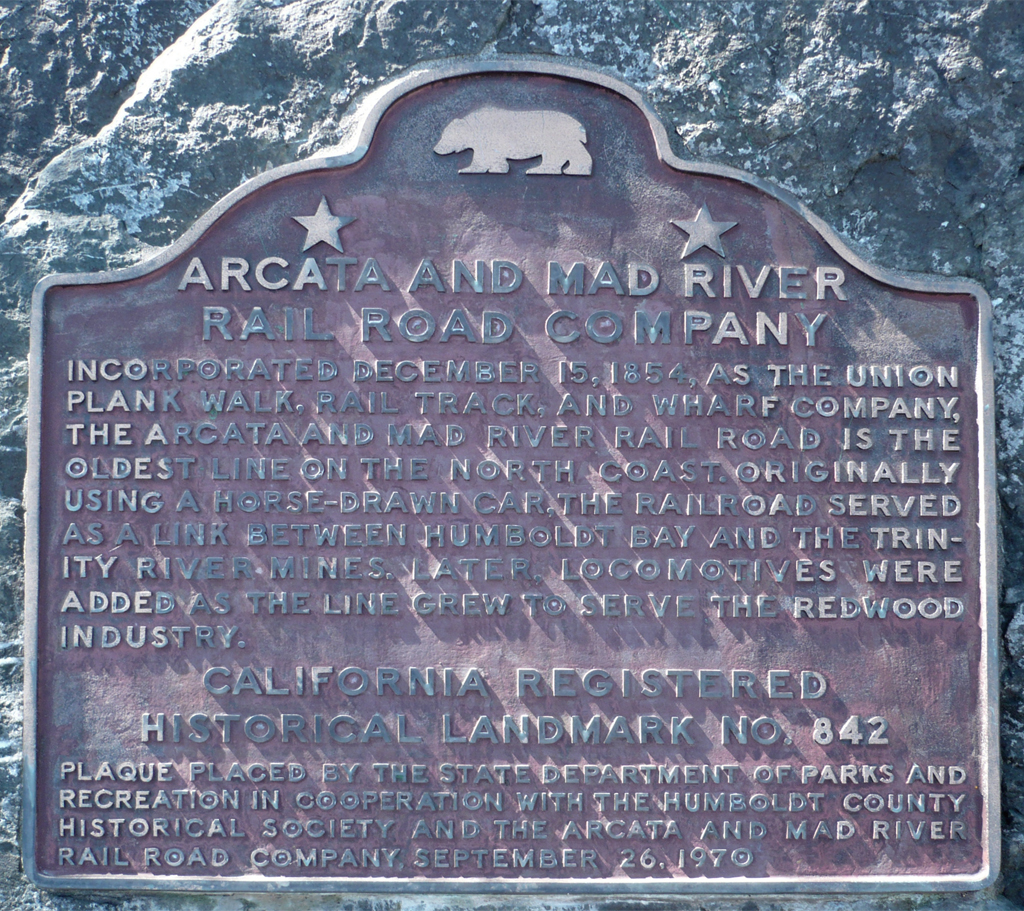

Overview
- Headquarters: Arcata, California
- Reporting mark: AMR
- Locale: Redwood Empire
- Dates of operation: 1854–1983

Technical
- Track gauge: 4 ft 8 1/2 in (1,435 mm) standard gauge
- Previous gauge: 3 ft 9 1/2 in (1,156 mm)

Other

California Historical Landmark
- Reference no.: 842

The Arcata and Mad River Railroad (reporting mark AMR), founded in 1854, was the oldest working railroad in California. It operated on a unique narrow gauge until the 1940s when standard gauge rails were laid. Service ceased in 1983 due to landslides. It is California Historical Landmark #842.

== History ==
=== Union Wharf companies ===
On December 15, 1854, the Union Wharf and Plank Walk Company built a pier into Humboldt Bay near Arcata to load lumber schooners. The wooden rails overlain with strap iron laid on that walkway were built to an unusual narrow gauge of 3 ft 9 1/2 in (1,156 mm) apart. A year later, 2 miles (3.2 km) of track had been laid leading up to the wharf. A horse drew the cars across the narrow gauge rail tracks.

This line was the oldest working railroad in California because while the Sacramento Valley Railroad filed papers of incorporation in 1853, they did not begin construction until 1855, after this line was operational. In 1875, the railroad was renamed the Union Plank Walk and Railroad Company. The wooden rails were faced with iron and a small steam locomotive, named the Black Diamond towed lumber out onto the pier from the 1872 Dolly Varden mill owned by Isaac Minor.

=== Arcata Transportation Company ===
Twenty-three years later, on June 15, 1878, the railroad was reorganized as the Arcata Transportation Company. The old side-wheel steamer, the Gussie McAlpine was replaced by a sternwheeler, named the Alta and the company kept adding track to local mills. In 1881 the Arcata and Mad River Railroad assumed control of the old line. Over the next two years, they replaced strap iron rail with 35-pound-per-yard (17.4 kg/m) T-rail and extended the rails further upstream on the Mad River until they reached the town of North Fork now Korbel and the Humboldt Lumber Mill owned by the Korbel brothers. Due to the initials of the line, it was nicknamed the "Annie and Mary."

=== Arcata and Mad River Railroad Company ===
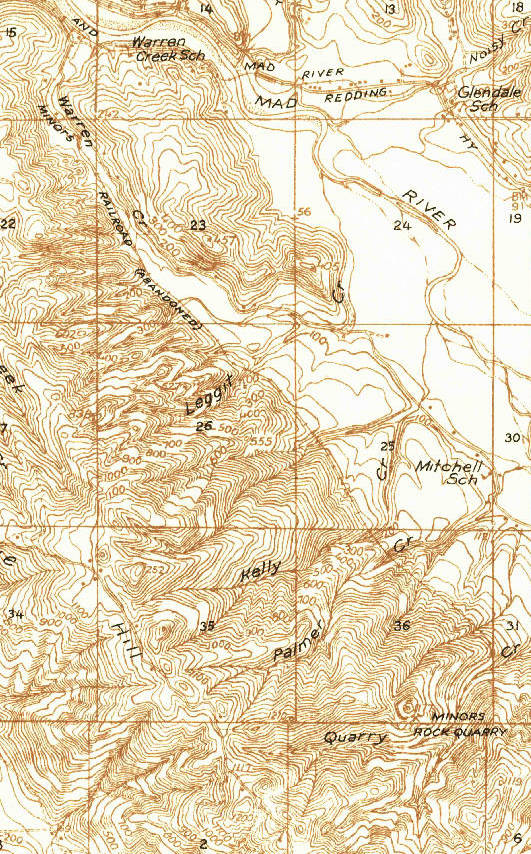
1933 map showing the abandoned Minor RR line

In 1883, the Korbel family bought the line which had about 27 miles (43 km) of track split between common carrier lines and private logging track. The Korbels organized the company on December 29, 1891, as the Arcata and Mad River Railroad Company. In the late 1880s, the A&MR line carried lumber for the (Isaac) Minor Mill and Lumber Company of Glendale. In 1890, the A&MR engines included Arcata, North Fork, Eureka and Blue Lake as well as a small engine named Gypsy; by the early 1900s, a new Baldwin 1901 engine named the Hoopa was added.

In 1896 the line carried 24,752 passengers and 6,475 short tons (5,781 long tons; 5,874 t) of freight from four saw mills and two shingle mills. Passenger revenue on the line was about 28 percent of freight revenue.

In March 1896 an E&ERRR construction train failed to stop and collided with a passenger train. The first known Humboldt County railroad accident with injuries occurred on September 13, 1896, when seven people were killed and 23 injured by a train falling through the Mad River truss bridge. Lawsuits relating to the fatal accident were filed against the Korbels but were unsuccessful.

Construction of the California and Northern Rail line between Arcata and Eureka in 1901 put the Alta out of business. Two years later the Humboldt Lumber Mill and the A&MR were bought by the Riverside Lumber Company and the Charles Nelson Steamship Company who reinforced the wharf for use by any locomotive instead of just the lightweight engine formerly used.

=== 20th century ===
After owner Francis Korbel returned to his home city of Prague, the company sold out to the Northern Redwood Lumber Company.

On October 23, 1914, the region was linked to the San Francisco Bay Area for the first time by the completion of the Northwestern Pacific Railroad (NWP) which also assumed control of the California and Northern. The NWP consolidated about half of the Humboldt County rail lines.

In 1925, the logging rail gauge and the Heisler locomotives were changed to 4 ft 8 1/2 in (1,435 mm) standard gauge, although the original narrow gauge remained until the closing of the Korbel Riverside mill rendered it redundant. The next series of changes resulted in removing old track and building new in the 1940s when all the old track was gone and standard gauge for 7.5-mile (12.1 km) was installed.

On 3 June 1954 the railroad celebrated its centennial with an excursion for 300 Humboldt County residents plus 338 railfans from Oregon, Arizona, New Mexico, and distant parts of California. Locomotive number 12 pulled a baggage car and nine Southern Pacific San Francisco commuter coaches from Arcata to Korbel, where the passengers transferred to seven flatcars pulled by Shay locomotive number 5 to Camp 9.

Lumber boomed again in the 1950s, the A&MR served fifteen shippers on its 7.5-mile (12.1 km) railroad. In 1956 the Simpson Logging Company purchased the Northern Redwood Lumber Company operations, which included the A&MR. The average daily car loadings were enough to place the road among the highest paying railroad properties per mile in the United States. At the time of its closure, AMR ran 4 General Electric 44-tonner diesel-electric locomotives (#101-#104) and one Whitcomb 80DE-7b 80 ton diesel-electric locomotive.

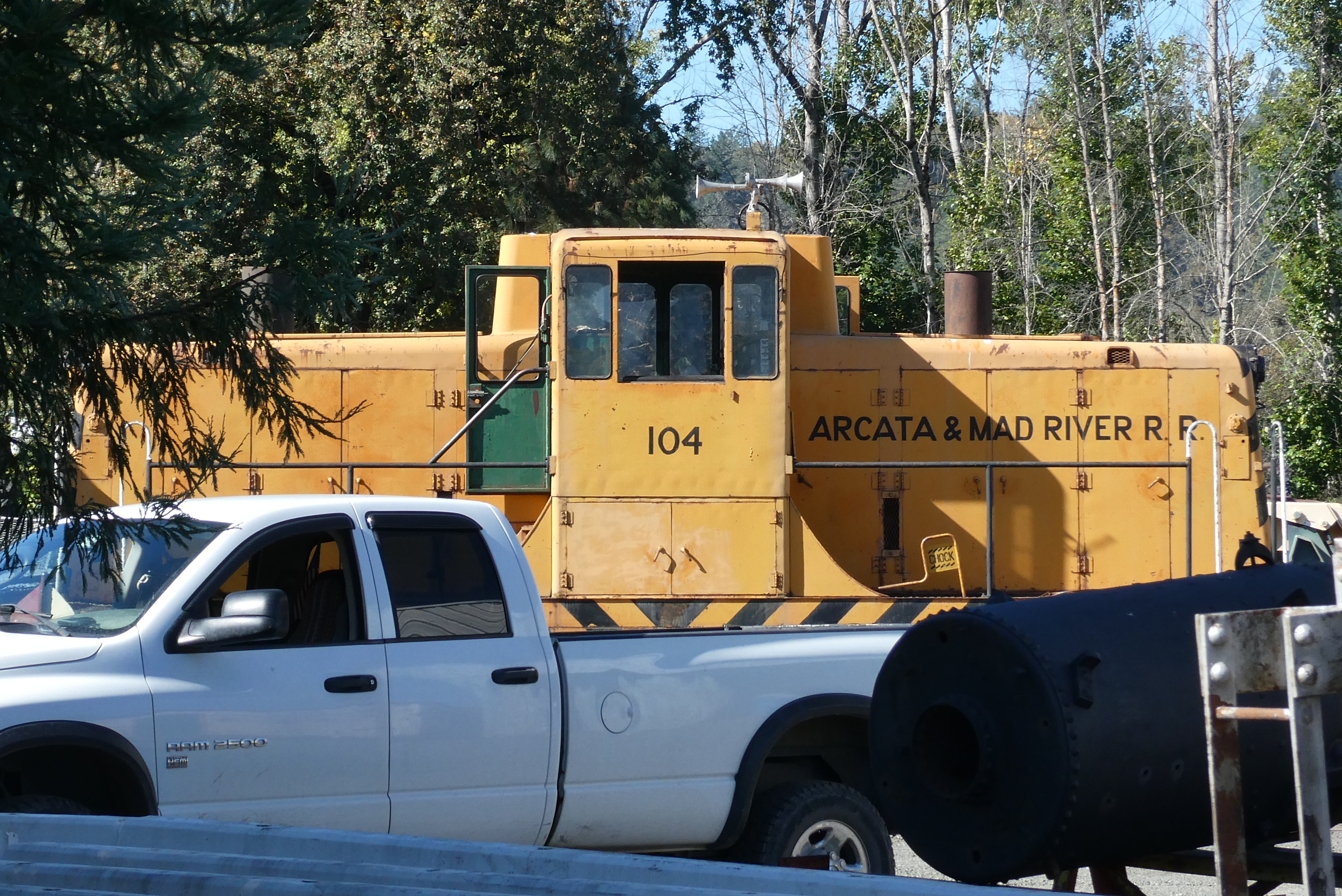
Locomotive #104 preserved at Roots of Motive Power in Willits

During the 1950s, shipments from Blue Lake included regular cars from the Levitt Brothers own lumberyard and nail factory from which lumber and nails were sent to the four Levittown developments in the eastern U.S.

In the winter of 1982–83, storms washed out the main NWP line in several places. After restoring service to Eureka in June 1983, the NWP charged a surcharge of $1,200 per car (equivalent to $3,879 in 2025) in and out of the area. Due to the landslides and the surcharges, shippers switched to diesel trucks, dooming the A&MR. Service on the line ceased in 1983 and it the line was abandoned May 24, 1985.

In September 1988 the Eureka Southern Railroad purchased the AMR from Simpson Timber Company for $300,000 (equivalent to $969,763 in 2025). Service on other parts of the system was briefly resumed in 1994 by the North Coast Railroad but ceased permanently after landslides led to the closure of the entire Humboldt County portion of their track in 1998.

The Arcata and Mad River Railroad was last used in 1992; all fixtures were removed by 1998. A trail on the former right-of-way was proposed by the North Coast Rail Authority in 1997. Although little progress has been made on the trail, the Blue Lake Chamber of Commerce sponsors an annual parade celebrating the history of the railroad.

A number of the railroad's cars were built by the Carter Brothers, which was the major builder of narrow-gauge equipment on the West Coast in the 1800s. One of these cars is preserved at the Society for the Preservation of Carter Railroad Resources.

== See also ==
- Northwestern Pacific Railroad
