= Schellville, California =

Unincorporated community in California, United States

- Unincorporated community
- Location within California Location within the United States
- Coordinates: 38°14′46″N 122°26′23″W
- Country: United States
- State: California
- County: Sonoma
- Elevation: 13 ft (4.0 m)
- Time zone: UTC-8 (Pacific (PST))
  - Summer (DST): UTC-7 (PDT)
- Area code: 707
- GNIS feature ID: 252789

Schellville is an unincorporated community in Sonoma County, California, United States. Schellville was named after Theodore L. Schell, who lived on a ranch nearby. The community is located in the vicinity of the junction of California State Route 12 and California State Route 121, south of Sonoma, and had a post office from 1888 to 1931. Schellville also boasted a newspaper called the Schellville Ray, which was also used to promote local plots of land for sale.

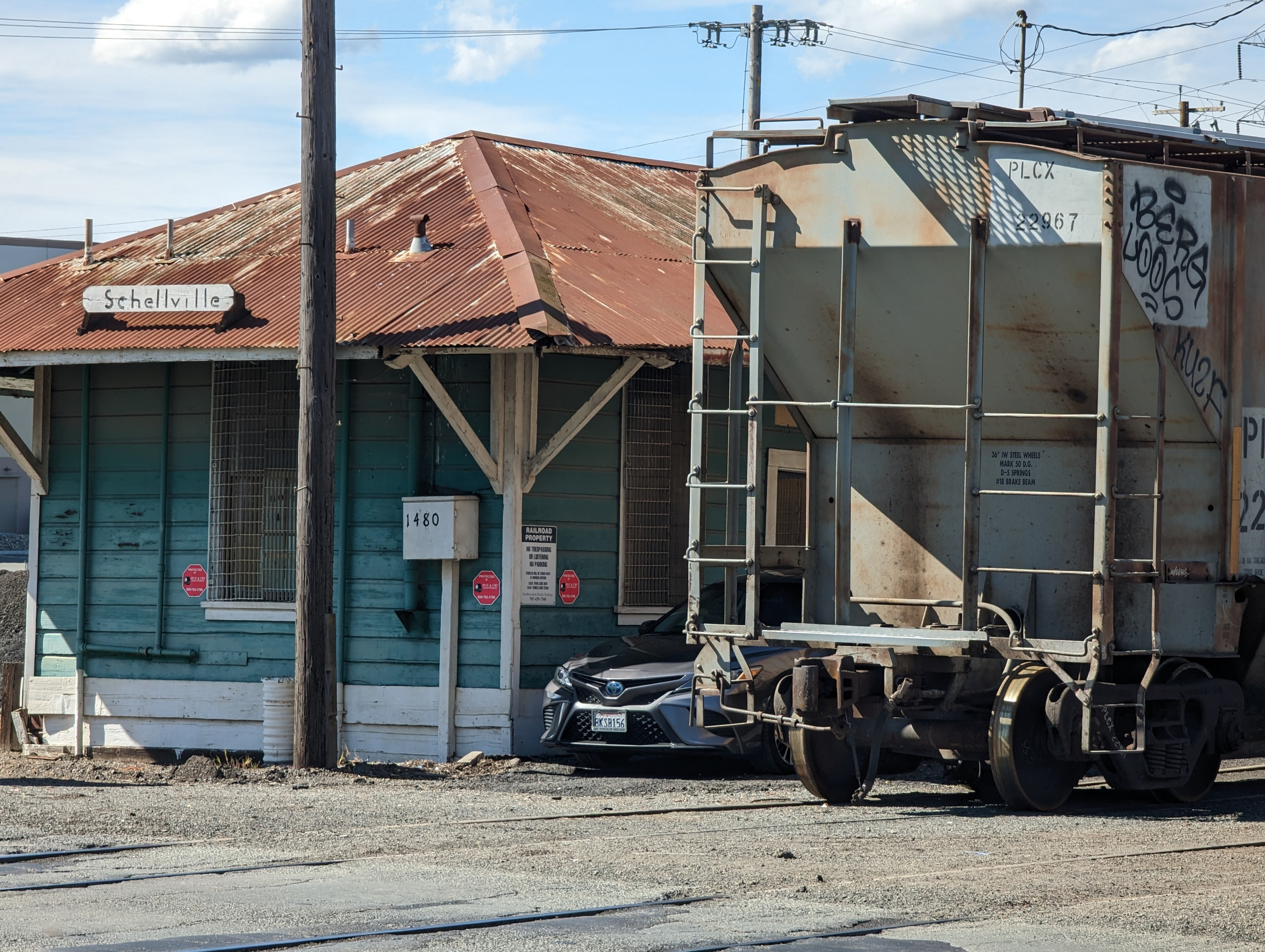
The Schellville train depot in 2023

Schellville has been a regionally important rail junction since completion of the Santa Rosa and Carquinez Railroad to Napa Junction in 1888 and served as a hub for the Southern Pacific Railroad, Northwestern Pacific Railroad, California Northern Railroad, and the current operator Sonoma Marin Area Rail Transit. The two-mile long Northwestern Pacific Railroad railyard is located just south of the Schellville Depot at California State Routes 12/121 and Eighth Street East, and the depot building, which was formerly a passenger station, now serves as SMART's Freight Division office.

Until it ended in 2014, Valley of the Moon Commute Club operated a once-daily transbay express service to San Francisco via Schellville, Sonoma, El Verano, Boyes Hot Springs, Santa Rosa, and San Rafael.

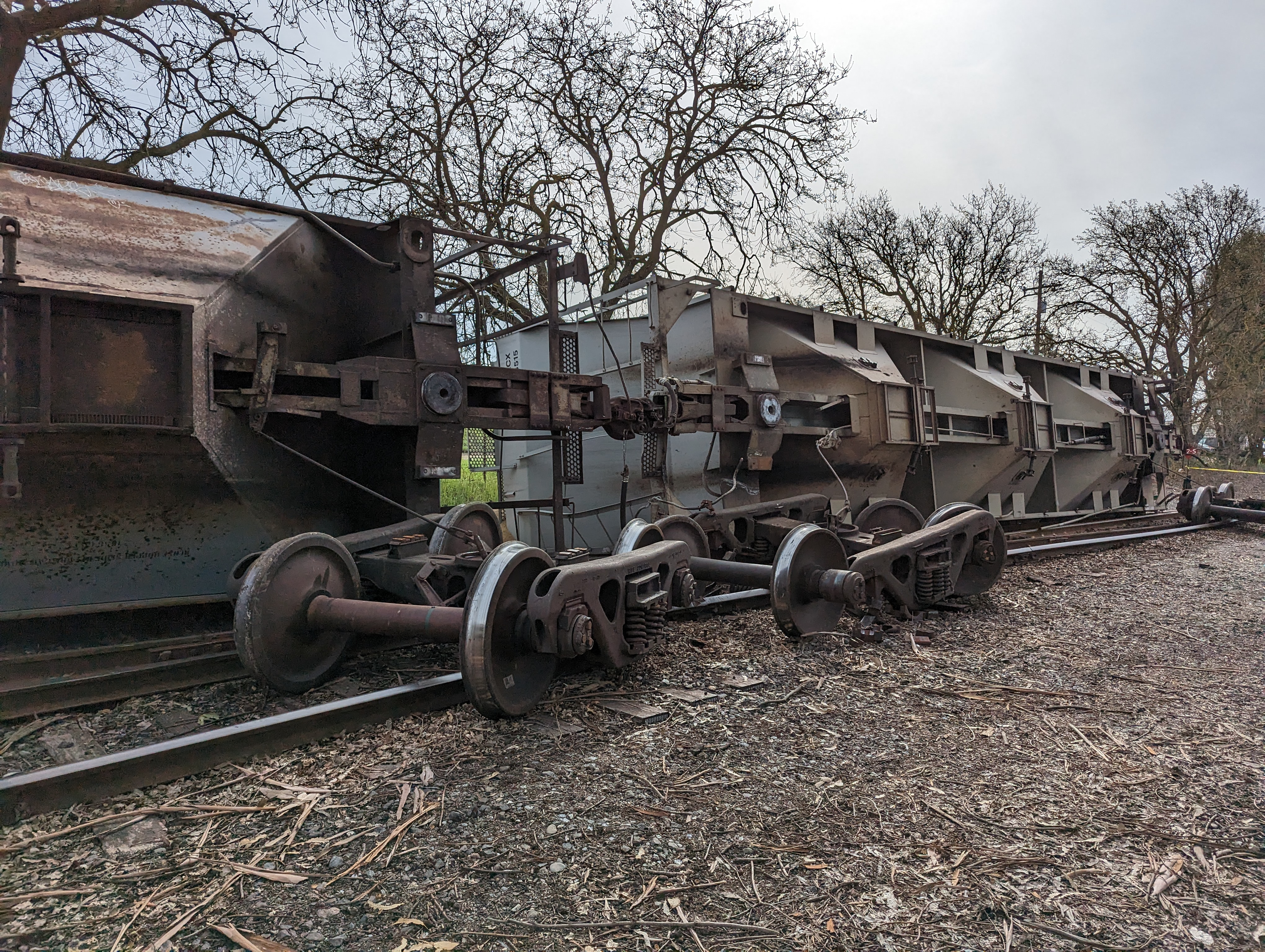
Grain cars laying on their side after derailment

Due to its low position along Sonoma Creek, the town regularly experiences flooding in high-rain years (about every 5–10 years).

The Windows XP "Bliss" wallpaper was taken near Schellville, California in 1996.

== 2023 derailment ==
On March 16, 2023, an eight-car train carrying corn seed derailed on the tracks near CA-121, across from the depot. The derailment, in which four cars toppled over, was reportedly caused by months of sustained heavy rainfall, and oversaturated soil. There were no injuries, and the locomotive, NWP #1501, was unharmed.
