= Santa Rosa and Carquinez Railroad =

Railway line in California

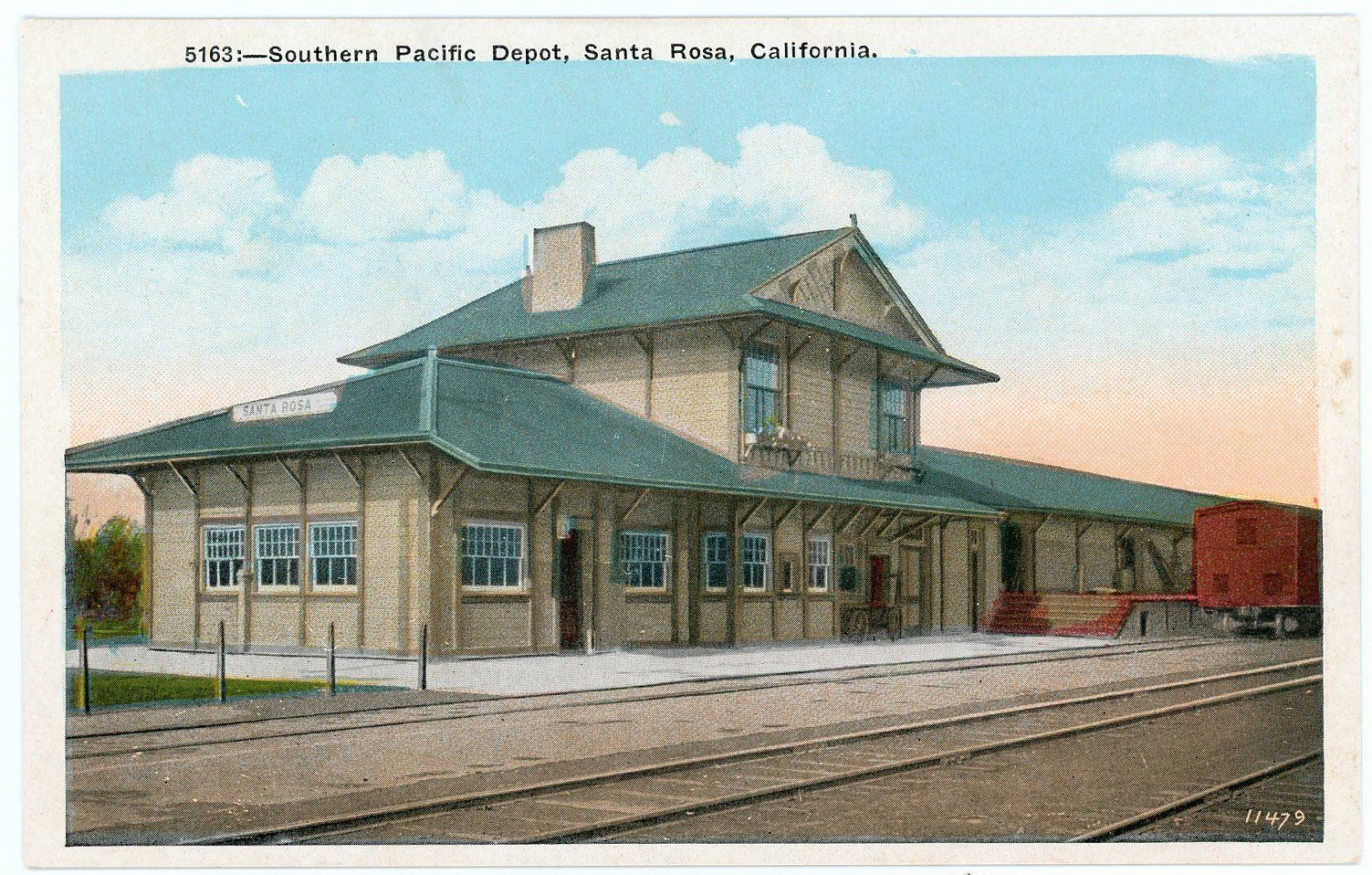
- This station was located at the Santa Rosa terminal rail yard adjacent to North Street between 13th and 14th streets.

Overview
- Locale: California
- Dates of operation: 1888–1935
- Successor: Southern Pacific

Technical
- Track gauge: 4 ft 8 1/2 in (1,435 mm) standard gauge
- Length: 35.7 miles (57.5 km)

The Santa Rosa and Carquinez Railroad was completed in 1888 from a terminal rail yard in Santa Rosa, California, through the Valley of the Moon to Sonoma, and then south through Schellville and east across the northern San Francisco Bay wetlands to a connection with the national rail network at Napa Junction north of Vallejo. The line was part of the Southern Pacific subsidiary Northern Railway until formally merged into the Southern Pacific in 1898. It was operationally known as Southern Pacific's Santa Rosa Branch or Sonoma Valley Branch. The railroad avoided the ferries of San Francisco Bay providing direct transportation to eastern markets for agricultural products of the Sonoma County wine region; and dimension stone from the basalt quarries in what is now Annadel State Park became a major source of freight revenue. The Santa Rosa terminal rail yard was on the north side of College Avenue approximately one mile northeast of the earlier Santa Rosa Downtown station now served by SMART.

== Legacy ==
After Southern Pacific gained control of the Northwestern Pacific Railroad a rail connection was built westerly from the Santa Rosa terminal between Santa Rosa Junior College and Santa Rosa High School allowing Northwestern Pacific trains to serve the freight houses along North Street. The irregular surface of stone pavement became less popular as automobiles replaced horses, and reduced freight volume from the Valley of the Moon caused abandonment of the line between Santa Rosa and Sonoma in 1935. Santa Rosa's Montgomery Drive was built along the former railroad alignment, and some abandoned bridge abutments may be seen where the railroad paralleled the south side of California State Route 12 through the Valley of the Moon. Freeway construction through Santa Rosa severed rail connection with the Santa Rosa terminal rail yard. Apartment buildings now cover most of the former rail yard, although a few of the freight houses survived into the 21st century as moving company warehouses. The City of Sonoma retained a rail connection to Schellville until the late 20th century, and the railroad east of Schellville remains in service connecting Sonoma County to the national rail network.
