= Napa Junction, California =

Unincorporated community in California, United States

Napa Junction
- unincorporated community
- Location in California Napa Junction (the United States)
- Coordinates: 38°11′15″N 122°15′03″W
- Country: United States
- State: California
- County: Napa
- Elevation: 79 ft (24 m)
- Time zone: Pacific Time Zone

Napa Junction (formerly Adelante) is an unincorporated community in Napa County, California, United States. It lies at an elevation of 79 feet (24 m). Napa Junction is located on the California Northern Railroad (formerly the Southern Pacific Railroad), 7.5 miles (12.1 km) south-southeast of Napa. The junction has connected the railroads of the California Coast Ranges north of San Francisco Bay to the national rail network since completion of the Santa Rosa and Carquinez Railroad in 1888.

The Adelante post office functioned from 1869 to 1871. The Napa Junction post office opened in 1875, was closed for a time in 1880, and closed permanently in 1933.

Part of Napa Junction has been annexed to and incorporated in American Canyon.
