= Luffenholtz, California =

Former settlement in California, United States

Coordinates: 41°2′24.94″N 124°7′13.6″W

Luffenholtz is a former settlement in Humboldt County, California, United States. It is located on the railroad line, 5 miles (8 km) southeast of Trinidad.

A post office operated at Luffenholtz from 1904 to 1909.

The abandoned town site is now part of Luffenholtz Beach County Park, with rocky coves and tide pools.
