= Haystack Landing =

Historic property in Sonoma County, California

Coordinates: 38.2242°N 122.6092°W

Haystack Landing is a historic property in Sonoma County, California, now owned by Dutra Materials. Haystack Landing was a passenger and freight connection on San Francisco Bay via the Petaluma River and San Pablo Bay. The landing is currently the site of a historic steamer dock, a railroad bridge, and of a planned asphalt production and storage facility. Haystack Landing was featured in then-congressman Frank Riggs' election campaign in the 1996 California First Congressional District race, when his ties to the property drew criticism.

== History ==
In the mid-to-late 1850s, a man named Rudesill built a dock for passenger and cargo loading at Haystack Landing after Charles Minturn and Thomas Fulsher Baylis launched competing steam-boat services on the Petaluma River. The Petaluma and Haystack Railroad was founded, built, and then attached to the steamer dock at Haystack Landing, with service beginning on August 1, 1864. This railroad was only the third railroad in California. The connection provided trade from the North via the Petaluma River, which connected to San Pablo Bay and San Francisco Bay. The most commonly traded goods were eggs, chicks, and grain.

In the interest of improving commerce along the Petaluma River, a Congressionally authorized examination of the Petaluma river in 1879 determined that 60,000 tons of freight and 13,000 passengers per year were traveling on one steam boat between Haystack Landing and San Francisco. This examination led to federal funds being appropriated for dredging and maintenance of the river.

In 1933, work began dredging the Petaluma River from the bridge at Haystack Landing to just south of the Petaluma City Limits. Haystack Landing was also the transfer point for gravel used in the Golden Gate Bridge's concrete piers, where the gravel was transferred from rail to barge.

The site was operated as a quarry and asphalt plant from 1968 to 2005 by its current owner, Dutra Materials, which plans to build a new asphalt plant at the same site.

== Modern day ==
=== Bridge ===
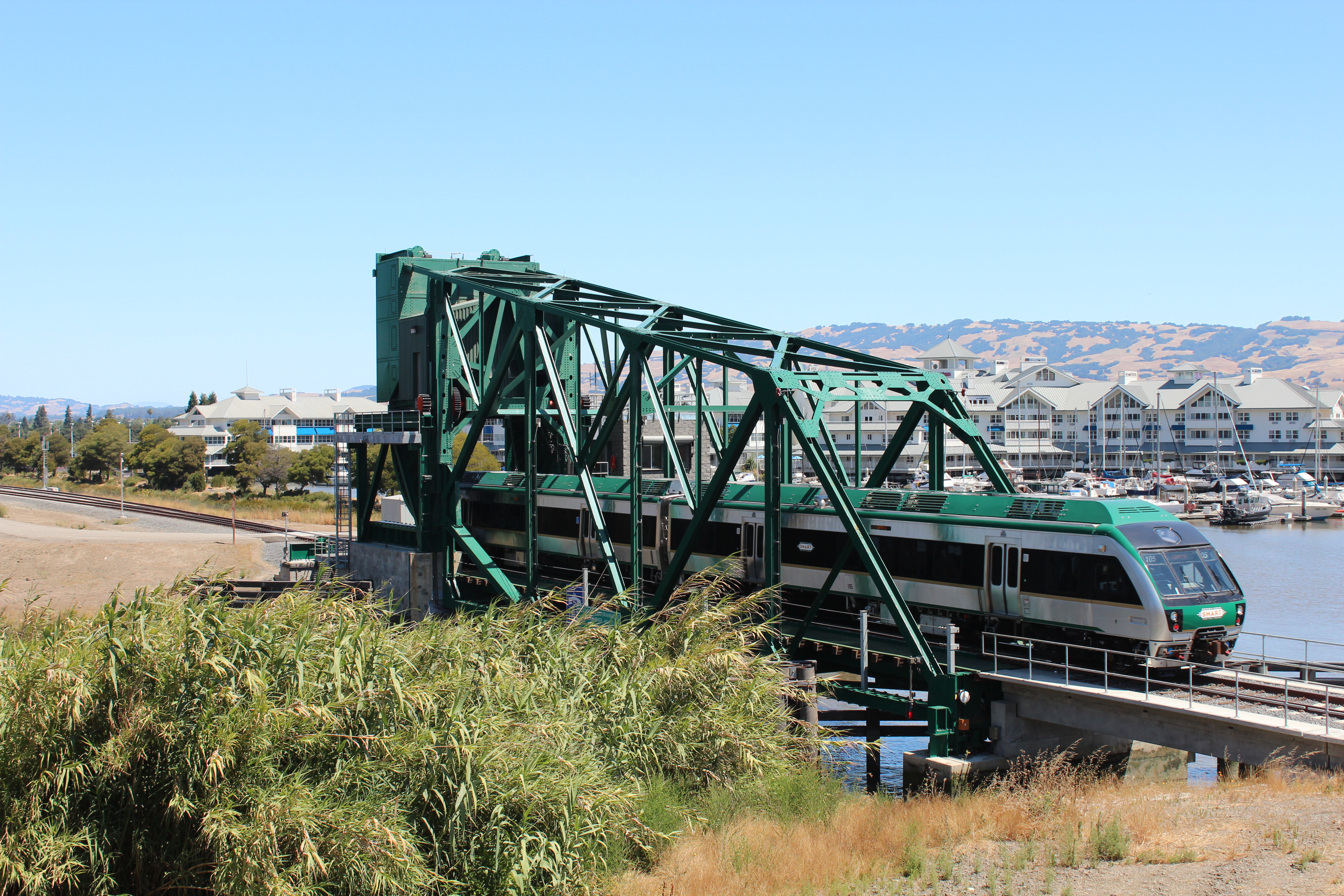
SMART train crossing the new bridge at Haystack Landing

In 2015, a railroad bridge built in 1903 was removed and replaced with a refurbished bridge that could accommodate high-speed rail traffic. The $4.2 million refurbished bridge, built in 1986, was purchased from Galveston, Texas, where it had been intended to be scrapped. 125 ft (38 m) long and weighing 2.2-million lb (1.00-million kg), the "Scherzer rolling lift bascule bridge" uses a counter-weight to raise the bridge.

=== Dutra asphalt plant and storage facility ===
The current owner of the property, Dutra Materials, is a company producing asphalt, aggregate, and other similar products. Dutra plans to build an asphalt manufacturing plant and storage facility, but faces substantial local opposition. The company cited the barge landing and access to the freeway as benefits of the location. Concerns were raised about potential noise, air quality, and pollution. In 2009, it was reported the plant would produce 664,000 tons of material per year, with 225,000 tons of that being asphalt. In 2011, environmentalists filed a lawsuit that alleged county oversight of the project was insufficient. Dutra won the lawsuit in 2014. In 2016 the San Francisco Bay Regional Water Quality Control Board expressed concerns that Dutra had not sufficiently explained why this location was better than any other location. In 2017, work began on the asphalt plant, but at that time had not received all of the necessary permits to complete the bulk of the project. On August 17, 2018, the San Francisco Bay Regional Water Quality Control Board sent a letter to Dutra stating “… staff have determined that the applicant has not yet demonstrated that the proposed project constitutes the least environmentally damaging practicable alternative.” Concerns were raised regarding plans to use barges on the Petaluma River for shipping, as the nearby Shollenberger Park wetlands considered environmentally sensitive.

=== Frank Riggs' congressional campaign ===
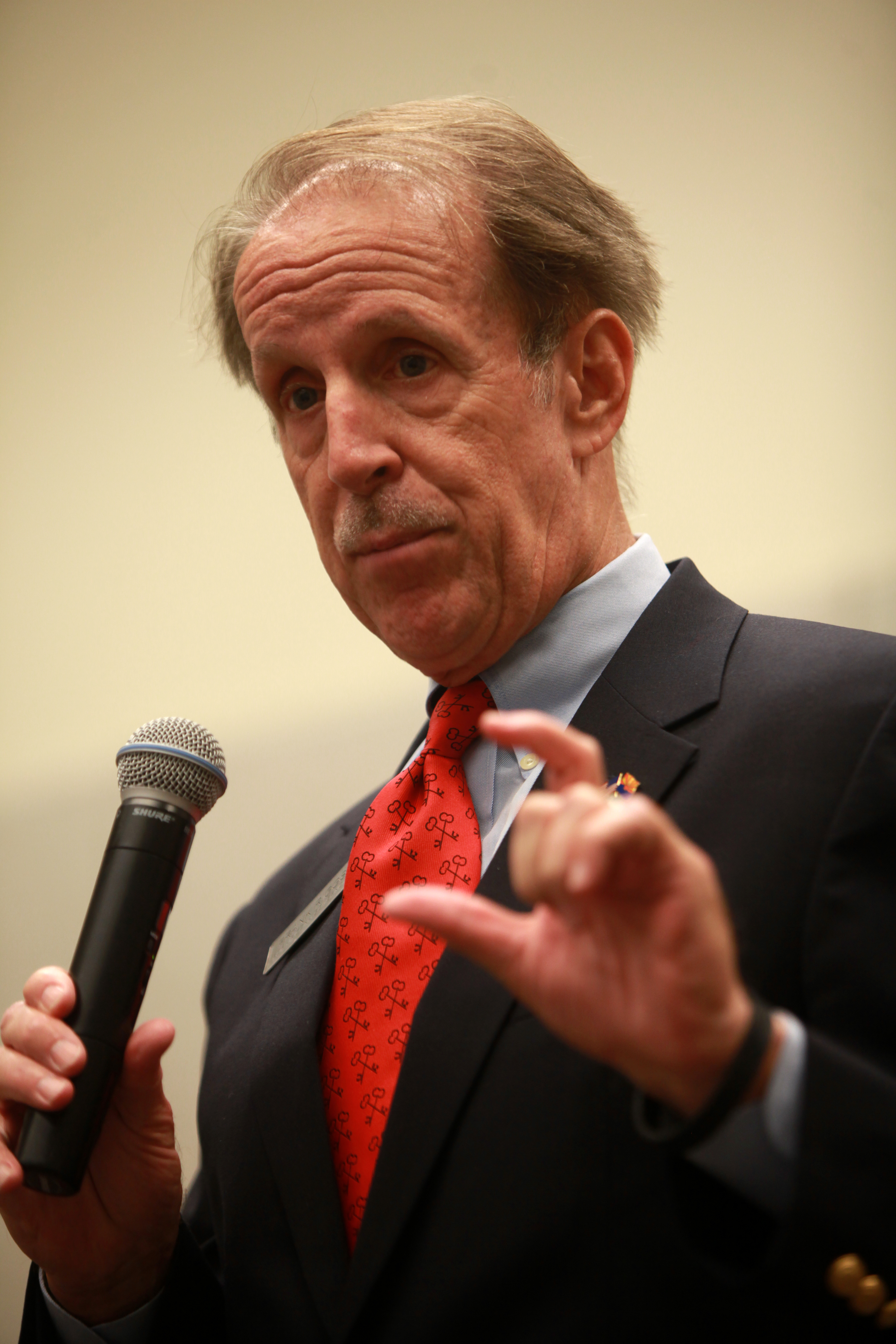
Frank Riggs

In 1989, Frank Riggs purchased a 25% interest in a 37-acre parcel of land at Haystack Landing. SFGate reported that it was intended to be developed as a hotel and office complex and that when Riggs was running for US Congress in 1990, he "indicated...he would sell his commercial real estate holdings to avoid any perception" of abuse of office. As of 1996, however, he had not sold his holdings in a partnership that held a 37-acre parcel of land at Haystack Landing, a fact that drew criticism from Democrats. He stated the reason he still held his one-quarter interest was that he was unable to find a buyer.

Riggs was reported to have sold his 37-acre parcel as of March 1, 1998, and to have protested against an environmental protection ballot measure meant to accompany the transportation plan for both the (now) SMART commuter rail and expansion of Highway 101 through Sonoma and Marin Counties. He was reported to have said that highway improvements "...should not be used as an excuse to put a stranglehold on appropriate development."

== Legend ==
Haystack Landing was featured in the film Incident at Haystack Landing, a Blair Witch Project-style film written and directed by Christopher Chacon. The film retells a local legend of multiple deaths, including dock workers killed in a mysterious fire and children being crushed between the dock and a barge. According to the Petaluma Argus-Courier, no historical society treats these legends as having any factual basis.
