= Island Mountain =

Mountain in California, United States

- Location within California

Highest point
- Elevation: 3,847 ft (1,173 m) NGVD 29
- Coordinates: 39°57′48″N 123°29′31″W

Geography
- Location: Trinity County, California, U.S.
- Parent range: Range from Mendocino County to Trinity County
- Topo map(s): USGS Bell Springs and Updegraff Ridge

Island Mountain is a resistant formation of volcanic and metavolcanic rock in the Franciscan Assemblage of southwestern Trinity County, California. It was mined for sulfur metal deposits during the first half of the 20th century and was the final obstacle in the construction of a railroad line to Eureka, California in 1914. The name is applied to the range, the peak, a populated place and an abandoned railroad station, tunnel and bridge all but the first located within the S-bend of the Eel River which gave the peak its name.

== Geography ==
Island Mountain is a named peak in the Island Mountain range which covers an area from Mendocino County into Trinity County. The highest point of this range, and its official centroid, is a benchmark called "South Peak" on the unnamed tallest point which is in Mendocino County. Island Mountain in Trinity County was named by settlers in the 1850s because it is nearly isolated by water from two creeks and the Eel River. Due to the resistance of the rock to erosion, the Eel River makes an abrupt "S" curve around Island Mountain in its otherwise north-northwesterly flow between the California Coast Ranges. It was noted as "Island Peak" by John Rockwell of the Coast Survey in 1878.

== Railroad history ==
The Island Mountain itself (40°1′25.89″N 123°29′50.95″W) was the final obstacle to completion of the Northwestern Pacific Railroad between San Francisco and Eureka. Railroad construction proceeded northerly down the west side of the Eel River canyon and bridged the river at the "S" curve to enter 4,313-foot (0.82 mi; 1.31 km) tunnel number 27 through the mountain. There was a golden spike ceremony downstream of the mountain at Cain Rock in 1914 to complete the railroad. The redwood framing of tunnel 27 burned on September 6, 1978, and a significant length of the tunnel collapsed. Tunnel rebuilding costing 3.8 million dollars was completed on December 7, 1979. Stop number 293, also named "Island Mountain" on the Northwestern Pacific Railroad was located along the tracks near the river where a railroad bridge crosses the Eel prior to the tracks entering the south end of Island Mountain tunnel at milepost 194.8.

== Mining history ==
A volcanogenic massive sulfide ore deposit within Island Mountain was mined after rail service became available. Between 1915 and 1930, 4,100 tons of copper, 140,000 ounces of silver, and 8,600 ounces of gold were mined. Minerals identified within the ore body include chalcanthite, chalcopyrite, copiapite, goslarite, pyrite, and pyrrhotite. Volcanic rock was quarried from Island Mountain by Northwestern Pacific Railroad for heavy riprap used as far away as Humboldt Bay.

== Populated place ==
Island Mountain is the name of a populated place located in Trinity County located at 40°1′33.6″N 123°29′24″W, 538 feet (164 m) above sea level. The first post office here was established in 1905 under the name "Island" until August 16, 1915, when it was renamed "Island Mountain."
