= California Northern Railroad =

Class III line up the western Sacramento Valley

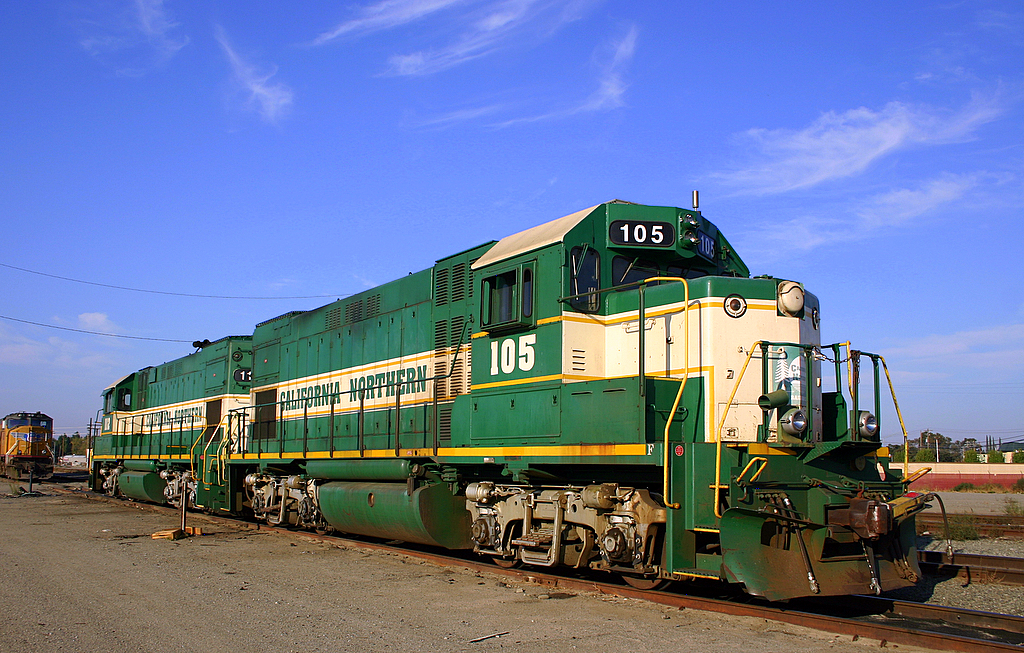
- CFNR #105 EMD GP15-1.

Overview
- Headquarters: Woodland, California
- Reporting mark: CFNR
- Locale: Northern California
- Dates of operation: 1993–present

Technical
- Track gauge: 4 ft 8 1/2 in (1,435 mm) standard gauge
- Length: 233 mi (375 km)

Other
- Website: gwrr.com/cfnr

The California Northern Railroad (reporting mark CFNR) is one of several Class III short-line railroad companies owned by Genesee & Wyoming, Inc. It operates over Southern Pacific Railroad (SP) tracks (now Union Pacific Railroad) under a long-term lease.

The CFNR was originally owned by the Park-Sierra Rail Group (owner David L. Parkinson of St. Helena, California), who also owned the Arizona and California Railroad and the Puget Sound and Pacific Railroad. The CFNR was later sold to RailAmerica in 2002. Genesee & Wyoming, another shortline holding company, bought RailAmerica in December 2012.

The railroad transports mainly food and agricultural commodities, as well as stone products. It moved around 26,000 carloads of goods in 2008.

== Lines Operated ==
=== SP & Old NWP (Suisun/Fairfield–Willits) ===
==== Current Suisun/Fairfield - Schellville ====
Presently, the CFNR only operates between Suisun/Fairfield to a connection with the Northwestern Pacific Railroad at Schellville, California. The CFNR also operated into Vallejo, California over the original California Pacific Railroad mainline that was constructed in 1867/1868. Due to the new construction of homes, apartments, and commercial buildings in 2010, the CFNR abandoned the line due to a new rail carrier coming in and operating the line. Mare Island Naval Base, in Vallejo, is coming back alive to the newly established Mare Island Rail Service out of Olympia with scrap metal, rock, and boating material being shipped in and out of the Island. A facility on the northern part of the island operated by rail contractor Alstom is currently repairing Capitol Corridor cars used by the Amtrak California fleet around the Bay Area for passenger service.

CFNR operates over the Union Pacific's Martinez Subdivision with trackage rights between Suisun/Fairfield and Davis during weeknights for power changes and the Suisun/Fairfield-based Local which interchanges cars between Suisun/Fairfield and Davis.

==== 1993 Operation between Schellville–Willits ====
Originally, in 1993 the CFNR operated much further than Schellville and their operation extended as far north as Willits, California. At Willits the CFNR interchanged with the North Coast Railroad. The North Coast Railroad ran from Willits to Eureka, California over the old NWP.

The CFNR also interchanged with the California Western Railroad at Willits. The California Western Railroad runs west from Willits to Fort Bragg, California.

=== Lombard Yard ===
Located in American Canyon, California, Lombard yard served as CFNR's headquarters for several years. Lombard Yard services such customers as Central Valley Builder's Supply, All Bay Mill & Lumber, Biagi Bros. Shipping, Hess Vineyards, and several others. Also home to CFNR's Lone Palm Shops, routine maintenance and small repairs are carried out by the CFNR shop crews there.

=== SP's West Valley Line (Davis–Tehama) ===
The CFNR currently operates over SP's former West Valley Line. This line between Woodland and Tehama was constructed by Central Pacific's subsidiary, the Northern Railway. The track between Davis and Woodland was built by the California Pacific Railroad and at one time extended as far north as Yuba City/Marysville via Knight's Landing.

The California Pacific and Northern Railway/Central Pacific came under the operational control of Southern Pacific between 1885 and 1888.

==== Construction Completion Timeline ====
- September 23, 1869 Davis - Woodland - Knight's Landing (California Pacific Railroad)
- July 1, 1876 Woodland - Williams (Northern Ry/Central Pacific)
- December 28, 1879 Williams - Willows (Northern Ry/Central Pacific)
- July 31, 1882 Willows - Orland (Northern Ry/Central Pacific)
- September 27, 1882 Orland - Tehama (Northern Ry/Central Pacific)
- July 1, 1888 Willows - Fruto (West Side and Mendocino Railroad/Northern Ry) Branch currently ends at Johns-Manville Fiberglass Plant west of Willows

In 2009 CFNR repaired the Thomes Creek Bridge in Corning for a connection in Tehama, CA with the Union Pacific Railroad. Bell Carter Olive Company is still the primary customer on the Northern part of the line as well as Artois Feed & Grain in Artois. Other smaller customers are located in Richfield, Hamilton City, Willows, and Maxwell. Many customers on that end of the line have moved to private trucking companies to transport their goods due to lower prices.

=== SP's West Side Line (Tracy–Los Banos) ===
This mainline route was formerly known as Southern Pacific's "West Side Line" and at one time extended from Tracy, California and then south through the West side of the San Joaquin Valley (I-5 corridor) via Patterson, Gustine, Newman, Los Banos, Oxalis and then east to Fresno via Ingle and Kerman. California Northern Railroad now operates the northern section of the line from Tracy to Los Banos. SJVR operates the southern section of the line from Oxalis to Fresno and was at one time owned by Port Railroads, Inc. (PRI; also a Kyle subsidiary) and operated by the SJVR. On April 24, 1996 the PRI was merged into the SJVR. Both the PRI and SJVR were already Kyle Railway subsidiaries. The section of track between Los Banos and Oxalis was abandoned by Southern Pacific in 1993 and the tracks were removed soon after. The Southern Pacific constructed the track from Tracy to Newman (37 miles) and from Los Banos to Armona (near Fresno) in 1891. Southern Pacific's overnight Owl Limited passenger train (#57/58) operated over this line between San Francisco and Los Angeles into the 1960s.

Primary traffic on the West Side Subdivision is food and agriculture based commodities such as tomatoes, tomato paste, grain and other agriculture goods. An ethanol facility located near Tracy is starting to maximize production which brings in more traffic for the CFNR including grain, corn and fuels used to run the facility to produce the ethanol. The Tracy Crew is a Monday-Friday operation but may work an occasional Saturday if a customer needs switching out. The crew base is located in Tracy, CA where CFNR interchanges with the Union Pacific Railroad.

== CFNR Interchanges ==
Union Pacific Railroad:

- Davis, California
- Suisun City, California
- Tehama, California
- Tracy, California

Northwestern Pacific Railroad:

- Schellville, California

Napa Valley Railroad:

- Rocktram, California

Mare Island Rail Service:

- Vallejo, California

== Trains ==
=== Pipe train ===
Napa Pipe was located at Rocktram, on the Napa branch. It closed in 2004 and was torn down. Between 1993 and 2004, California Northern ran a unit pipe train from Lombard to Roseville, CA. California Northern would pick up short cuts of cars from Napa Pipe, and assemble the train in Lombard yard, usually filling two tracks. The pipe trains would sometimes be combined with Rabanco's MSW (Material Solid Waste) trains, forming trains over 100 cars long, sometimes with two sets of helpers.

== Equipment ==
=== Locomotives ===
Motive power for the California Northern had consisted of fourteen EMD GP15-1 locomotives, two EMD SD40 locomotives, two EMD SD9 locomotives, two EMD SD9E locomotives, and one EMD SW1500 locomotive, built between the late 1940s and 1970s. Currently, California Northern owns twelve locomotives, as several have been sold to other railroad companies, including Union Pacific, Fillmore and Western Railway, Trans Canada Switching, Hudson Bay, Mosaic, Twin Mountain, and San Joaquin Valley Railroad. In 2009 the railroad began a program to replace their existing fleet with new fuel-efficient locomotives, known as "gensets", or 3GS21B-DE, built by National Railway Equipment. 80 percent of the funding for the purchase of these new locomotives comes from a grant from the Carl Moyer Memorial Air Quality Standards Attainment Program at the Bay Area Air Quality Management District.

From 2009 to December 2011, the following GP15-1 locomotives had been moved from CFNR property to other RailAmerica properties across the entire system: CFNR 103, 104, 105, 106, 107, 108, 110, and 111. During that time, CFNR GP15-1's 109 and 112 were being kept as backup units in case any of the "gensets" had mechanical failures, if a train needed more motive power, or for special assignments within the CFNR property. After G&W bought out Rail America in December 2012, CFNR GP15-1's 109, 112, and 113 were repainted and renumbered as CFNR 1568, 1569, and 1570 respectively.

In 2019 the railroad purchased a couple of Tier 4 low-emission locomotives, or KLW SE24B, that were built by the Knoxville Locomotive Works. Like the gensets, the railroad was granted $3.7 million from the Bay Area Air Quality Management District to purchase the locomotives. The president of CFNR, Brad Ovitt, said about the purchase, "We’re grateful to the Air District for making the purchase of these two low-emission, state-of-the-art locomotives feasible, as they provide benefits to the communities served by the railroad that would not be possible for us to do on a stand-alone basis. It’s a true win-win, public-private partnership."

=== Roster ===
Builder's #	Frame #	Unit #	Model	Date of purchase	Built as	Bought as	Build date	Date of sale	Disposition	Refs.
	757142-12	100	GP15-1	1993	C&NW 4411		June 1976	1996	Union Pacific 1542	
	757142-13	101	GP15-1	1993	C&NW 4412		June 1976	1996	Union Pacific 1543	
	757142-14	102	GP15-1	1993	C&NW 4413		June 1976	1996	Union Pacific 1544	
	757142-15	103	GP15-1	1993	C&NW 4414		June 1976	2011	Ventura County Railroad 1560	
	757142-16	104	GP15-1	1993	C&NW 4415		June 1976	2011	Puget Sound & Pacific 1572	
	757142-17	105	GP15-1	1993	C&NW 4416		June 1976	2011	DGNO 1566	
	757142-18	106	GP15-1	1993	C&NW 4417		June 1976	2011	Puget Sound & Pacific	
	757142-19	107	GP15-1	1993	C&NW 4418		June 1976	2005	DGNO	
	757142-20	108	GP15-1	1993	C&NW 4419		June 1976	2011	DGNO	
	757142-21	109	GP15-1	1993	C&NW 4420		June 1976	2011		
	757142-22	110	GP15-1	1993	C&NW 4421		June 1976	2005	PSAP 1573	
	757142-23	111	GP15-1	1993	C&NW 4422		July 1976	2011	DGNO	
	757142-24	112	GP15-1	1993	C&NW 4423		July 1976			
	757142-25	113	GP15-1	1993	C&NW 4424		July 1976	2011	Mare Island Rail Service	
34973	4557-2	171	SW1500		Appalachicola Northern 713	LLPX 171	1969			
23918	5555-8	200	SD9		DM&IR 138		February 1955	1999	GATX	
23936	5555-28	201	SD9		DM&IR 156		March 1955	1999	GATX	
20223	5381-1	202	SD9E		Southern Pacific 5372	Southern Pacific 4319	January 1955		Omnitrax	
20228	5831-6	203	SD9E		Southern Pacific 5377	Southern Pacific 4331	January 1955		Omnitrax	
	058-0195	500	3GS21B-DE	2010	CFNR 500	CFNR 500	2010	N/A		
	058-0179	501	3GS21B-DE	2009	CFNR 501	CFNR 501	2009	N/A		
	058-0188	502	3GS21B-DE	2009	CFNR 502	CFNR 502	2009	N/A		
	058-0173	503	3GS21B-DE	2009	CFNR 503	CFNR 503	2009	N/A		
	058-0187	504	3GS21B-DE	2009	CFNR 504	CFNR 504	2009	N/A		
	058-0175	505	3GS21B-DE	2009	CFNR 505	CFNR 505	2009	N/A		
	757142-21	1568	GP15-1		C&NW 4420	CFNR 109	June 1976	N/A	Scrapped in May 2019	
	757142-24	1569	GP15-1		C&NW 4423	CFNR 112	July 1976	N/A	Scrapped in May 2019	
	757142-25	1570	GP15-1	2013	C&NW 4424	CFNR 113	July 1976	N/A	Mandated scrapping by EPA, stored	
31453	5697-13	2269	GP38-2	2018	IC 3027	GTMX 2269	1966	N/A		
		2401	SE24B	2019	CFNR 2401	CFNR 2401	2019	N/A		
		2402	SE24B	2019	CFNR 2402	CFNR 2402	2019	N/A		
	7290-39	4097	SD40	2004	Penn Central 6278	NWP 6412	1971	2006	Central Oregon & Pacific	
	7290-44	4098	SD40	2004	Penn Central 6283	NWP 6413	1971	2006	Central Oregon & Pacific	

=== Control Car Remote Control Locomotive ===
The California Northern had one Control Car Remote Control Locomotive (CCRCL) for a time, numbered 2019. Housed inside the frame of an ex-Santa Fe EMD GP20, the unit remained in Santa Fe's "Kodachrome" scheme until its sale.

Builder's #	Frame #	Unit #	Model	Date of purchase	Built as	Bought as	Build date	Date of sale	Disposition
26829	7609-39	2019	CCRCL	2003	ATSF 1163	SDIY 2019	1961	2007	Central Oregon & Pacific

=== Rolling stock ===
In 1998, the California Northern leased fifty gondolas from Daniel J Joseph leasing, LTD (DJJX). Numbered 52001 – 52050, these cars remained on the CFNR for several years until their return to DJJX.
