= North Coast Railroad (1992–1996) =

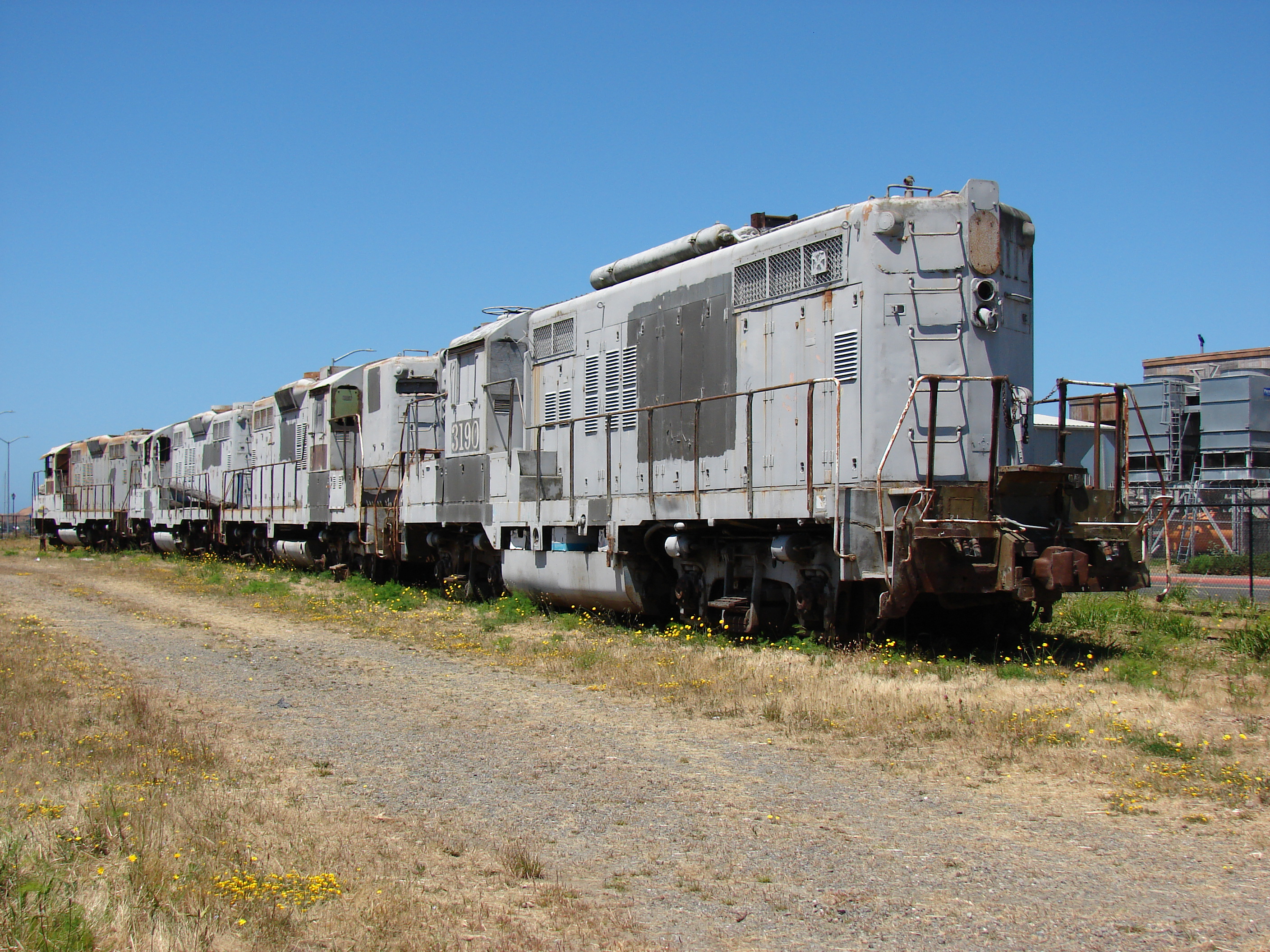
NCRR 2872, 3779, 3857 and 3190 in storage at Eureka, California

The North Coast Railroad (reporting mark NCRR) operated freight trains on the Northwestern Pacific Railroad from Schellville (interchange with the California Northern) to Eureka. The railroad was first founded in 1992.

Using former Southern Pacific GP9s, SD9s and one GP7, from other railroads, they powered freight along the northern and southern end of the line until 1994 when the southern portion from Schellville to Willits of the line was leased to the California Northern Railroad, which operated over the line until 1996 when the southern end began operations as the "new" publicly owned Northwestern Pacific.

The North Coast Railroad continued operations between Willits and Eureka on the former Eureka Southern route until 1993, when the line was shut down due to rail wash-outs and two expensive tunnel collapses.

== Roster ==
Locomotive	Builder	Model	Serial no.	Frame no.	Built	Notes
CCT 70	EMD	GP7	18418	5250-10	1953	scrapped in 2015
171	EMD	SW1500	34973	4557-2	5/1969	to CFNR/LLPX 171; to GMTX 119
SP 2872	EMD	GP9R	25136	5595-37	4/1959	to BUGX; scrapped in 2024
3190	EMD	GP9E	19980	5369-4	4/1955	to BUGX 3190
3779	EMD	GP9E	22922	5516-11	2/1957	to BUGX; scrapped in 2024
3786	EMD	GP9E	22945	5516-34	1957	
3804	EMD	GP9R	22943	5516-32	1957	to BUGX 3804
3825	EMD	GP9E	25133	5595-34	1959	to OMLX 3825; scrapped in 2004
3840	EMD	GP9E	25146	5596-2	1959	to OMLX 3840; to RSSX 3840; to Provident Energy (lease)
3844	EMD	GP9R	25137	5595-38	1959	wrecked 1997
3850	EMD	GP9R	25116	5595-17	1959	wrecked 1997
3857	EMD	GP9R	25139	5595-40	4/1959	to BUGX; scrapped in 2024
4324	EMD	SD9E	19441	5322-13	1954	to OMLX 4324; to Midwest Steel for scrap in 2006; to RECX; to CRGX 100; to BUGX 4324
4327	EMD	SD9E	20229	5381-7	1955	to OMLX/GWR 4327; scrapped on March 8, 2018
4423	EMD	SD9E	21297	5435-9	1956	to OMLX 4423; to NCRY/SP 5472
5305	EMD	SD9	22808	5507-1	1957	to OMLX 5305; to CRRX 5305; scrapped in 2012
6412	EMD	SD40	37004	7290-39	1971	to CFNR 4097; to CORP/CFNR 4097; to KYLE/CFNR 4097; to KRR 4097; to KRR 3219
6413	EMD	SD40	37009	7290-44	1971	to CFNR 4098; to CORP/CFNR 4098; to KYLE/CFNR 4098; to Bro-Tex International Metals
6595	EMD	GP35	29569	5569-19	6/1964	to HBRY 2502; to CKRY 2502; to OMLX/KFR 2256; to IR/OMLX 2256; to PNR/OMLX 2256; to SS/OMLX 2256, 2021, to GFRR/OMLX 3813, 2022
6600	EMD	GP35	29705	7756-4	12/1964	to HBRY 2503; to CKRY/HBRY 2503; to PNR/HBRY 2503; to HBRY 3600; to GWR/HBRY 3600; to OMLX/HBRY 3600; to KFR/OMLX 3600; to WRIX 3600; to WRIX GP39-3 3600; to OERR 3600
