= Barnwell, California =

Barnwell, Manvel
- Ghost town
- Location within the state of California Barnwell, Manvel (the United States)
- Coordinates: 35°17′35″N 115°14′09″W
- Country: United States
- State: California
- County: San Bernardino
- Founded: 1893
- Time zone: UTC-8 (Pacific (PST))
  - Summer (DST): UTC-7 (PDT)

Barnwell, originally a rail camp named Summit, then Manvel, was a former railhead serving local mining camps, now a ghost town, in San Bernardino County, California. It lies at an elevation 4806 feet in the New York Mountains.

== History ==
=== Manvel ===
A mining magnate from Denver, Isaac G. Blake, in April 1892, with an interest in the silver mines in Sagamore Canyon in the New York Mountains, built the Needles Reduction Company mill, in the town of Needles and then in December 1892 began building the Nevada Southern Railway, toward those silver mines and the gold mining town of Vanderbilt from the Santa Fe Railroad station at Goffs, completing it to a rail camp with a post office, named Manvel, then later built it some miles on up nearer the mines, to a rail camp named Summit which was renamed Manvel when the post office relocated there, in July 1893. Manvel was the nearest railhead for nearby mining camps, including Vanderbilt, Goodsprings, Crescent, and Montgomery. However Blake's silver mines, mill and railroad empire was bankrupted by the crash of 1893 and tied up in litigation until after 1907.

The gold mines at Vanderbilt and those discovered to the east at Searchlight, Nevada in the later 1890s, helped to sustain Manvel. Manvel supported a flour, grain, and lumber dealer, a general store, a hotel, a blacksmith, the post office, and a stage line running to Montgomery in 1898 and a school district in January 1900. In early 1902, the Nevada Southern completed a 15-mile extension into the Ivanpah Valley, to a new railhead at Ivanpah, to serve as the shipping point for the nearby Copper World Mine.

At Searchlight, as production steadily increased, Manvel as its main rail shipping point for Searchlight, had a depot, telegraph office, a freight-forwarding house, and an agency of Wells, Fargo & Company. T. A. Brown, the co-founder of the Brown-Gosney Company store, largest in town, organized a telephone system; started several freight lines and a stage line; and opened branches in several nearby camps and towns.

=== Barnwell ===
In early 1905, the San Pedro, Los Angeles and Salt Lake Railroad was completed. The line passed only 20 miles from Searchlight and 15 miles from the Copper World Mine. With this competition in early 1907, the Santa Fé railroad completed a 23-mile extension to Searchlight, the Barnwell and Searchlight Railway. To prevent confusion with a town in Texas, Manvel was renamed Barnwell. The rail line was finished just as Searchlight’s production began to plunge. A depression followed in October. When blue pieces of scrip were introduced in Barnwell as money, families began to leave. In September 1908, a fire destroyed most of Barnwell’s business district, including the depot and the Brown-Gosney Company’s store. The depot never reopened and the Brown-Gosney Company which had earlier moved its headquarters to Searchlight, closed its store in Barnwell in February, 1910 and the town had another fire in May. After production at Searchlight fell drastically in 1911, T. A. Brown moved his family away in 1912. The railroad closed its agency in 1914. The post office was discontinued in April, 1915. The school district was abolished in 1918. All train service was discontinued in late 1923, and the rails were torn up.

== Barnwell today ==
There is a homestead and water tank at the former location of Barnwell. The railroad bed is still there and is still good in many places.
