= California Eastern Railway =

Short-line railroad in California, US

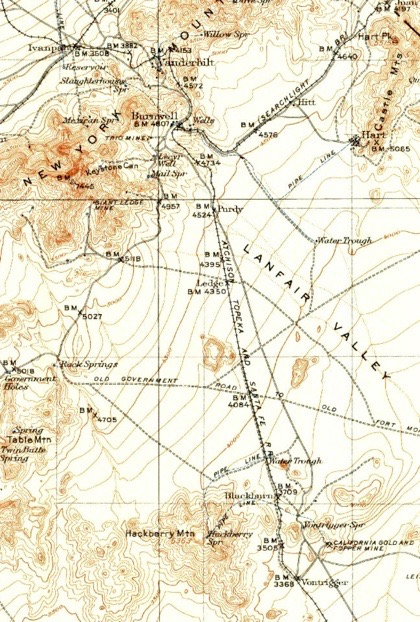
Northern section of California Eastern RR route in 1910

California Eastern Railway, is a defunct 45-mile (72 km) short-line railroad that operated from 1902 to 1911. The railroad ran from Goffs, California, to Ivanpah. It was first a private line operated by a mining company that was acquired by the Atchison, Topeka and Santa Fe Railway.

== History ==
A mining magnate from Denver, Isaac G. Blake, in April 1892, with an interest in the silver mines in Sagamore Canyon in the New York Mountains, built the Needles Reduction Company mill, in the town of Needles and then in December 1892 began building the Nevada Southern Railway, toward those silver mines and the gold mining town of Vanderbilt from the Atchison, Topeka and Santa Fe Railway (ATSF) station at Goffs, completing 25 miles (40 km) to a rail camp with a post office, named Manvel, then later built it five miles (8.0 km) on up nearer the mines and a pass through the mountains, to a rail camp named Summit which was renamed Manvel when the post office relocated there, in July 1893. Manvel renamed Barnwell was the nearest railhead for nearby mining camps, including Vanderbilt, Goodsprings and the mines at Searchlight, Nevada.

In early 1902, the Nevada Southern Railway completed a 15-mile (24 km) extension over the New York Mountains, past Vanderbilt, into the Ivanpah Valley, to a railhead named Ivanpah, to serve as the shipping point for the Copper World Mine. Several months later, the ATSF bought the Nevada Southern Railway and renamed it the California Eastern Railway.

== Abandonment of the line ==
In November 1918, the Copper World Mine was shut down for the last time and in 1921 the California Eastern Railway tore up its tracks between Ivanpah and Goffs.

== Consolidated into California, Arizona and Santa Fe Railway ==
On December 28, 1911, the California Eastern Railway was consolidated into ATSF's non-operating subsidiary, the California, Arizona and Santa Fe Railway.
