= California, Arizona and Santa Fe Railway =

Former railway in the western United States

The California, Arizona and Santa Fe Railway was a non-operating subsidiary (paper railroad) of Atchison, Topeka and Santa Fe Railway (ATSF). It was incorporated in 1911, and was merged into the ATSF in 1963.

California, Arizona and Santa Fe would ultimately be absorbed by Burlington Northern Santa Fe Railway.

== Route ==
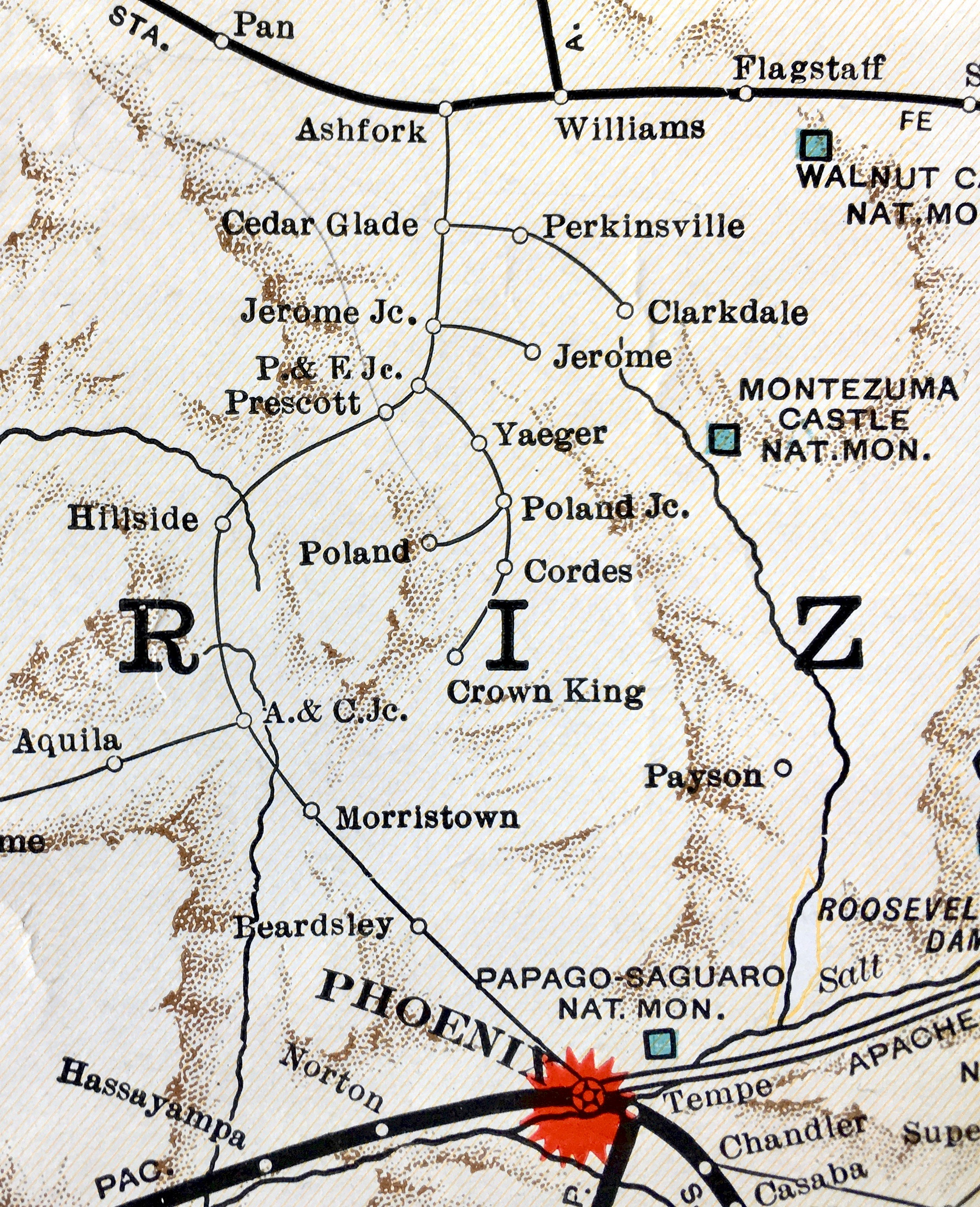
Route in 1930

It owned the ATSF lines between Phoenix–Ash Fork and Phoenix–Mojave. It leased/purchased the tracks built by the Southern Pacific Railroad across the Mojave Desert between Needles and Mojave in Southern California.

== Other predecessors ==
- Arizona and California Railway
- Barnwell and Searchlight Railway
- Bradshaw Mountain Railroad
- California Eastern Railway
- Oakland and East Side Railroad
- Prescott and Eastern Railroad
- Randsburg Railway
- Santa Fe, Prescott and Phoenix Railway

== See also ==
- History of the Mojave Desert region
- Predecessors of the Atchison, Topeka and Santa Fe Railway
