= Walking Box Ranch =

- U.S. National Register of Historic Places
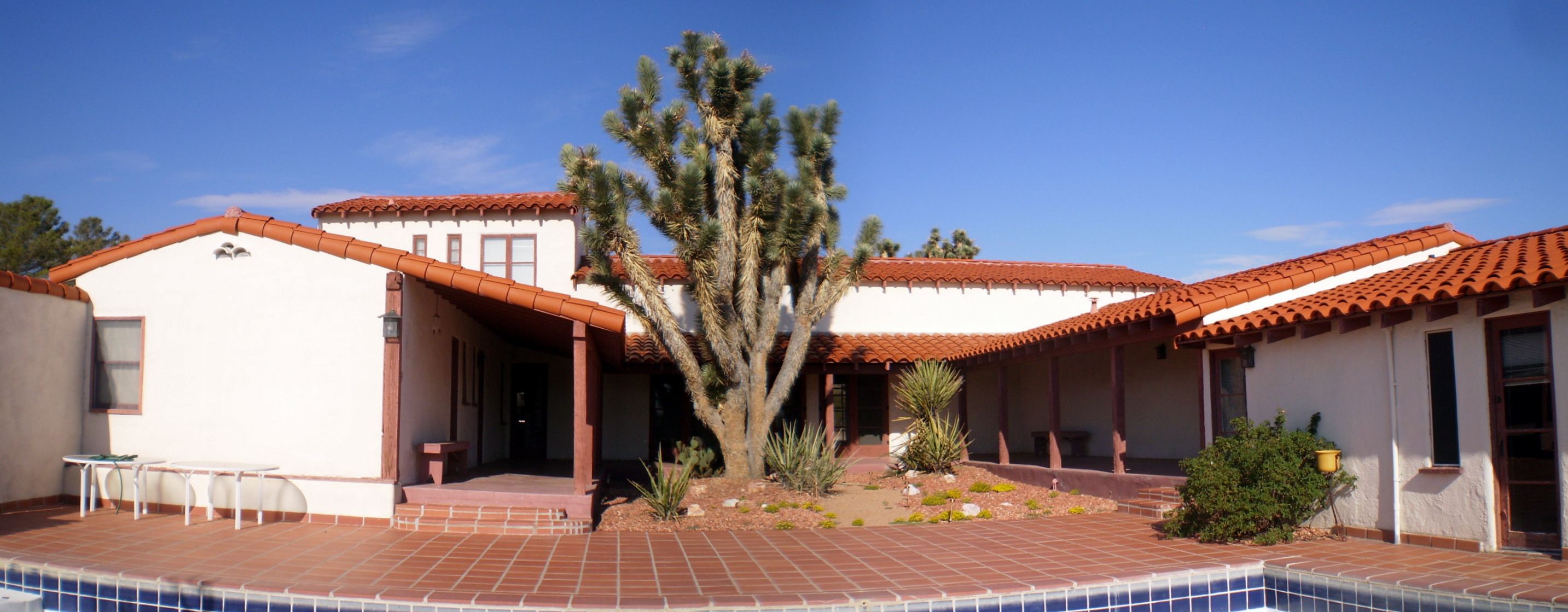

- Location within Nevada Location within the United States
- Location: Clark County, at 6333 West State Route 164; Searchlight, Nevada
- Coordinates: 35°29′22″N 115°2′24.74″W
- Area: 40 acres (16 ha)
- NRHP reference No.: 08001392
- Added to NRHP: January 30, 2009

Walking Box Ranch, 7 mi (11 km) west of Searchlight, Nevada in the Mojave Desert, was founded in 1931 by the actors Rex Bell and Clara Bow as a working 400,000 acres (160,000 ha) ranch. The ranch covered 160 acres (65 ha) at the time it was listed on the National Register of Historic Places on January 30, 2009. The ranch includes four buildings and is owned by the Bureau of Land Management (BLM).

Over the years, Bell and Bow entertained many notable Hollywood figures, including Clark Gable, Carole Lombard, Errol Flynn, and Lionel Barrymore.

== History ==
The Walking Box Ranch was purchased by Bell from the Rock Springs Cattle Company. The company owned 1,000,000 acres (400,000 ha) in the Mojave Desert.

The Nature Conservancy purchased 151,331 acres (61,241 ha) of land that surrounded the Walking Box Ranch in June 1994.

The Walking Box Ranch was purchased by Las Vegas Gaming Investments in 2000 for $950,000.

The Bureau of Land Management purchased the ranch and surrounding ranch site in 2005 using funds from the Southern Nevada Public Land Management Act (SNPLMA.) SNPLMA is also funding the restoration activities which include restoration of the ranch house, stabilization of other structures and infrastructure to support a museum.

Listing on the National Register of Historic Places was one of the goals set out in April 2006 by the University of Nevada, Las Vegas, and the Bureau of Land Management, co-managers of the property. The listing was awarded on January 30, 2009.
