= Ivanpah Solar Power Facility =

Concentrated solar thermal power station in the Mojave Desert of California

Ivanpah Solar Electric Generating System
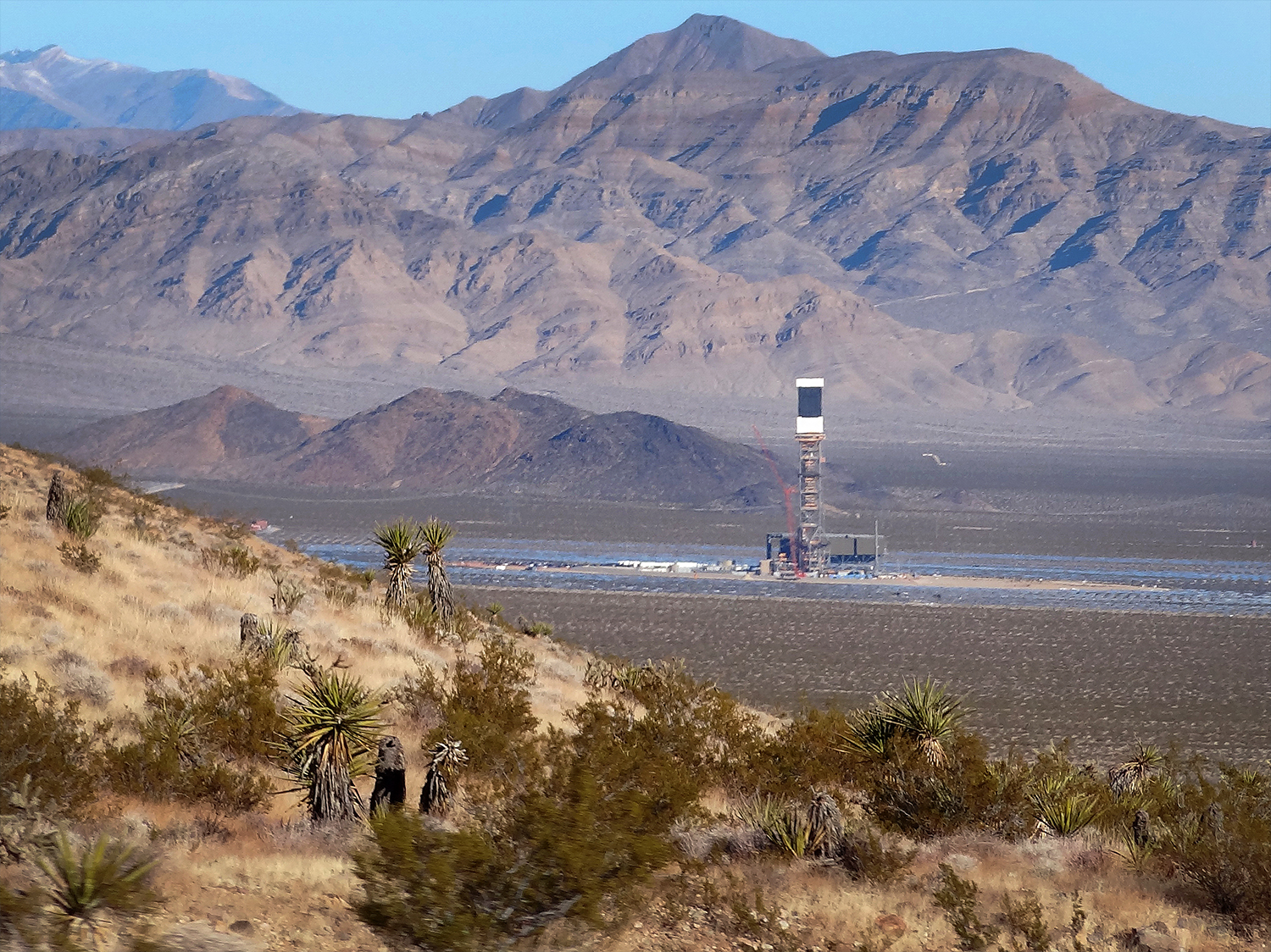
- Looking north towards Ivanpah Facility's eastern boiler tower from Interstate 15
- Country: United States
- Location: near Ivanpah, San Bernardino County, California
- Coordinates: 35.57°N 115.47°W
- Status: Operational
- Construction began: October 27, 2010
- Commission date: February 13, 2014
- Construction cost: $2.2 billion ($2.86 billion in 2024 dollars)
- Owners: NRG Energy; BrightSource Energy; Google
- Employees: 60

Solar farm
- Type: CSP
- CSP technology: Solar power tower
- Collectors: 173,500
- Site resource: 2,717 kWh/m^{2}/yr

Thermal power station
- Primary fuel: Solar energy and natural gas
- Site area: 3,500 acres (1,420 ha)
- Cooling source: Air cooling
- Power purchase agreement: >$0.135 / kWh (estimated)

Power generation
- Units operational: 3
- Make and model: Siemens SST-900
- Nameplate capacity: Unit 1: 126 MW; Units 2 and 3: 133 MW each. Planned: 440 MW gross, build: 392 MW gross, 377 MW net.
- Capacity factor: 24.1% (2018 actual) / 28.5% (planned)
- Annual net output: 856 GW·h

External links
- Website: ivanpahsolar.com
- Commons: Related media on Commons

The Ivanpah Solar Electric Generating System is a concentrated solar thermal plant located in the Mojave Desert at the base of Clark Mountain in California, across the state line from Primm, Nevada. Opened in 2014, it was slated to close in 2026, but that decision was reversed by the California Public Utilities Commission. The facility derives its name from its proximity to Ivanpah, California, which lies within the Mojave National Preserve in San Bernardino County and which derives its name from the Chemehuevi word for "clean water".

The plant has a gross capacity of 392 megawatts (MW). It uses 173,500 heliostats, each with two mirrors focusing solar energy on boilers located on three 459-foot-tall (140 m) solar power towers. The first unit of the system was connected to the electrical grid in September 2013 for a synchronization test. The facility formally opened on February 13, 2014. At that time, it was the world's largest solar thermal power station.

The $2.2 billion facility was developed by BrightSource Energy and Bechtel. The largest investor in the project was NRG Energy which contributed $300 million. Google contributed $168 million. The United States government provided a $1.6 billion loan guarantee and the plant is built on federal land. In 2010, the project was scaled back about 10% from its original 440 MW design to avoid disturbing the habitat of the desert tortoise.

In January 2025, the plant's co-owner NRG Energy announced it was unwinding power purchase agreements with Pacific Gas & Electric Company and Southern California Edison and, subject to regulatory approval, would begin closing the plant in early 2026, readying the site to potentially be repurposed for a different type of solar energy. The facility, though cost effective when it was planned in 2009, became twice as expensive to run as solar photovoltaic technology, which has decreased in price much more rapidly than was expected in the years since Ivanpah's construction. The power companies purchasing electricity from Ivanpah said that they expect the closure will save their ratepayers money. NRG declined to say how much of the $1.6 billion loans guaranteed by the government remained unpaid as of 2025. In December 2025, the closure agreement was unanimously rejected by the California Public Utilities Commission.

== Description ==
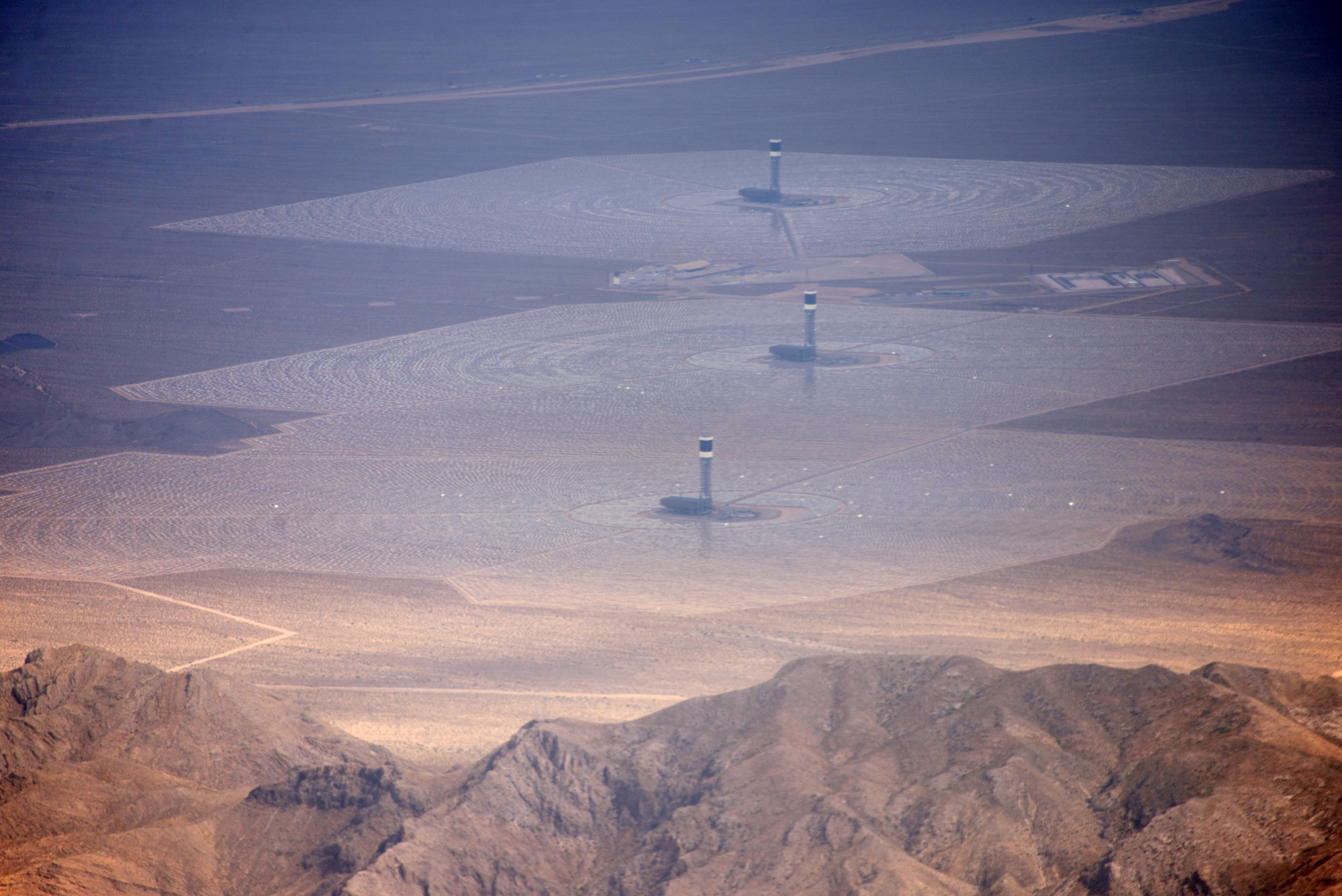
Aerial photograph of Ivanpah Solar Power Facility

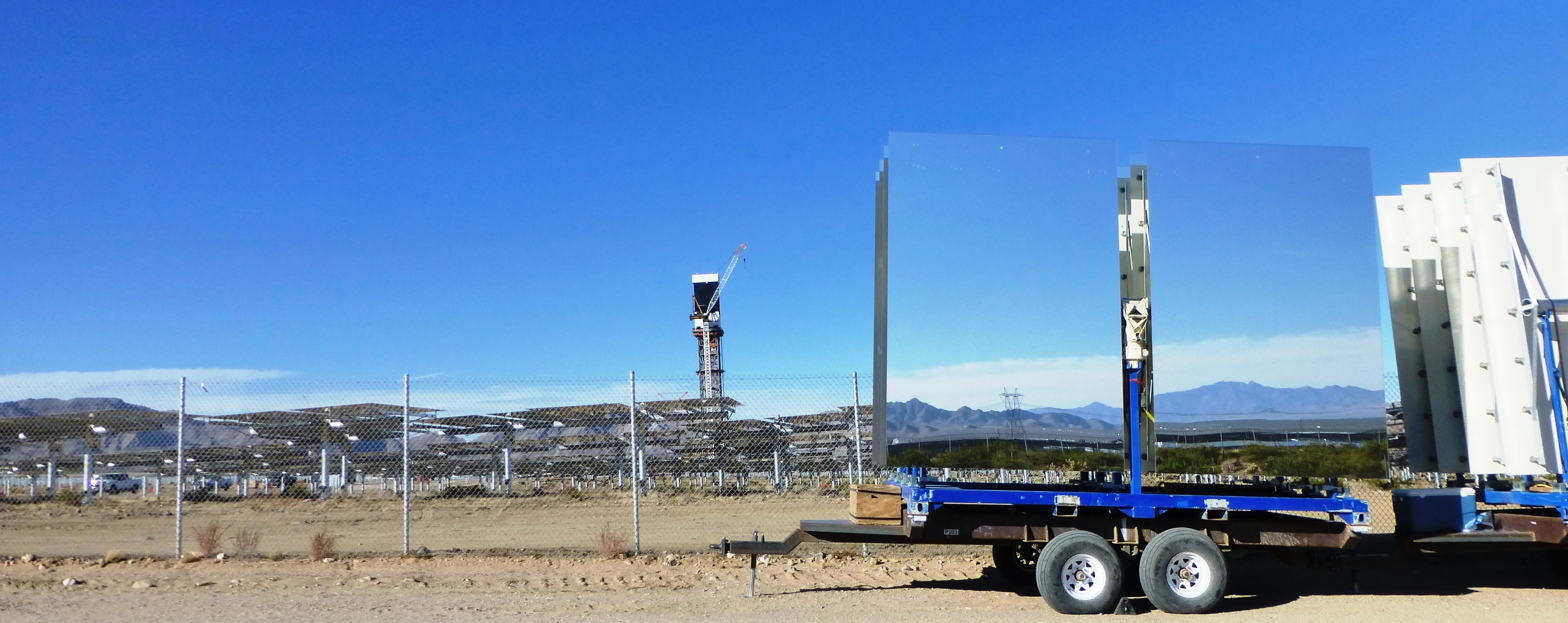
Power tower 2 of the Ivanpah Solar Electric Generating System under construction. The heliostat mirrors on the truck are awaiting installation.

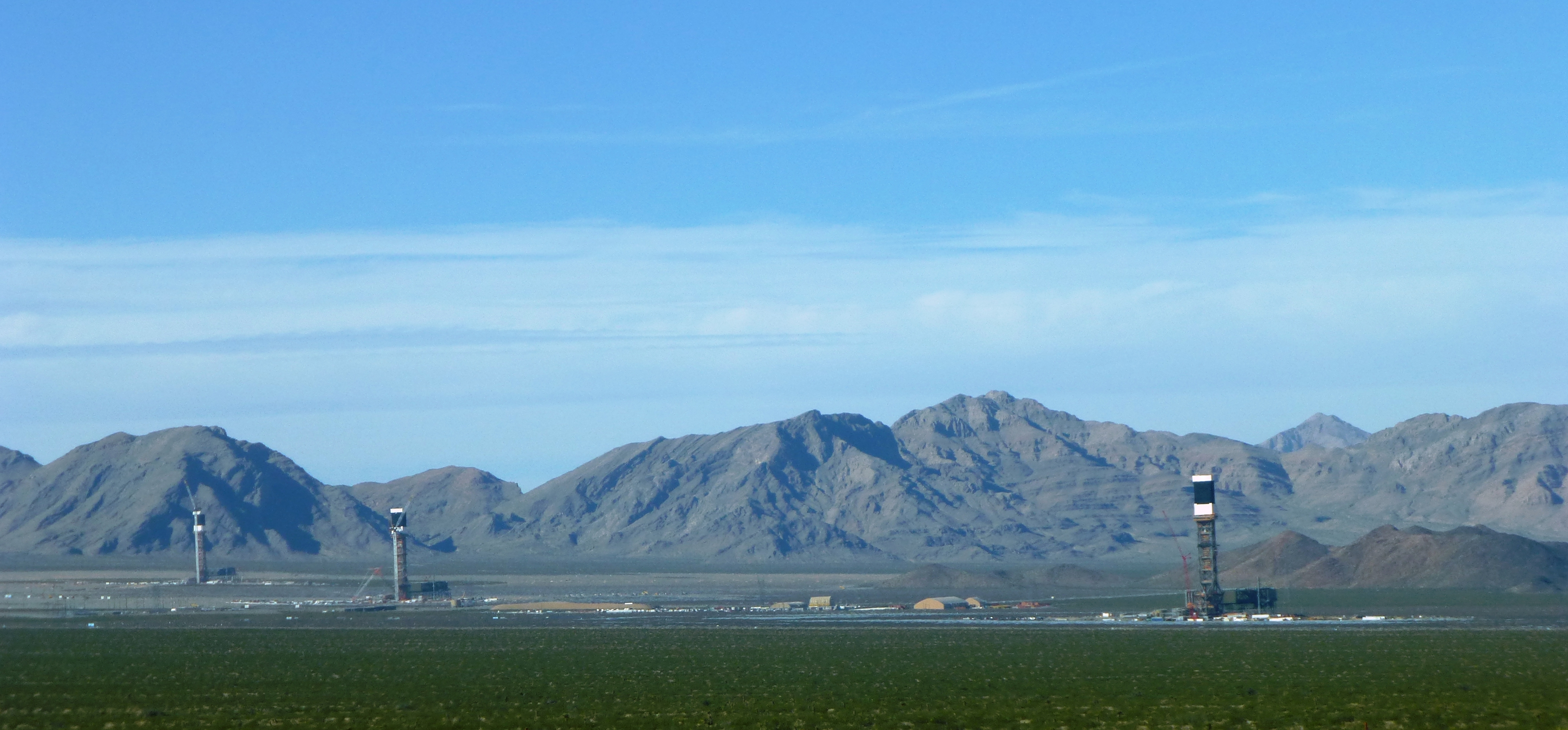
View of Ivanpah Solar Electric Generating System from Yates Well Road. The Clark Mountain Range can be seen in the distance.

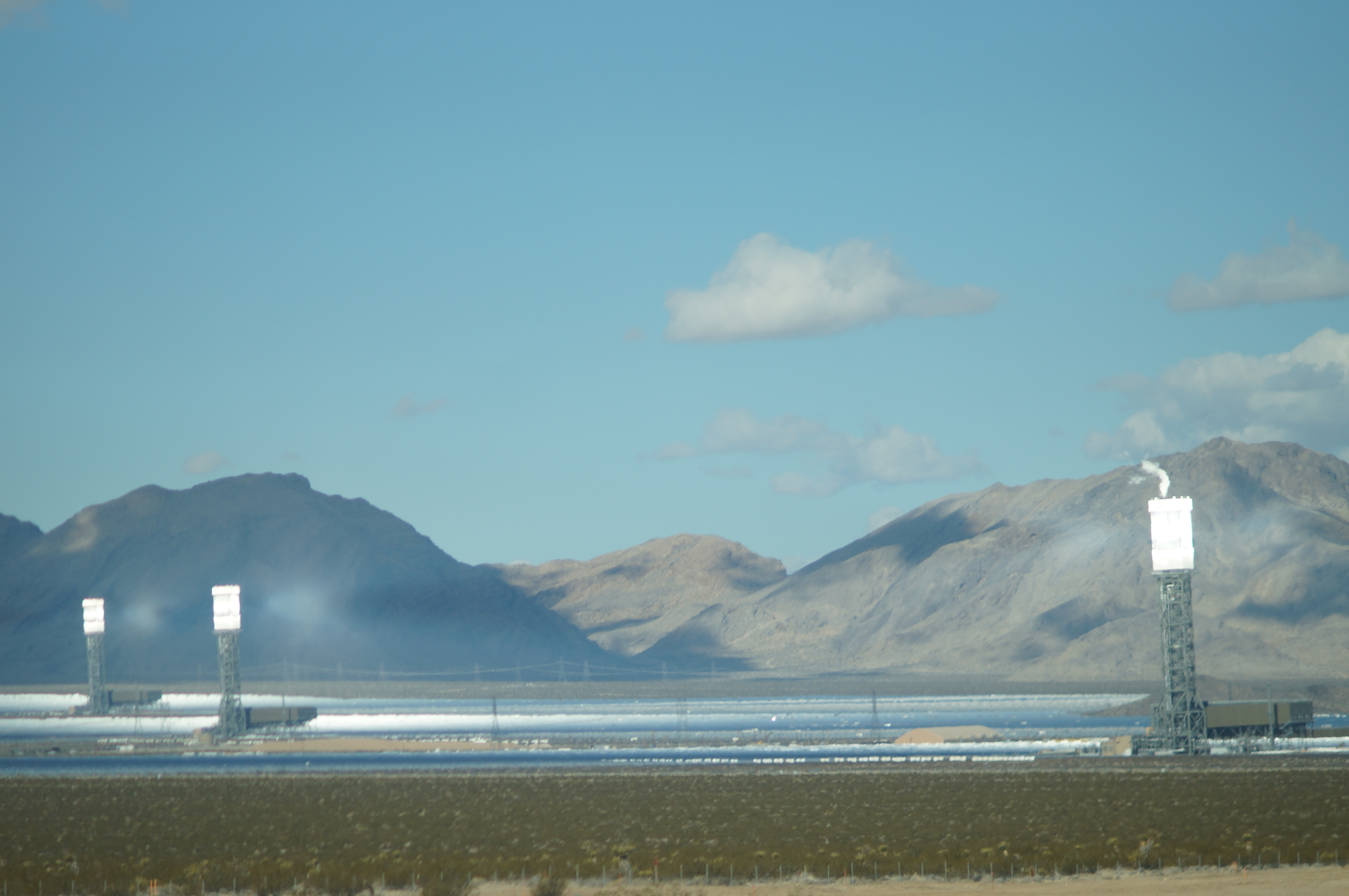
Ivanpah Solar Electric Generating System with all three towers under load, February 2014. Taken from the I-15.

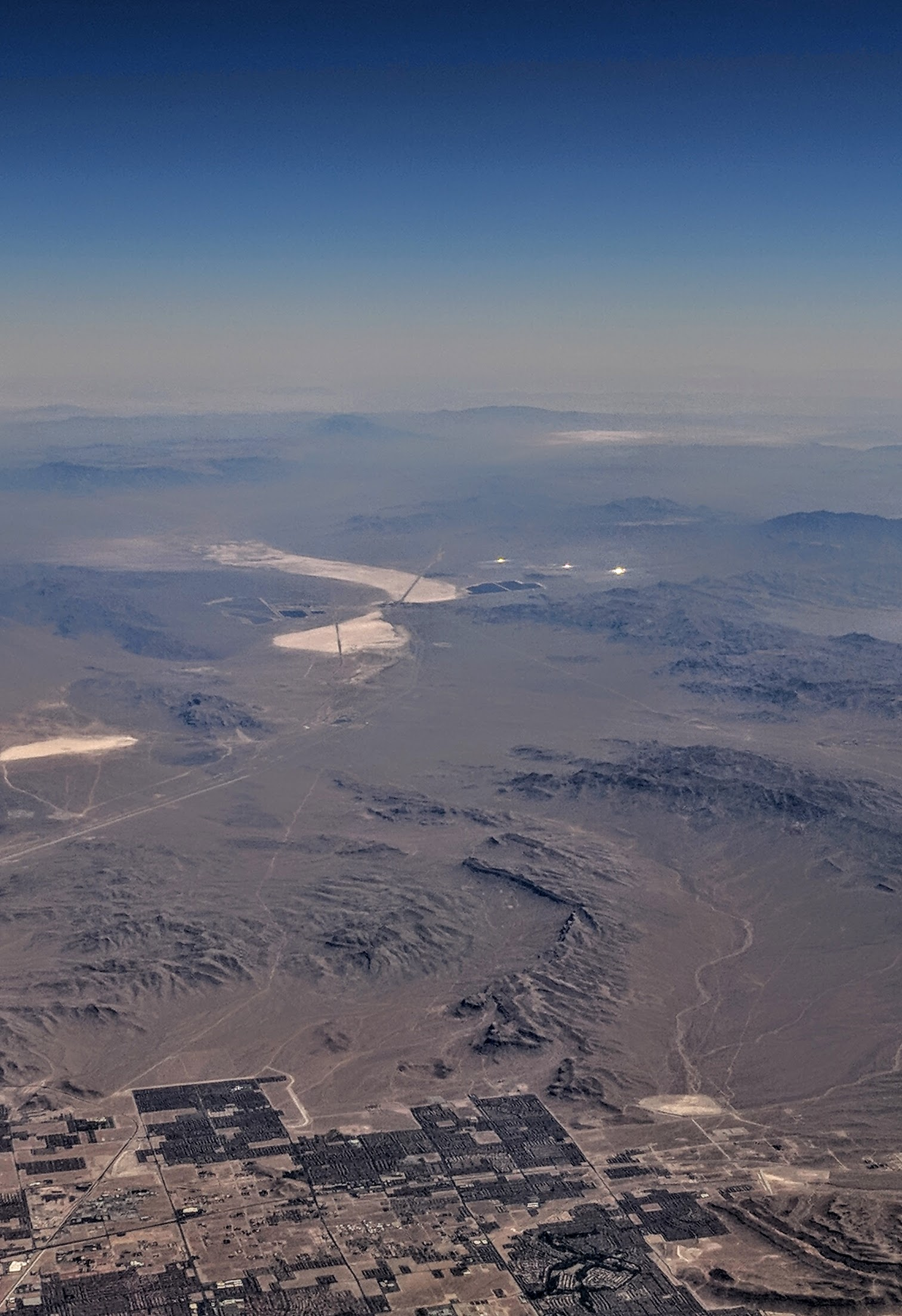
The bright spots of Ivanpah are clearly visible from above Las Vegas and further.

The Ivanpah system consists of three solar thermal power plants on 3,500 acres (1,400 ha) of public land near the California–Nevada border in the Southwestern United States. Initially it was planned with 440 MW gross on 4,000 acres (1,600 ha) of land, but then downgraded by 12%. It is west of south Interstate 15, north of Ivanpah, California, and adjacent to the Mountain Pass mine, the United States' only source of rare-earth minerals. The facility is visible from the I-15, the adjacent Mojave National Preserve, the Mesquite Wilderness, and the Stateline Wilderness. It is also visible from the Primm Valley resort area to the northeast.

Fields of heliostat mirrors focus sunlight on receivers located on centralized solar power towers. The receivers generate steam to drive specially adapted steam turbines.

For the first plant, the largest-ever fully solar-powered steam turbine generator set was ordered, with a 123 MW Siemens SST-900 single-casing reheat turbine. Siemens also supplied instrumentation and control systems. The plants use BrightSource Energy's "Luz Power Tower 550" (LPT 550) technology which heats the steam to 550 °C directly in the receivers. The plants have no storage.

Final approval for the project was granted in October 2010. On October 27, 2010, Governor of California Arnold Schwarzenegger, Interior Secretary Ken Salazar, and other dignitaries gathered in the Mojave Desert to break the ground for the construction.

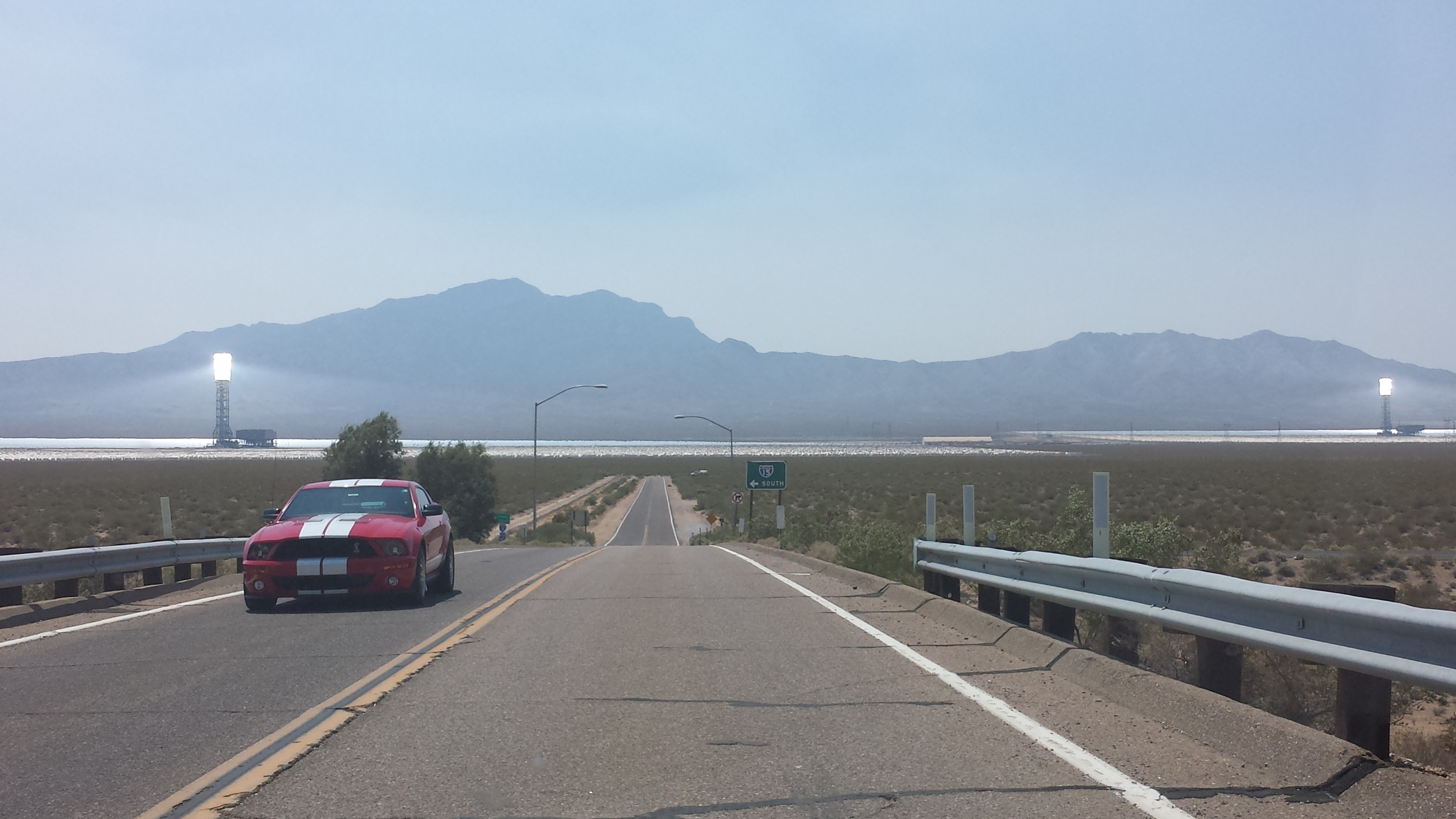
View of the Ivanpah Solar Power Facility from the Yates Well Road exit of the I-15 Freeway

The largest investor in the project was NRG Energy, a generating company based in Princeton, New Jersey. It contributed $300 million. The project also received an investment of $168 million from Google. In November 2011, Google announced that it would no longer invest in the facility due to the rapid decline of the price of photovoltaic systems. $90,000,000 in financing was provided through the EB-5 Investor Immigration program, managed in this case by CMB Regional Centers.

The project, which had a total cost of about $2.18 billion, received a $1.6 billion loan guarantee from the United States Department of Energy. The facility developed contracts to sell about two-thirds of the power it generated to the Pacific Gas and Electric Company (PG&E), and the rest to Southern California Edison (SCE). PG&E announced in 2025 that it was terminating its contracts subject to approval by regulators.

In December 2025, the CPUC unanimously rejected that agreement, citing concerns about grid reliability and wasting sunk costs. The decision requires two of the three units to remain running.

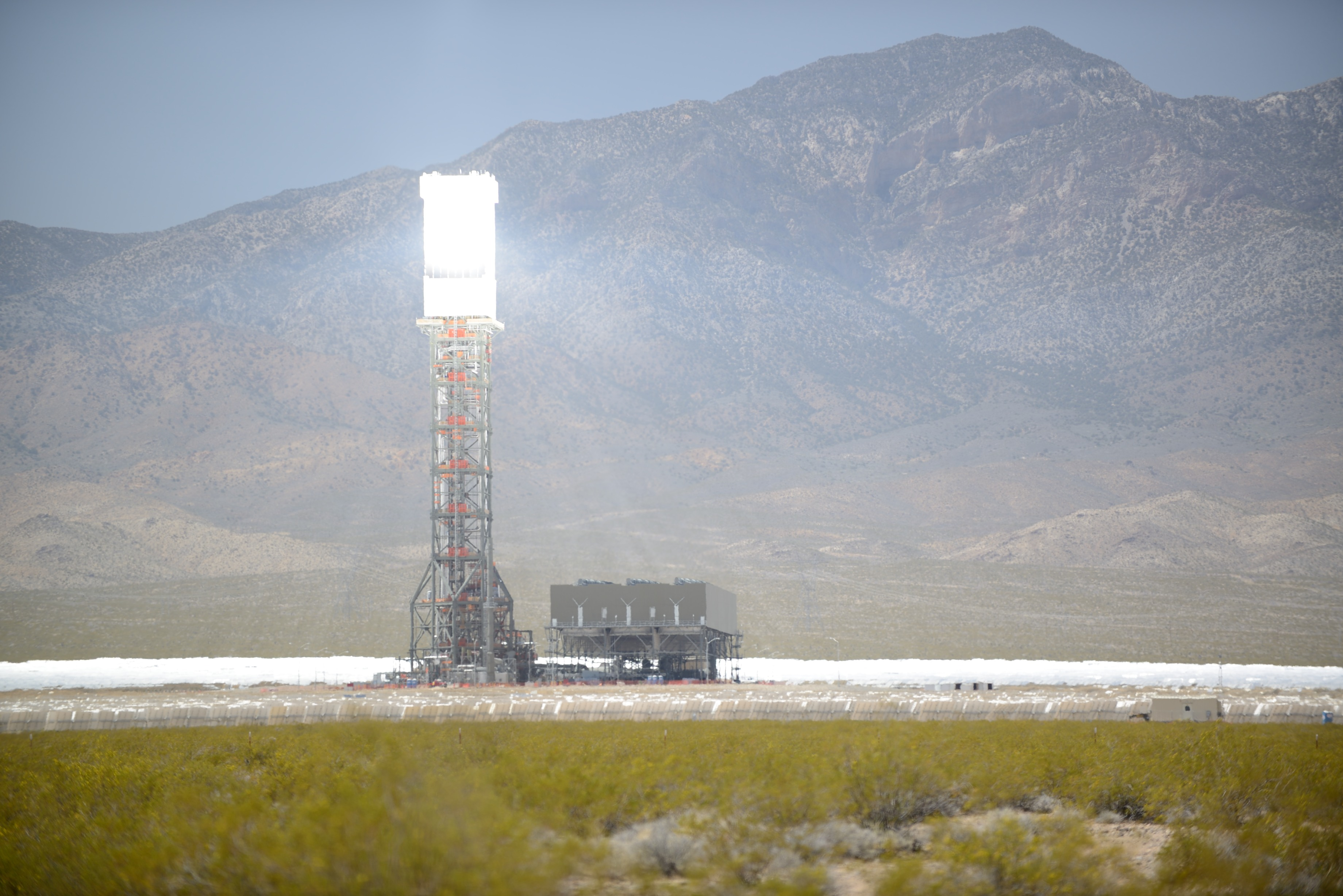
Ivanpah Solar Power Facility online

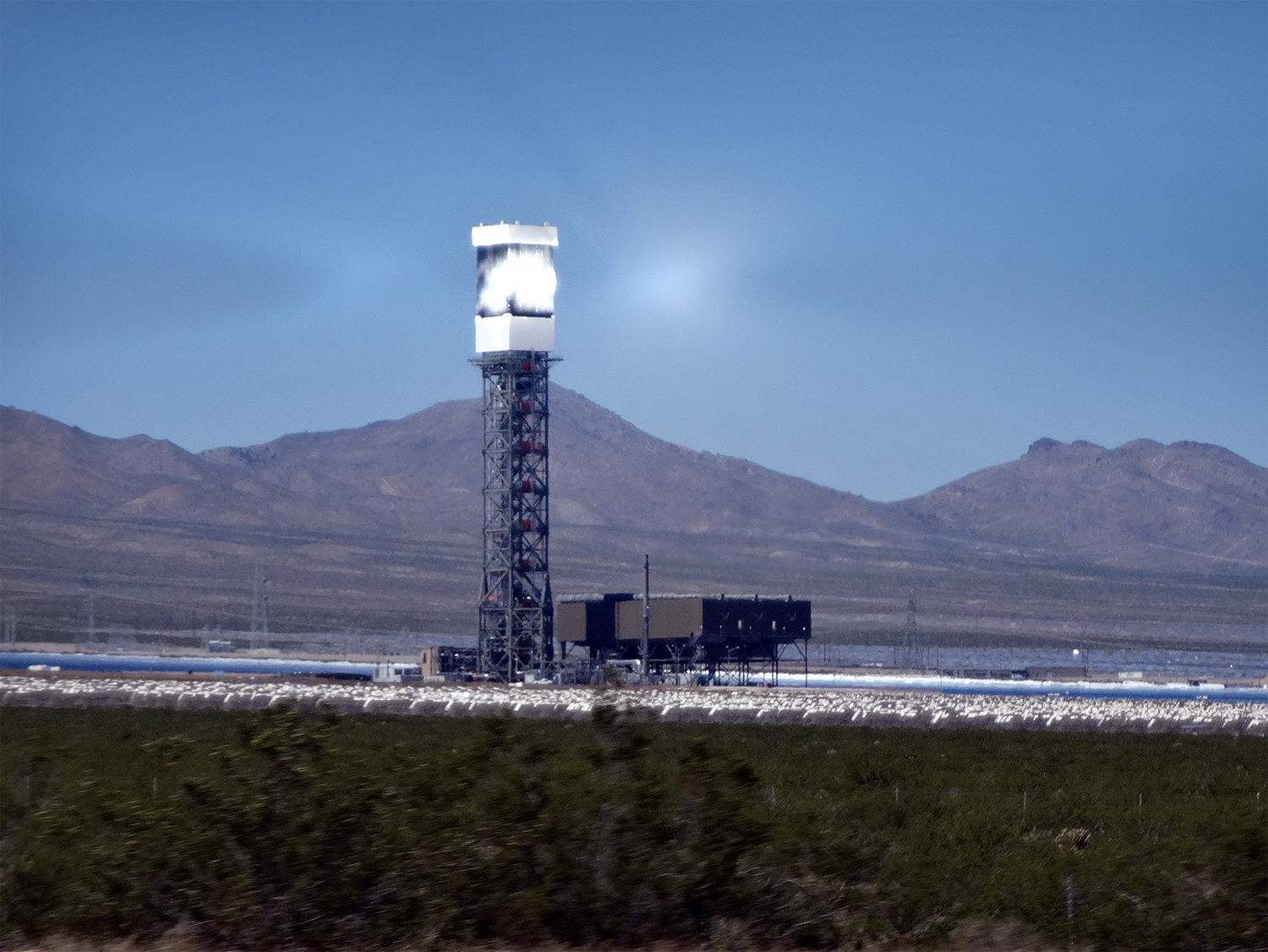
Ivanpah's eastern tower online. Note the sunlight glare on either side of the boiler.

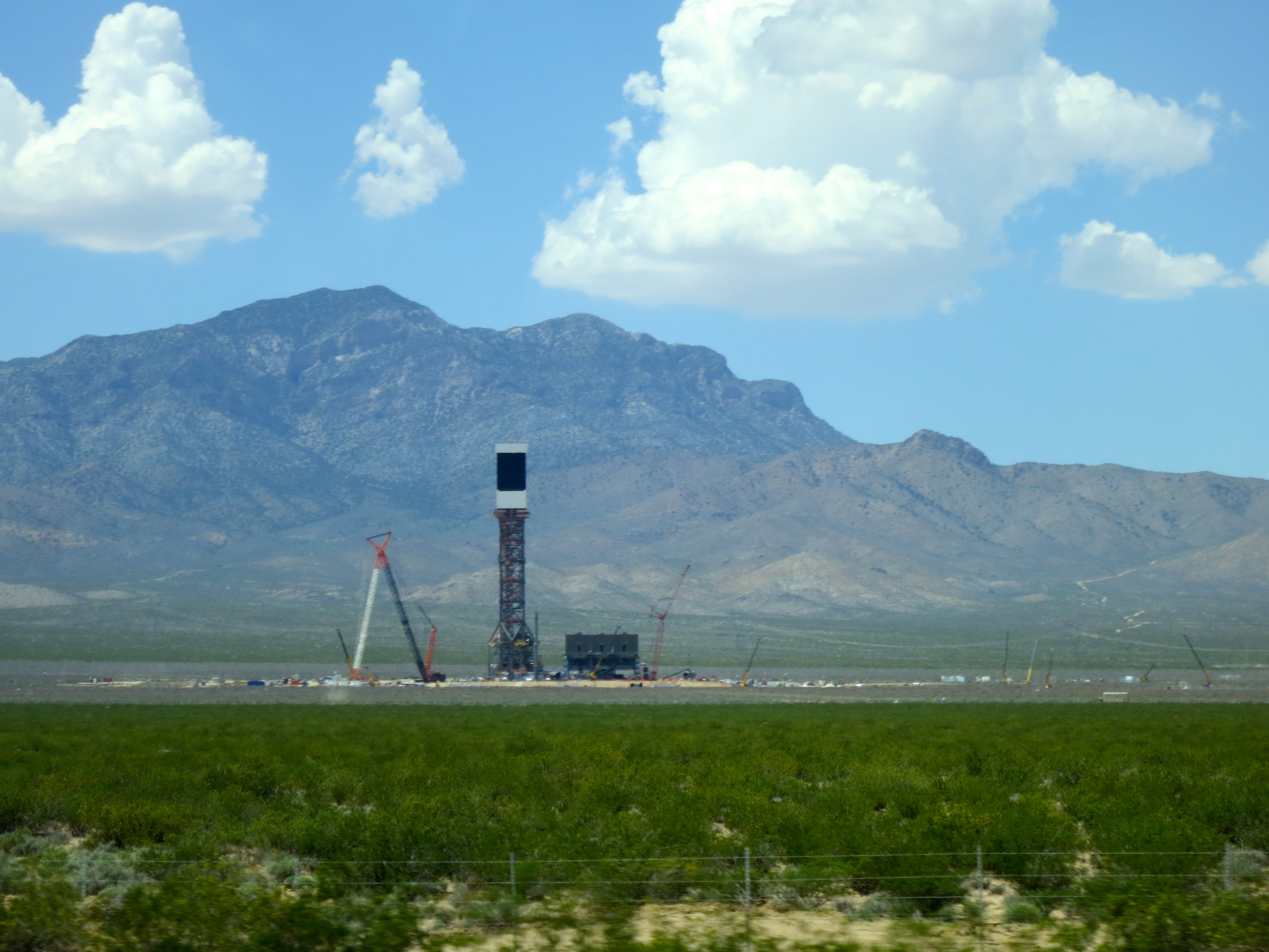
One of the three towers of the Ivanpah Solar Power Facility

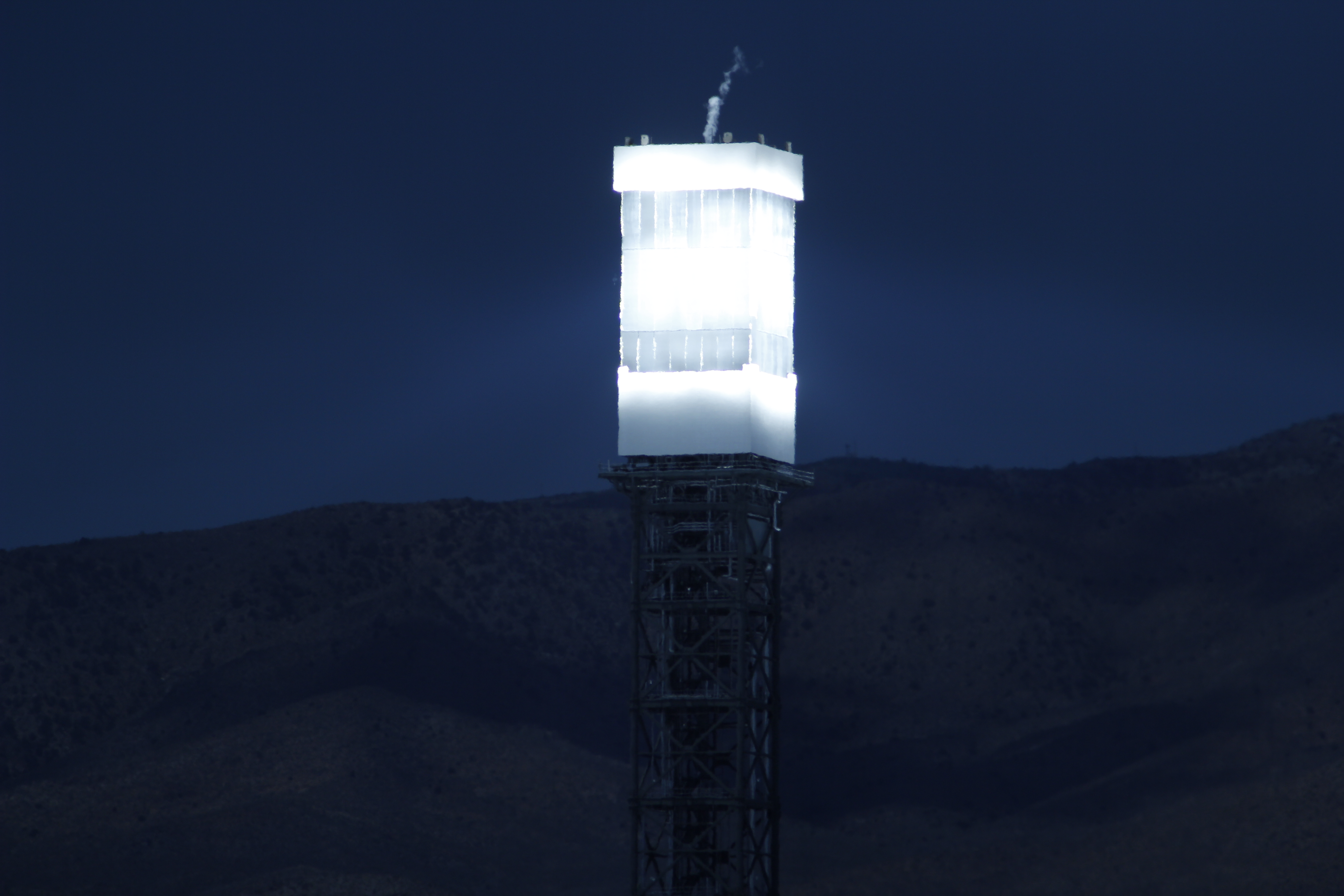
A close-up of one of the boilers taken with very short exposure

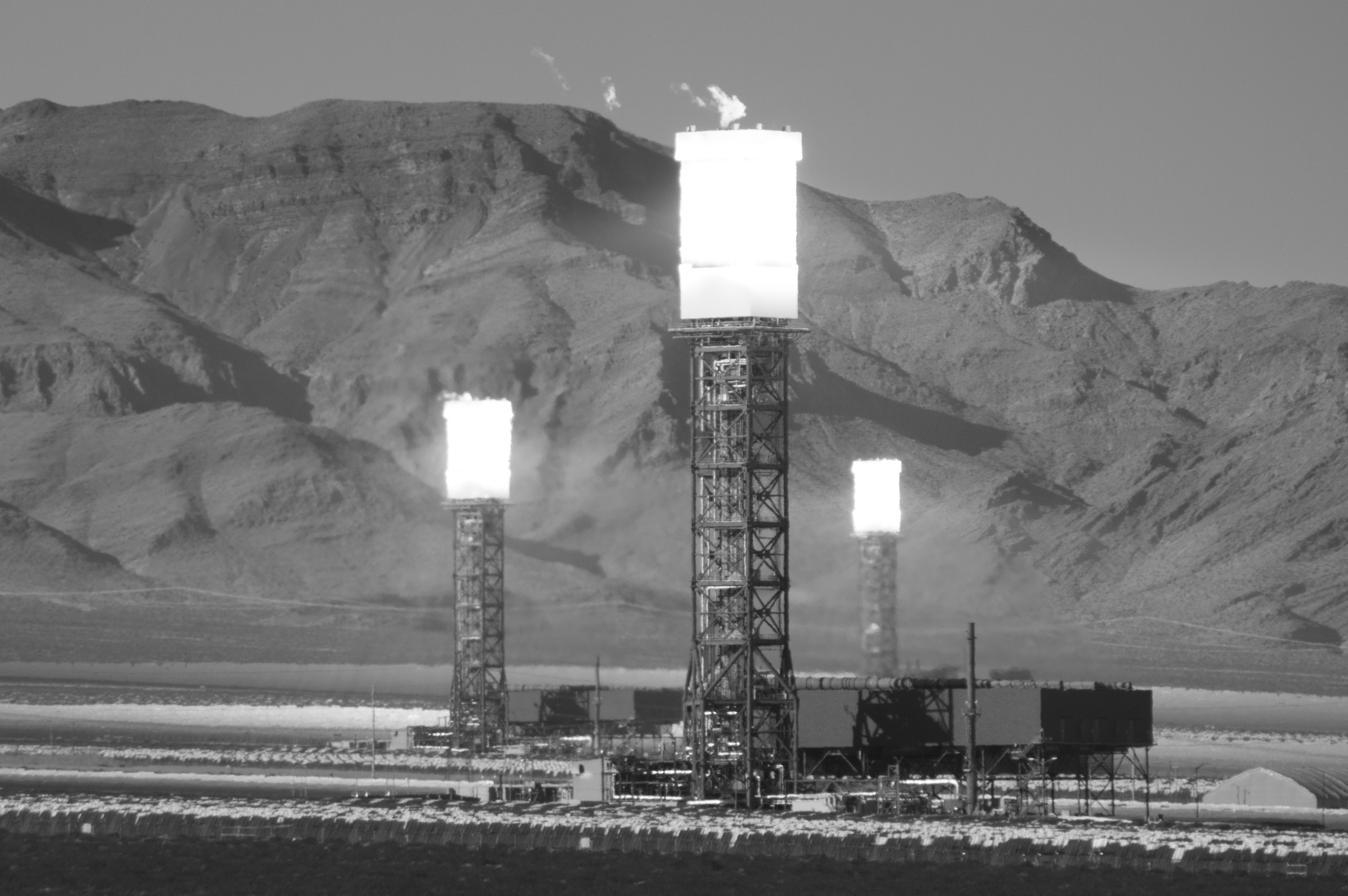
Solar towers in full operation

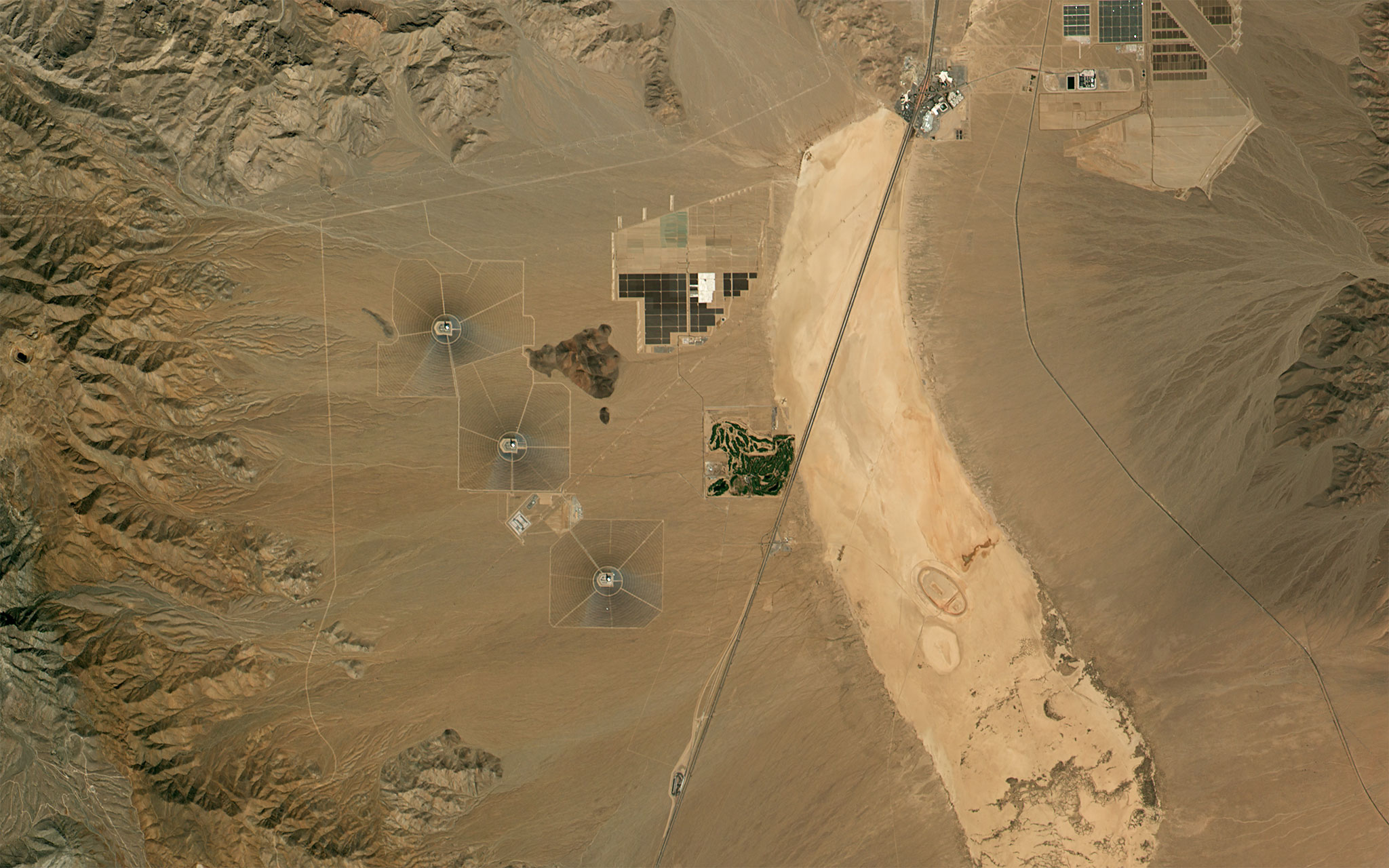
Satellite photo of Ivanpah (center)

== Fossil fuel consumption ==
The plant burns natural gas each morning to commence operation. The Wall Street Journal reported, "Instead of ramping up the plant each day before sunrise by burning one hour's worth of natural gas to generate steam, Ivanpah needs more than four times that much." On August 27, 2014, the State of California approved Ivanpah to increase its annual natural gas consumption from 328,000,000 cubic feet (9,300,000 m^{3}) of natural gas, as previously approved, to 525,000,000 cubic feet (14,900,000 m^{3}). In 2014, the plant burned 868×10^{9} British thermal units (254 GWh) of natural gas emitting 46,084 metric tons of carbon dioxide, which is nearly twice the pollution threshold at which power plants and factories in California are required to participate in the state's cap and trade program to reduce carbon emissions. If that fuel had been used in a Combined Cycle Gas Turbine (CCGT) plant, it would have generated about 124 GWh of electrical energy. The facility used that gas plus solar energy to produce 419 GWh of electrical energy (more than three times that of the referenced CCGT plant), all the while operating at well below its expected output. In 2015, the facility showed higher production numbers, with Q1 increases of 170% over the same time period in 2014.

The facility uses three Rentech Type-D water tube boilers and three night time preservation boilers. The California Energy Resources Conservation and Development Commission approved for each a stack "130 feet (40 m) high and 60 inches (1.5 m) in diameter" and consumption of 242,500 cu ft/h (6,870 m^{3}/h) of fuel.

== Economic impact ==
BrightSource estimated that the Ivanpah facility would provide 1,000 jobs at the peak of construction, 86 permanent jobs, and total economic benefits of $3 billion. Elected San Bernardino County Supervisor Brad Mitzelfelt, who represents most of the California Mojave Desert, stated that the "project would create jobs for mostly Las Vegas and electricity for mostly San Francisco".

The project received a $1.6 billion loan guarantee from the United States Department of Energy. According to Synapse Energy Economics, the estimated construction cost for the facility of $5,561.00 per kW fell between that of coal and nuclear power plants, but this does not account for the less favorable capacity factor of solar power.

In November 2014, the facility's investors applied for a $539 million federal grant to finance their federal loan.

== Performance ==
Contracted power-delivery performance of 640 GWh/year from Units 1 and 3 and 336 GWh from Unit 2 was met by 2017, following sharply reduced production in the first few years of operation, particularly in the start-up year of 2014.

In November 2014, the Associated Press reported that the facility was producing only "about half of its expected annual output". The California Energy Commission issued a statement blaming this on "clouds, jet contrails and weather". Performance improved in 2015 to about 650 GWh. However, NRG Energy said in its November quarterly report that Ivanpah would likely not meet its contractual obligations to provide power to PG&E during the year, raising the risk of default on its Power Purchase Agreement. PG&E had a contract to receive 640 GWh/year from Units 1 and 3, while SCE was supposed to receive 336 GWh from Unit 2, at a price of about $200/MWh (20¢/kWh). In March 2016, PG&E agreed not to declare the plant in default for at least four months in return for an undisclosed sum from the owners.

In June 2015, The Wall Street Journal reported, "15 months after starting up, the plant is producing just 40% of [its expected more than a million megawatt-hours of electricity each year], according to data from the U.S. Energy Department." Performance improved dramatically in the second year. CleanTechnica reported with respect to units 1 and 3 that "in 2015, PG&E customers received about 97% of Ivanpah's contracted electrons, which is a massive improvement over its first year".

By 2017, due to improvements, the plant was meeting the contract output requirements.

The steam plant was designed for 28.72% gross efficiency. The local irradiance near the area is about 7.4 kWh/m^{2}/day (annual average) for a total solar energy flow in the visible spectrum of 2.717 MWh/m^{2} yearly.

One heliostat mirror is a 75.6 square feet (7.02 m^{2}) reflecting surface, giving a total of 151.2 square feet (14.05 m^{2}) per heliostat. The total plant heliostat reflecting surface results in 173,500 heliostats × 14.05 m^{2}/heliostat = 2,437,144 m^{2}. If the mirrors could always be perpendicular to Sun's ray, based on irradiance, the intercepted solar energy flow is 2.717 MWh/m^{2}/year × 2,437,144 m^{2} = 6,621,720 MWh yearly.

=== May 2016 fire ===
On May 19, 2016, a small fire was reported when misaligned mirrors reflected sunlight into a level of Unit 3 tower not designed to collect power, requiring the tower to shut down for repairs. As another of the three power-generating units was already offline for scheduled maintenance, the plant was left with only one third of its installation functional. Unit 3 resumed operation on June 8, 2016. All three units were back in operation by June 20, 2016. Solar thermal electricity production in California peaked at 703 MW on that day, up from 452 MW on June 7 when two units were offline.

=== Awards ===
In August 2014, Ivanpah was given the "Plant of the Year" award by Power magazine. In February 2012, Ivanpah was named the CSP (Concentrating Solar Power) Project of the Year by Solar Power Generation USA.

== Environmental impacts ==
The Ivanpah installation was estimated, before operations started, to reduce carbon dioxide emissions by more than 400,000 tons annually. It was designed to minimize impacts on the natural environment compared to some photovoltaic solar facilities because the use of heliostats does not require as much grading of the land. The project was built on ecologically intact desert habitat. The facility was fenced off to keep out some terrestrial wildlife. However, birds faced the risk of collision with the heliostat mirrors or from burning in solar flux created by the mirror field.

In 2012, the National Parks Conservation Association (NPCA) issued a report on the project, citing water concerns, damage to visual resources, and impacts on important desert species. To conserve scarce desert water, LPT 550 uses air-cooling to convert steam back into water. Compared to conventional wet-cooling, this results in a 90 percent reduction in water usage. The water is then returned to the boiler in a closed process.

Another potential issue is the effect of mirror glare on airplane pilots. Additionally, "the power towers have 'receiver units' at their top on which the mirror fields focus their reflected light. During operation, these receiver units become extremely hot, such that they glow and appear brightly lit. ... Because they are high above the ground, these glowing receiver units will be a visible distraction to persons at many of the KOPs [Key Observation Points], including travelers utilizing I-15."

According to the State of California Energy Resources Conservation and Development Commission Opening Briefs regarding this project, "the project itself is visually imposing. It would cover roughly 4,000 acres [1,600 ha], most of which would be covered with mirror fields. The panoramic expanse of mirror arrays would present strong textural contrast with the intact, natural character of the desert floor [and] would rise to a height of roughly 459 feet [140 m]; an additional 10 to 15 feet [3.0 to 4.6 metres] above that height would consist of lighting to meet Federal Aviation Administration (FAA) requirements."

=== Desert tortoise ===
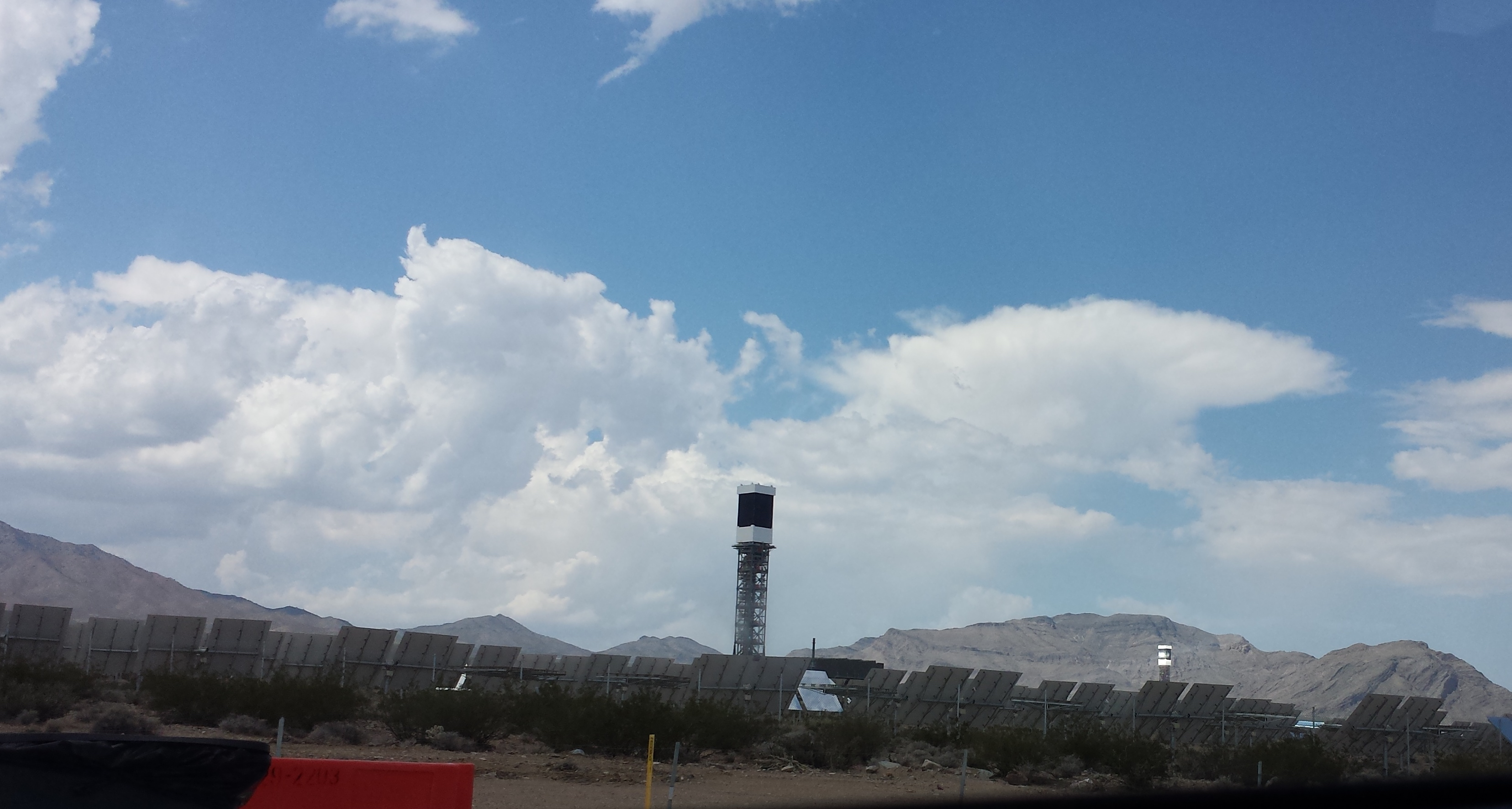
The solar power facility under construction in August 2013

The Ivanpah Solar power project was built on 6 square miles (16 km^{2}) of public land in the south central Mojave Desert. Project construction was temporarily halted in the spring of 2011 due to the suspected impacts on desert tortoises. Construction resumed when the United States Fish and Wildlife Service (USFWS) found the project was not likely to jeopardize the endangered desert tortoise. BrightSource also installed fencing to keep wildlife out of the area. In 2010, the project was scaled back from the original 440 MW design, to avoid building on the habitat of the desert tortoise.

Many desert tortoises found on the site were relocated to other parts of the Mojave Desert. However, environmentalists raised concerns that relocated tortoises were more likely to die due to the stresses involved.

=== Birds ===
During the trial of the plant in September 2013, thirty-four (34) dead birds were found at the plant. Fifteen had heavily burned feathers, which staff at the plant referred to as "streamers" because they were burned in flight by the intense radiation from the heliostat mirrors. From February through June 2014, a team of biologists monitoring the number of bird deaths reported a total of 290.

In April 2014, the USFWS reported that 141 dead birds, including peregrine falcon, barn owl and yellow-rumped warbler had been collected at Ivanpah in October 2013. Forty-seven of the birds' deaths were attributed to solar flux. According to a report by the Associated Press, "Ivanpah might act as a 'mega-trap' for wildlife, with the bright light of the plant attracting insects, which in turn attract insect-eating birds that fly to their death in the intensely focused light rays." Bird kill mitigation strategies were considered, including proven, environmentally safe technologies such as avian radars and LRADs to keep birds away from the site, covering ponds to discourage waterbirds from loitering, and clearing additional land around the plant to make it less attractive and more visible to birds in flight. Some of the bird deaths occurred when the plant was in standby-mode, and the mirrors were focused above the tower. This issue was resolved by spreading the focus wider, below damaging intensity.

In April 2015 The Wall Street Journal reported that "biologists working for the state estimated that 3,500 birds died at Ivanpah in the span of a year, many of them burned alive while flying through a part of the solar installment where air temperatures can reach 1,000 degrees Fahrenheit [540 °C]".

In late 2015, Brightsource released the results of the first full year monitoring bird and bat deaths at the Ivanpah solar plant. The company reported that during a year of study supervised by the California Division of Wildlife, the number of observed bird deaths, adjusted upward to account for inefficiencies of the carcass-counting, were around 3,500 bird deaths per year caused by the Ivanpah solar plant. The Ivanpah plant took steps to further reduce bird deaths.

The initial reports of high avian casualties have been disputed ever since initial reports surfaced. In September 2014, for example, Renewable Energy World suggested "With its claim of 28,000 dead birds from Ivanpah, the Associated Press syndicated a story, spreading alarm about concentrated solar power (CSP) plants, which was not grounded in facts, but on one opponent's speculation."

In September 2016, federal biologists said about 6,000 birds die from collisions or immolation annually while chasing flying insects around the facility's towers.

Ivanpah was covered in the 2019 documentary Planet of the Humans.

=== Plants ===
In addition to impacts on wildlife populations, research has examined potential effects on plant genetic diversity near the facility. A 2023 population genomics study of Mojave milkweed sampled in and around the Ivanpah Solar Electric Generating System found clear genetic differentiation among populations over small spatial scales. Indicating that even plant groups near each other may represent genetically distinct populations. The study concluded that land-cover changes associated with solar development may affect long-term genetic diversity and persistence of sensitive desert plant species.

== Production ==
Ivanpah Solar electric production is as follows (in megawatt-hours, MWh).

=== Ivanpah 1 (126 MW gross) ===
Net electricity production (all) [MWh]
Year	Jan	Feb	Mar	Apr	May	Jun	Jul	Aug	Sept	Oct	Nov	Dec	Sun	NG	Total
2014	5,632	4,460	4,946	9,130	15,879	23,722	12,277	16,807	19,743	17,455	15,993	5,922	151,966	0	151,966
2015	4,448	16,471	20,010	25,281	12,380	25,126	19,575	23,404	21,333	11,813	16,230	13,904	201,075	8,902	209,975
2016	7,599	23,686	18,427	13,284	26,006	32,875	31,796	24,403	26,860	20,616	19,663	10,440	243,479	12,176	255,655
2017	11,310	11,699	12,283	11,656	28,709	34,797	21,742	23,437	24,803	28,777	14,736	15,577	228,136	11,390	239,526
2018	16,881	9,714	18,825	14,019	19,704	36,206	21,400	26,060	29,267	20,173	18,055	12,172	231,142	11,334	242,476
2019	13,784	2,178	13,823	20,270	20,031	32,266	32,026	32,450	24,140	27,333	16,380	8,356	234,681	8,798	243,037
2020	12,350	17,961	14,547	22,355	33,691	30,616	38,060	33,299	27,324	27,041	18,176	9,713	270,941	14,192	285,133
2021	13,103	7,958	19,132	24,609	27,896	23,319	16,988	26,664	24,904	15,777	22,027	12,774	223,357	11,794	235,151
2022	15,898	8,191	18,717	26,207	20,133	31,045	18,183	16,488	17,543	25,338	15,108	9,920	217,597	5,174	222,771
Total													2,002,374	83,760	2,085,690

=== Ivanpah 2 (133 MW gross) ===
Net electricity production (all) [MWh]
Year	Jan	Feb	Mar	Apr	May	Jun	Jul	Aug	Sept	Oct	Nov	Dec	Sun	NG	Total
2014	2,167	1,304	5,604	9,596	13,020	15,825	14,350	12,812	14,446	18,157	15,350	6,632	129,264	0	129,263
2015	6,909	8,915	19,585	24,364	17,243	26,206	18,953	23,900	22,628	12,477	22,222	15,642	210,515	8,529	219,044
2016	10,070	17,615	19,436	5,626	0	9,359	33,386	25,281	25,918	20,389	21,012	11,590	190,412	9,270	199,682
2017	13,381	9,220	16,754	13,359	29,201	22,800	22,181	20,204	25,708	29,253	16,577	17,736	226,850	9,974	236,824
2018	13,536	16,429	20,399	21,254	29,246	39,354	20,599	28,467	32,364	21,375	20,436	13,595	264,009	13,045	277,054
2019	15,085	13,207	12,635	19,331	22,647	34,930	33,856	36,735	25,343	30,832	19,310	7,731	258,458	13,184	271,642
2020	16,180	5,044	5,297	21,517	37,645	33,438	39,333	34,852	29,915	26,896	20,827	11,601	269,143	13,402	282,545
2021	13,811	10,769	21,341	30,297	28,082	25,521	19,691	29,712	26,244	17,027	19,548	10,302	242,094	10,251	252,345
2022	16,683	10,167	21,390	27,177	35,487	33,871	23,178	17,420	23,432	28,859	17,780	11,903	261,333	6,014	267,347
Total													2,052,078	83,669	2,135,747

=== Ivanpah 3 (133 MW gross) ===
Net electricity production (all) [MWh]
Year	Jan	Feb	Mar	Apr	May	Jun	Jul	Aug	Sept	Oct	Nov	Dec	Sun	NG	Total
2014	2,686	3,866	9,409	6,107	15,885	24,728	9,340	14,451	9,562	20,401	15,834	5,587	137,856	0	137,856
2015	10,531	4,887	17,495	25,659	18,333	26,202	23,153	25,502	22,186	12,681	22,022	15,452	215,573	8,530	224,103
2016	7,770	25,953	20,546	19,539	17,430	23,487	33,667	15,947	29,437	20,307	21,377	12,242	236,684	11,018	247,702
2017	13,164	12,909	21,605	15,574	29,103	40,080	22,471	24,001	24,730	19,755	9,488	10,618	231,913	11,875	243,788
2018	18,456	17,820	19,957	26,787	27,488	40,177	21,198	24,047	30,075	20,848	19,380	10,093	266,338	9,988	276,326
2019	6,342	11,818	21,794	19,744	22,029	34,803	31,638	32,214	23,251	26,683	17,700	9,431	246,784	10,751	257,535
2020	6,818	18,825	13,534	23,023	36,486	32,562	36,500	32,983	28,786	27,625	19,685	11,796	275,733	12,890	288,623
2021	5,590	19,661	21,859	31,740	32,646	15,057	19,676	29,284	23,155	17,445	22,478	13,629	240,246	11,974	252,220
2022	11,226	22,714	24,675	28,162	35,889	31,176	22,998	19,173	24,216	27,802	19,032	11,973	273,694	5,352	279,046
Total													2,124,821	82,378	2,207,199

=== Ivanpah total (392 MW gross) ===
Net electricity production (all) [MWh]
Year	Jan	Feb	Mar	Apr	May	Jun	Jul	Aug	Sept	Oct	Nov	Dec	Sun	NG	Total
2014	10,485	9,630	19,959	24,833	44,784	64,275	35,967	44,070	43,751	56,013	47,177	18,141	419,085	0	419,085
2015	21,888	30,273	57,090	75,304	47,956	77,534	61,681	72,806	66,147	36,971	60,474	44,998	627,161	25,961	653,122
2016	25,439	67,254	58,409	38,449	43,436	65,721	98,849	65,631	82,215	61,312	62,052	34,272	670,575	32,464	703,039
2017	38,305	33,828	50,642	40,589	87,013	97,677	66,664	67,642	75,241	77,805	40,801	43,931	686,899	33,239	720,138
2018	48,873	43,963	59,181	62,060	76,438	115,737	63,197	78,754	91,706	62,396	57,871	35,860	761,489	34,367	795,856
2019	35,211	27,203	48,252	59,345	64,707	101,999	97,520	101,399	72,734	84,848	53,478	25,518	739,481	32,733	772,214
2020	35,348	41,830	33,378	66,895	107,822	96,616	113,893	101,134	86,025	81,562	58,688	33,110	815,817	40,484	856,301
2021	32,504	38,388	62,332	86,646	88,624	63,897	56,355	85,660	74,303	50,249	64,053	36,705	705,697	34,019	739,716
2022	43,807	41,072	64,782	81,546	91,519	96,092	64,359	53,081	65,191	81,999	51,920	33,796	752,624	16,540	769,164
Total													6,178,828	249,807	6,428,635

Ivanpah was advertised as designed to produce 940,000 MWh of electricity per year, based on its nameplate capacity and assumed capacity factor. In its second year of operation, Ivanpah's production of 653,122 MWh of net electricity was 69.5 percent of this value, ramping up from 44.6 percent in the first year. The commissioning of a new thermal plants requires up to four years to achieve 100% operating level, from the first grid connection to full production. In its seventh year (2020), the annual production was 91.1% of its advertised value.

== Fossil fuel use ==
Ivanpah Solar's use of gas is as follows, expressed in million British thermal units (Btu) as reported. For comparison to the above charts, 1 MWh is about 3.4 million Btu.

=== Ivanpah 1 ===
Natural gas consumption (million Btu)
Year	Jan	Feb	Mar	Apr	May	Jun	Jul	Aug	Sept	Oct	Nov	Dec	Total
2014	31,760	18,369	9,703	22,767	27,198	59,739	37,609	24,261	24,387	14,670	NR	NR	270,463
2015	8,249	28,789	29,352	43,618	32,783	49,351	50,815	45,301	38,393	20,485	30,577	33,405	411,118
2016	25,620	37,072	52,382	27,248	53,663	59,477	59,281	48,803	38,492	32,974	24,621	21,420	481,053
2017	28,741	28,074	23,267	40,726	26,001	58,778	52,522	49,036	50,714	20,252	20,901	15,212	357,859
2018	36,314	15,816	35,324	24,087	30,421	70,159	63,494	71,117	35,154	29,440	11,153	30,804	453,283
2019	38,476	10,505	31,693	41,240	n/a	n/a	n/a	n/a	n/a	n/a	n/a	n/a	121,914
Total													1,942,972

=== Ivanpah 2 ===
Natural gas consumption (million Btu)
Year	Jan	Feb	Mar	Apr	May	Jun	Jul	Aug	Sept	Oct	Nov	Dec	Total
2014	41,657	13,645	18,319	16,234	21,420	34,324	38,984	22,105	22,100	12,976	13,663	19,446	274,873
2015	14,630	19,544	32,438	29,600	42,063	49,999	39,171	43,540	39,894	24,949	33,994	37,370	407,192
2016	36,861	29,874	49,996	14,780	0	21,706	52,315	38,057	34,092	34,587	29,525	23,088	364,881
2017	28,550	26,091	34,818	60,626	30,140	40,428	43,744	23,295	42,716	28,157	24,562	19,038	402,165
2018	32,525	24,106	36,828	23,580	42,921	56,040	52,336	82,818	74,222	28,563	11,882	22,839	497,660
2019	42,768	14,567	22,498	39,362	n/a	n/a	n/a	n/a	n/a	n/a	n/a	n/a	119,195
Total													1,923,932

=== Ivanpah 3 ===
Natural gas consumption (million Btu)
Year	Jan	Feb	Mar	Apr	May	Jun	Jul	Aug	Sept	Oct	Nov	Dec	Total
2014	29,309	18,498	22,532	13,624	25,321	56,292	33,508	26,337	21,487	15,390	NR	NR	262,298
2015	17,473	8,460	29,072	38,642	43,708	48,695	40,115	60,249	36,547	20,547	44,193	39,975	427,676
2016	36,645	41,799	52,801	42,714	27,006	41,573	52,577	22,031	33,361	34,512	29,580	29,875	444,474
2017	30,930	27,660	32,173	35,459	26,456	65,677	47,956	43,363	52,544	15,867	11,493	11,945	401,523
2018	36,667	28,583	57,746	53,768	7,086	59,954	21,139	35,930	36,435	21,661	5,918	13,448	378,335
2019	14,887	22,456	39,329	31,723	n/a	n/a	n/a	n/a	n/a	n/a	n/a	n/a	108,395
Total													1,900,858

=== Ivanpah total ===
Natural gas consumption (million Btu)
Year	Jan	Feb	Mar	Apr	May	Jun	Jul	Aug	Sept	Oct	Nov	Dec	Total
2014	102,726	50,512	50,554	52,625	73,939	150,355	110,101	72,703	67,974	43,036	NR	NR	774,525
2015	40,352	56,793	90,862	111,860	118,554	148,045	130,101	149,090	114,834	65,981	108,764	110,750	1,245,986
2016	99,126	108,745	155,179	84,742	80,669	122,756	164,173	108,891	105,945	102,073	83,626	74,383	1,290,308
2017	88,221	81,825	90,258	136,811	82,597	164,883	144,222	115,694	145,974	64,276	56,956	46,195	1,217,912
2018	105,506	68,505	129,898	110,435	80,428	186,153	136,969	189,865	145,811	79,664	28,953	67,091	1,329,278
2019	96,131	47,528	93,520	112,325	n/a	n/a	n/a	n/a	n/a	n/a	n/a	n/a	349,504
Total													5,790,918

NR = Not reported
n/a = Not available

== In popular culture ==
The facility inspired American rock band The Fray to name their 2014 album Helios. The album art is an aerial photograph of the plant, which also features in the lyric video for "Love Don't Die".

== See also ==
- Blythe Solar Power Project
- List of solar thermal power stations
- SEGS
- Solar power plants in the Mojave Desert
- Solyndra
