= Barnwell and Searchlight Railway =

Overview
- Headquarters: Los Angeles, California
- Locale: Manvel (Barnwell), California - Searchlight, Nevada
- Dates of operation: April 16, 1906–December 28, 1911

Technical
- Track gauge: 4 ft 8 1/2 in (1,435 mm) standard gauge

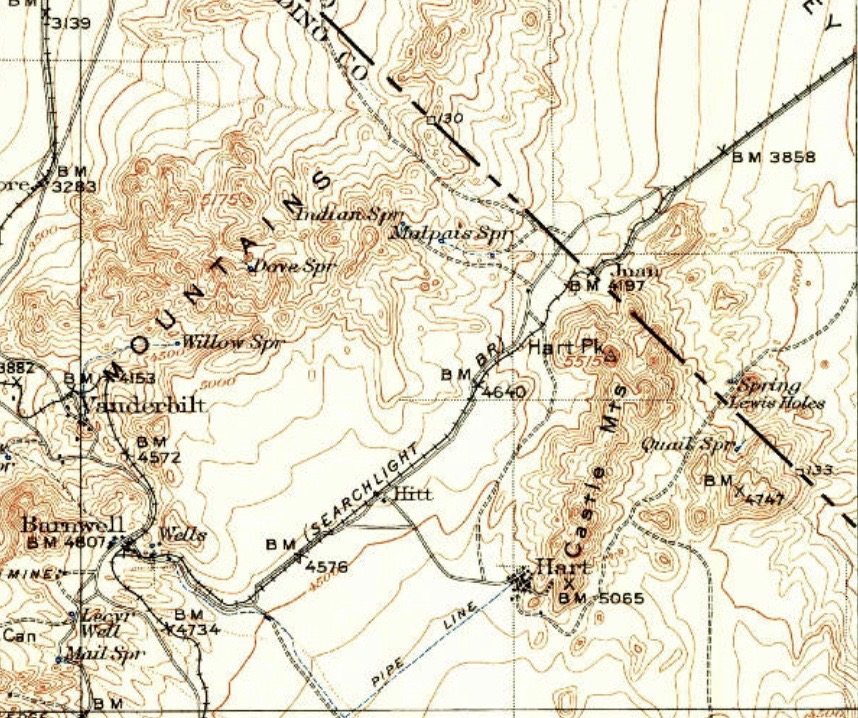
Route in 1911

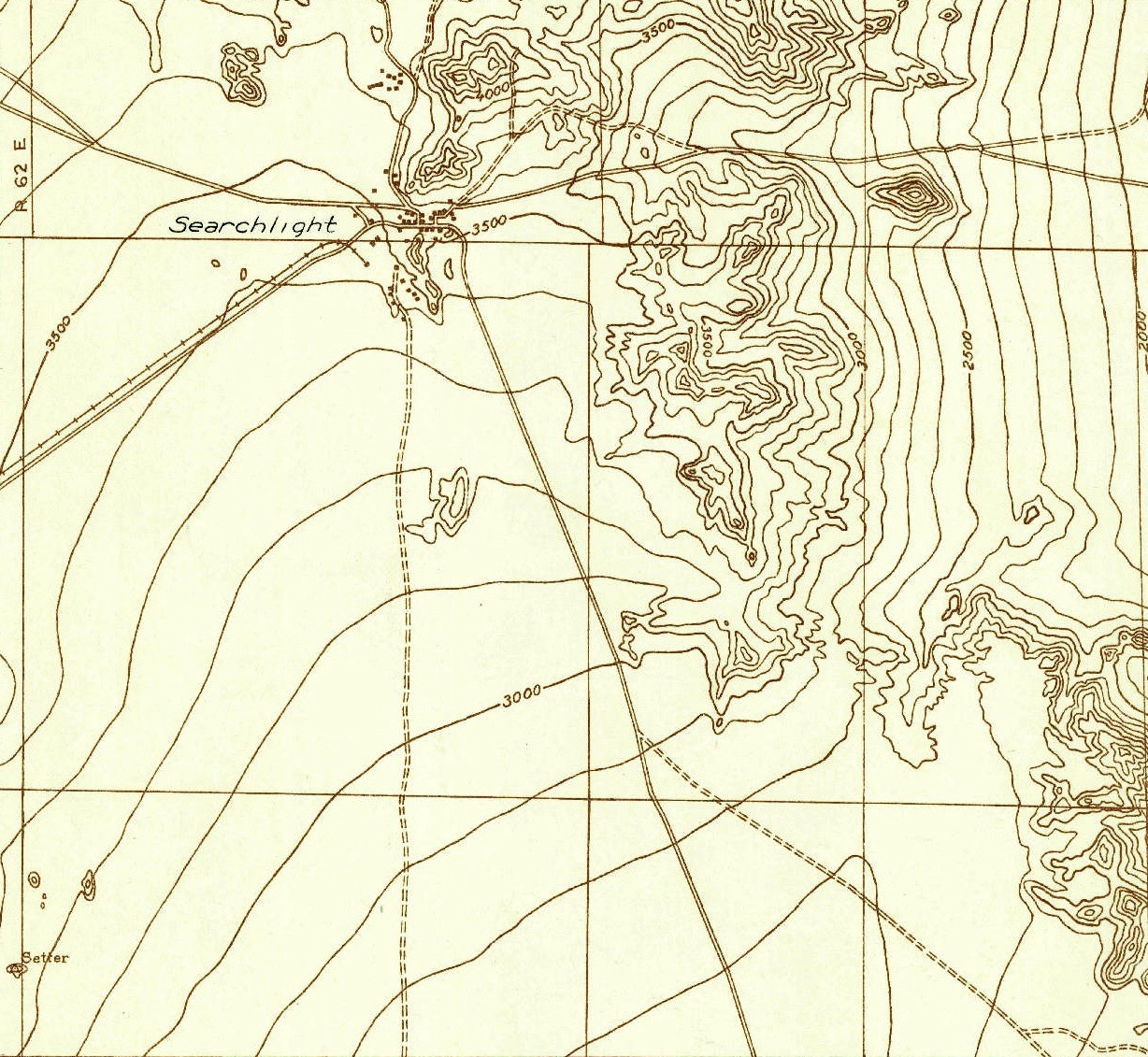
Eastern portion of route into Searchlight

The Barnwell and Searchlight Railway is a defunct 23-mile (37 km) short-line railroad that operated from 1906 to 1911. The railroad ran from Barnwell, California to Searchlight, Nevada. It was always operated by the Atchison, Topeka and Santa Fe Railway.

== Construction of line ==
The discovery of gold in Searchlight, Nevada in 1897 led to a gold rush in the area. In 1900 the Quartette Mining Company was formed and two years later the area was booming with activity and peaking in 1907 at a population of 5,000. It was at the peak of this boom that the Barnwell & Searchlight Railway was formed.

The railway was constructed between May 1, 1906 and March 31, 1907 and was built to serve the Searchlight gold mining district at Searchlight, Nevada. On April 7, 1907, only 7 days after construction was completed the railway was leased to and became a non-operating subsidiary of ATSF.

== Consolidated into California, Arizona and Santa Fe Railway ==
On December 28, 1911 the Barnwell & Searchlight was consolidated into ATSF's non-operating subsidiary, the California, Arizona and Santa Fe Railway.

== Abandonment of line ==
On September 23, 1923 the line's track was washed out and was abandoned on February 18, 1924. The town during this time was dying and by 1927 the population was only 50 people.

== Timeline ==
- April 1906 Railroad formed
- May 1906 Grading begins
- September 1906 Laying rails begins
- March 1907 Construction completed
- April 1907 Leased to ATSF as a non-operating subsidiary
- December 1911 Railroad is consolidated into ATSF's non-operating subsidiary California, Arizona and Santa Fe Railway
- September 1923 Line washed out
- February 1924 Line abandoned

== Interchange at Barnwell ==
At Barnwell, the Barnwell and Searchlight branched from ATSF's non-operating subsidiary, the California Eastern Railway. The California Eastern ran south from North Ivanpah, California - Leastalk (Ivanpah on the San Pedro, Los Angeles and Salt Lake Railroad interchange) - Barnwell (Barnwell & Searchlight interchange) - Blackburn - Blake (Goffs on the ATSF mainline from Los Angeles - Needles).

== Route ==
- Barnwell (Interchange with California Eastern Railway)
- Hart
- Juan (Nevada)
- Searchlight

== See also ==
- List of defunct California railroads
- List of defunct Nevada railroads
