= LORAN-C transmitter Searchlight =

LORAN-C transmitter Searchlight was the Yankee secondary of the U.S. West Coast LORAN-C Chain (GRI 9940) and the Whiskey secondary of the South Central U.S. Chain (GRI 9610). The station, established in 1976, consisted of four 700-foot (210 m) transmission towers. It transmitted 540 kW from 13.5 miles (21.7 km) south of Searchlight, Nevada. There were five active duty and 2 reserve duty Coast Guard personnel stationed at LORSTA Searchlight. The station's Officer in Charge was a Chief Electronics Technician.

The station was closed on February 8, 2010, as a budget cut. The station, and all of the others, were considered to be obsolete with the general availability of GPS systems.

The four masts were demolished sometime between January 25, 2014 and January 14, 2015.

== Notes ==
35°19′18.31″N 114°48′16.88″W
