= Vanderbilt, California =

Vanderbilt
- Ghost town
- Location within the state of California Vanderbilt (the United States)
- Coordinates: 35°19′38″N 115°14′59″W
- Country: United States
- State: California
- County: San Bernardino
- Time zone: UTC-8 (Pacific (PST))
  - Summer (DST): UTC-7 (PDT)
- GNIS feature ID: 1661625

Vanderbilt was a short-lived gold mining town located in San Bernardino County, California, United States. It existed between 1893 and 1895. At its peak it may have had a population of about 400 people.

== Location ==
Vanderbilt was located at 35° 19' 38.20" -115° 14' 59.14" (WGS84) on the California and Nevada border, which today is part of Mojave National Preserve.

== History ==
In January 1891, Native American Robert Black struck gold ore on the north slope of the New York Mountains, about 40 mi (64 km) north of Goffs, California, on the Santa Fé Railway. A mining camp was soon established at nearby Vanderbilt Spring. The discovery of additional gold-rich veins in the fall of 1892 set off a rush to the area.

By January 1893, 150 people were living at Vanderbilt camp, which contained 50 tents, two stores, one saloon, three restaurants, a lodging house, a blacksmith shop, and a stable. In 1883 a post office was established in February, W. A. Nash was appointed justice of the peace in May, and a Rail service to Manvel, five-miles to the south, commenced in August.

Vanderbilt's population probably peaked in 1894, at about 400. The business district contained three saloons, two barbers, a Chinese restaurant and two other eating houses, two meat markets, a stationery and fruit store, one lodging house, two blacksmiths, and three well-stocked general stores. William McFarlane, one of the pioneers of Ivanpah, owned an interest in one of them, in which he ran the post office and owned a drugstore.

According to Earp Historians, Virgil Earp, famed brother of Wyatt Earp who was also involved in the gunfight behind the OK Corral, owned the only two-story building in town. It operated as a hotel and saloon, and according to Allie Earp, church services and dances were also held inside.

During 1894, two ten-stamp mills were constructed to serve the two principal mines in the district, the Gold Bronze and Boomerang. At nearly the same time the mills were completed, water was struck in the mines. After hitting water, the character of the ore changed, and being unable to recover the gold in the ore, the mills were shut down. By the end of 1895, most of the town's businesses had closed and most of the population had left.
