= Searchlight, Nevada =

Unincorporated town in Nevada, US

- Unincorporated town
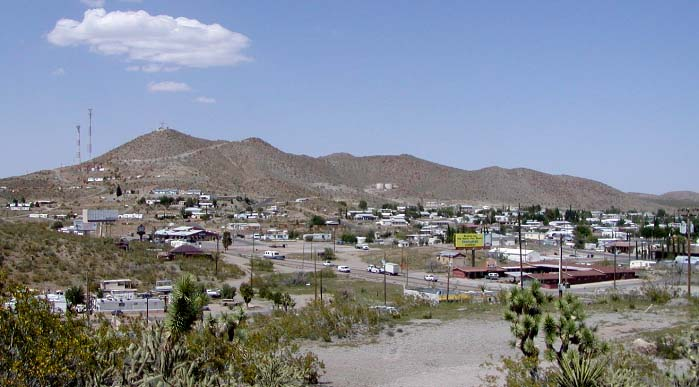
- View of Searchlight, from the southwest

- Location of Searchlight in Clark County, Nevada

- Location within the United States
- Coordinates: 35°27′55″N 114°55′11″W
- Country: United States
- State: Nevada
- County: Clark
- Founded: May 6, 1897; 129 years ago
- Named for: Searchlight

Area
  - Total: 3.87 sq mi (10.03 km^{2})
  - Land: 3.87 sq mi (10.03 km^{2})
  - Water: 0 sq mi (0.00 km^{2})
- Elevation: 3,547 ft (1,081 m)

Population (2020)
  - Total: 445
  - Density: 114.9/sq mi (44.35/km^{2})
- Time zone: UTC-8 (PST)
  - Summer (DST): UTC-7 (PDT)
- ZIP codes: 89039, 89046
- Area codes: 702 and 775
- FIPS code: 32-65600
- GNIS feature ID: 0845654
- Website: Official website

Nevada Historical Marker
- Reference no.: 116

Searchlight is an unincorporated town and census-designated place (CDP) in Clark County, Nevada, United States, at the topographic saddle between two mountain ranges. At the 2020 census, it had a population of 445.

== History ==
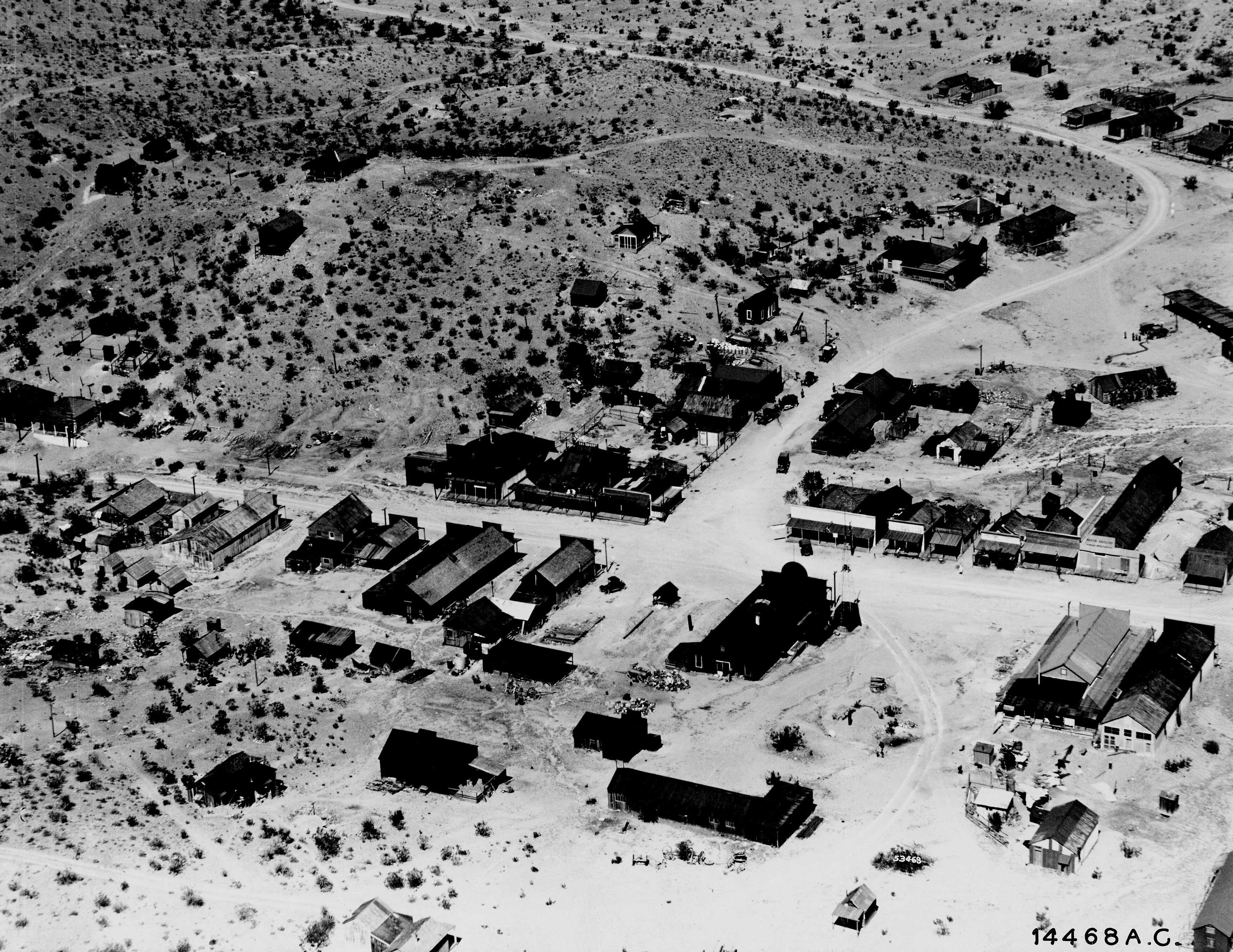
Searchlight in 1923

According to U.S. Senator Harry Reid (1939–2021), who wrote extensively about his hometown, when George Frederick Colton was looking for gold in the area on May 6, 1897. he supposedly said that it would take a searchlight to find gold ore there. Shortly thereafter, he did find gold, leading to a boom era when Searchlight had a larger population than Las Vegas. At the time, it was in Lincoln County, Nevada. As talk surfaced of carving Clark County, out of Lincoln County, Searchlight was initially considered for the county seat. Between 1907 and 1910, the gold mines produced $7 million in gold and other precious minerals, and the town had a population of about 1,500. The ore was shipped to Barnwell, California via the Barnwell and Searchlight Railway.

Other stories on the origin of the name include a story that Colton was lighting a Searchlight brand match when he discovered the gold ore. Reid dismissed this story, saying that the Searchlight matches were not available in 1898. Yet another story says that Colton thought the area would be a good place because it was on a hill. His mine was called the Duplex, because the gold ore was found on two levels.

Searchlight declined after 1917 but remained as a stop on the Arrowhead Highway. In 1927, U.S. Route 91 bypassed the town and its population dropped to 50.

The town had a resurgence in the 1930s and 1940s with the construction of the nearby Hoover Dam and was the site of the El Rey Bordello in the 1940s and early 1950s until the bordello burned down. The last gold mine ceased operating around 1953.

== Geography ==
=== Climate ===
The city experiences a desert climate (Köppen: BWh) with hot summers and cool winters, but it is not uncommon to see temperatures below freezing. Searchlight's elevation makes temperatures somewhat cooler than lower-elevation areas in the Mojave Desert, such as Baker, California; Needles, California; and Fort Mohave, Arizona. However, summers can still be extremely hot. Due to Searchlight's altitude and aridity, temperatures drop quickly after sunset, especially in the summer. Daytime highs in the winter are usually well above freezing, and nighttime lows drop below freezing only a few nights a year.

Climate data for Searchlight, elevation 3,550 ft
Month	Jan	Feb	Mar	Apr	May	Jun	Jul	Aug	Sep	Oct	Nov	Dec	Year
Record high °F (°C)	77 (25)	81 (27)	90 (32)	94 (34)	102 (39)	110 (43)	111 (44)	110 (43)	107 (42)	98 (37)	86 (30)	75 (24)	111 (44)
Mean daily maximum °F (°C)	53.7 (12.1)	58.4 (14.7)	65.0 (18.3)	73.1 (22.8)	82.5 (28.1)	92.7 (33.7)	97.6 (36.4)	95.4 (35.2)	89.0 (31.7)	77.0 (25.0)	63.6 (17.6)	54.4 (12.4)	75.2 (24.0)
Mean daily minimum °F (°C)	35.6 (2.0)	38.3 (3.5)	41.8 (5.4)	48.0 (8.9)	55.9 (13.3)	64.8 (18.2)	71.4 (21.9)	69.6 (20.9)	63.9 (17.7)	53.9 (12.2)	43.0 (6.1)	36.4 (2.4)	51.9 (11.1)
Record low °F (°C)	7 (−14)	11 (−12)	20 (−7)	27 (−3)	30 (−1)	40 (4)	52 (11)	51 (11)	41 (5)	23 (−5)	15 (−9)	8 (−13)	7 (−14)
Average precipitation inches (mm)	0.92 (23)	0.96 (24)	0.77 (20)	0.40 (10)	0.20 (5.1)	0.11 (2.8)	0.91 (23)	1.08 (27)	0.61 (15)	0.52 (13)	0.43 (11)	0.79 (20)	7.70 (196)
Source: WRCC

== Demographics ==
=== 2000 census ===
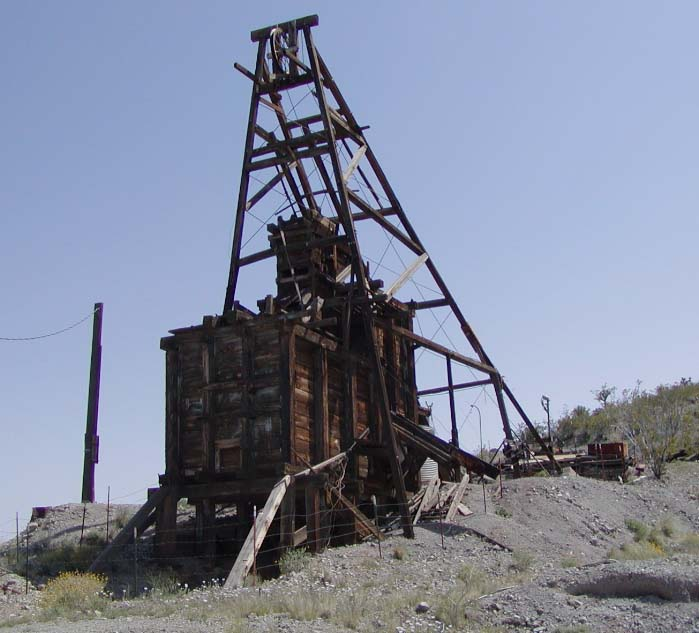
Old mine headframe south of Searchlight

At the 2000 census, there were 576 people, 315 households and 136 families residing in the CDP. The population density was 44.1 per square mile (17.0/km^{2}). There were 444 housing units at an average density of 34.0 per square mile (13.1/km^{2}). The racial make-up of the CDP was 95.0% White, 0.7% African American, 0.7% Native American, 0.2% Asian, 0.2% Pacific Islander, 1.7% from other races and 1.6% from two or more races. Hispanic or Latino of any race were 3.7% of the population.

There were 315 households, of which 8.6% had children under the age of 18 living with them, 34.9% were married couples living together, 5.1% had a female householder with no husband present and 56.8% were non-families. 48.3% of all households were made up of individuals, and 23.5% had someone living alone who was 65 years of age or older. The average household size was 1.76 and the average family size was 2.46.

10.1% of the population were under the age of 18, 3.1% from 18 to 24, 20.0% from 25 to 44, 35.8% from 45 to 64 and 31.1% were 65 years of age or older. The median age was 55 years. For every 100 females, there were 125.9 males. For every 100 females age 18 and over, there were 131.3 males.

The median household income was $24,407 and the median family income was $29,323. Males had a median income of $26,563 and females $27,868. The per capita income was $19,606. None of the household families were living below the poverty line, with just 14.6% of the population comprising that, including no one under age 18 and none of those over 64.

=== 2020 census ===
As of the census of 2020, there were 445 people, 229 households, and 99 families residing in the CDP.

Historical population
Census	Pop.	Note	%±
2000	576		—
2020	445		—
U.S. Decennial Census

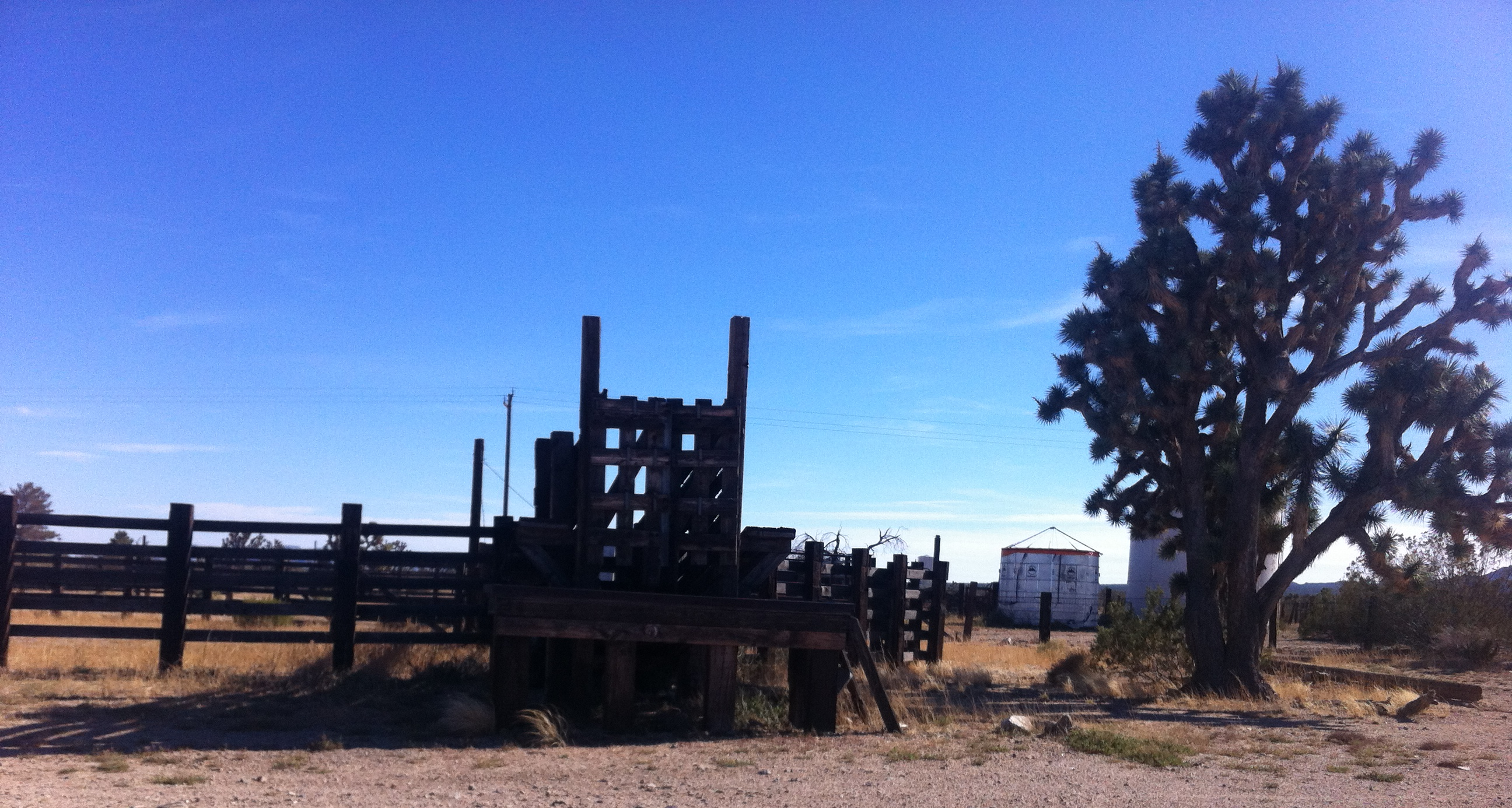
Cattle Loading Gate at Walking Box Ranch near Searchlight

== Education ==
Public education in Searchlight is administered by Clark County School District. The district operates Reid Elementary School (K–5) in Searchlight.

Searchlight has a public library, a branch of the Las Vegas-Clark County Library District.

== Transportation ==
=== Public transport ===
The Silver Rider Transit operates express buses between Laughlin, Searchlight and Las Vegas. Private shuttle companies connect Searchlight with Harry Reid International Airport in Las Vegas.

=== Highways ===
Searchlight is located at the junction of two highways; U.S. Route 95 which connects towards Boulder City and the Las Vegas Valley in the north and Needles, California, in the south, and Nevada State Route 164 which has its eastern terminus in Searchlight and heads west towards the California border from where it becomes Nipton Road and eventually connects to Interstate 15.

== Notable people ==
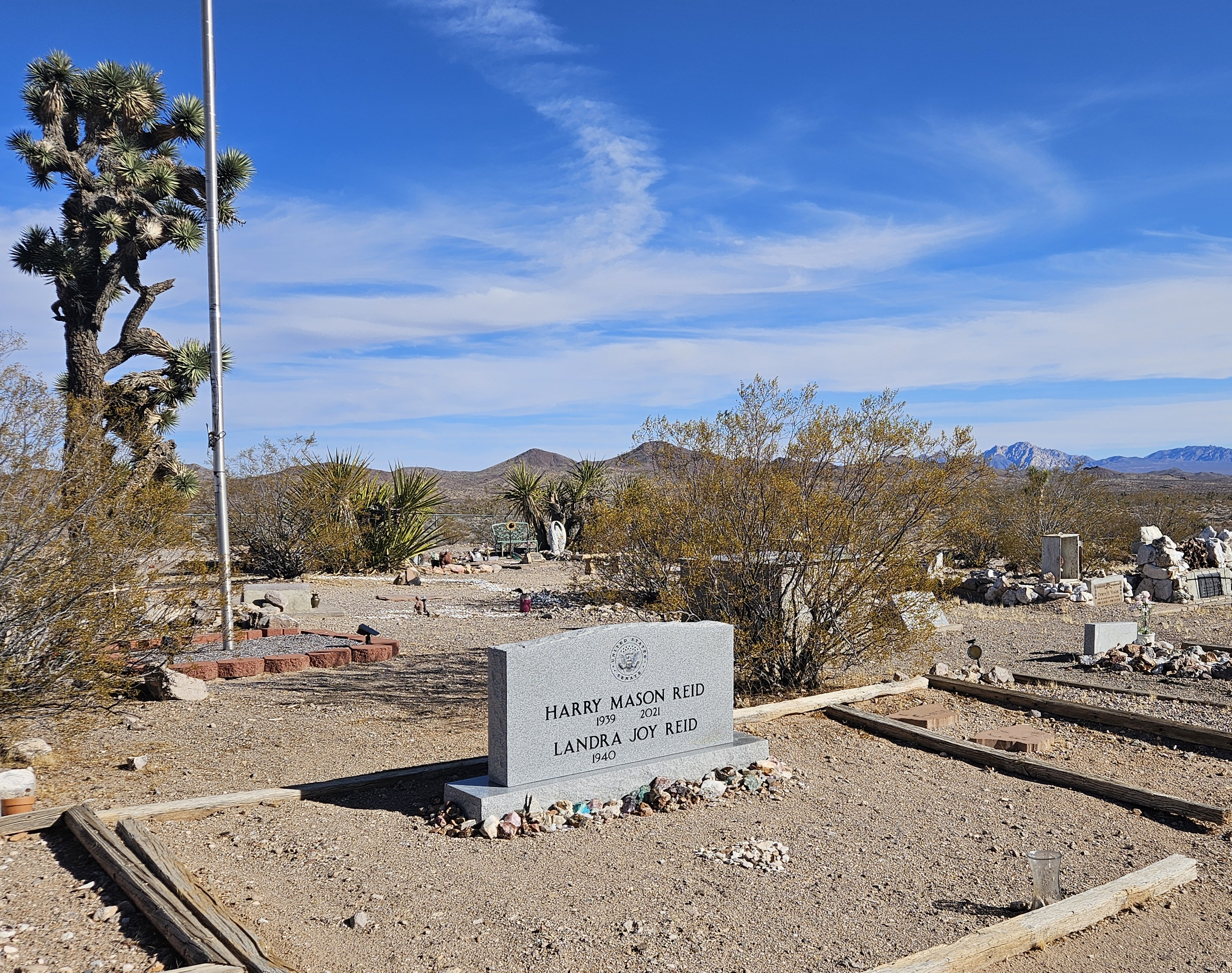
Headstone of U.S. Senator Harry Reid, Searchlight cemetery

- Rex Bell, actor (known for his roles in Westerns) and politician. Owned the Walking Box Ranch with his wife Clara Bow. The ranch was a popular destination for Hollywood actors.
- Edith Head, costume designer who won more Oscars than any other woman.
- William Harrell Nellis, aviator for whom Nellis Air Force Base is named
- Harry Reid, United States senator, 1987–2017, senate majority leader, 2007–2015

== In popular culture ==
In 1907, the "Searchlight Rag" by Scott Joplin was published. In the early 1890s, Joplin's friends, the brothers Tom and Charles Turpin, had been prospecting in the Searchlight area. Their frequent stories of this experience, recounted to the patrons of their bar, inspired the title of the rag.

Searchlight appears as a location in Fallout New Vegas, appearing as an outpost that becomes irradiated following a radiological attack.

== See also ==
- Barnwell and Searchlight Railway
- LORAN-C transmitter Searchlight
- Searchlight Airport
- Avi Kwa Ame National Monument
