= Nevada State Route 164 =

State highway in Nevada, United States

State Route 164
- Nipton Road
- Nevada State Route 164, highlighted in red

Route information
- Maintained by NDOT
- Length: 18.550 mi (29.853 km)
- Existed: July 1, 1976–present
- History: SR 68 by 1940

Major junctions
- West end: Nipton Road at the California state line near Nipton
- East end: US 95 / Cottonwood Cove Road in Searchlight

Location
- Country: United States
- State: Nevada
- County: Clark

Highway system
- Nevada State Highway System; Interstate; US; State; Pre‑1976; Scenic
← SR 163	→ SR 165

State Route 164 (SR 164), also known as Nipton Road or the Joshua Tree Highway, is a state highway in southern Clark County, Nevada. The route, along with the unnumbered Nipton Road located in California, connects U.S. Route 95 (US 95) in Nevada to Interstate 15 in California just south of Primm, via the small town of Nipton, California. The majority of the highway is located within the Avi Kwa Ame National Monument.

== Route description ==
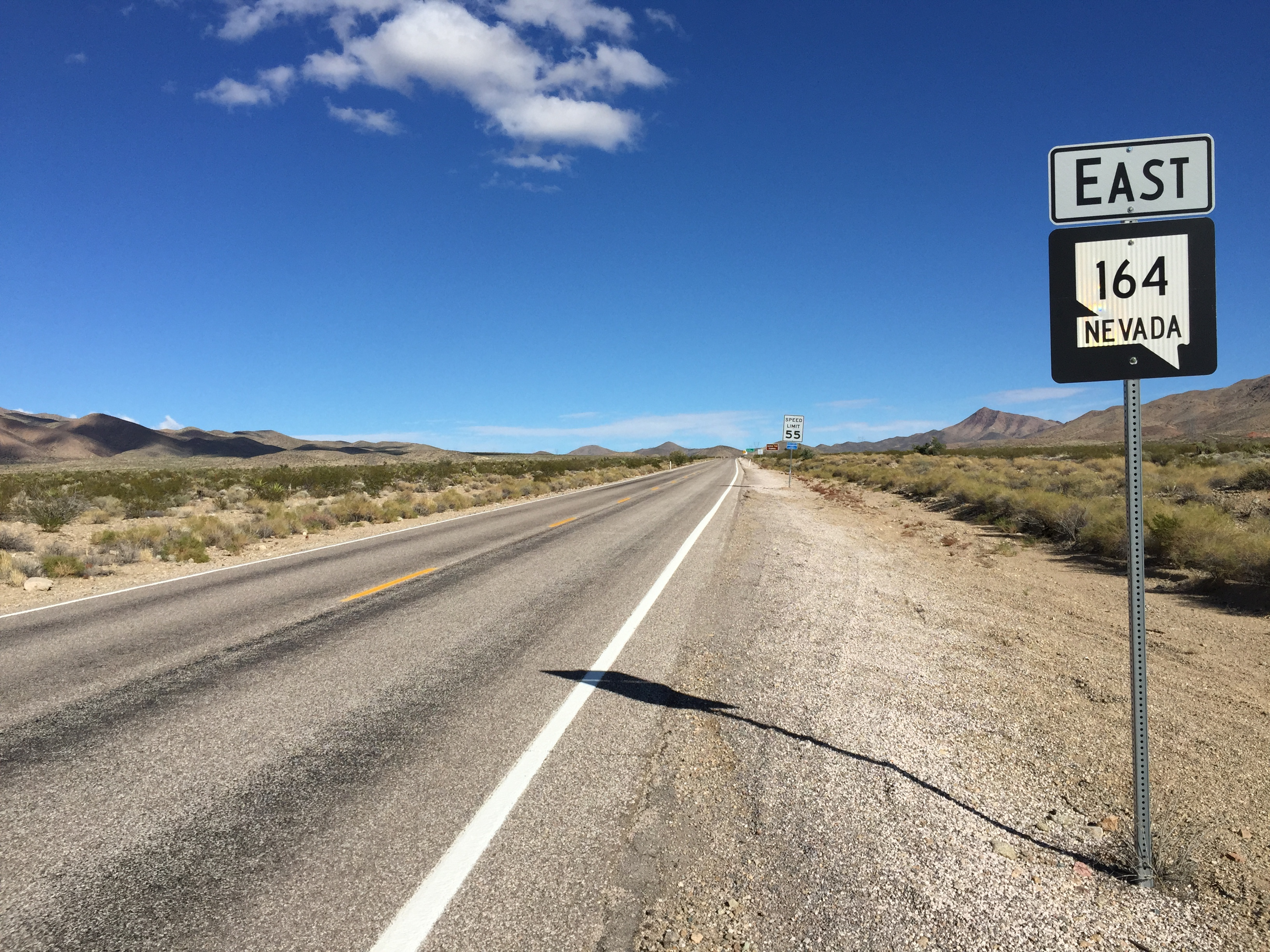
View from the west end of SR 164 looking eastbound in 2015

The route begins at the California-Nevada state line about 3 miles (4.8 km) east of Nipton. The highway treks east from there, curving slightly northeast to pass by the McCullough Range. At the northern tip of the mountains surrounding Crescent Peak, the highway turns slightly more southeast and decreases in elevation as it heads towards Searchlight, Nevada. SR 164 reaches its eastern terminus at the junction with US 95 in the center of Searchlight; however, the roadway continues east as Cottonwood Cove Road, entering the Lake Mead National Recreation Area and ending near Cottonwood Cove.

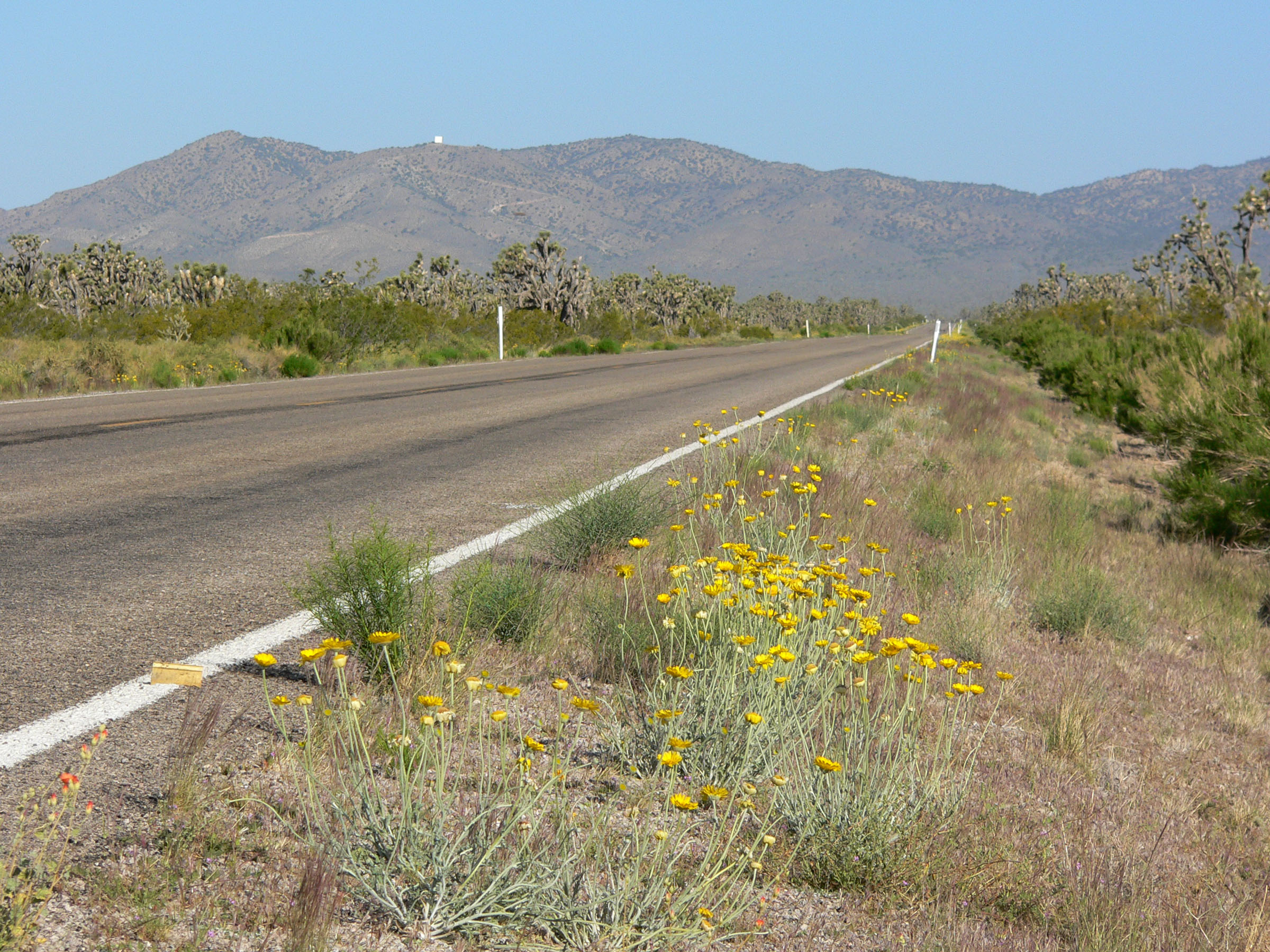
Joshua trees alongside SR 164 eastbound in 2006

In 2003, a sign near Searchlight designated the route as the Joshua Tree Highway, due to the abundance of Joshua trees located along the roadway.

== History ==
The highway connecting Searchlight to Nipton first appears on maps as a county road in 1933. By 1940, the unimproved road was designated State Route 68. The road had been graded by 1950 and was finally paved by 1963.

On July 1, 1976, the Nevada Department of Transportation (NDOT) began a project to renumber the state highway system. During this process, the road was reassigned to State Route 164; this change was first seen on official state highway maps in 1978. The route has been largely unchanged since.

== Major intersections ==
The entire route is in Clark County.

Location	mi	km	Destinations	Notes
	0.000	0.000	Nipton Road west – Nipton	Western terminus; continuation beyond the California state line
Searchlight	18.550	29.853	US 95 – Las Vegas, Laughlin, Needles	Eastern terminus
Searchlight	18.550	29.853	Cottonwood Cove Road – Cottonwood Cove	Continuation beyond eastern terminus
1.000 mi = 1.609 km; 1.000 km = 0.621 mi
