= Ivanpah, California =

Unincorporated community in California, United States

Ivanpah
- Populated place
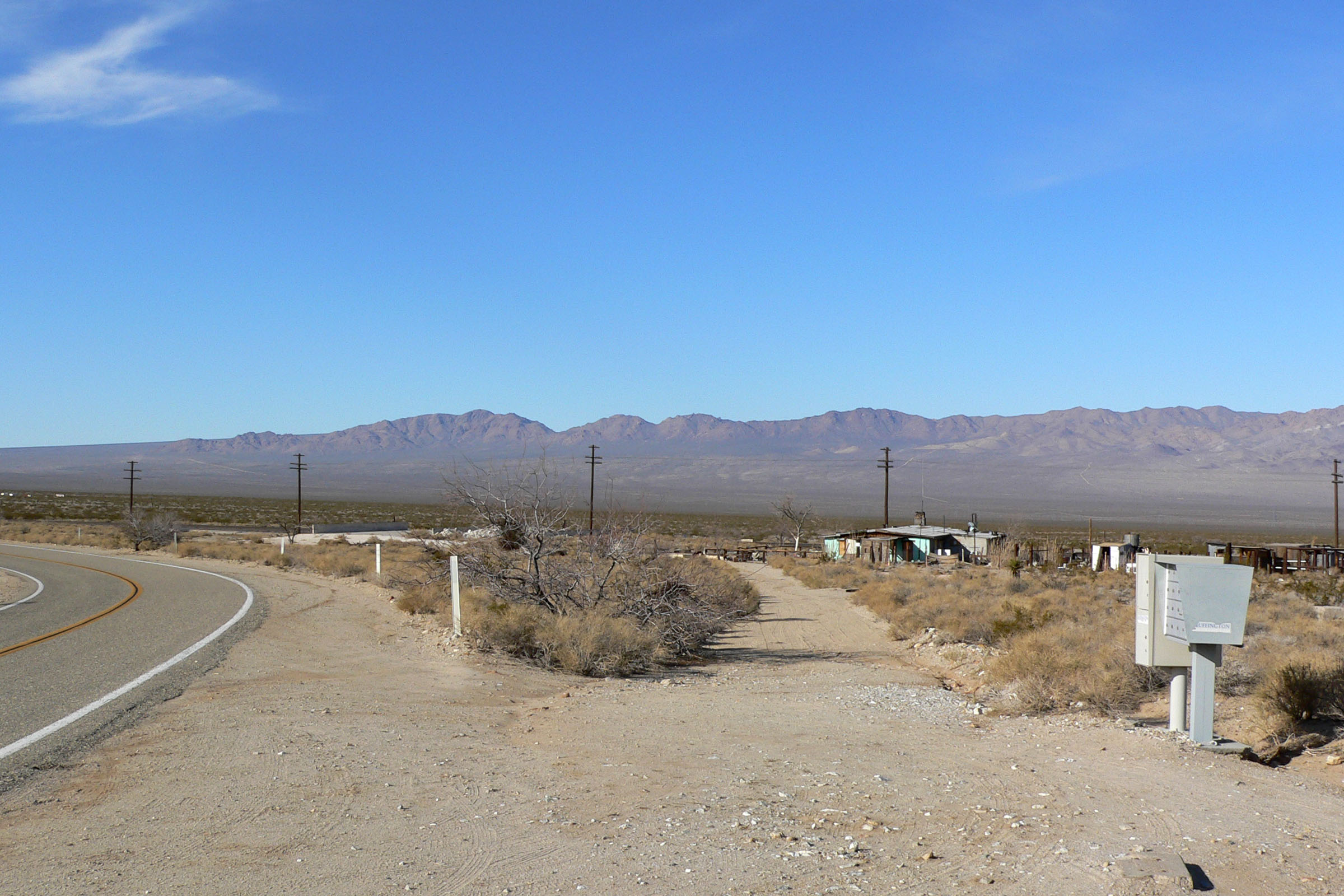
- View of Ivanpah, with the Ivanpah Mountains in the distance

- Location within the state of California Ivanpah (the United States)
- Coordinates: 35°20′26″N 115°18′38″W
- Country: United States
- State: California
- County: San Bernardino
- Elevation: 3,520 ft (1,070 m)
- Time zone: UTC-8 (Pacific (PST))
  - Summer (DST): UTC-7 (PDT)
- GNIS feature ID: 243939

Ivanpah (Chemehuevi: "Clean Water") is in the Mojave National Preserve in San Bernardino County, California. There are several residences in the area, but no real village.

Ivanpah is located on the bajada below the northeast side of the New York Mountains overlooking the broad Ivanpah Valley. The Ivanpah Mountains lie across the valley to the northwest.

Ivanpah is located at the crossing of Ivanpah Road and the Union Pacific Railroad Cima Subdivision, which was the Los Angeles and Salt Lake Railroad until 1921 when it was bought out by Union Pacific. It was also the northern terminus of the California Eastern Railway during its existence. There was once a general store located there.

Ivanpah is also the home of the Ivanpah Solar Power Facility, the largest thermal solar power facility in the world, which opened officially on February 13, 2014.
