= Stateline Wilderness =

Protected wilderness area in California, United States

- IUCN category Ib (wilderness area)
- Location within southern California Location within California Location within the United States
- Location: San Bernardino County, California, United States
- Nearest town: Primm, Nevada
- Coordinates: 35.640°N 115.484°W
- Area: 6,964 acres (28 km^{2})
- Established: 1994
- Governing body: Department of Interior Bureau of Land Management

The Stateline Wilderness is a wilderness area located in San Bernardino County, California, approximately three miles northwest of Primm, Nevada and I-15. Having an area of approximately 7,004 acres (2,834 ha), it contains the eastern terminus of the 15-mile-long (24 km) Clark Mountain Range.

The limestone/dolomite mountains are steep and rugged. Dominant vegetation includes creosote brush and bursage on the bajadas and Mojave yucca, Joshua tree, cacti, and various mixed shrubs on the slopes. The highest elevations contain some pinyon-juniper habitat. There are no known permanent water sources in the wilderness. Wildlife is typical for the Mojave Desert; including coyote, black-tailed jackrabbits, ground squirrels, kangaroo rats, quail, roadrunners, rattlesnakes, and several species of lizards.
