= Goffs, California =

Unincorporated community in California, United States

- Unincorporated community
- Location within the state of California Goffs, California (the United States)
- Coordinates: 34°55′09″N 115°03′46″W
- Country: United States
- State: California
- County: San Bernardino
- Founded: 1893
- Elevation: 2,595 ft (791 m)

Population (January 2009)
  - Total: 23
- Time zone: UTC-8 (Pacific (PST))
  - Summer (DST): UTC-7 (PDT)
- ZIP codes: 92332
- Area codes: 442/760
- FIPS code: 071-30266
- GNIS feature ID: 242776

Goffs, an unincorporated community in San Bernardino County, California, is a nearly empty one-time railroad town at the route's high point in the Mojave Desert. Goffs was a stop on the famous U.S. Route 66 until 1931 when a more direct road opened between Needles and Essex. Goffs was also home to workers of the nearby Santa Fe Railroad, with Homer east, Fenner south, and Blackburn and Purdy north. Goffs is also known as the "Desert Tortoise Capital of the World."

The site that would become Goffs was originally founded as a railroad siding in 1883, as it was at the highest point on the railroad between Barstow and Needles. As helper engines were needed to assist westbound trains up the grade from the Colorado River, the engines would be removed from the main line at this location, placed on a turn-table and headed back to Needles. Initially the settlement of Goffs was known as Blake between 1893 and 1902. It was named for Isaac Blake, the builder of the Nevada Southern Railway (later the California Eastern Railway 1895–1923) that commenced here.

An early 20th Century general store was the town's largest building until it was destroyed by a fire on June 8, 2021. A historic schoolhouse, built in 1914 and almost totally deteriorated by the early 1980s, has since been renovated to its original plans by the Mojave Desert Heritage and Cultural Association (MDHCA). The schoolhouse and grounds now house a museum primarily specializing in the area's mining history.

During World War II, the town was the home of Camp Goffs, a large US army depot and training center.

Goffs is accessible off Interstate 40 at U.S. Highway 95 north. A left turn onto Goffs Road, the pre-1931 alignment of US 66, becomes a desolate forty-mile (64 km) stretch that served as home to several towns that have mostly vanished, including Bannock, Ibis, and the aforementioned Homer. Continuing west on Goffs Road brings motorists back to I-40 at Fenner.

Goffs Road is featured in the opening scene of the 1984 cult classic Repo Man.

Goffs is located at the foothills of the northern terminus of the Piute Mountains; the location is also the southern terminus of the Lanfair Valley, which drains south from the east region of the Mojave National Preserve. The drainage is the Sacramento Wash, which turns due east to meet the Piute Wash, just west of the Colorado River. Goffs is on the foothill bajadas that drain northward into Sacramento Wash.
