= Paper railroad =

Company in the railroad business that exists on paper only

In the United States, a paper railroad is a company in the railroad business that exists "on paper only": as a legal entity which does not own any track, locomotives, or rolling stock.

In the early days of railroad construction, paper railroads had to exist by necessity while in the financing stage. It allowed incorporation of a company and the seeking of capital to build a proposed railroad. In the 1850s, speculation of stock of paper railroads became rampant, causing a bubble of their stocks. This led in large part to the Panic of 1857. Throughout the 19th and early 20th centuries, this specific connotation of the phrase "paper railroad" was consistent: a proposed, often speculative (and sometimes wildly speculative) venture in which a company stock exists, but no physical assets to run a railroad do. In many cases, these railroads still existed as corporate entities long after plans to build them had been scrapped.

In the context of recent times, the phrase "paper railroad" is still used, but generally refers to railroads which are subsidiaries of larger parent railroads, or formerly existed and still have locomotives or rolling stock in the former railroad's livery. Reasons railroads are operated this way include those of internal corporate structure, tax ownership or locale, or for public relations purposes. If not actually operating, these railroads are "non-operating subsidiaries" of the parent railroad.

== See also ==
- Operating subsidiary
- Railway Mania
