= Exeter Branch =

Rail line in California

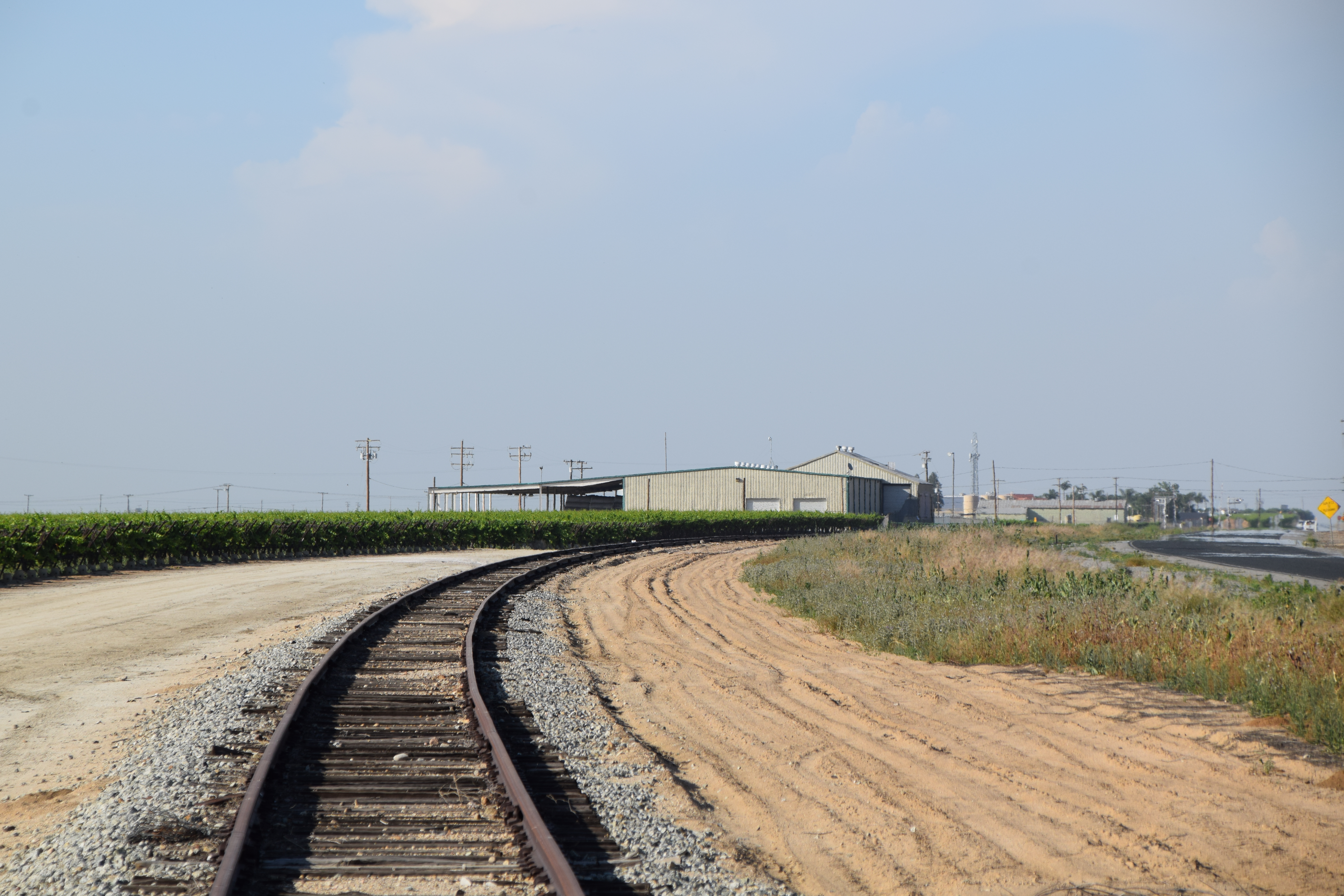

Overview
- Status: In-Service: Fresno–Exeter Intact, abandoned: Exeter–Strathmore Abandoned: Strathmore–Hollis Intact, abandoned: Hollis–Famoso
- Owner: 1888–1991: Southern Pacific Railroad 1991+: San Joaquin Valley Railroad
- Locale: San Joaquin Valley, California
- Termini: Famoso, Calif.; Fresno, Calif.
- Connecting lines: Visalia Branch
- Former connections: Visalia Electric Railroad Porterville-Orosi District

History
- Work began: 1888
- Opened: Dec 24, 1890
- Closed: Strathmore–Richgrove: 2009–2010 Richgrove–Hollis: 1998

Technical
- Track length: 104.3 mi (167.9 km)
- Track gauge: 4 ft 8 1/2 in (1,435 mm) standard gauge
- Signalling: Automatic block signaling (Famoso to Exeter)

The Exeter Branch is a rail line in California's San Joaquin Valley that, at its fullest extent, ran from Famoso, California, to Fresno, California. The line was constructed from 1888 to 1890, initially by the Stockton and Tulare Railroad Company; which was soon consolidated into the Southern Pacific.

== 1888–1991: SP ownership ==
External Image: SP train at Porterville
- – A Southern Pacific train at the depot in Porterville, 2-25-1910.

The rails from Fresno to Porterville were completed on July 1, 1888. A small yard, turntable, and engine servicing facility were constructed in Porterville. The line from Porterville to Famosa (later Famoso) was completed by December 24, 1890, with end-to-end train service beginning soon after.

=== Mileposts ===
Along the line, stations were constructed to handle the shipment of freight and passengers, and surrounding towns (except for Porterville) were laid out. The line, including stations and sidings, was laid out as follows (as of September 15, 1974, with some modern additions):

Mile Post	Name	Notes	Siding Length (ft)
205.5	Fresno	Yard Limits. Connection with Fresno Subdivision.	
207.0	ATSF Crossing	Yard Limits. Crossing with ATSF Valley Division	
213.0	Locans	Wye	
215.9	Clotho		
219.8	Sanger	Yard limits	4360
227.9	LacJac		
228.0	ATSF Crossing	Crossing with ATSF Visalia District	
229.9	Reedley	Yard limits	4110
235.0	Dinuba	Yard limits	2490
243.6	ATSF Crossing	Crossing with ATSF Visalia District	
257.4	Exeter	Yard limits. Wye and connection with Visalia Branch and Visalia Electric Railroad	3570
264.3	Lindsay	Yard Limits	5090
268.6	Strathmore	Yard Limits	1760
274.8	Porterville		1440
275.95	Porterville Jct Olive St Station	Junction with the Porterville Northeastern (SP Springville Branch) and ATSF Porterville-Orosi District	
282.6	Terra Bella		
287.1	Ducor	Yard Limits. Joint ATSF-SP running south to Famoso and then to Bakersfield via Fresno Subdivision	3380
	Vestal		
294.9	Richgrove	Yard Limits. Switch to Richgrove Branch	3330
293.0	Quality		
299.0	Jasmin	Yard Limits	
305.5	Hollis		
307.5	Calico		
309.8	Famoso	Yard Limits. Connection with Fresno Subdivision. Joint ATSF-SP running north to Ducor.	

=== Description of the route ===
The Exeter Branch's southern terminus is at Famoso, where the diverging switch leads the line northeast of the Fresno Subdivision. The Santa Fe had trackage rights on this line from Famoso to Ducor, where their own line split off as the Porterville-Orosi District. (They also had trackage rights from Bakersfield to Famoso via the Fresno Subdivision).

Approximately 2.3 miles from the Famoso switch is Calico, where a red board has been installed as of 2024, embargoing the line further north.

Hollis, the next station on the line, was the location of an agricultural products company; the last rail-served shipper on this segment of line. SJVR successfully abandoned the line between Hollis and Quality in 1998; they retained the short southern section of the line specifically to serve this shipper. As of 2025, the tracks physically end here.

At Richgrove, a short branch line led west to Jovistsa and a large packing house complex and winery. This branch was in service as late as 2008, but was abandoned and removed by 2010, as was the main line section between Richgrove and Strathmore.

Past Richgrove, the line served an electrical substation and packing house at Vestal. The rails cross over CA-65 on a bridge before entering the town of Ducor. This is where the ATSF Porterville-Orosi District split off from the SP to run northeast to Ultra.

The Exeter Branch continued due north from Ducor to Tera Bella.

The line continued in a northeasterly direction to the city of Porterville, where it again turned north. The rails crossed the Tule River on a combination steel and wooden bridge. The passenger depot is located at 257 N D st. The building still stands and is in use today as a historical museum. Porterville was also the location of a wye, which connected with the Springville branch (former Porterville Northeastern). This branch ran east and the northeast to Springville, and was abandoned in sections between 1935 and 1996. Continuing north, the line gradually curved northwest as it ran parallelly to Main St / Orange Belt Dr.

The next town on the line was Strathmore, a connecting point with a former Visalia Electric Railroad line to Exeter.

North of Strathmore is the town of Lindsay.

The line continues northwest to Exeter. This is the location of the current SJVR shops, as well as a connecting track to a potion of the former Visalia Electric Railroad and Porterville-Orosi District. Another branch here leads also west to Visalia, Goshen, and the Fresno Subdivision.

After passing through Ivanhoe and Monson, the tracks reach Dinuba, then Reedley. The SP bridge over the Kings River in Reedley burned down in 1973, so SP relocated their tracks to use the ATSF Visalia District bridge. After crossing the river, the SP line crossed over the ATSF line at a diamond near Lacjac.

Continuing northwest, the line parallels Newmark Ave before crossing it and an irrigation canal at a shallow angle. The tracks enter the city of Sanger, before curving to run west for the remainder of the trip to Fresno.

In Fresno, the rails run just to the north of California Ave. There are also connections the BNSF line. After crossing the Bakersfield Subdivision at a diamond, the Exeter Branch rejoins the Fresno Subdivision.

== 1991–present: SJVR ownership, abandonments, and future commuter rail operations ==
On Dec 31, 1991, the San Joaquin Valley Railroad began operations over the Exeter Branch. The Southern Pacific retained ownership of the line and has contracted with SJVR to operate them until abandonment or expiration of the lease.

In 1998, the SJVR filed to abandon 9 miles of track from MP 295.2 near Richgrove to MP 304.2 (Quality to Hollis), which was subsequently approved, and the tracks were pulled up.

On February 19, 2008, SJVR filed with the STB a petition to abandon a 30.57-mile portion of the South Exeter Branch between milepost 268.60 at Strathmore, CA, and milepost 299.17 at Jovista, CA, in Tulare County, CA. The line traverses United States Postal Service Zip Codes 93218, 93221, 93247, 93257, 93258, 93261, 93267, and 93270, and includes the stations of Strathmore (milepost 268.60), Porterville (milepost 274.80), Elmco (milepost 280.10), Ultra (milepost 282.00), Terra Bella (milepost 282.60), Ducor (milepost 287.10), Richgrove (milepost 294.90), and Jovista (milepost 299.17). As of that date, only one shipper remained on this section of line, and a $950-per-car surcharge was in effect for this shipper and any additional shippers. SJVR was hoping to save $119,765 in annual operating costs.

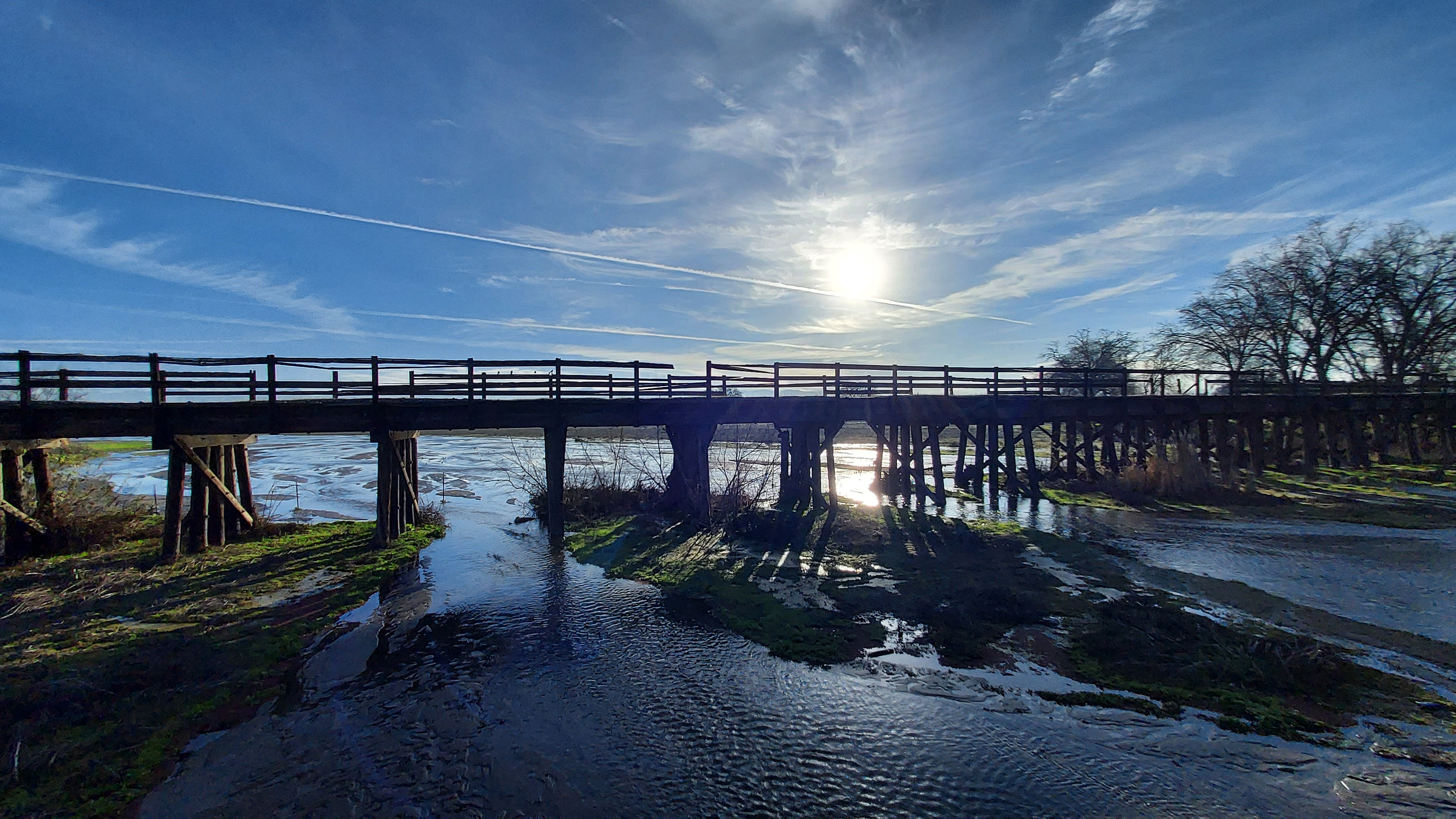
The abandoned rail bridge just north of Terra Bella

The county of Tulare sought to purchase this section of rail line in order to preserve it for future use, and placed a bid of $500,000 to purchase it. This bid was rejected by the SJVR, who accepted a $1m bid from Tulare Valley Railroad. The approval to abandon was granted by Federal Transportation regulators on 6/6/2008, and all of the track from Richgrove (including the Richgrove Branch) to Strathmore was abandoned and pulled up. On October 18, 2012, the trestle in Porterville over the Tule River caught fire and burned. Union Pacific sent a crew in December 2012 with the intent to remove the trestle. Only the concrete supports remain in place. On September 2, 2014, as part of a Measure R supplemental agreement, Porterville purchased a segment of the abandoned Exeter Branch right-of-way, extending south from Frazier Highway to Teapot Dome Ave, together with all culverts, ballast, bridges and appurtenances- a distance of approximately 8.2 miles. The right-of-way was acquired to meet the future transportation needs of the city.

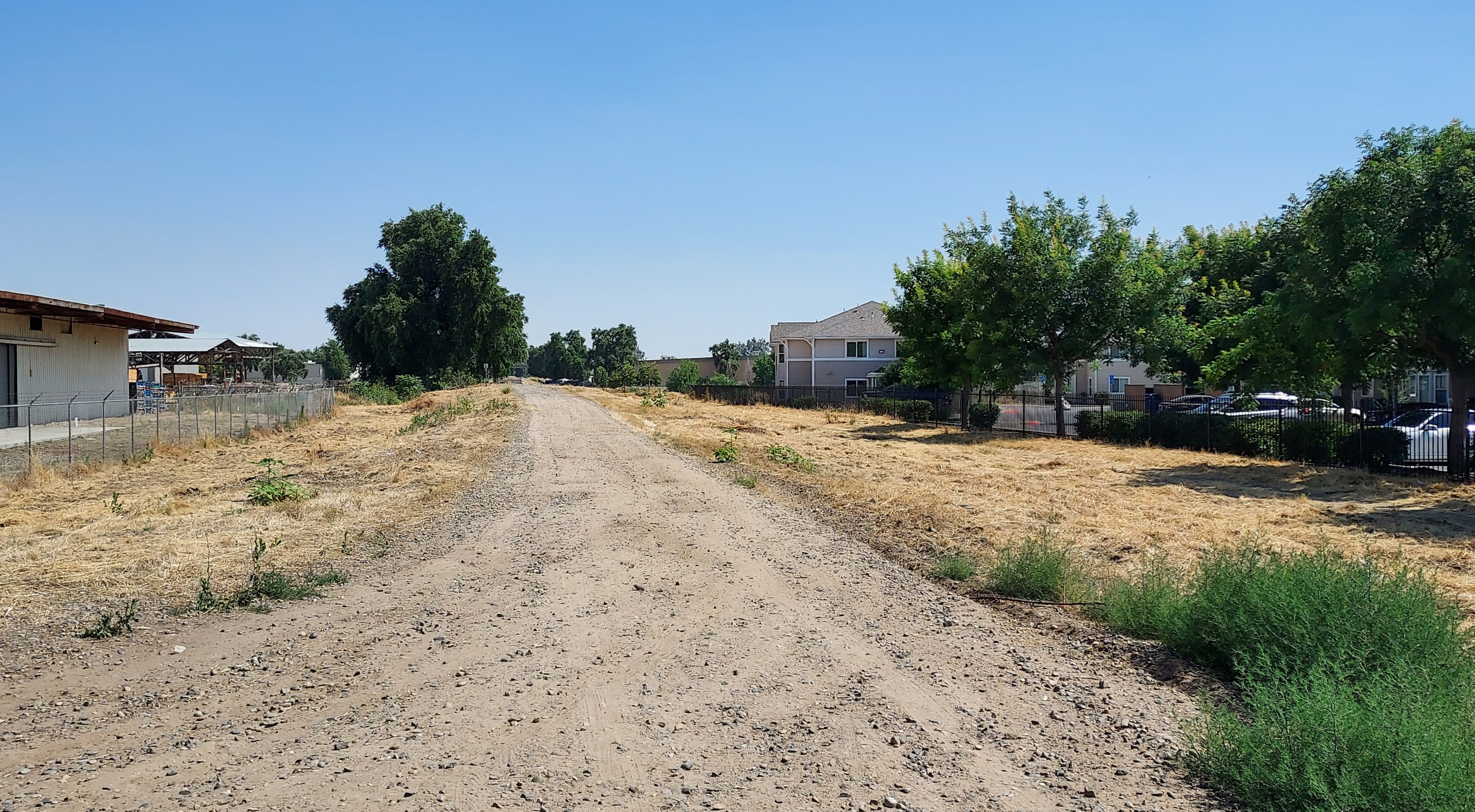
A section of the abandoned right-of-way in Porterville, 2024.

On February 28, 2008, SJVR filed with the STB a petition to abandon a 9.20-mile portion of its South Exeter Branch extending between milepost 259.40, near Exeter, and milepost 268.60, near Strathmore, in Tulare County, CA. The line traverses United States Postal Service Zip Codes 93221, 93247, and 93267, and includes the stations of Strathmore and Lindsay. This approval was not granted, so the current end-of-track is at milepost 267.4, between Lindsay and Strathmore.

On April 4, 2024, SJVR filed with the STB a petition to discontinue service over an approximately 4.3-mile rail line between milepost 304.2 and milepost 308.5 in Kern County, Cal. (Famoso to Hollis). As of December 2024, a red board had been erected just north of Whisler Rd, leaving approximately 2.24 miles of track still in service between the Famoso switch and Whisler Rd. The remaining northern 2.40 miles of track is now out of service.

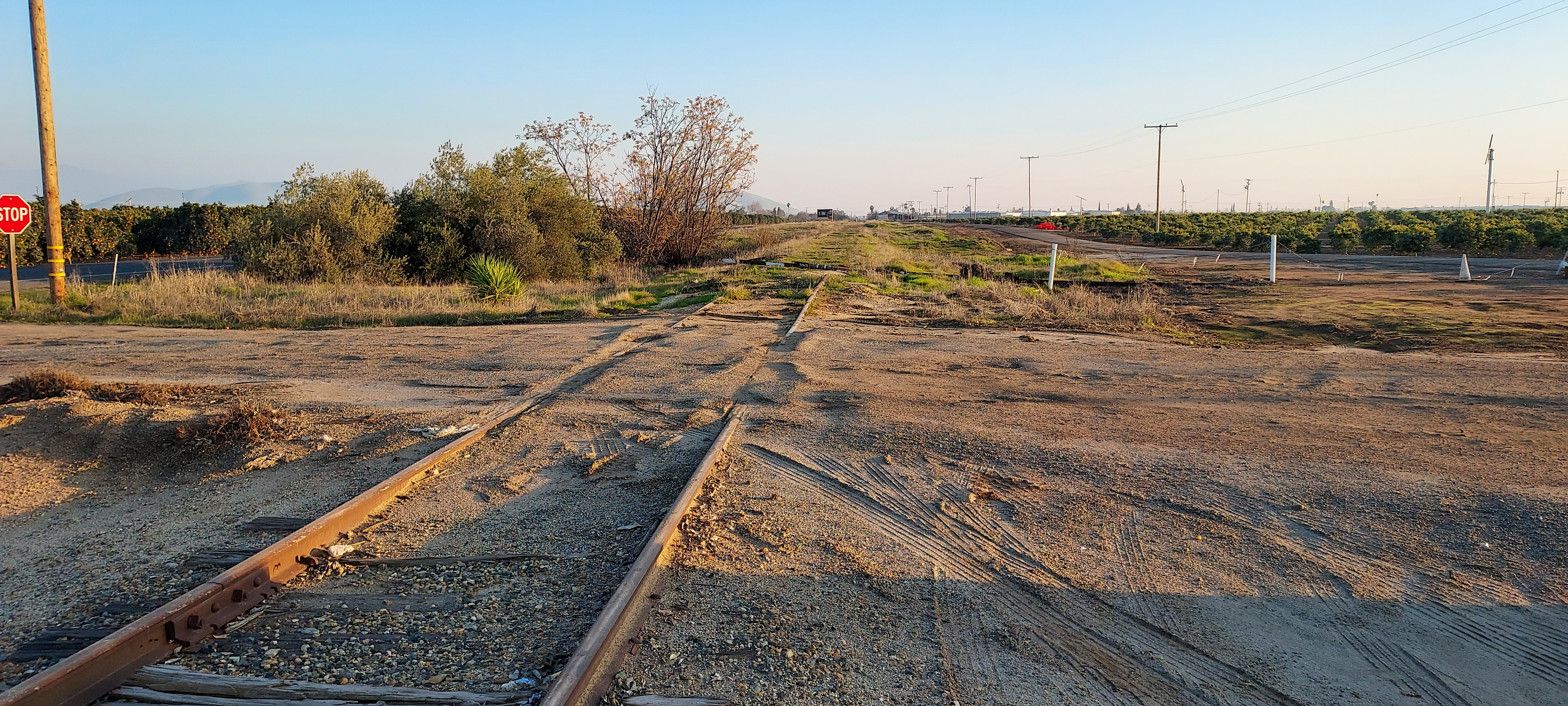
Abandonment between Lindsay and Strathmore

=== Current SJVR operations ===
External image
- – An SJVR train at Ivory Choice Terminal Co (ICTC).

Presently, the Exeter Branch, called the Exeter Sub by SJVR, sees service several times a week. Ivory Choice Terminal Co., near Reedley, is a road-rail transload facility on 91 acres of land, that can handle various types of cargo. The facility can handle more than 200 railcars at once and has a team of 19 workers. Superior Soil at Ivanhoe supplies landscape materials and uses open-top gondolas. Exeter Yard is still in use as a switching facility and transfer point, and the SJVR locomotive shops are also here.

=== Cross Valley Corridor ===
The Cross Valley Corridor is a proposed passenger rail service in Fresno, Kings, and Tulare counties, utilizing the existing rail corridor (including part of the Exeter Branch), and providing access to the planned California High-Speed Rail system. The proposed service would run from Huron to Porterville, using a Diesel multiple unit as the equipment.

The first two phases of the plan, from 2018 to 2038, involve expanding bus services and starting rail service from Lemoore to Visalia. Phase 3, from 2038+, will involve opening new rail stations in Exeter, Lindsay, and Porterville. The rail infrastructure from Exeter to Lindsay is still in place. From Lindsay to Porterville, the rails would need to be replaced, but Porterville did acquire 8.2 miles of the right-of-way from UP.

=== Fresno Regional Rail ===
The Fresno Council of Governments, in partnership with the Fresno County Rural Transit Agency, is pursuing a Caltrans Sustainable Communities Planning Grant to develop the Fresno County Regional Rail Feasibility Study. The proposed route, running from Firebaugh to Dinuba, includes a portion of the Exeter Branch from Fresno to Dinuba, including Sanger and Reedley.

== See also ==
- Southern Pacific Railroad
- San Joaquin Valley
- Other lines operated by the San Joaquin Valley Railroad
  - Riverdale Branch
  - Sunset Railway
- List of California railroads
