= Visalia District =

Former Santa Fe railway line in San Joaquin Valley, CA, U.S.

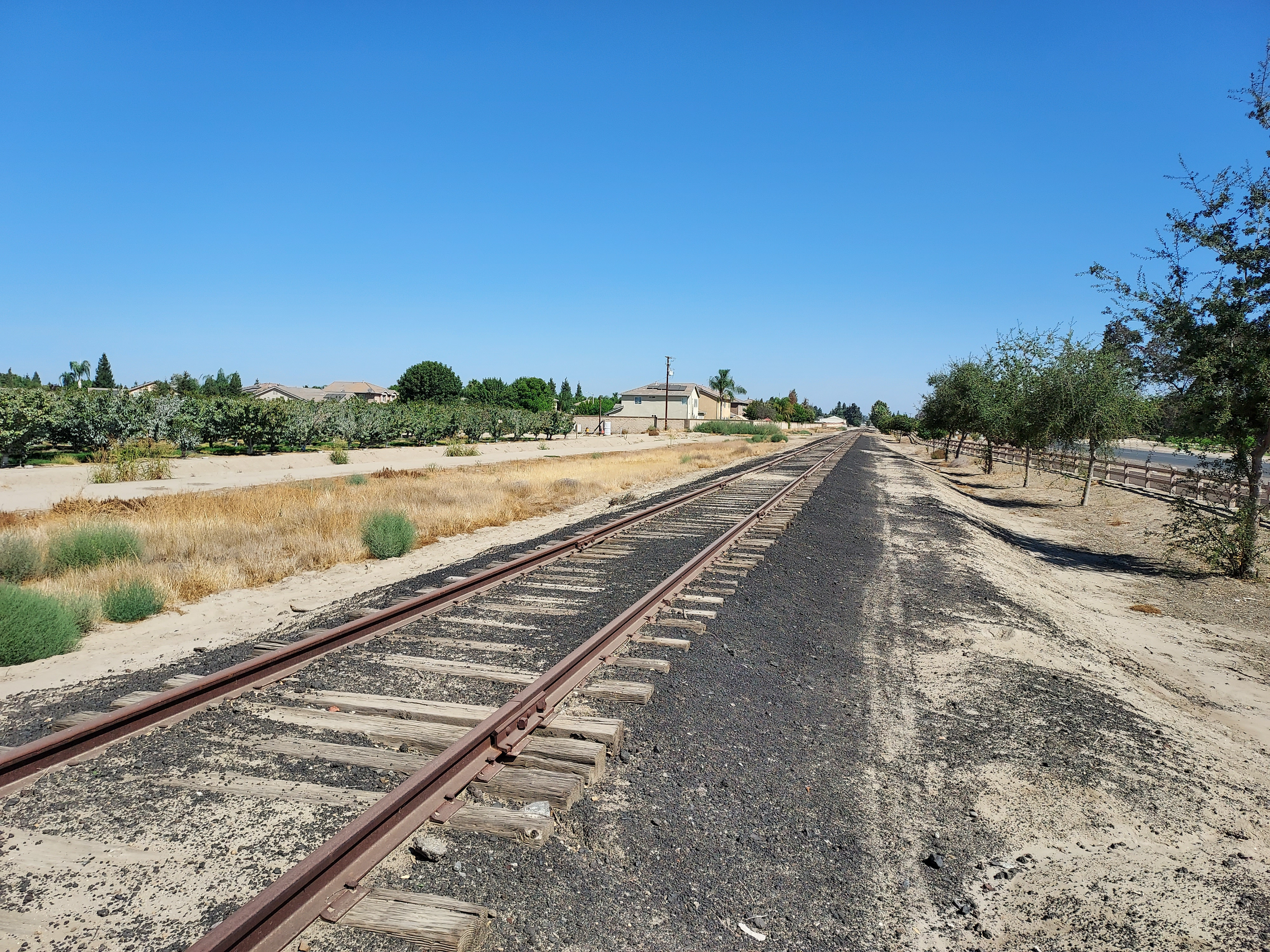
- The Visalia District looking north at Higby, between Tulare and Visalia, in 2021.

Overview
- Status: Abandoned, except for two short segments
- Owner: 1897-1898: San Francisco and San Joaquin Valley Railroad 1898-1992: Atchison, Topeka and Santa Fe Railway 1992-1998: Tulare Valley Railroad 1998+: San Joaquin Valley Railroad
- Locale: Kings County, California Tulare County, California Fresno County, California
- Termini: Calwa, CA; Corcoran, CA
- Connecting lines: Wahtoke District, Porterville-Orosi District

Service
- Type: Freight Rail, Passenger Rail

History
- Work began: 1897
- Completed: 1898
- Closed: 1994-1998

Technical
- Track length: 68.90 mi (110.88 km)
- Track gauge: 4 ft 8 1/2 in (1,435 mm) standard gauge
- Operating speed: 40 mph (64 km/h)
- Signalling: None

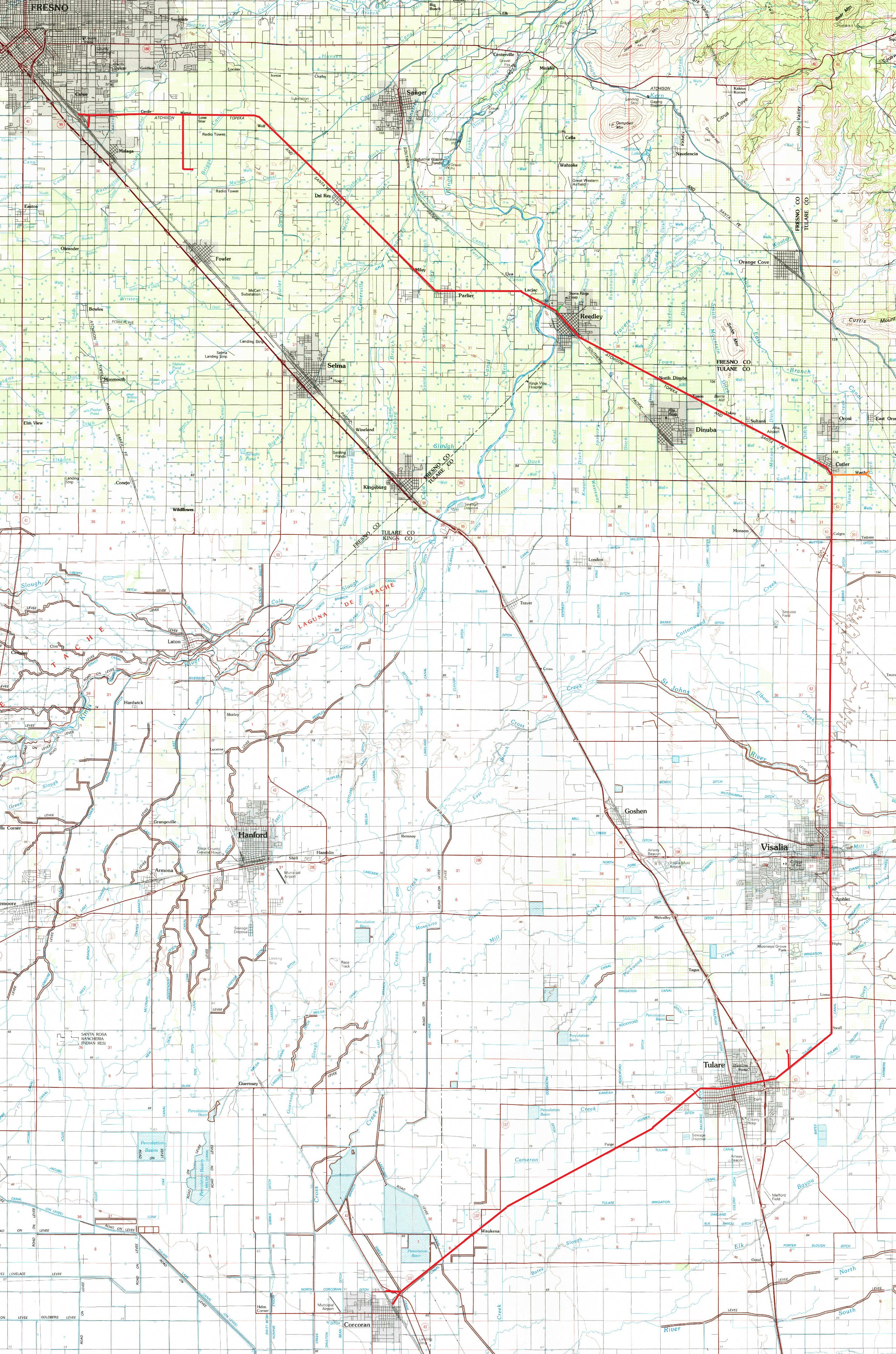
Tulare and Fresno counties with Visalia District in red. Data available from U.S. Geological Survey, National Geospatial Program.

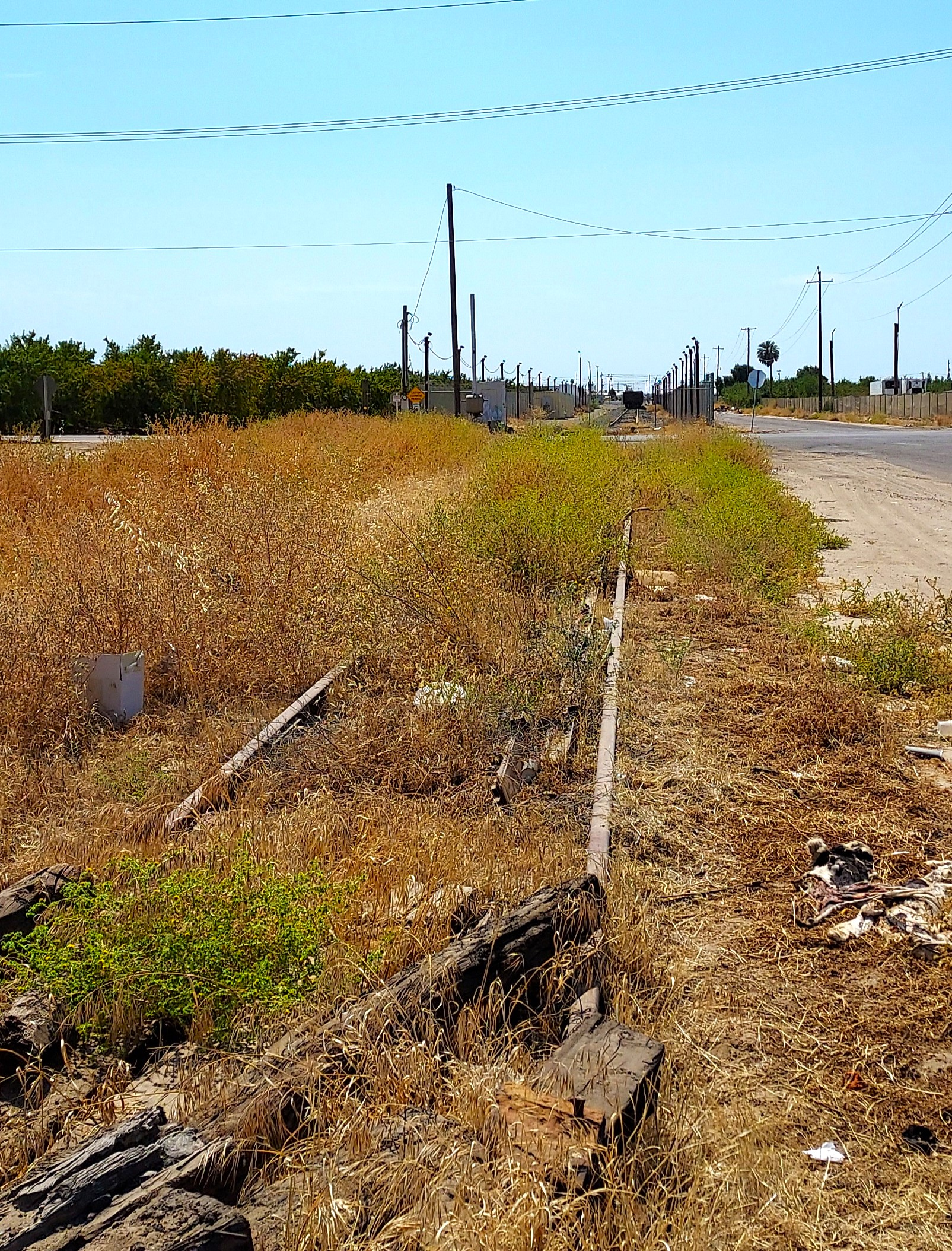
Railroad detritus present on a section of rail just past the abandonment in Calwa- active track visible in background Derelict cantilever signal in Dinuba

The Visalia District (later Visalia Subdivision) was a railway line in California's San Joaquin Valley that ran from Corcoran, California to Calwa, California. The line was originally built by the San Francisco and San Joaquin Valley Railroad and later acquired by the Atchison, Topeka and Santa Fe Railway.

== 1897-1992: SF&SJV / ATSF ownership ==
Construction began in 1897, with rails laid from Calwa to Visalia. Passenger service began on September 10, 1897. Subsequently, the line was extended from Visalia to Corcoran via Tulare, in 1898. Depots were established along the line every few miles. The route of the line including locations of significance was as follows:

Mile Post	Name	Notes
0.00	Corcoran*	Originally called Jacobs Well
0.30	Corcoran Junction	Wye and connection with the Atchison, Topeka and Santa Fe Railway Valley Division. Yard Limits.
4.40	Waukena*	Depot
10.00	Paige*	
11.60	Robla*	
14.80	Tulare Tower	Interlocking crossing with Southern Pacific Bakersfield Subdivision
15.00	Tulare*	Depot and small 4-track yard. Yard Limits.
19.10	Swall	
20.20	Loma	Location of agricultural products shipper; last remaining customer on line.
22.10	Higby	1000 ft spur, east connection (1984 timetable)
23.40-23.80	Ambler	SP/Santa Fe connecting track. Now called "Billy Goat Jct". Reconstructed by SJVR in 1992 to serve shipper at Loma. Was also used to service truck body manufacturer in Tulare until early 1994. Out of service as of 2021.
25.20	Visalia*	Depot. Siding length listed in 1984 timetable at 2338 ft. Yard Limits.
25.30	SP/VE crossing	In-street interlocking crossing with Visalia Electric Railroad
31.80	Burns / Pearl*	
33.30	SP crossing	Interlocking crossing with Southern Pacific Exeter Branch
36.20	Calgro*	Named for California Growers, who had a large winery on site. Originally named Lovell, then Yettem.
38.50	Cutler*	Depot and yard. Connection with the Santa Fe Porterville-Orosi District. Siding length listed in 1984 timetable at 3380 ft. Yard Limits.
41.70	Sultana*	Depot. Originally named Alta.
42.30	Tokay	
43.90	Enson	270 ft spur, east connection (1984 timetable)
45.00	Dinuba	Depot
46.00	Grapegrowers	
46.70	Gilbert	
48.90	Reedley*	Depot. Wye and connection with the Santa Fe Wahtoke District. Yard Limits. Bridge over Kings River is still in service.
49.10	Ito Spur	
50.30	SP crossing	Interlocking crossing with Southern Pacific Exeter Branch
51.00	LacJac*	As of 2023, exists as a spur still in use by SJVR to serve lineside industry
53.40	Parlier*	Depot, Siding length listed in 1984 timetable at 2651 ft.
54.80	Miley*	
55.70	Winery Spur	
58.50	Del Rey*	Depot and small yard
61.90	DeWolf*	Originally named Casty, then Wolf
64.40	Lone Star*	Depot- last remaining intact depot on the line. Siding length listed in 1984 timetable at 1626 ft.
65.20	Mattei Spur	2.2 mile spur to Mattei Winery, west connection (1984 timetable)
65.60	Homsy	
65.70	Janigian	
66.40	Cecile*	
68.90	Calwa*	Wye and connection with the Atchison, Topeka and Santa Fe Railway Valley Division. Yard Limits.
	*	= original SF&SJV station

=== Description of the route ===
Beginning in Calwa, a wye leads the Visalia District tracks east from the mainline and runs alongside Annadale road for some distance. The line crosses Chestnut Ave and still serves several lineside industries here. The beginning of the abandonment is about 1.20 miles east of the throat of the wye at Calwa. At MP 65.20, a spur led south to the Mattei Winery. Lone Star was the next stop, with a depot and packing house served by the railroad. The line then curved southeast at DeWolf, served a packing house, and entered the town of Del Rey.

The railroad served several large citrus packing houses in Del Rey. Still running southeast, the line passed adjacent to a small airstrip and then the Parlier Cemetery as it again curved east into Parlier. After crossing the Santa Fe Canal, the line ran alongside East Parlier Ave for a short distance, then between 1st and Fresno streets. The Nicholas G Verry Inc winery had a rail connection here, and spurs led to various industries in town.

Leaving Parlier, the line ran east along Parlier Ave where it served another packing shed on the south side. Reaching LacJac, the line again curved southeast as it served an adjacent beverage facility. The line then crossed the Southern Pacific's Exeter Branch just before crossing the Kings River on a large steel bridge, entering the town of Reedley. A wye with the Wahtoke District was located here. In Reedley, the ATSF ran parallel to the SP for some distance. Several large packing houses were served on the southeast side of Reedley.

Leaving Reedley, the line continued to serve packing houses as it skirted the north end of Dinuba and crossed Road 80 / Alta Ave. Entering Sultana, the line crossed CA J40 / Ave 416 at a steep angle as it served several large packing houses. Continuing southeast towards Cutler, more packing houses were served on the northwest side of town, as well as several in the town itself. Running parallel to Railroad Ave in Cutler, a small yard and depot were located here. As the line curved due south to cross over CA-63, a diverging switch led east to a connection with the Porterville-Orosi District at Wyeth.

The rail line ran alongside the east side of CA-63 for several miles until it reached the large facility at Calgro, where the highway diverged southwest. Crossing the Southern Pacific's Exeter Branch at mile post 33.30, the line continued due south into Visalia, crossing the St John's River on a large steel bridge.

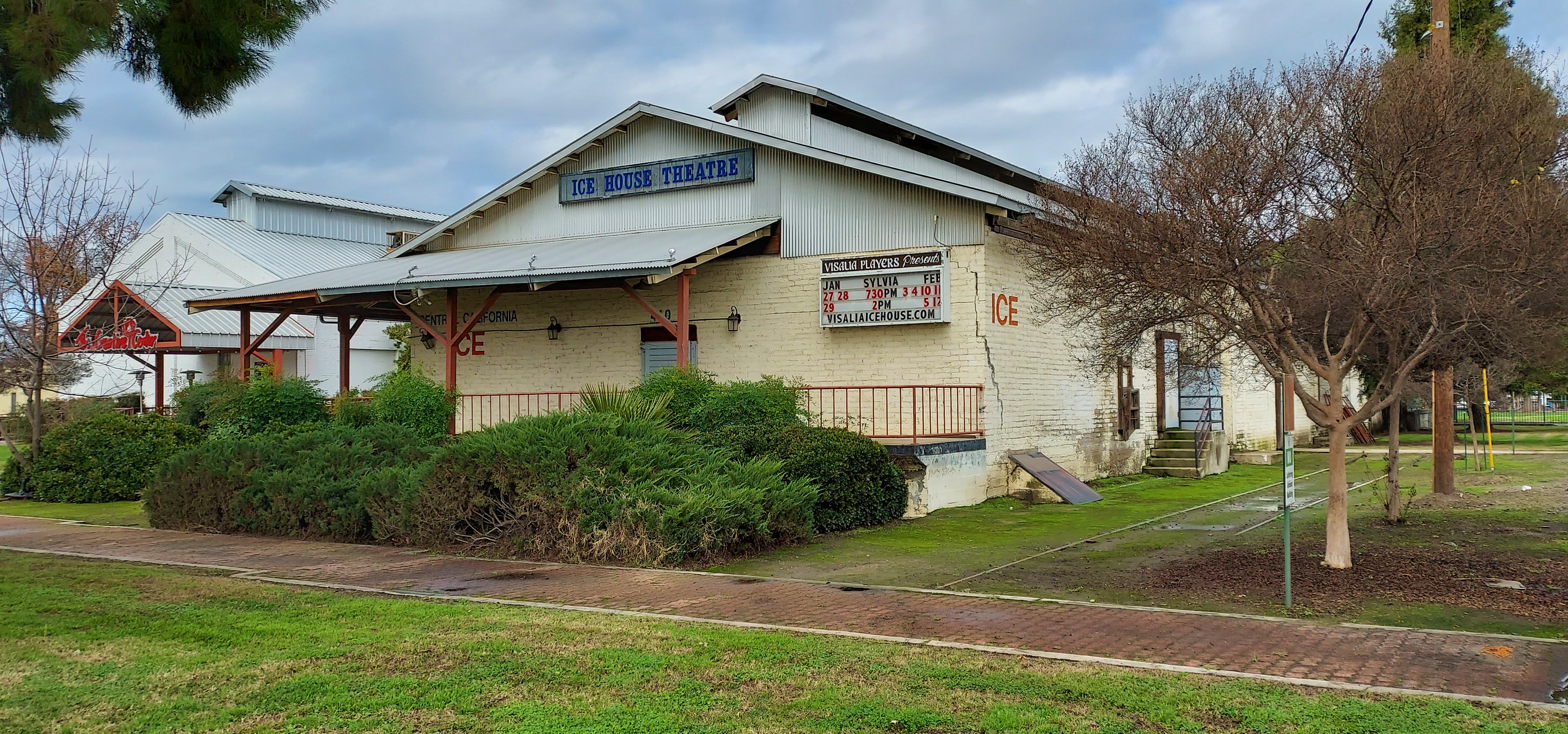
The formerly rail-served ice house in Visalia as it appeared in 2022

Entering Visalia, a small yard was present along with several spurs serving an ice house and other lineside industries. Continuing south down Santa Fe street, the rails were embedded in the asphalt, a practice known as Street running. Just south of the yard, the tracks crossed the Southern Pacific / Visalia Electric line to Exeter (also street running), and the depot was located just south of this diamond.

Still running due south, the line ended street running and ran just to the west of Santa Fe Ave as it left the Visalia city limits. Ambler was the next location of significance; an interchange track between the ATSF and the SP/VE. Additional shippers were served by the Santa Fe at Higby and Loma. Just south of Loma, the rails curved southwest towards the city of Tulare. Just after crossing CA-63 / Mooney Blvd, a spur ran north to serve a lumber mill and large winery. The line continued through Tulare, with a depot present near the downtown area. A truck body manufacturer was also served here. Shortly, the line crossed the Southern Pacific's Bakersfield Subdivision, with an interlocking tower present.

External image
- DRGW 3102 in Tulare – A southbound SP piggyback train crosses the Tulare Diamond with the Visalia District in the foreground

Still running southwest, the line continued to the small town of Waukena, before reaching Corcoran and the wye there.

==== Passenger Service ====
At the peak of passenger service around 1915, as many as 10 trains ran daily. In later years, service was provided by a doodlebug, sometimes pulling a trailer coach. Passenger service was eventually discontinued in 1949.

=== Later years ===
The line remained a valuable source of freight revenue for the Santa Fe through the 1970s, with produce being the predominant commodity. Many of the depots along the line were closed in the 1970s, but several remained open as of 1978, such as the depot in Cutler. Cutler was an important junction point on the line, with various lines extending north, south, and southwest. The other active depot on the line in 1978 was at Reedley. The Reedley depot was closed by 1979 and the one at Cutler was closed and demolished a few years later.

=== 5-12-1992 Operation Lifesaver Special ===
On May 12, 1992, the Santa Fe ran an Operation Lifesaver special from Calwa to Porterville and return, including a portion of the Visalia District. The train ran from Calwa to Cutler and then Visalia, where the motive power ran around the train for the return to Cutler. SJVR GP9 1754, running on the former SP Visalia Branch, met the train in Visalia. Here, the power ran around again for the trip to Porterville, where it was turned on the wye for the return trip to Calwa. EMD GP60M units 116 and 130 led the train, which was made up of a flat car carrying OLS signage and ATSF caboose # 999805.

External image
- ATSF 116 in Visalia – The Operation Lifesaver Special in Visalia on May 12, 1992.

== 1992+: TVRR / SJVR ownership ==
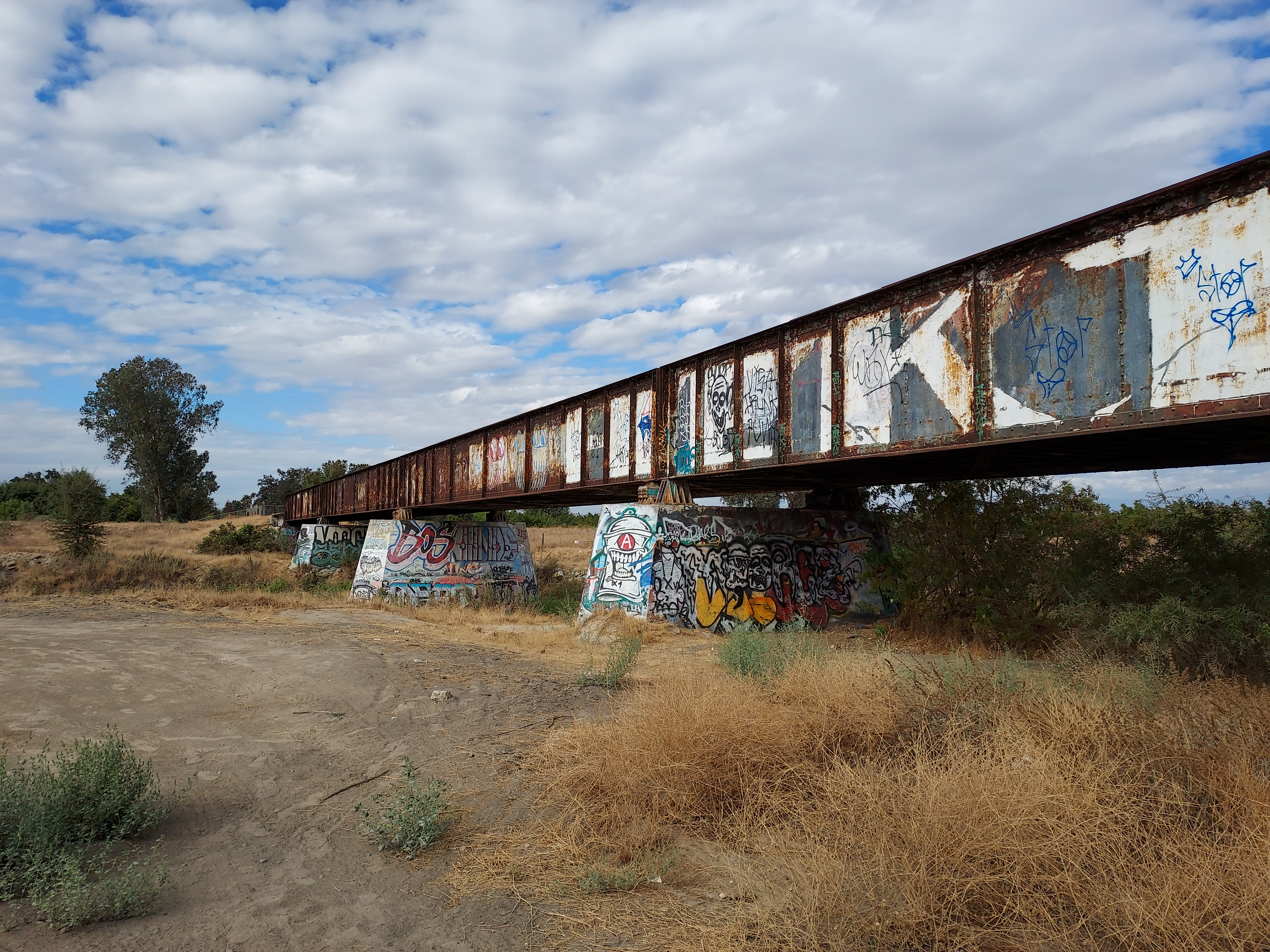
Abandoned bridge just north of Visalia over the St Johns River

On Dec 22, 1992, the line was sold to the Tulare Valley Railroad. The TVRR purchased the rail, ties, ballast, and land. The segment of the Visalia District between Corcoran and Tulare was not used by the TVRR, and was removed by 1994- along with the SP crossing in Tulare. In addition, the segment between Visalia and Cutler was not used by the TVRR and was removed by December 1994, except for the SP connector track at the Early California Foods plant in south Visalia — approximately from mileposts 23.70 to 24.00.

A truck body manufacturer in Tulare was served by the TVRR until early 1994, when a vehicle transloading facility was built in Exeter. The segment from Loma to Tulare was subsequently abandoned and removed in late 1994.

In 1995 the TVRR filed with the ICC to abandon the remaining portions of the line from Cutler to Calwa. By 1997, scrapping and removal had begun. By 1998 the rails were gone.

The TVRR itself became part of the San Joaquin Valley Railroad in 1998, including the small remaining sections of the Visalia District.

== The line since abandonment ==
=== Corcoran to Tulare ===
A short (approximately 0.4 mile) segment of the line remains in Corcoran to serve on-line industries. The segment between Corcoran and Tulare was abandoned and removed by 1994.

The right-of-way through Tulare was subsequently converted into a bike path, which was opened in 2004. Named the Santa Fe Trail , it is a 5-mile (8.0 km), lighted trail from Prosperity Avenue (east) to Inyo Avenue (west).

=== Tulare to Visalia ===
The rails from Tulare to Loma were removed in 1994. A segment remains in place in Visalia, between "K" Ave (Ambler, now called Billy Goat Junction, also a connection with the SP/VE Visalia Branch) and Avenue 256 (Loma). Loma is the location of the last remaining rail shipper between Calwa and Corcoran. Under SJVR ownership it is called the Loma Industrial Lead. As of 2021, Loma is still listed on the SJVR map, although the connector track is out of service.

=== Visalia to Reedley ===
The segment of line between Visalia and Cutler was not used by the TVRR and was removed by December 1994.

The segment between Cutler, MP 38.5, and Reedley, MP 49.8, as well as the connector track at Cutler to the Porterville-Orosi District (and Orange Cove) was removed by 1998.

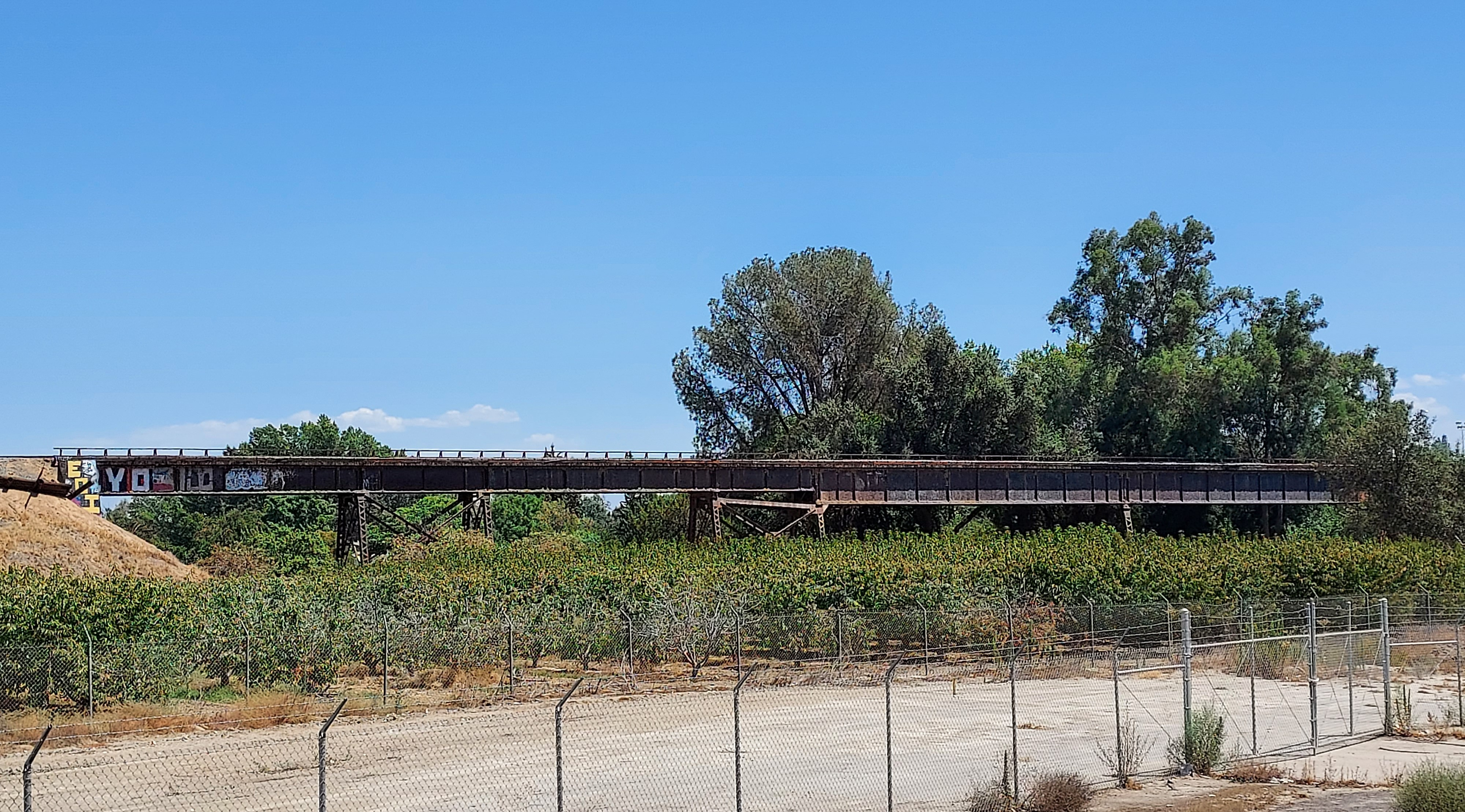
The former ATSF steel span bridge over the Kings River in Reedley

In Reedley, the right-of-way through town has been converted to a bike path. The former ATSF steel span bridge over the Kings River is still in use by the SJVR. The SP bridge just to the west of the ATSF bridge burned down in 1973; SP abandoned a short section of its Exeter Branch and relocated its rails to use the ATSF bridge via a trackage rights agreement. This arrangement is still in use today.

A short segment just northeast of Reedley at LacJac, approximately 1.2 miles, is still in use by the SJVR to serve a large wine and beverage-making industry.

=== Reedley to Calwa ===
The segment from Reedley, MP 51.0, to Calwa, MP 67.0, was removed by 1998.

In Parlier, a portion of the former right-of-way was converted into a park. The park features several rail motifs, including a water tank and simulated railroad track / path, which approximates the original location of the Santa Fe rails.

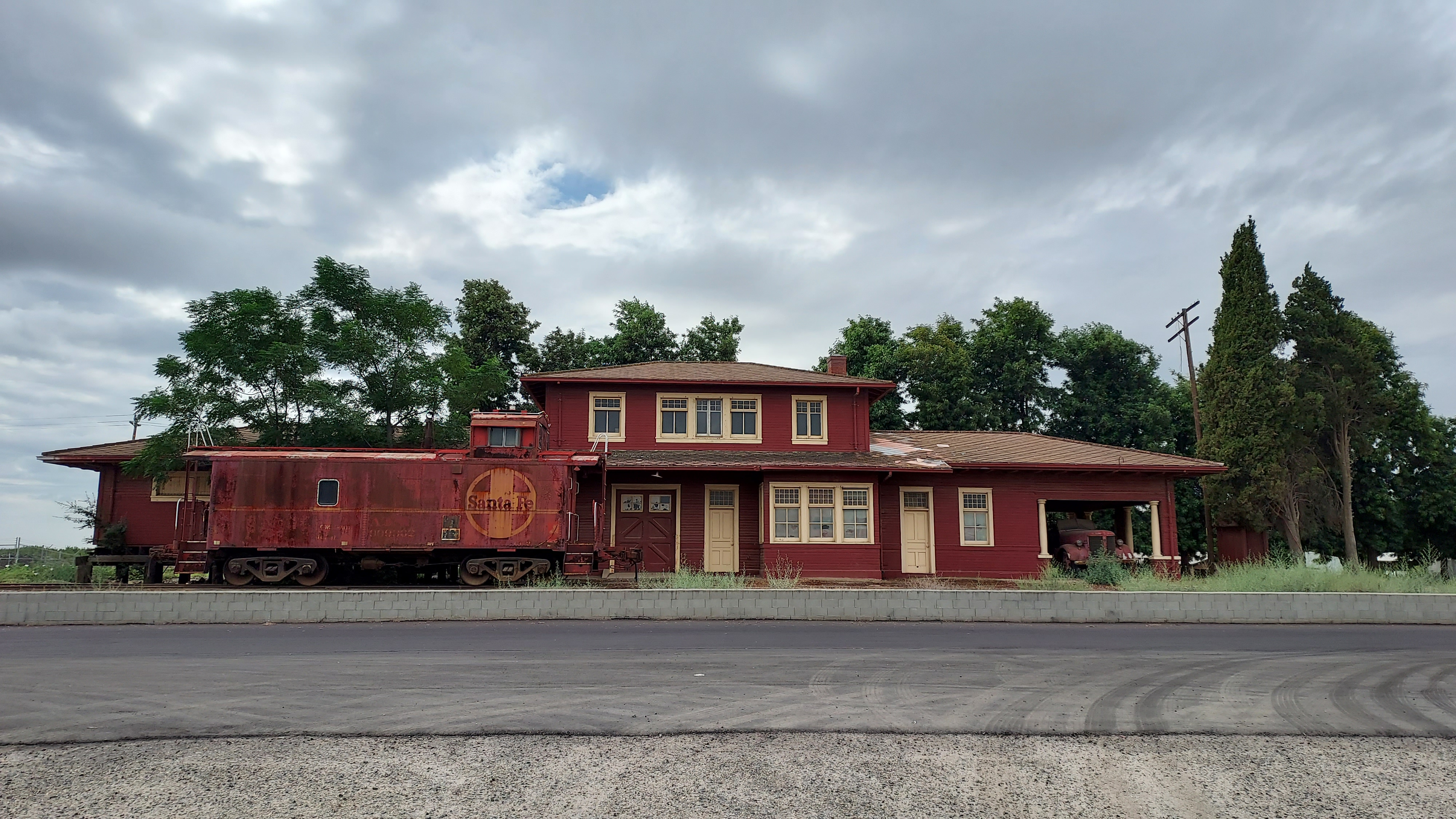
The ATSF depot at Lone Star, CA, as it appeared in 2023

The last remaining depot is at Lone Star. This is a two-story type 2A depot which stands in its original location. Built in 1913, the depot was closed for business in 1958 and is now privately owned.

The short remaining track at Calwa (1.50 mi) is sometimes used to store ballast and Maintenance of way cars, and also serves lineside industries in the area.
