= TVRR =

TVRR can stand for three American railroads:

- The Tanana Valley Railroad, a narrow-gauge railroad in Alaska, operating in the early 20th century
- The Tulare Valley Railroad (its reporting mark), a small railroad network operating 1992–present in California
- The Tuscarora Valley Railroad, a narrow-gauge shortline in Pennsylvania, operating in the late 19th and early 20th centuries
