= San Joaquin Valley Railroad =

Central California freight transport company

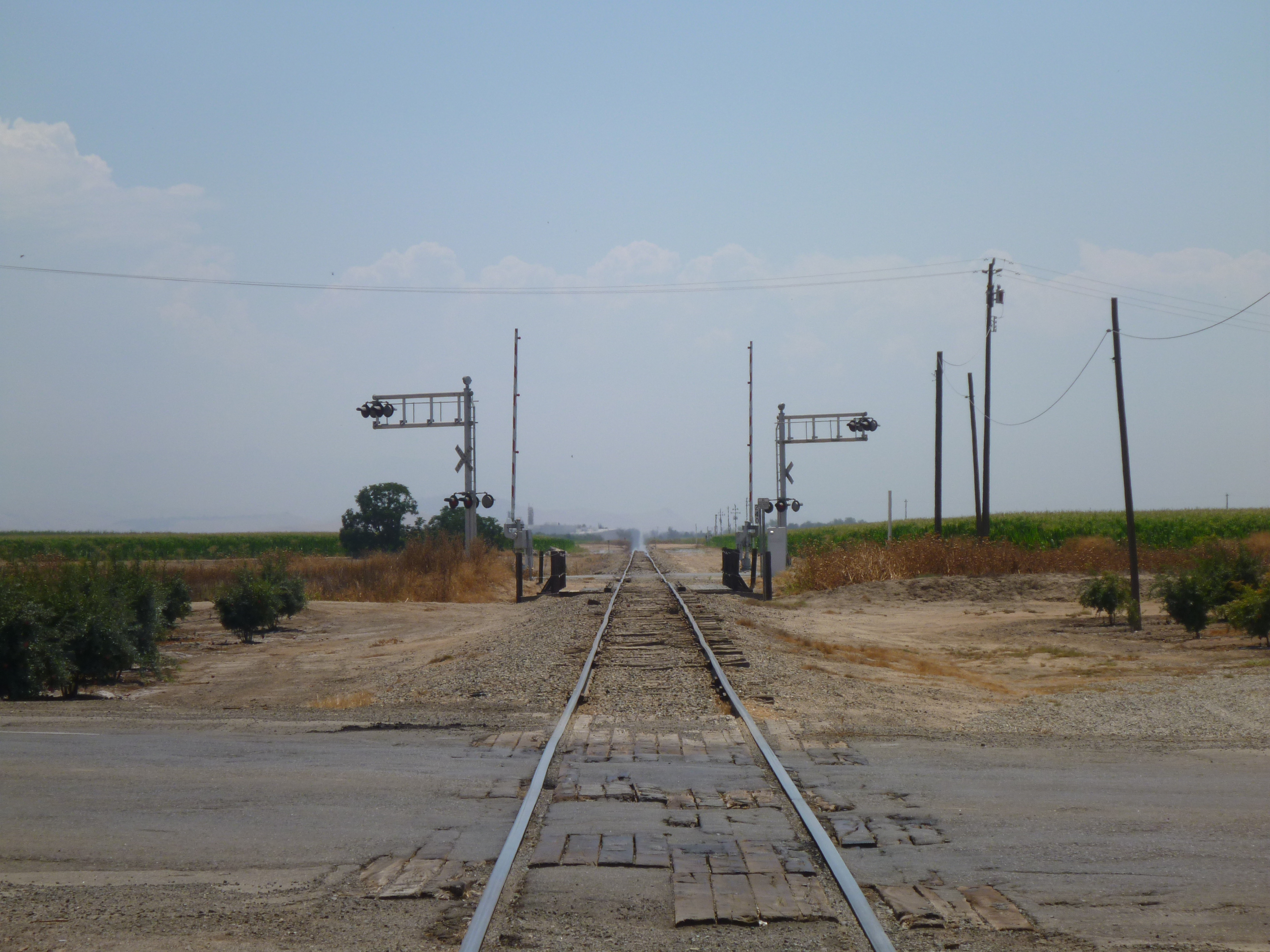
- Exeter Subdivision near Monson, California, in 2012

Overview
- Parent company: Genesee & Wyoming
- Headquarters: Exeter, California
- Reporting mark: SJVR
- Locale: Fresno and Bakersfield area
- Dates of operation: January 2, 1992–present

Technical
- Track gauge: 4 ft 8 1/2 in (1,435 mm) standard gauge
- Length: 371 mi (597 km)

Other
- Website: gwrr.com/sjvr

The San Joaquin Valley Railroad (reporting mark SJVR) is a short line railroad, among several in the Western Region Division of parent company, Genesee & Wyoming Inc. It operates over about 371 miles (597 km) of owned or leased track primarily on several lines in California's Central Valley/San Joaquin Valley around Fresno and Bakersfield. The SJVR has trackage rights over Union Pacific (formerly Southern Pacific) between Fresno, Goshen, Famoso, Bakersfield and Algoso. The SJVR also operated for the Tulare Valley Railroad (TVRR) from Calwa to Corcoran and Famoso.

On January 1, 1992, the SJVR was created to obtain and operate several branch lines from the Southern Pacific. The SJVR at this time operated as three separate legal entities: the SJVR proper, the Tulare Valley Railroad (TVRR), and the Port Railroad. From 1992 to 1997, the SJVR was owned by Kyle Railways. In 1997, SJVR's parent, Kyle Railways, was sold to States Rail. In 2002 SJVR's new parent, States Rail, was purchased by RailAmerica. Genesee & Wyoming Inc. controlled RailAmerica in December 2012. Today the SJVR remains a shortline within the Genesee & Wyoming family of railroads.

There were two former San Joaquin Valley Railroads. One was incorporated by Leland Stanford and Associates in 1868 to build an 11.3-mile (18.2 km) line from Lathrop, California to the Stanislaus River and was consolidated in 1870 into the Central Pacific Railroad. The second San Joaquin Valley Railroad operated from 1892 to 1893 between Fresno and Friant over 24.1 miles (38.8 km) of track and was sold at foreclosure to the Southern Pacific.

In 1992, the SJVR operated the entire former SP line from Fresno to Famoso, but a portion north of Famoso was later abandoned.

SJVR interchanges with the BNSF Railway at Fresno and Bakersfield and with the Union Pacific at Fresno and Goshen Junction.

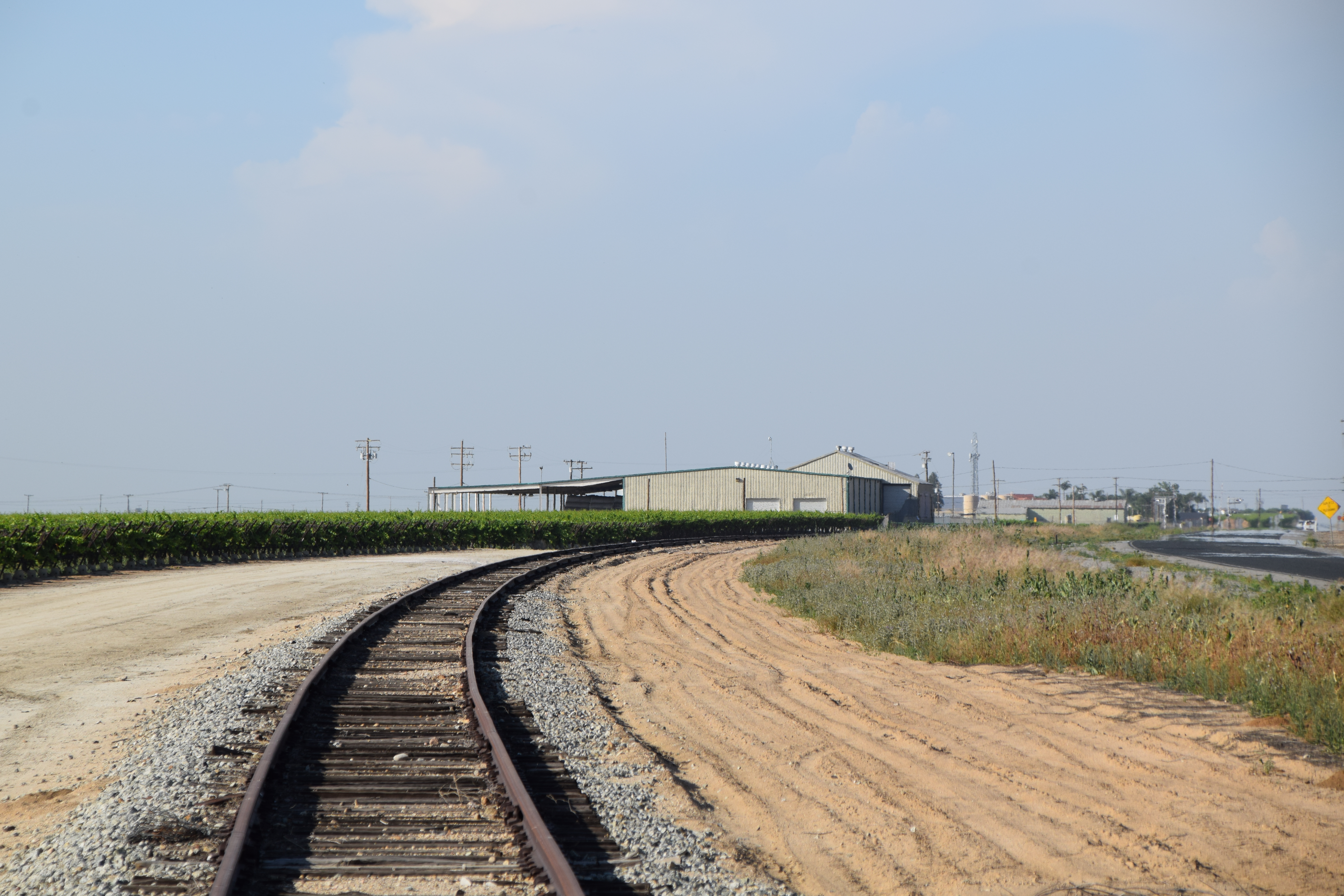
North Joint subdivision (former SP Exeter Branch) near end-of-track at Hollis.

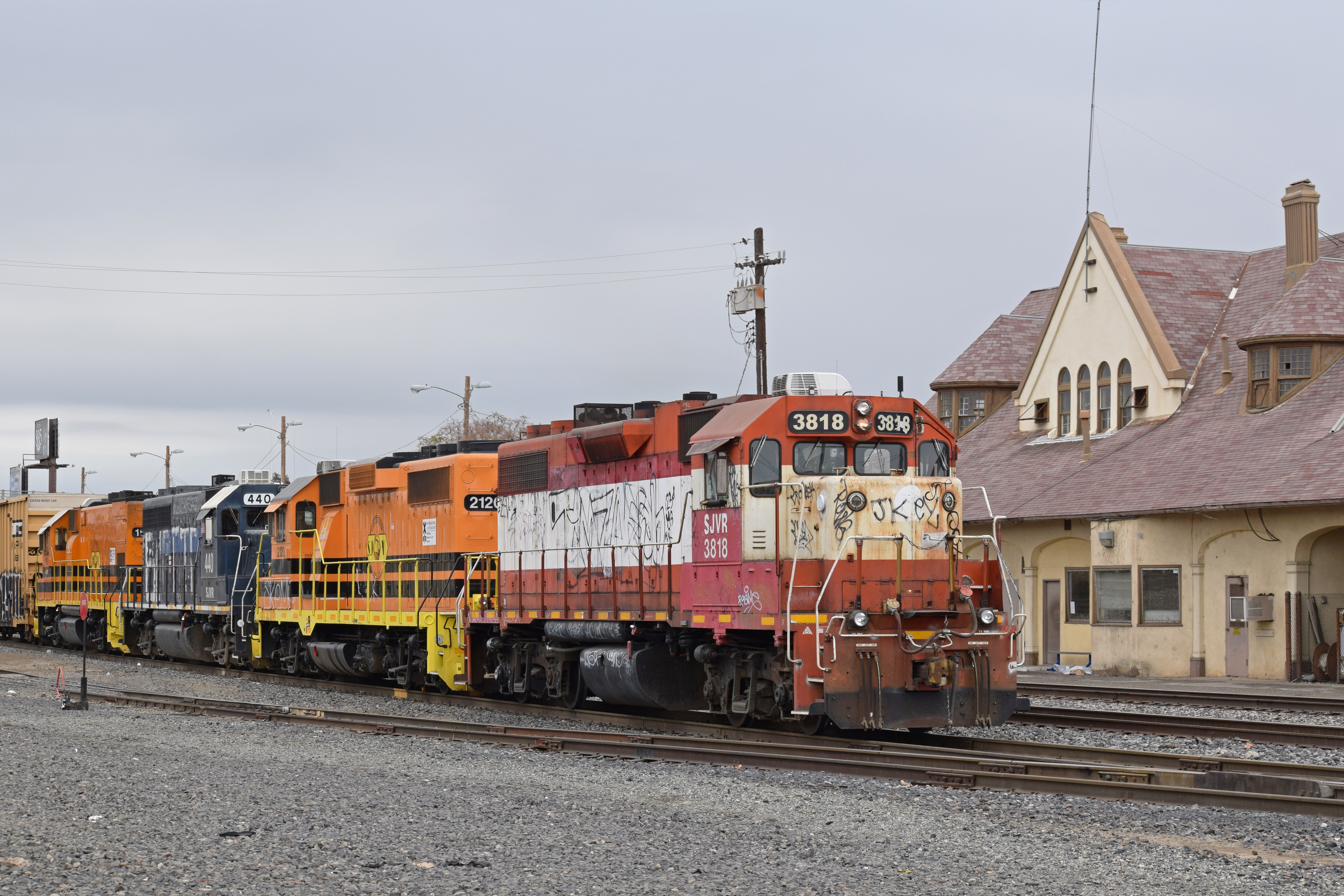
Four different SJVR locomotives in Bakersfield - GP38-2, BL20-2, GP40, and GP15-1.

As of 2023, SJVR has a maximum capacity of 263,000 in Clovis Branch, and 286,000 elsewhere. Also, there are a few interchanges: BNSF (Fresno, California and Bakersfield, California); Union Pacific (Fresno, California; Goshen, California and Bakersfield, California).

== Lines operated by SJVR ==
Line names taken from CPUC data.

- Fresno – Exeter – Strathmore (Exeter Subdivision; former SP)
- Exeter – Visalia – Goshen Jct. (Goshen Subdivision; former SP)
  - Includes Loma Industrial Lead (inactive, Visalia District, former ATSF)
- Goshen Jct. – Hanford – Huron (Hanford Subdivision; former SP)
- Exeter – Lindsay (Porterville Subdivision; former ATSF)
- Burrel – Helm – Tranquility – Ingle (Riverdale Branch; former SP)
- Oxalis – Mendota – Ingle – Kerman – Fresno (West Side Subdivision; former SP)
- Fresno – Clovis (Clovis Subdivision; former ATSF and SP)
- Famoso – Hollis (North Joint Subdivision; inactive; former SP)
- Maltha – Oil Jct. (Oil City Subdivision; former ATSF/SP)
- Oil Jct. – Landco (Landco Subdivision; former ATSF)
- Bakersfield – Gosford – Buttonwillow (Buttonwillow Subdivision; former SP)
- Gosford – Millux (Sunset Subdivision; former Sunset Railway)
- Algoso – Arvin (Arvin Subdivision; former ATSF/SP)
- Trackage rights over UP from Fresno – Algoso (near Bakersfield) via Goshen Jct. (former SP)

== History ==
=== West Side Line ===
This mainline route was formerly known as Southern Pacific's "West Side Line" and at one time extended from Tracy, California and then south through the West side of the San Joaquin Valley (I-5 corridor) via Patterson, Gustine, Newman, Los Banos, Oxalis and then east to Fresno via Ingle and Kerman. California Northern Railroad now operates the northern section of the line from Tracy to Los Banos. SJVR operates the southern section of the line from Oxalis to Fresno and was at one time owned by Port Railroads, Inc. (PRI; also a Kyle subsidiary) and operated by the SJVR. On April 24, 1996, the PRI was merged into the SJVR. Both the PRI and SJVR were already Kyle Railway subsidiaries. The section of track between Los Banos and Oxalis was abandoned by Southern Pacific in 1993 and the tracks were removed soon after.

The Southern Pacific opened the track from Tracy to Newman (37 miles [60 km]) and from Los Banos to Armona (near Fresno) between 1888 and 1892. Southern Pacific's overnight Owl passenger train (#57/58) operated over this line between San Francisco and Los Angeles into 1965.

=== Exeter Subdivision ===
Constructed between 1888 to 1890 by the Southern Pacific, the Exeter Branch ran from a connection near Famoso, California to Fresno, California. SJVR acquired the entire line in 1992. In 1998 the SJVR filed to abandon about 9 miles of track between Hollis and Richgrove. This was approved and the rails were pulled up, severing the line into two parts. In 2008, the Surface Transportation Board approved the abandonment of the section of track between Strathmore and Jovista. This left the communities of Strathmore, Porterville, Terra Bella, Ducor, and Richgrove without any rail service. Tulare County broke off negotiations with the SJVR to purchase this section of track to preserve it for future use and possible reactivation, because beginning in September 2010, the tracks were being removed by the SJVR and the job was completed with the entire line having been pulled up in mid November. By March 2015, the SJVR embargoed the line with the rails spiked at the south end of Exeter with some crossing signals south already having been partially dismantled. This section of track, which runs approximately 8 miles to Lindsay was pending formal abandonment whereupon the rails were expected to be immediately pulled up upon STB approval. However the Cross Valley Corridor passenger train service is planning to upgrade the tracks to Lindsay and rebuild them to Porterville.

=== Clovis Branch ===
This mainline route was built by the Minarets and Western Railway in 1921 and went front from Friant to Wishon and connected with the Southern Pacific which operated the southern portion of the line with joint trackage rights. The Minarets and Western was owned by the Sugar Pine Lumber Company and was built the same year the lumber company was incorporated so that it could haul timber from the forest. During the Great Depression in 1933, the lumber company went bankrupt. The track north of Friant was abandoned and the Pinedale Branch was bought by Southern Pacific, where it was later known as the Pinedale Spur of the Clovis Branch. Southern Pacific later sold the spur and Clovis Branch to the SJVR which abandoned the line above North Sabre Drive in the mid 1990s and today the Pinedale Spur is preserved as the Fresno-Clovis Rail Trail.

=== Visalia District ===
The Visalia District ran from Corcoran, California to Calwa, California. The line was originally built by the San Francisco and San Joaquin Valley Railroad and later acquired by the Atchison, Topeka and Santa Fe Railway. ATSF sold this line to the Tulare Valley Railroad on December 22, 1992. The TVRR did not use the segments from Corcoran to Tulare or Visalia to Cutler. Visalia was served until 1993 and Tulare was served until 1994. By 1994 the rails had been pulled up from Corcoran to Tulare and Visalia to Cutler. TVRR filed to abandon Calwa to Cutler in 1995, and this track was also subsequently removed and was gone by 1998. The only remaining sections are a short section at LacJac (near Reedley) and a 4-mile segment between Visalia and Tulare (Ambler- connection with Goshen Subdivision, to Loma- now called the Loma Industrial Lead, which is operated as part of the Goshen Subdivision).

=== Porterville-Orosi District ===
The Porterville-Orosi District was constructed by the Minkler Southern Railway, itself controlled by the Santa Fe through ownership of the entire capital stock. The line was built in 1913 and 1914. The TVRR acquired this line from the ATSF on December 22, 1992. The line ran from Minkler to Ducor, California; south of Ducor, the ATSF ran via trackage rights on the Southern Pacific's Exeter Branch to Famoso, and then to Bakersfield on the Bakersfield Subdivision, where the line split off and entered the ATSF yard. ATSF abandoned and removed the line from Orange Cove to Minkler in 1973. Most of the remaining trackage was removed by the late 1990s. By the 2000s, few shippers remained on the line. Some shippers remained in Exeter and Lindsay, so this section was retained. One shipper remained at Ultra (near Ducor), where the remaining 6.1 miles of track from Ducor was left intact to serve them. This track was abandoned and removed starting in 2008. As of 2025, remaining sections include the Porterville Subdivision between Exeter and Lindsay, which is currently used mainly for car storage, and the Landco Subdivision in Bakersfield, an important connector between the UP and BNSF lines there.

== Traffic ==
The railroad's main traffic sources are petroleum gas and agricultural products. In 2008, the SJVR hauled around 39,000 carloads.

== Rolling stock ==
The railroad currently operates GP15-1s, GP40-2s, GP38s, GP38-2s, PR30Bs, and SE24Bs.

== Signals ==
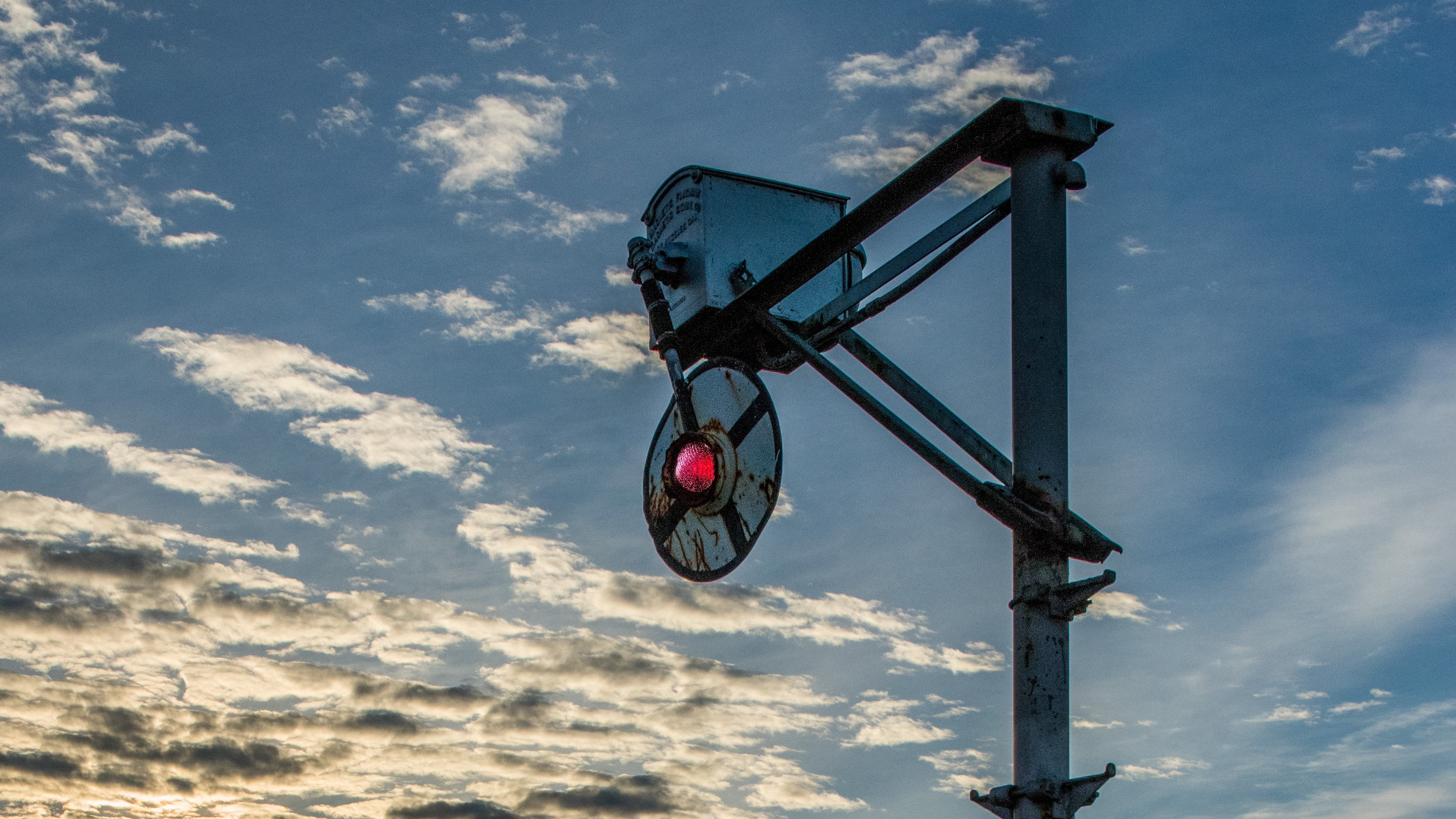
Fulton Street, Fresno CA

The SJVR is the only railroad worldwide that still operates active wigwag signals, which are penedlum-like devices that wave a red lighted disc. The wigwags can be found in Cherry and Van Ness Avenue (The Van Ness Avenue wigwag is now removed, according to Google Street view) thru Downtown Fresno. They have been “hybridized”, which means they still retain their structure, however modern day flashers and crossbucks have been added to the poles. Mainly, the signals are in decent operating condition, and their bells work, and are fully lighted.

However, one now wears an E-bell as its bell no longer rings, and the number continues to dwindle today, as the Cherry wigwag was damaged and ultimately removed in 2020, now all what remains is a weathered pole and the flashers. The Hamilton wigwag was refurbished and now has a working bell and unbent banner.

It is the only one in mint condition amongst the signals.

== See also ==
- List of United States railroads
- List of California railroads
- RailAmerica

Preceded by Winchester and Western Railroad	Short Line Railroad of the Year; 2003	Succeeded by Nittany and Bald Eagle Railroad
