= Port Railroads, Inc. =

Railway line in California, US

Port Railroads
Overview
- Headquarters: Exeter, California
- Reporting mark: PRI
- Locale: San Joaquin Valley, California
- Dates of operation: March 13, 1994–April 26, 1996

Technical
- Track gauge: 4 ft 8 1/2 in (1,435 mm) standard gauge

Port Railroads, Inc. (reporting mark PRI) was a 105.7-mile (170.1 km) shortline railroad owned by Kyle Railways. PRI was formed on March 13, 1994, to take over two Southern Pacific Railroad lines. One of SP's lines was the West Side Line (47.8 miles) between Fresno northwest to Oxalis, California and a branch running from Ingle to Burrel (25.2 miles). The other line was the SP Buttonwillow Branch (32.7 miles) from Bakersfield (Kern Junction) to Buttonwillow, California.

PRI was related to the San Joaquin Valley Railroad. Both PRI and the SJVR were subsidiaries of Kyle Railways. Because PRI and the SJVR were related, the SJVR provided the motive power for PRI. On April 26, 1996, Kyle Railways merged PRI into the SJVR.

PRI handled about 8,000 cars per year (1996 estimate).

== History ==
The Southern Pacific constructed the West Side Line that ran from Tracy down the west side of the San Joaquin Valley to Fresno between 1888-1891. The Buttonwillow Branch was constructed by the Southern Pacific after 1910. The Buttonwillow Branch has about 15 miles (24 km) of track abandoned in the late 1950s east from Buttonwillow to Olig with stations listed as Lokern , Asphalto and McKittrick. Asphalto was the location of a historic Naval Petroleum Reserve No. 1. McKittrick is famous for the McKittrick Tar Pits naturally occurring asphalt tar pits.

According to an article by Don Browen, "the Port Railroad took over the 33-mile (53 km) former Southern Pacific Buttonwillow Branch from Kern Junction to Buttonwillow and 47.6 miles (76.6 km) of S.P.'s former Westside Branch from Fresno to Oxalis. Additionally S.P.'s former 24.6 Riverdale Branch from Ingle on the Westside Branch to Burrel was included in the transaction. This is a long term lease and not a purchase by Kyle Railways. What is the significance of the name Port Railroad? Kyle owned the name Port Railroad which it used for its railroad in San Francisco. When this railroad ceased operations, Kyle had an extra name which it decided would be used for its latest California acquisition. 3 more locomotives, 2037, 2041, and 2042, were obtained for the increased workload."

== See also ==
- List of defunct California railroads
