= Santa Fe Trail (Tulare) =

Rail trail in California, United States

Tulare Santa Fe Trail
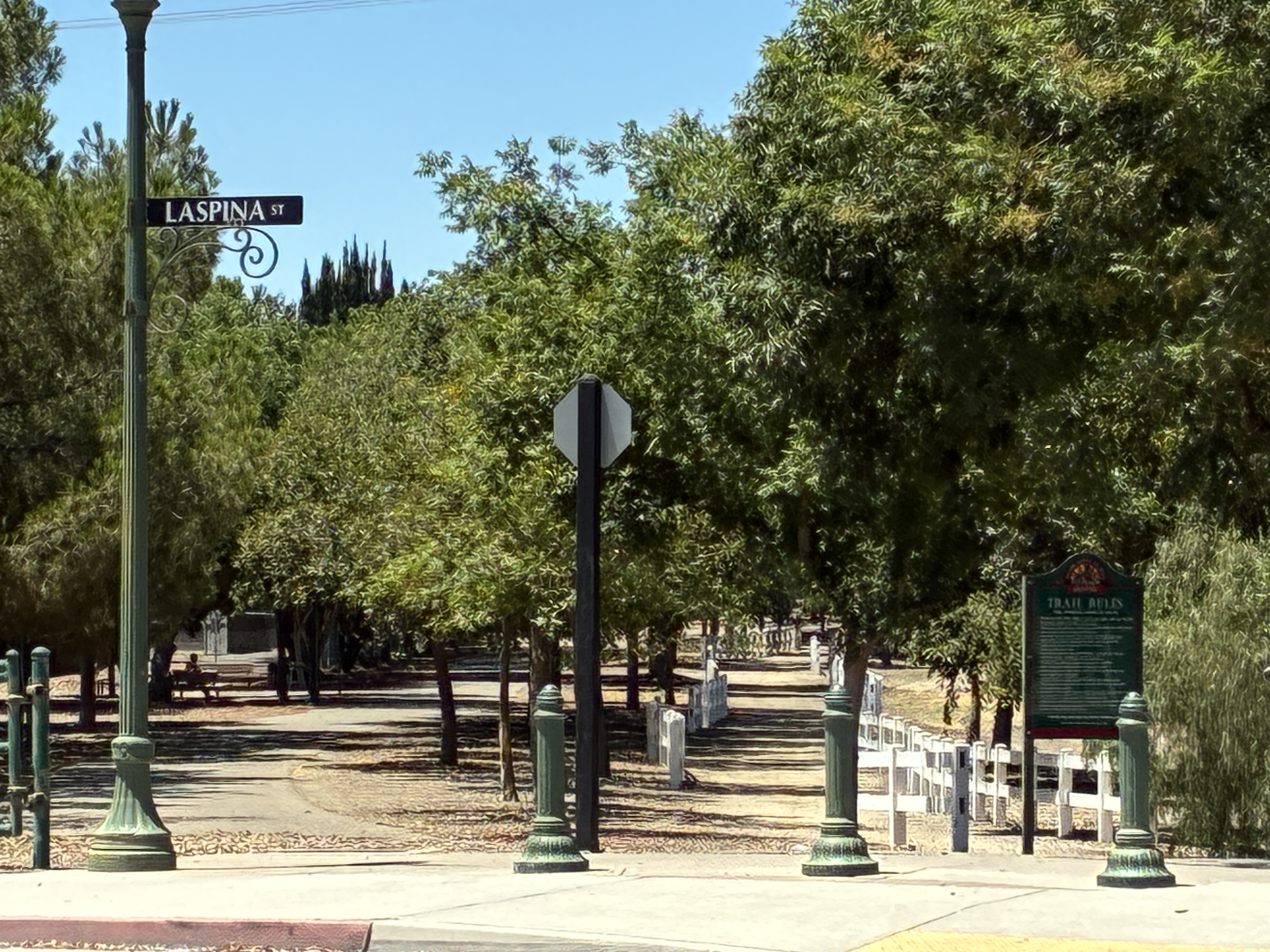
- View of the trail 2026
- Length: 5 miles (8.0 km)
- Location: Tulare, California, U.S.
- Completed: 2004
- Trailheads: Prosperity Avenue (east) and Inyo Avenue (west)
- Use: Multi-use trail
- Surface: Paved
- Maintainer: City of Tulare Parks and Recreation Department
- Website: Official website

Santa Fe Trail is a 5-mile (8.0 km) rail trail in Tulare, California, United States. The trail extends between Prosperity Avenue on the east side of the city and Inyo Avenue on the west side. Maintained by the City of Tulare Parks and Recreation Department, it is used for walking, running, cycling, and other recreational activities.

The trail occupies a former rail line right-of-way in the Tulare and Visalia area. Environmental planning documents describe the corridor as part of a multi-purpose trail connection that follows the historic railroad alignment between Prosperity Avenue and Avenue 272.

== History ==
The Santa Fe Trail occupies a former Atchison, Topeka and Santa Fe Railway right-of-way that formed part of the Visalia District, a branch line serving communities in the southern San Joaquin Valley, including Tulare and Visalia. Following the decline of rail operations, portions of the corridor were abandoned and later identified for conversion into a recreational trail.

Planning for the trail connection was documented in environmental review materials published in 2010 and 2011. The proposed project described a multi-purpose trail following the historic railroad corridor between Prosperity Avenue in Tulare and Avenue 272 toward Visalia, preserving the former rail alignment for pedestrian and bicycle use.

== Current use ==
The Santa Fe Trail is maintained by the City of Tulare Parks and Recreation Department as a multi-use recreational trail for walking, running, and other non-motorized activities.

The City of Tulare also permits portions of the trail to be reserved for organized events, including community walks, runs, and other recreational activities coordinated through the Parks and Recreation Department.

== See also ==
- Visalia District
- Rail trail
- Tulare, California
- List of parks in Tulare, California
