= Sunset Railway =

Railroad in California, USA

The Sunset Railway is a railroad in California, running from Gosford southwest to the South Kern Industrial Center near Millux. It is the remnant of a longer line which ran to Maricopa with a branch to Taft and Shale. It is jointly owned by the Union Pacific Railroad and BNSF Railway and leased to the San Joaquin Valley Railroad.

Originally organized as the Sunset Railroad Company, the railway was built with the plan to provide transportation from the Sunset Oil Field as well as the agricultural district around the dry Kern Lake. The line from Gosford, on the Southern Pacific McKittrick Branch, to Hazelton opened on December 21, 1901. The main line reached Monarch (later renamed Maricopa) on April 1, 1904.

The Sunset Western Railway Company built the branch line from Pentland northwest to Fellows, beginning operation on January 1, 1909. It was extended to Shale in 1911. Both companies had merged into the Sunset Railway Company by 1912.

The companies which owned the railway never owned rolling stock or maintained employees, and instead rented its tracks to be operated by other companies. Under joint ownership, Southern Pacific and the Santa Fe would alternate working the line in periods of five years.

== See also ==
- Other lines operated by the San Joaquin Valley Railroad:
  - Riverdale Branch
  - Exeter Branch
- List of California railroads
