= Riverdale Branch =

The Riverdale Branch of the Southern Pacific Railroad (SP) was a branch line serving the San Joaquin Valley's agricultural area southwest of Fresno. The 42-mile line ran from a connection with the Southern Pacific's West Side Line at Ingle, California, and then ran southeast through Burrel and Riverdale, beyond which it also connected to the Caruthers Branch of the SP. From Riverdale it continued Southeast to Hardwick then south to Armona where it connected to SP's Coalinga Branch.

== Construction of the branch line ==
The Riverdale Branch was built between August 1910 and July 1911 under SP's non-operating subsidiary, the Hanford and Summit Lake Railway. SP operated the line and on October 9, 1917, the line was sold to the SP. SP operated the line as the Riverdale Branch. Grading commenced to the west from Hardwick on August 22, 1910 and rails reached Riverdale one month later. At the other end of the line, construction began at Ingle and built southwest towards Riverdale; by February 1912 five miles (8.0 km) of track was completed between Ingle and Tranquility. The SP then began operating on these two ends of the line. The final and middle section of track, between Tranquility and Riverdale, was completed on April 14, 1912. Originally, the Hanford and Summit Lake Railway proposed to build en electric railroad from Hanford through Grangeville and Hardwick and back through Lemoore and Armona with an extension to Laton.

Tracks between Hardwick and Armona were constructed during a different time period, likely before 1912.

The line between Hardwick and Riverdale was abandoned by the SP in 1952. SP later abandoned the track between Riverdale and Burrel. SP sold the 25.2-mile (40.6 km) line between Ingle and Burrel to Kyle Railway's subsidiary, Port Railroads (PRI), on March 13, 1994. On April 26, 1996, the PRI was sold by Kyle Railways to the San Joaquin Valley Railroad.

== Route ==
- Ingle (Connection with SP's West Side Line)
- Tranquility
- San Joaquin
- Helm
- Burrel
- Riverdale
- Hub
- Hardwick (Connection with SP's Caruthers Branch)
- Grangeville
- Armona (Connection with SP's Coalinga Branch)

== See also ==
- Other lines operated by the San Joaquin Valley Railroad:
  - Sunset Railway
  - Exeter Branch
- List of California railroads
