= Cutler, California =

- census-designated place
- Location in Tulare County and the state of California

- Location in the United States
- Coordinates: 36°31′29″N 119°17′20″W
- Country: United States
- State: California
- County: Tulare

Area
  - Total: 1.22 sq mi (3.17 km^{2})
  - Land: 1.22 sq mi (3.17 km^{2})
  - Water: 0 sq mi (0.00 km^{2}) 0%
- Elevation: 360 ft (110 m)

Population (2020)
  - Total: 4,480
  - Density: 3,661.5/sq mi (1,413.71/km^{2})
- Time zone: UTC-8 (Pacific (PST))
  - Summer (DST): UTC-7 (PDT)
- ZIP code: 93615
- Area code: 559
- FIPS code: 06-17708
- GNIS feature ID: 1658363

Cutler is a community and census-designated place (CDP) in Tulare County, California, United States. The population was 4,480 at the 2020 census, down from 5,000 at the 2010 census.

== Geography ==
Cutler is located at 36°31′29″N 119°17′20″W (36.524791, -119.288991).

According to the United States Census Bureau, the CDP has a total area of 1.2 square miles (3.1 km^{2}), all land.

Cutler is located by the junction of routes 63 and 201.

Cutler is nestled near the base of the Sierra Nevada Mountain Foothills.

== History ==
Rails reached Cutler in 1897. The San Francisco and San Joaquin Valley Railroad established a manned depot and offered passenger and freight service. Cutler was located at mile post 38.50 on the Visalia District. In 1899 the SF&SJV because a part of the Santa Fe Railroad. In 1914, a second rail line, one mile east of town, was laid by the Minkler Southern (a subsidiary of the Santa Fe). A connecting wye was established as well. Cutler remained an important rail junction point through the 1970s. Dwindling freight traffic caused the Santa Fe to sell the rail lines to the Tulare Valley Railroad in 1992. The rails were soon abandoned and removed.

== Demographics ==
Historical population
Census	Pop.	Note	%±
1950	1,768		—
1960	2,191		23.9%
1970	2,503		14.2%
1980	3,149		25.8%
1990	4,450		41.3%
2000	4,491		0.9%
2010	5,000		11.3%
2020	4,480		−10.4%
U.S. Decennial Census; 1860–1870 1880-1890; 1900 1910 1920; 1930 1940 1950; 1960 1970 1980; 1990 2000 2010

Cutler first appeared as an unincorporated place in the 1950 U.S. census; and then as a census designated place in the 1980 U.S. census.

=== 2020 census ===
As of the 2020 census, Cutler had a population of 4,480. The population density was 3,660.1 inhabitants per square mile (1,413.2/km^{2}). The median age was 28.3 years. 34.6% of residents were under the age of 18, 10.4% were aged 18 to 24, 27.7% were aged 25 to 44, 18.6% were aged 45 to 64, and 8.7% were 65 years of age or older. For every 100 females, there were 100.7 males, and for every 100 females age 18 and over there were 101.6 males.

98.5% of residents lived in urban areas, while 1.5% lived in rural areas.

The whole population lived in households. There were 1,122 households, out of which 55.3% had children under the age of 18 living in them. Of all households, 49.8% were married-couple households, 10.2% were cohabiting-couple households, 16.2% were households with a male householder and no spouse or partner present, and 23.7% were households with a female householder and no spouse or partner present. About 13.1% of all households were made up of individuals and 5.1% had someone living alone who was 65 years of age or older. The average household size was 3.99. There were 935 families (83.3% of all households).

There were 1,148 housing units at an average density of 937.9 units per square mile (362.1 units/km^{2}), of which 2.3% were vacant and 97.7% were occupied. Of occupied units, 42.2% were owner-occupied and 57.8% were occupied by renters. The homeowner vacancy rate was 0.8% and the rental vacancy rate was 1.2%.

Racial composition as of the 2020 census
Race	Number	Percent
White	931	20.8%
Black or African American	17	0.4%
American Indian and Alaska Native	86	1.9%
Asian	89	2.0%
Native Hawaiian and Other Pacific Islander	0	0.0%
Some other race	1,968	43.9%
Two or more races	1,389	31.0%
Hispanic or Latino (of any race)	4,309	96.2%

=== Income and poverty ===
In 2023, the US Census Bureau estimated that the median household income was $62,151, and the per capita income was $21,598. About 18.4% of families and 22.7% of the population were below the poverty line.

=== 2010 census ===
The 2010 United States census reported that Cutler had a population of 5,000. The population density was 6,194.8 inhabitants per square mile (2,391.8/km^{2}). The racial makeup of Cutler was 2,421 (48.4%) White, 50 (1.0%) African American, 53 (1.1%) Native American, 64 (1.3%) Asian, 1 (0.0%) Pacific Islander, 2,241 (44.8%) from other races, and 170 (3.4%) from two or more races. Hispanic or Latino of any race were 4,829 persons (96.6%).

The Census reported that 5,000 people (100% of the population) lived in households, 0 (0%) lived in non-institutionalized group quarters, and 0 (0%) were institutionalized.

There were 1,085 households, out of which 729 (67.2%) had children under the age of 18 living in them, 651 (60.0%) were opposite-sex married couples living together, 190 (17.5%) had a female householder with no husband present, 141 (13.0%) had a male householder with no wife present. There were 114 (10.5%) unmarried opposite-sex partnerships, and 7 (0.6%) same-sex married couples or partnerships. 65 households (6.0%) were made up of individuals, and 28 (2.6%) had someone living alone who was 65 years of age or older. The average household size was 4.61. There were 982 families (90.5% of all households); the average family size was 4.55.

The population was spread out, with 1,859 people (37.2%) under the age of 18, 681 people (13.6%) aged 18 to 24, 1,376 people (27.5%) aged 25 to 44, 826 people (16.5%) aged 45 to 64, and 258 people (5.2%) who were 65 years of age or older. The median age was 24.6 years. For every 100 females, there were 113.9 males. For every 100 females age 18 and over, there were 119.8 males.

There were 1,136 housing units at an average density of 1,407.4 per square mile (543.4/km^{2}), of which 474 (43.7%) were owner-occupied, and 611 (56.3%) were occupied by renters. The homeowner vacancy rate was 1.0%; the rental vacancy rate was 4.0%. 2,137 people (42.7% of the population) lived in owner-occupied housing units and 2,863 people (57.3%) lived in rental housing units.

Cutler much like many communities in the Central Valley experienced an influx of immigrants from Mexico over the past 50 years. Where once it was an Anglo dominated community is now primarily a Hispanic dominated community. The larger populations from Mexico that encompass the community derive from Michoacan, Zacatecas and Nuevo León with a smaller population deriving from Sinaloa. Filipinos have also made their presence felt as they have added their rich culture to both communities of Cutler-Orosi. Filipinos along with their distinct dialect of Ilocano and Tagalog have introduced their rich foods such as Lumpia, Adobo, and Lechon to name a few.

== Government ==
In the California State Legislature, Cutler is in the 16th senatorial district, represented by Democrat Melissa Hurtado, and the 33rd Assembly district, represented by Republican Alexandra Macedo.

In the United States House of Representatives, Cutler is in California's 21st congressional district, represented by Democrat Jim Costa

== Education ==
Cutler is served by the Cutler-Orosi Joint Unified School District.
