= Tulare Valley Railroad =

American short-line railroad in California

Overview
- Headquarters: Corporate at Salt Lake City, Utah
- Reporting mark: TVRR
- Locale: Tulare County, California
- Dates of operation: 1992–2008

Technical
- Track gauge: 4 ft 8 1/2 in (1,435 mm) standard gauge
- Track length: 180 miles (290 km)

The Tulare Valley Railroad (/tʊˈlɛəri/) (reporting mark TVRR) was a short line railroad operational from December 22, 1992 after acquiring several former Santa Fe Railway branch lines in California's San Joaquin Valley on October 20, 1992. The company was formed by Morris Kulmer & Kern Schumucher (of A&K Railroad Materials) and Michael Van Wagenen of Kyle Railways. A&K Railroad Materials specializes in dismantling railroad lines and selling relay (used) track materials. Kyle Railways operates several shortline railroads throughout the United States.

The TVRR operated 158 miles (254 km) of track from December 1992 to May 1998. The track consisted of the following routes:

- Magunden to Arvin, 17 mi (27 km) (Arvin Subdivision)
- Oil Jct. to Maltha, 4 mi (6.4 km) (Oil City Subdivision)
- Ducor to Cutler, 52 mi (84 km) (Porterville Subdivision)
- Corcoran to Calwa, 66 mi (106 km) (Corcoran to Tulare abandon)
- Wyeth to Orange Cove and Minkler, 9.4 mi (15.1 km) (Visalia Subdivision)
- Hammond to Cameo, 6 mi (9.7 km)

The TVRR later abandoned the following tracks:

- Corcoran to Tulare
- Visalia to Cutler 14.7 mi (23.7 km)
- Wyeth to Orange Cove, 13.3 mi (21.4 km)
- Orange Cove to Minkler

In May 1998, most of the remaining track was sold to the San Joaquin Valley Railroad.
