= Visalia Electric Railroad =

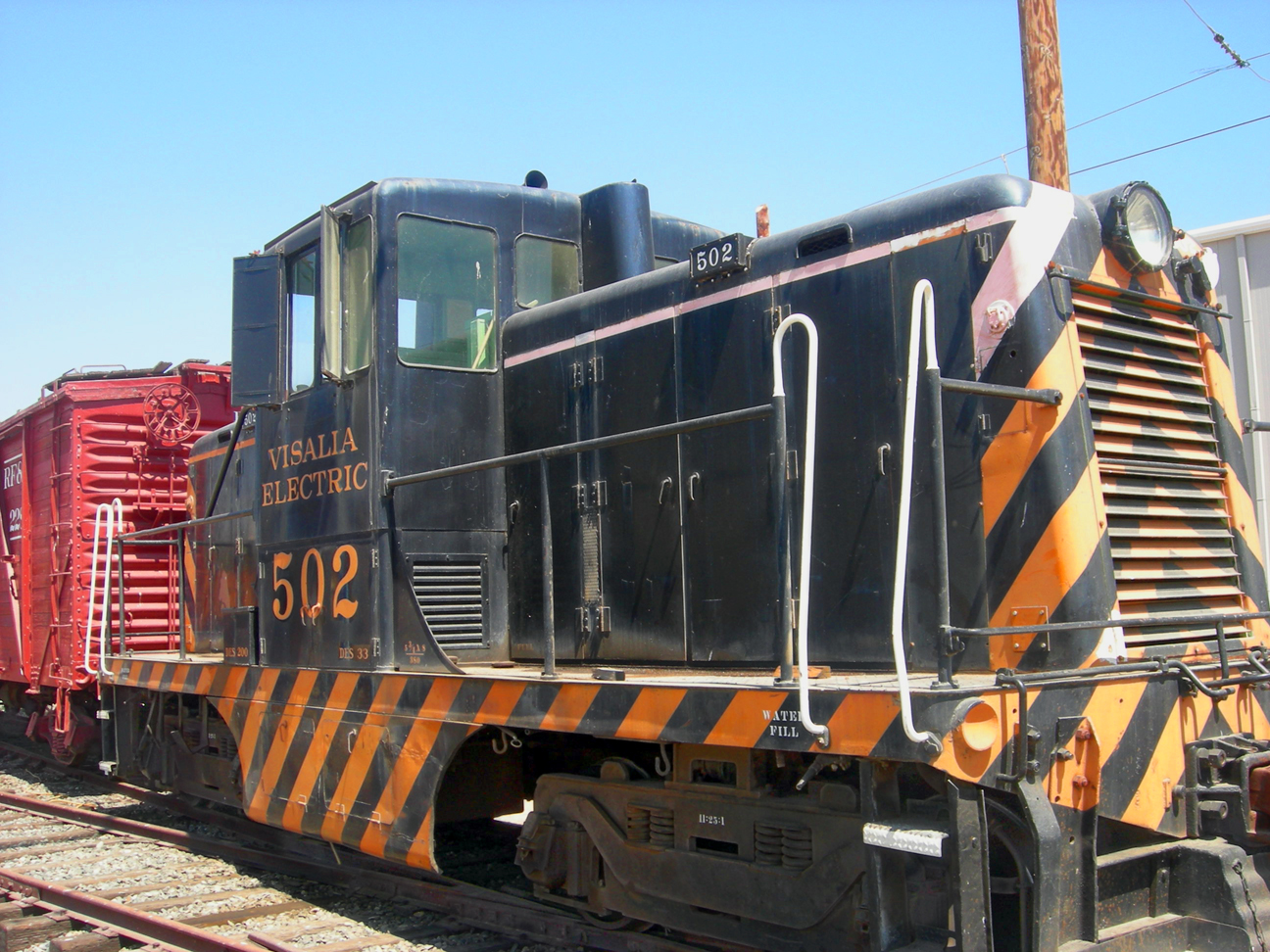
- Visalia Electric No. 502 GE 44-ton switcher

Overview
- Headquarters: Visalia, California
- Locale: Tulare County, California
- Dates of operation: 1904–1992
- Successor: Southern Pacific Railroad

Technical
- Electrification: 3,300 V 15 Hz AC
- Length: 68 miles (109 km)

The Visalia Electric Railroad, a wholly owned subsidiary of the Southern Pacific Railroad (SP), began as an electric interurban railroad in Tulare County, California, United States. The railroad was incorporated on April 22, 1904. Passenger service was discontinued in 1924, and the electrification was removed in 1944. Subsequent operation was by diesel locomotive. The railroad was closed in 1992.

The Visalia Electric used the unusual choice of 15 Hz AC at 3,300 Volts carried by overhead wire, with pantographs on the cars for pickup. Parent SP intended this as a test bed for main line, long distance electrification of its own lines in the area, a project that never came to fruition. For a short time in 1950–1951 the Visalia Electric briefly interchanged with the ATSF due to the bridge over the Kaweah River being washed out. The ATSF was seen by the SP as a rival, so for most of the life of the Visalia Electric only interchanged with its parent SP.

== Origin ==
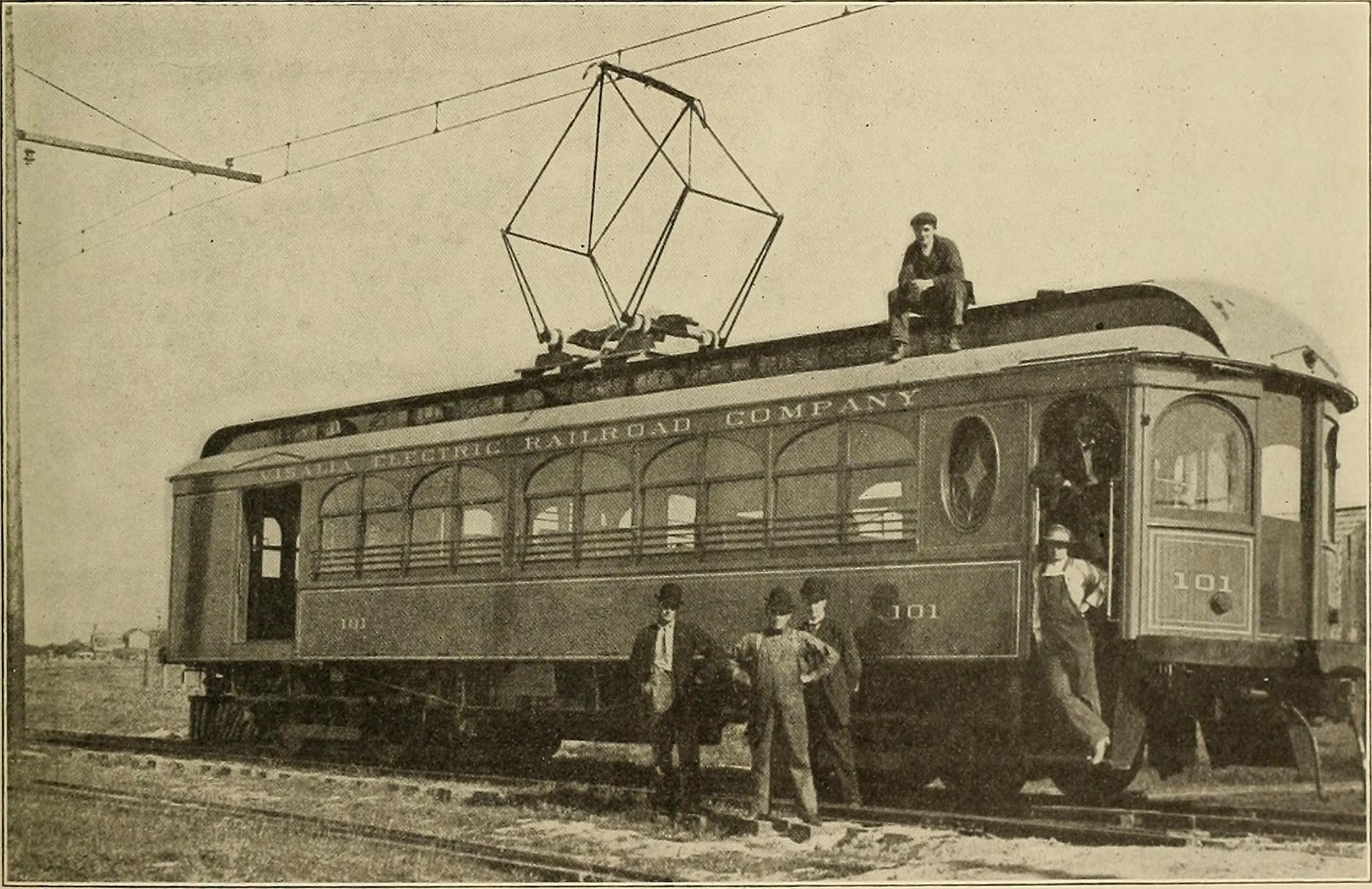
Visalia Electric Railroad train, 1910

The Central Pacific line coming south from Fresno reached Goshen in the summer of 1872. In response, The Visalia Railroad Company was incorporated May 19, 1874 and a seven-mile spur from Goshen was completed August 14, 1874. In 1899 the spur was leased to the Southern Pacific Railroad. By November 29, 1898 the rails had been extended southeastward from Visalia to Southern Pacific's East Side Line at Exeter, a distance of ten miles.

In July 1881 Editor-Publisher Ben M. Maddox (see Ben Maddox Way) of the Visalia Daily Times began promoting hydroelectric power from John Hays Hammond's Mount Whitney Power Company on the Kaweah River, which emerges from the Sierra Nevada Mountains about fifteen miles northeast of Visalia. In June 1899 power began to flow from Hammond, a little over three miles upstream from Three Rivers. Potentially producing 1,800 horsepower (1,300 kW), the power company actually sold 700 horsepower (520 kW).

As early as September 10, 1891 Ben Maddox proposed an electric interurban railroad for Tulare County to make use of the extra generating capacity. Around 1900 John Hays Hammond and Albert G. Wishon propose an electric railroad from Visalia to Three Rivers (about 30 miles). The Visalia Electric Railroad Company was incorporated April 22, 1904.

=== Visalia Railroad steam locomotives ===
Number	Builder	Type	Date	Works number	Notes
1	Baldwin Locomotive Works	2-4-4 tank locomotive	1877	4102	
2	Baldwin Locomotive Works	2-4-4 tank locomotive	1877	4226	became Southern Pacific #1204>#1009 used as Fresno, California roundhouse switcher from 1898 to 1901; scrapped in 1919
3	Baldwin Locomotive Works	0-4-4 tank locomotive	1886	8251	

== Construction ==
Ground was broken March 15, 1905 on the construction of 11 miles (18 km) of track from Exeter to Lemon Cove. Operations began on July 1, 1906 using steam locomotives. On February 22, 1908, the system was first electrified from Visalia to Lime Kiln (Terminus Beach). The existing Southern Pacific tracks from Visalia to Exeter were electrified and used as the first leg of the system for passenger service, but freight loads were interchanged with Southern Pacific steam powered freight trains at Exeter. Electric operations began on March 5, 1908 utilizing two combination passenger with baggage section motor cars with pantographs for current pickup from the overhead wire, two passenger only motor cars similarly equipped, two unpowered passenger cars for powered cars to tow, and a 47-ton Baldwin-Westinghouse box cab freight locomotive. Motor powered equipment carried on-board transformers and rectifiers to convert the 3300-volt AC to the DC required by the traction motors. The railroad was treated as a test bed in Southern Pacific's electrification research, as the system was considered for more widespread deployment in the valley as well as use in the Sierra Nevada mountains if found to be successful.

The line originated at the Visalia train station on the southeast corner of Garden and Oak Streets. In 1916 a new depot was built on the block just west, the second block north and the second block east of the center of town (Court and Main Streets). The stations served both the Southern Pacific and the Visalia Electric.

In 1907 and 1908, offices, the main substation, a carbarn, and a rail yard were built in Exeter to serve as the operations center of the railroad. In 1909 the line was extended from Citro Junction, just north of Lemon Cove, west through what became Woodlake to Redbanks with a spur north to Elderwood. This rail termination was the gateway to Sequoia National Park. By 1912 the timetable included 23 daily passenger trains through Exeter.

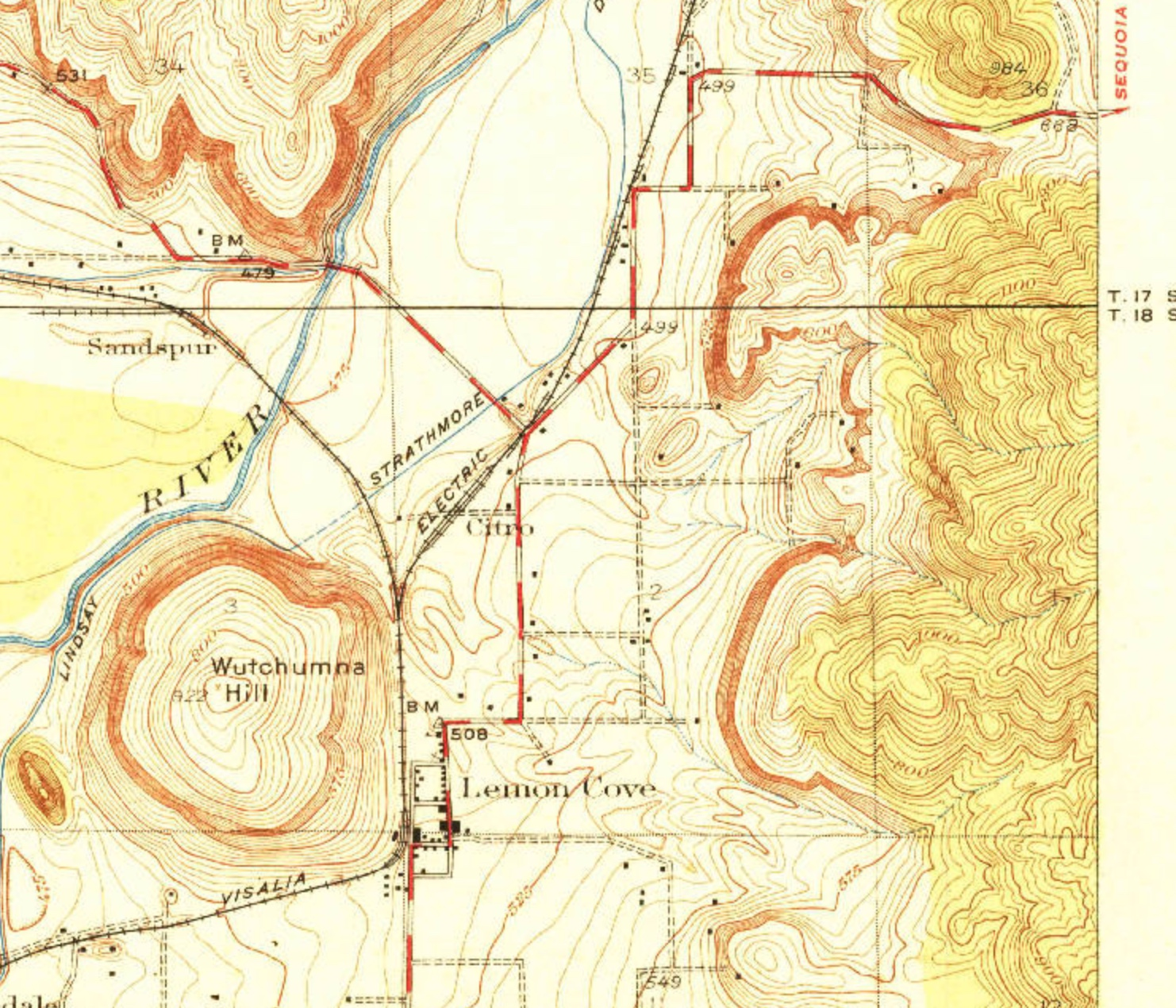
Rail terminus for Sequoia NP

The line was extended from Exeter to Strathmore in 1916–1918. This part of the line was not electrified, but used two 64-ton, 350 hp (260 kW) General Electric model GES gas-electric locomotives numbered 401 and 402 built for Southern Pacific as the third and fourth internal combustion, electric transmission locomotives manufactured in the United States. The line extended 16.4 miles (26.4 km) south, paralleling the Atchison, Topeka, and Santa Fe line, to Strathmore.

An isolated segment east of Porterville was built in 1916; it went from Tule Jct (1 mile east of Porterville) to Magnolia with a spur to Sunland. A proposed extension past Porterville to Ducor was never built. On August 1, 1919 this line was conveyed to the Atchison, Topeka, and Santa Fe Railroad.

Locomotives on the electrified part of the railroad used single-phase, 15-hertz electric current at 3,300 volts drawn from an overhead catenary and converted to DC on board for use by the traction motors. Three-phase, 60-hertz electric current at 35,000 volts was bought from the Mount Whitney Power Company and converted at Exeter. A single bracket-type catenary using 7/16-inch (11 mm) steel messenger was suspended 22 feet (6.7 m) above the rail on poles 120 feet (37 m) apart, supporting 3/0 trolley wire. The locomotives used sliding shoe-type pantograph trolley exerting an upward force of 10 pounds (4.5 kg) on the wire.

== Operation ==
March 10, 1908 marked the official start of electric operation. Steam locomotives had been used previously. On November 11, 1944 all electric propulsion ended: flashovers and deterioration of equipment made gas-electric and diesel-electric a better choice for propulsion. The copper wires were immediately removed and salvaged to meet wartime copper demands. Two GE 44-ton switchers in Southern Pacific's tiger-stripe paint scheme lettered Visalia Electric and numbered 501 and 502 began handling the freight trains in September 1945. The GE locomotives were replaced by a variety of Southern Pacific ALCO switchers from 1971 to 1980. Southern Pacific EMD SW900s numbered 1196 and 1197 took over in 1980, and were replaced by EMD GP9s for the final few years of service.

The railroad thrived by transporting produce grown in one of the richest agricultural areas of the nation. Oranges were produced in the greatest quantity; but the line also carried plums, peaches, lemons, grapes, dairy products, and other produce. Visalia Electric originated as many as 44 carloads daily during the harvest peak.

At its maximum extent the Visalia Electric Railroad consisted of two main lines. The electrified line went from Visalia east through Exeter, thence north and west to Redbanks, a total distance of 29.0 miles (46.7 km). The line had two major spurs: 1.4 miles (2.3 km) from Citro Junction to Terminus and 4.5 miles (7.2 km) from Woodlake Junction to Elderwood. The second main line, non-electrified, extended south 17.877 miles (28.770 km) from Exeter to Strathmore.

== Fragmentary lines ==
The Visalia Electric Railroad also operated three fragmentary lines in the early Twentieth Century:

The Chowchilla Pacific Railway operated a line that ran 10 miles from Chowchilla southwest to Dairyland from 1924 to 1928. It was sold to the Southern Pacific in 1936.

The San Jose District of the Visalia Electric Railroad was formerly part of the Peninsular Railway, which consisted mainly of spur lines to Bascome, Linda Vista, & Berryessa. The Visalia Electric operated it from 1934 to 1938.

The Fresno Traction Company ran 3.5 miles (5.6 km) in the City of Fresno from December 1, 1934 to 1938. It ran through a residential neighborhood and was shut down as a consequence of noise complaints.

== Decline and end ==
Passenger revenues peaked in 1912 as the availability of automobiles running on well-paved roads provided a more convenient alternative to the interurban railroad. Passenger service was discontinued on August 31, 1924. The electric overhead from Visalia to Exeter (10.1 miles) was removed in 1925. Beginning in the 1940s, freight shipments began a steady decline, from 2,355 carloads (1948) to 1,400 carloads (1955), to 1,260 carloads (1960), to 695 (1978), to 195 (1986), to 50 (1989). While productivity of produce in Tulare County was increasing, the decline in freight shipments was initiated by increasing competition from trucks, and accelerated as Southern Pacific lost interest in meeting the service schedules required for perishable produce. Southern Pacific reduced service to Exeter from six to three days per week in 1984; and retirement of their aging refrigerator car fleet left them unable to meet shipping demand for the 1984–1985 navel orange harvest.

Piece by piece abandonment of the railroad began in 1942 with the abandonment of the line from Strathmore to El Mirador. The segment from El Mirador to Fayette was abandoned in the summer of 1953. Final abandonment of the Strathmore branch occurred in 1973 with the rails removed by June. Visalia Electric's fixed labor costs discouraged continuation of the low frequency traffic remaining after the produce shippers sought better service. The railroad's employees were non-union with a guaranteed annual wage. The last run on the railroad occurred on September 6, 1990 and abandonment was requested August 7, 1992.
