= Ducor, California =

Ducor
- Unincorporated Community; Census Designated Place
- Location in Tulare County and the state of California

- Location in the United States
- Coordinates: 35°53′32″N 119°2′53″W
- Country: United States
- State: California
- County: Tulare

Area
  - Total: 0.56 sq mi (1.44 km^{2})
  - Land: 0.56 sq mi (1.44 km^{2})
  - Water: 0 sq mi (0.00 km^{2}) 0%
- Elevation: 548 ft (167 m)

Population (2020)
  - Total: 616
  - Density: 1,106.1/sq mi (427.08/km^{2})
- Time zone: UTC-8 (Pacific (PST))
  - Summer (DST): UTC-7 (PDT)
- ZIP code: 93218
- Area code: 559
- FIPS code: 06-20032
- GNIS feature ID: 0241659

Ducor is a census-designated place (CDP) in Tulare County, California, United States. The population was 616 at the 2020 census, up from 612 at the 2010 census. Ducor is an abbreviation of an earlier name, Dutch Corners, which was given because several early settler families were German. The word "Dutch" in this case derives from German deutsch "German".

== Geography ==
Ducor is located at 35°53′32″N 119°2′53″W (35.892176, -119.048079).

According to the United States Census Bureau, the CDP has a total area of 0.6 square miles (1.6 km^{2}), all land.

== Demographics ==
Historical population
Census	Pop.	Note	%±
2000	504		—
2010	612		21.4%
2020	616		0.7%
U.S. Decennial Census; 1860–1870 1880-1890; 1900 1910 1920; 1930 1940 1950; 1960 1970 1980; 1990 2000 2010

Ducor first appeared as a census designated place in the 2000 U.S. census.

=== 2020 ===
The 2020 United States census reported that Ducor had a population of 616. The population density was 1,105.9 inhabitants per square mile (427.0/km^{2}). The racial makeup of Ducor was 123 (20.0%) White, 1 (0.2%) African American, 7 (1.1%) Native American, 12 (1.9%) Asian, 0 (0.0%) Pacific Islander, 358 (58.1%) from other races, and 115 (18.7%) from two or more races. Hispanic or Latino of any race were 558 persons (90.6%).

The whole population lived in households. There were 151 households, out of which 86 (57.0%) had children under the age of 18 living in them, 84 (55.6%) were married-couple households, 10 (6.6%) were cohabiting couple households, 27 (17.9%) had a female householder with no partner present, and 30 (19.9%) had a male householder with no partner present. 16 households (10.6%) were one person, and 8 (5.3%) were one person aged 65 or older. The average household size was 4.08. There were 128 families (84.8% of all households).

The age distribution was 208 people (33.8%) under the age of 18, 70 people (11.4%) aged 18 to 24, 157 people (25.5%) aged 25 to 44, 115 people (18.7%) aged 45 to 64, and 66 people (10.7%) who were 65 years of age or older. The median age was 28.1 years. For every 100 females, there were 94.9 males.

There were 151 housing units at an average density of 271.1 units per square mile (104.7 units/km^{2}), which were all occupied, 99 (65.6%) by homeowners and 52 (34.4%) by renters.

=== 2010 ===
The 2010 United States census reported that Ducor had a population of 612. The population density was 1,002.9 inhabitants per square mile (387.2/km^{2}). The racial makeup of Ducor was 251 (41.0%) White, 0 (0.0%) African American, 15 (2.5%) Native American, 20 (3.3%) Asian, 0 (0.0%) Pacific Islander, 302 (49.3%) from other races, and 24 (3.9%) from two or more races. Hispanic or Latino of any race were 502 persons (82.0%).

The Census reported that 612 people (100% of the population) lived in households, 0 (0%) lived in non-institutionalized group quarters, and 0 (0%) were institutionalized.

There were 142 households, out of which 89 (62.7%) had children under the age of 18 living in them, 103 (72.5%) were opposite-sex married couples living together, 13 (9.2%) had a female householder with no husband present, 16 (11.3%) had a male householder with no wife present. There were 12 (8.5%) unmarried opposite-sex partnerships, and 1 (0.7%) same-sex married couples or partnerships. 6 households (4.2%) were made up of individuals, and 1 (0.7%) had someone living alone who was 65 years of age or older. The average household size was 4.31. There were 132 families (93.0% of all households); the average family size was 4.40.

The population was spread out, with 200 people (32.7%) under the age of 18, 90 people (14.7%) aged 18 to 24, 135 people (22.1%) aged 25 to 44, 136 people (22.2%) aged 45 to 64, and 51 people (8.3%) who were 65 years of age or older. The median age was 27.6 years. For every 100 females, there were 104.0 males. For every 100 females age 18 and over, there were 113.5 males.

There were 154 housing units at an average density of 252.4 per square mile (97.5/km^{2}), of which 105 (73.9%) were owner-occupied, and 37 (26.1%) were occupied by renters. The homeowner vacancy rate was 0.9%; the rental vacancy rate was 11.9%. 434 people (70.9% of the population) lived in owner-occupied housing units and 178 people (29.1%) lived in rental housing units.

== Government ==
In the California State Legislature, Ducor is in the 16th senatorial district, represented by Democrat Melissa Hurtado, and the 33rd Assembly district, represented by Republican Alexandra Macedo.

In the United States House of Representatives, Ducor is in California's 22nd congressional district, represented by Republican David Valadao.

== Education ==
The CDP is served by the Ducor Union Elementary School District and by the Porterville Unified School District for grades 9–12.
