= Ecology of the Sierra Nevada =

Ecological features of the Sierra Nevadas

Sierra Nevada forests
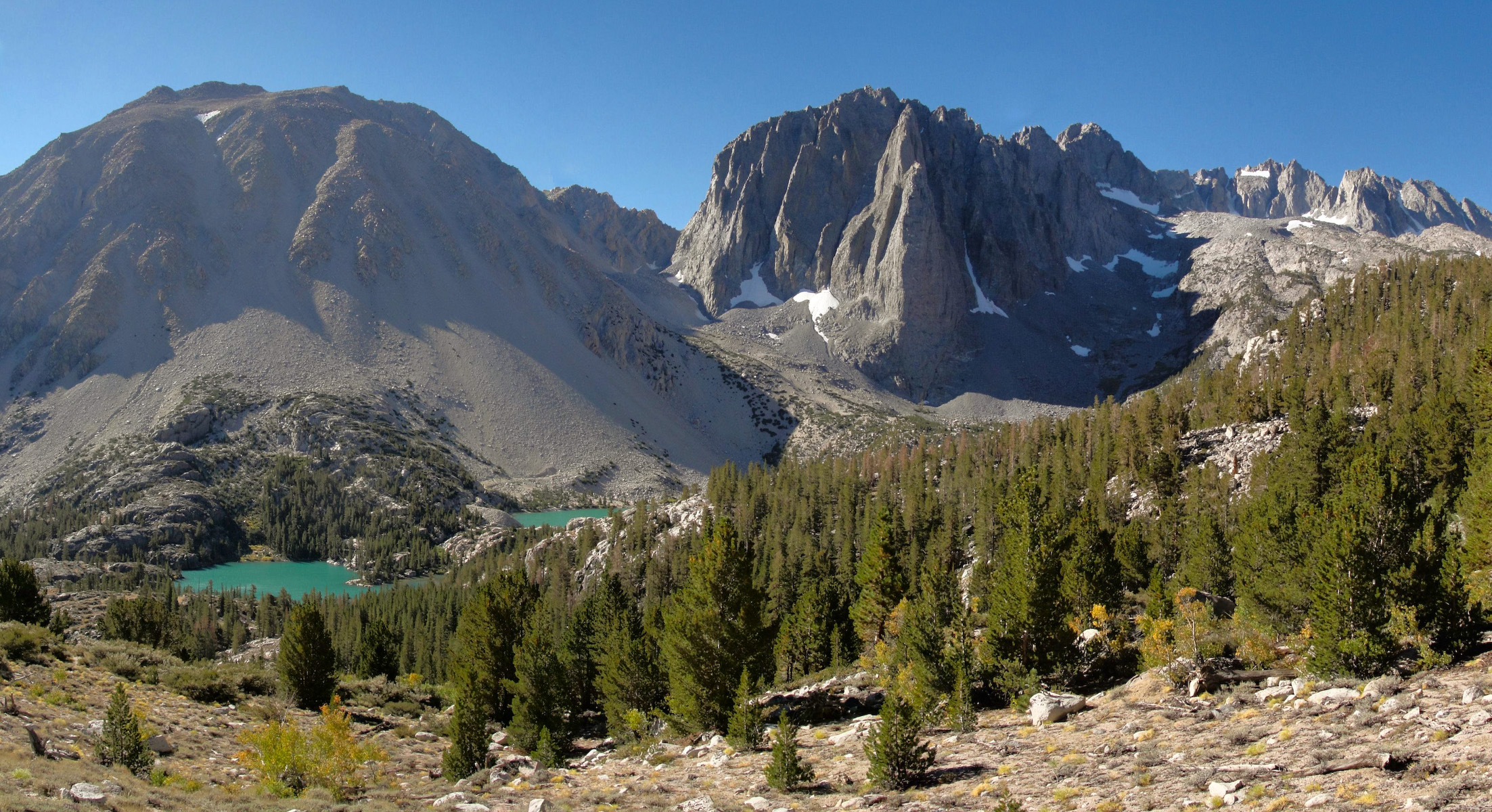
- Subalpine forest at the base of Temple Crag

Ecology
- Realm: Nearctic
- Biome: Temperate coniferous forests
- Bird species: 197
- Mammal species: 103

Geography
- Country: United States of America
- State: California, Nevada

Conservation
- Global 200: Yes
- Habitat loss: 1.0785%
- Protected: 72.55%

See Sierra Nevada for general information about the mountain range in the United States.

The ecology of the Sierra Nevada, located in the U.S. states of California and Nevada, is diverse and complex. The combination of climate, topography, moisture, and soils influences the distribution of ecological communities across an elevation gradient from 500 to 14,500 feet (200 to 4,400 m). Biotic zones range from scrub and chaparral communities at lower elevations, to subalpine forests and alpine meadows at the higher elevations. Particular ecoregions that follow elevation contours are often described as a series of belts that follow the length of the Sierra Nevada. There are many hiking trails, paved and unpaved roads, and vast public lands in the Sierra Nevada for exploring the many different biomes and ecosystems.

The western and eastern Sierra Nevada have substantially different species of plants and animals, because the east lies in the rain shadow of the crest. The plants and animals in the east are thus adapted to much drier conditions.

The altitudes listed for the biotic zones are for the central Sierra Nevada. The climate across the north–south axis of the range varies somewhat: the boundary elevations of the biotic zones move by as much as 1,000 ft (300 m) from the north end to the south end of the range.

== Western biotic zones ==
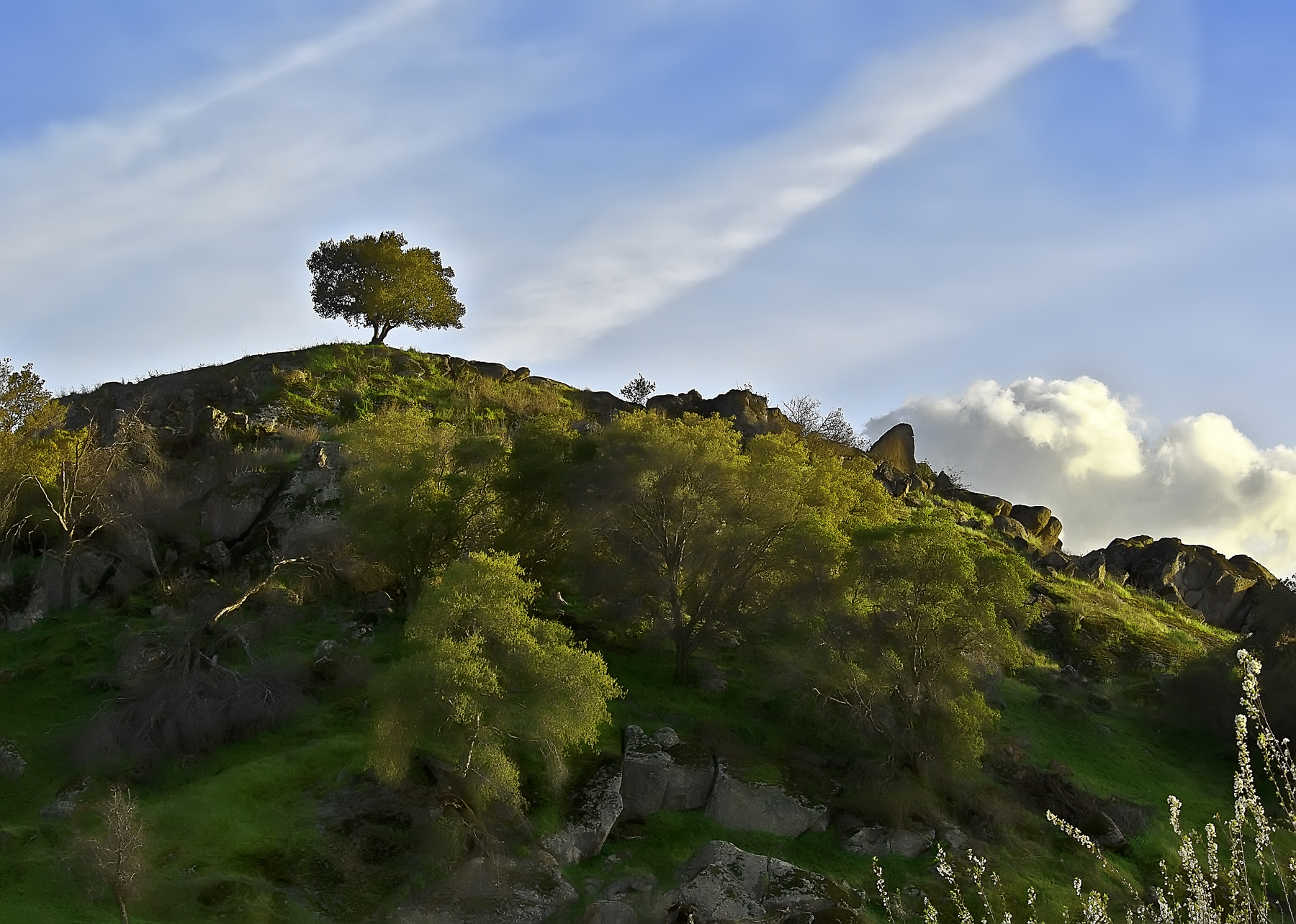
Forest in the foothills of the Sierra Nevada

=== Foothill Woodland and Chaparral Zone ===
The lowest-elevation biotic zone in the Sierra Nevada is found along the boundary with the Central Valley. This zone, stretching in elevation from 500 to 3,500 feet (150 to 1,070 m), is the foothill woodland zone, an area that is hot and dry in the summer with very little or no snow in the winter. The foothills are vegetated with grasslands of mostly non-native grasses, mixed grasslands and woodlands savanna, a foothill woodland community of blue oak and gray pine, and chaparral. Many of the plant communities are similar to those found on the inner California Coast Ranges. Animals typical of this zone include black bear, ringtail cat, coyote, gray squirrel, bobcat, California mule deer, and skunk. In the foothills of the northern portion of the Sierra Nevada, toyon and chamise often co-dominate certain open serpentine chaparral communities.

=== Lower Montane Forest ===
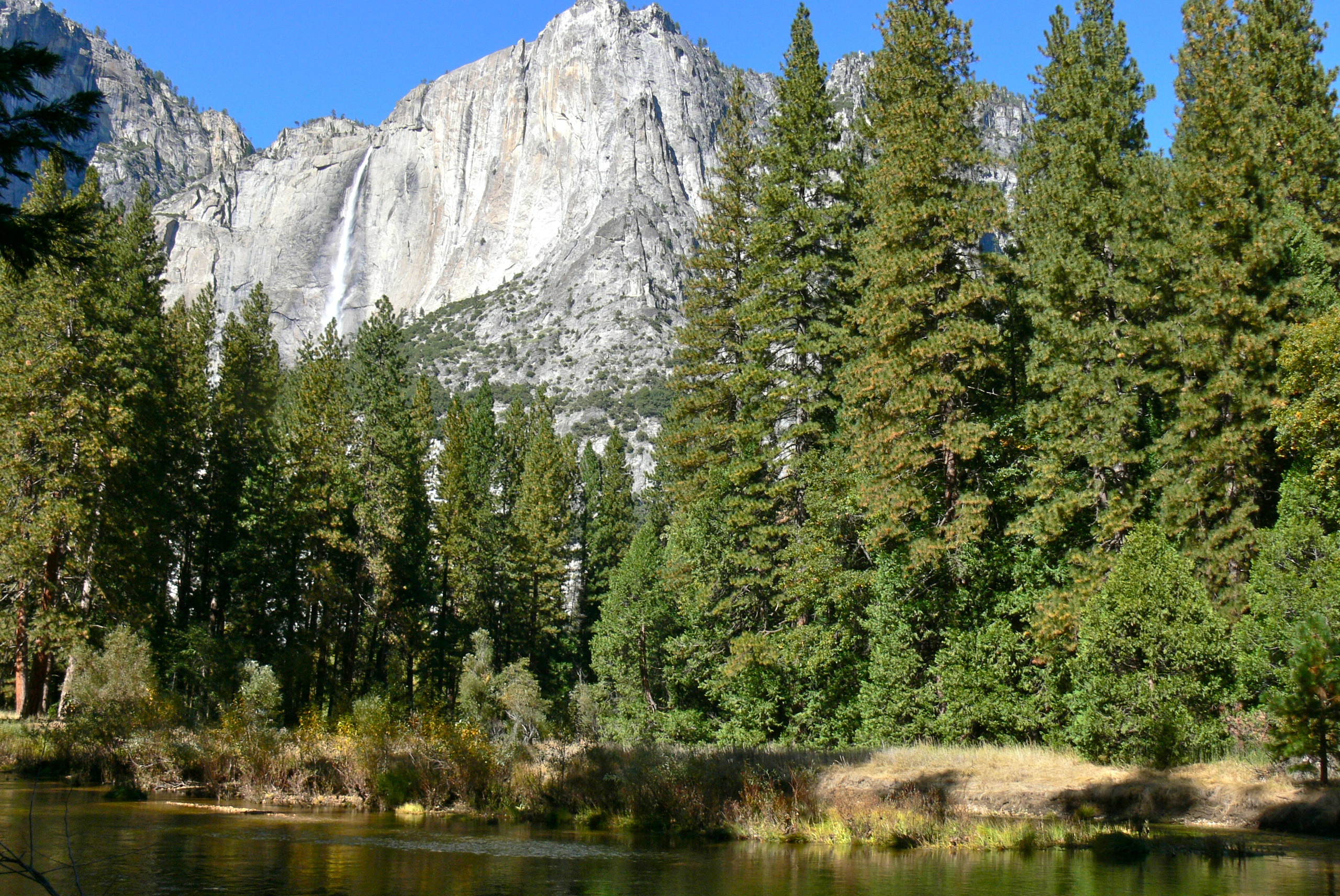
Yosemite Valley is in the Lower Montane Forest.

Beginning near the 3,000 ft (900 m) elevation, the hot, dry summers and cool, moist winters of the Mediterranean climate give rise to the lower montane forest zone. This zone is also known as the yellow pine forest zone. The accumulation of several feet of snow during the winter is not uncommon and can stay on the ground for several months. The diversity of tree species found in this zone make this a beautiful and interesting forest to explore. The indicator species for the lower montane forest are the ponderosa pine and the Jeffrey pine: the ponderosa pine generally occurs on the west side of the Sierra, while the Jeffrey pine occurs on the east. The lower montane forests also include trees such as California black oak, sugar pine, incense-cedar, and white fir. Animals that may be found in this zone include the dark-eyed junco, mountain chickadee, western gray squirrel, mule deer, and American black bear. The endangered Yosemite toad is found in montane forests of the central Sierra Nevada, at elevations of 4,790 to 11,910 ft (1,460 to 3,630 m).

The character of the Lower Montane Forest changes with latitude. North of Grass Valley, the lower montane forest ranges from 2,000 to 4,000 ft (600 to 1,200 m), with less ponderosa pine and more Douglas-fir. In the middle Sierra, south to the Merced River, the lower montane forest has the same elevation, but precipitation decreases and the forest mixes with chaparral. In the southern Sierra, the lower montane forest occurs between 3,000 to 5,000 ft (900 to 1,500 m), but can range as high as 6,000 ft (1,800 m), with ponderosa pine dominating the landscape. Unlike further north, the geology of the southern lower montane forest is dominated by granite.

=== Mid-Montane Forest ===
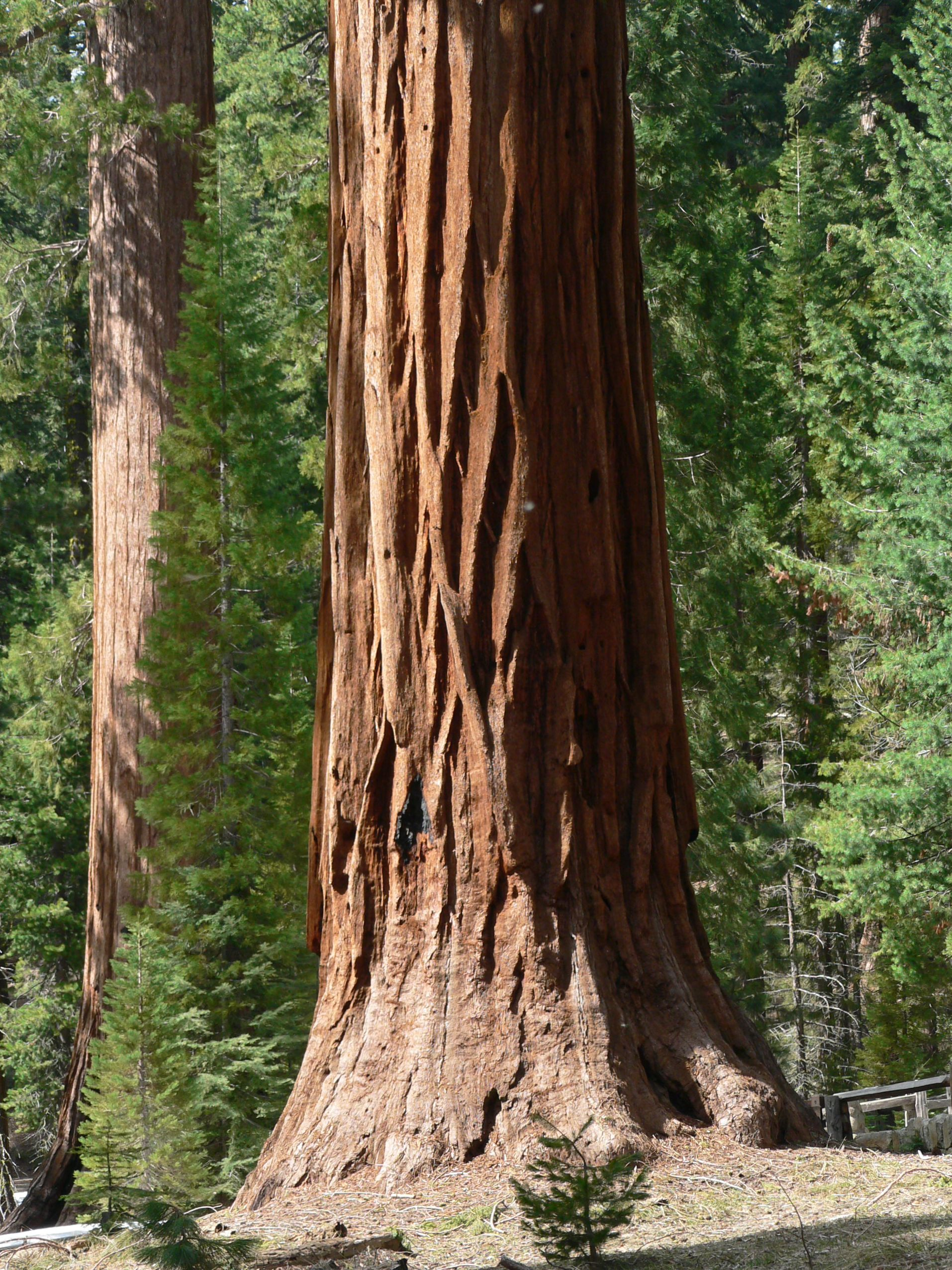
Giant sequoia tree, Mariposa Grove, Yosemite National Park

The mid-montane forest grows on the western slopes of the Sierra Nevada at moderate elevations. North of Lake Tahoe, the mid-montane forest occurs from 3,000 to 6,000 feet (900 to 1,800 m). Between Tahoe and Yosemite, the forest ranges from 4,000 to 6,000 ft (1,200 to 1,800 m), while south of Yosemite, it occurs between 5,000 to 7,000 ft (1,500 to 2,100 m). The mid-montane zone has a mixed forest of white fir, coast Douglas-fir, ponderosa pine, Jeffrey pine, live oak, black oak, and tanoak, depending on location.

North of Tahoe, the mid-montane forest has more white fir and Douglas-fir, and less ponderosa pine than further south. Jeffrey pine occurs on ultramafic lava soils. In Yosemite and points south, giant sequoia occurs in wetter locations.

=== Upper Montane Forest ===
The upper montane forest begins at higher elevations near 7,000 ft (2,100 m), where the montane climate is characterized by short, moist, cool summers and cold, wet winters. Snow begins to fall in November and may accumulate to depths up to 6 ft (1.8 m) and remain until June. Pure stands of red fir and lodgepole pine (the indicator species) are typical of this forest. Jeffrey pine, which has bark that smells like vanilla, and the picturesque western juniper can also be found in this zone. Wildflowers bloom in meadows from June through August. Common animals in this zone include the hermit thrush, sooty grouse (Dendragapus fuliginosus), great grey owl, golden-mantled ground squirrel, and (more rarely) the marten. Upper montane forests may be viewed from the Tioga Pass Road east of Crane Flat, Glacier Point Road, and State Route 108.

The elevation of the upper montane zone shifts with latitude: it occurs from 6,000 to 8,000 feet (1,800 to 2,400 m) north of Yosemite, and 7,000 to 9,000 ft (2,100 to 2,700 m) to the south.

=== Subalpine Forest ===
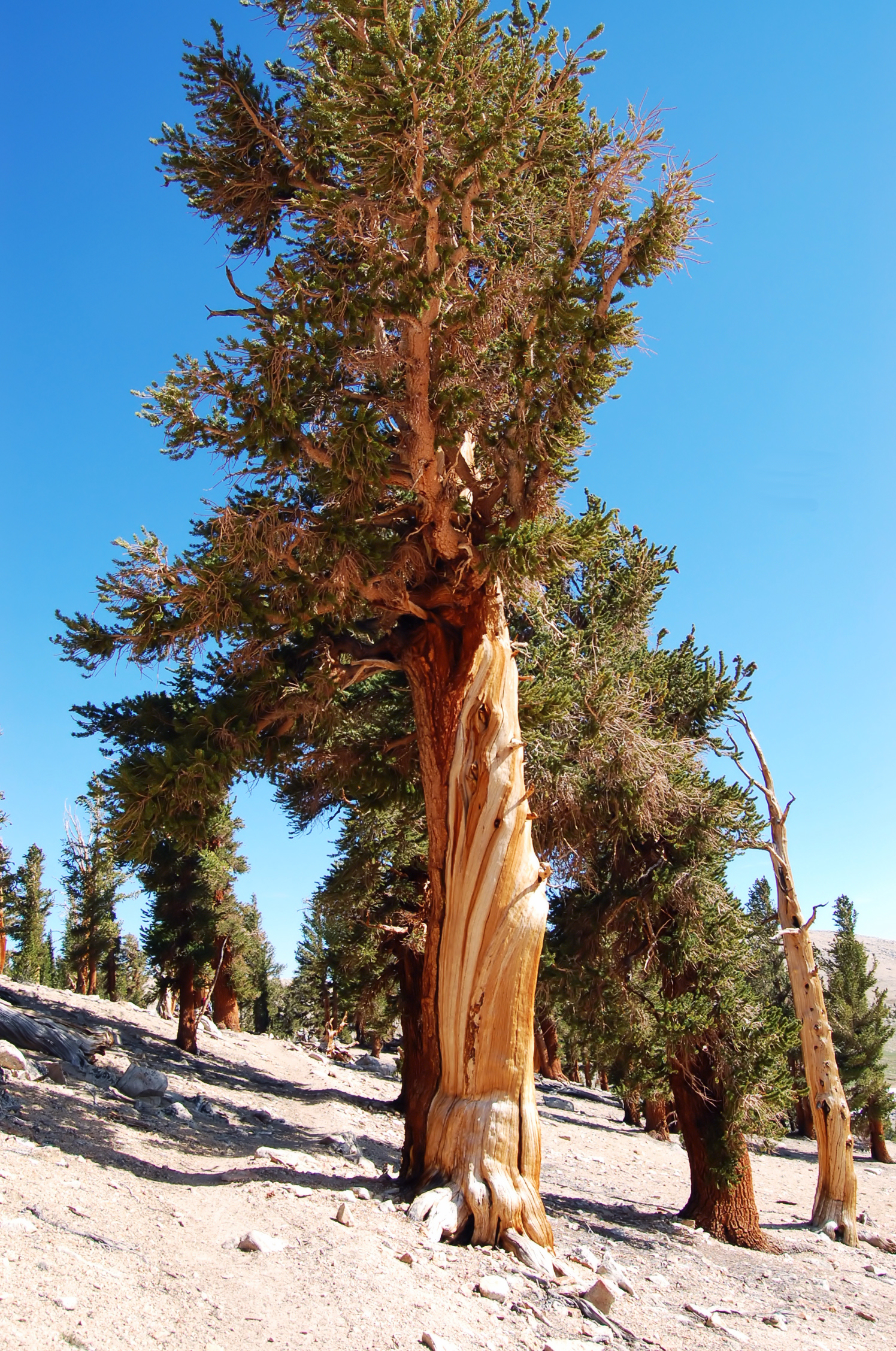
A foxtail pine in an open subalpine forest

The upper montane forest is replaced by the subalpine forest near 9,000 ft (2,700 m), where the climate is cooler with an even shorter growing season due to long, cold, and snowy winters. Accumulations of 3 to 9 ft (1 to 2.5 m) of snow are typical. The most common tree in the subalpine forest is the whitebark pine. The western white pine, mountain hemlock, and lodgepole pine are also found in this forest with many subalpine meadows that flower from July through August. Many species live in, or are transient in, this zone, including Clark's nutcracker. The vegetation and ecology is determined by the harsh climate, with extensive snow and wind. In addition, soils are thin and nutrient-poor. Due to these harsh conditions, vegetation grows slowly and at low temperatures. In addition, the stressful environment suppress species competition and promotes mutualism. The marginal conditions make the Sierra Nevada subalpine zone sensitive to environmental changes, such as climate change and pollution.

South of Bridgeport, the subalpine forest ranges from 9,000 to 11,000 ft (2,700 to 3,400 m) of elevation and contains foxtail pines, while to the north, the subalpine forest ranges from 8,000 to 10,000 ft (2,400 to 3,000 m) and the foxtail pine is absent.

=== Alpine Zone ===
The alpine zone begins near 10,500 ft (3,200 m) elevation (in the southern Sierra) and near 9,000 ft (2,700 m) (in the north). This zone is easily distinguished as it is above the tree line. No trees grow in this zone due to the harsh climatic conditions. Short, cool summers with long, cold, and snowy winters are typical at these elevations. Many exposed granitic outcroppings, talus slopes, and boulder fields limit the amount of vegetation that grows here. The herbaceous plants need to flower and produce their seeds quickly during the short, frost-free period of summer. Flora includes cushion plants, grasses, willows, and sedges. The macrolichen flora in the Sierra Nevada alpine zone is not well developed as compared to neighboring alpine zones in the Rocky Mountains and mountains of the Pacific Northwest. Some animal species that are adapted to this zone include the American pika, Belding's ground squirrel, the yellow-bellied marmot, and the endangered Sierra Nevada bighorn sheep. This zone can be viewed up close by hiking or climbing into the high elevations of the Sierra.

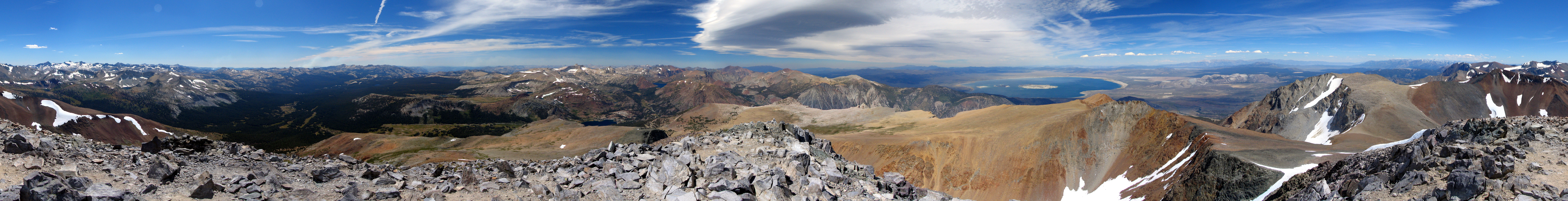
The summit of Mount Dana is in the alpine zone.

== Eastern biotic zones ==
The four highest eastern biotic zones are the same as the western zones, but at a higher elevation, due to less precipitation. The elevation of these zones in the Central Sierra are:

- Alpine zone: 11,500 feet (3,500 m) and above
- Subalpine forest: 10,500–11,500 feet (3,200–3,500 m)
- Upper montane forest: 9,000–10,500 feet (2,700–3,200 m)
- Lower montane forest: 7,000–9,000 feet (2,100–2,700 m) (heavily dominated by Jeffrey pines).

In the Owens Valley, the Foothill woodland zone is replaced by a Pinyon–juniper woodland zone, characterized by single-leaf pinyon pines and sierra junipers. The underbrush contains big sagebrush (Artemisia tridentata) and blackbrush (Coleogyne ramosissima). Jeffrey pines may occur along streams. Notable animals in this zone include the pinyon jay and the desert bighorn sheep. The Pinyon–Juniper woodland zone extends down to 5,000 ft (1,500 m) elevation.

Below 5,000 feet (1,500 m), there is not enough precipitation to support trees. The zones below this elevation are the Sagebrush Scrub Zone, Saltbush Scrub Zone, and the Alkali Sink Zone. These zones are distinguished by soil salinity.

== Threats ==
=== Exotic Plants in Yosemite National Park ===
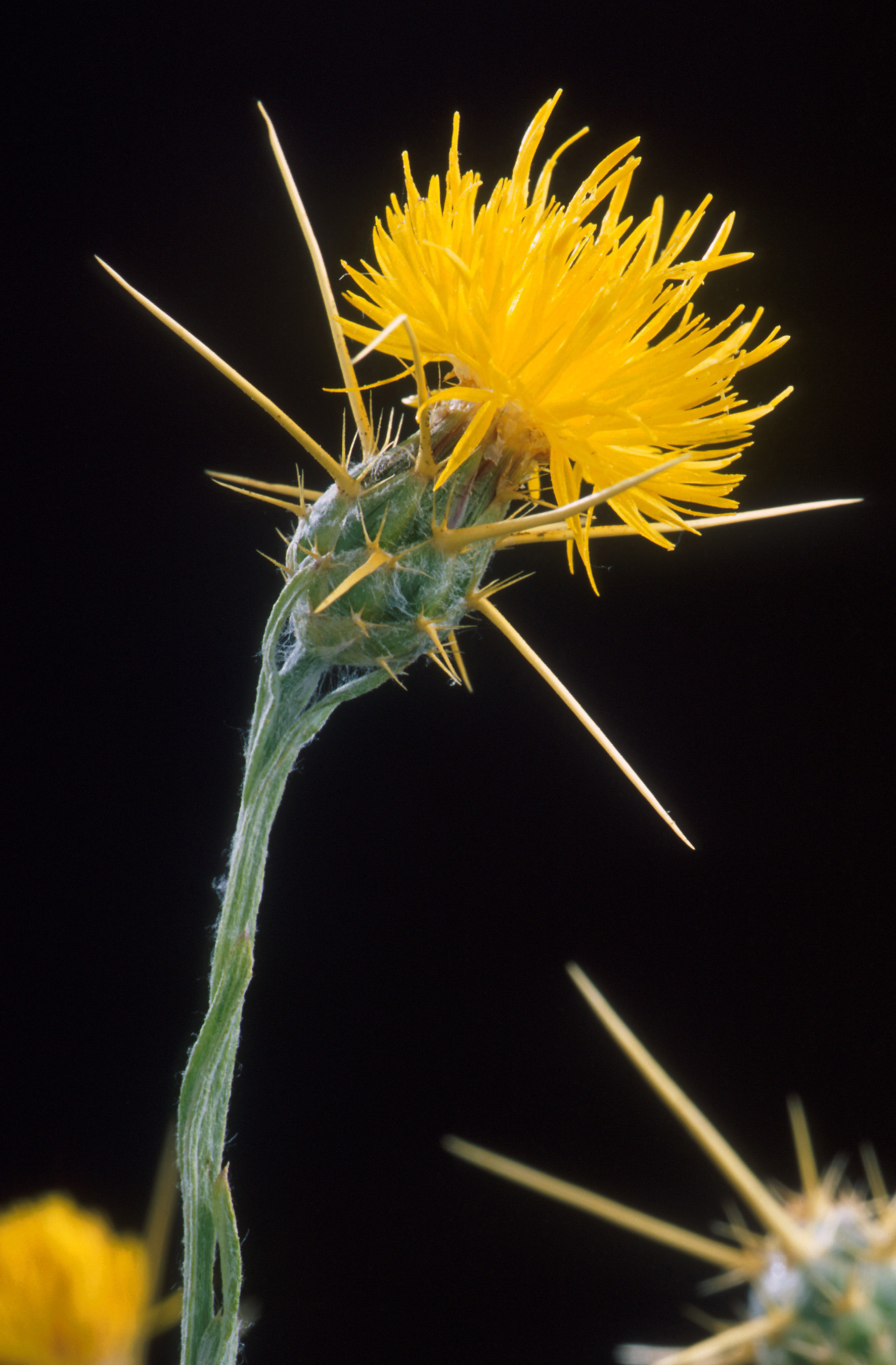
The yellow starthistle

Yosemite National Park has documented more than 130 non-native plant species within park boundaries. These non-native plants were introduced into Yosemite following the migration of early settlers in the late 1850s. Natural and human-caused disturbances, such as wildland fires and construction activities, have contributed to a rapid increase in the spread of non-native plants. A number of these species aggressively invade and displace the native plant communities, resulting in impacts on the park's resources. Non-native plants can bring about significant changes in park ecosystems by altering the native plant communities and the processes that support them. Some non-native species may cause an increase in the fire frequency of an area or increase the available nitrogen in the soil that may allow more non-native plants to become established. Many non-native species, such as yellow starthistle (Centaurea solstitialis), are able to produce a long tap root that allows them to out-compete the native plants for available water.

Bull thistle (Cirsium vulgare), common mullein (Verbascum thapsus), and Klamath weed (Hypericum perforatum) have been identified as noxious pests in Yosemite since the 1940s. Additional species that have been recognized more recently as aggressive and requiring control are yellow starthistle, sweet clovers (Melilotus spp.), Himalayan blackberry (Rubus discolor), cut-leaved blackberry (Rubus laciniatus) and periwinkle (Vinca major).

=== Lodgepole needle miner ===
The lodgepole needle miner (Coleotechnites milleri) is an insect, endemic to the upper Tuolumne and Merced River watersheds of Yosemite National Park and one small headwaters drainage of the San Joaquin River (Sierra National Forest). It lives mostly within the needles of lodgepole pine for two years, emerging as a little gray moth for a few weeks in July of odd-numbered years. This keeps any predators from becoming effective control agents and allows populations to escalate rapidly. While regular prehistoric outbreaks of lodgepole needle miners have been confirmed through dendrochronology, historic records document outbreaks from 1903 to 1921, 1933 to 1941, and 1947 to 1963.

Extensive stands of "ghost forest" and jackstraw trees are still conspicuous throughout Sierra Nevada. Annual monitoring of lodgepole needle miner density began in 1966, and 28 permanent plots are scattered north of the Cathedral Range. The current outbreak began in 1973 and has been sweeping around the south side of the Cathedral Range, arriving at Sunrise High Sierra Camp in 2001. The Ghost Forest which was evident at the crest between Tenaya Lake and Tuolumne Meadows in the late 1970s was noticeably reforested by 2000. Lodgepole needle miner defoliation currently extends over approximately 40,000 acres (160 km^{2}), with nearly 10,000 acres (40 km^{2}) of low to high mortality each year.

While lightning fires are frequent in lodgepole pine communities, they usually remain small, with estimated fire return intervals at Yosemite National Park that are long (relative to most other forest types). Thus, fire suppression activities are thought to have had little influence upon species composition, structure, fuels, and natural processes in lodgepole forests. Also, in comparison with Rocky Mountains lodgepole pine forests, fire plays a smaller role, and so the needle miner assumes greater importance in lodgepole pine forest population dynamics in the Sierra Nevada. However, Rocky Mountain lodgepole forest dynamics are also heavily influenced by insect outbreaks, primarily bark beetles.

== Special-status species ==
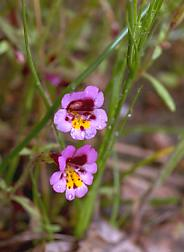
Slender-stemmed monkeyflower is one of a number of rare plants in the Sierra Nevada

There are at least 1,300 vascular plant species in the Sierra Nevada, along with numerous bryophytes and lichens. There are at least 450 species of vertebrate animals. A total of 135 plant species in the Sierra Nevada have status as Threatened, Endangered, or Sensitive

Plants that are Federal species of concern (former Category 2 species) under the Federal Endangered Species Act include:

Image	Scientific name
	Three-bracted onion (Allium tribracteatum)
	Yosemite woolly sunflower (Eriophyllum nubigenum)
	Congdon's lomatium (Lomatium congdonii),
	Tiehm's rock-cress (Boechera tiehmii),
	Slender-stemmed monkeyflower (Erythranthe filicaulis)
	Bolander's clover (Trifolium bolanderi).

Although Category 2 was abolished in 1996, species of concern refers to those species that might be declining or be in need of concentrated conservation actions to prevent decline. Therefore, these six species continue to be evaluated and managed by the National Park Service.

Four state-listed rare plant species are considered restricted and limited throughout all or a significant portion of their range, and may represent disjunct populations at the extreme end of their range:

1. Yosemite onion (Allium yosemitense),
2. Tompkin's sedge (Carex tompkinsii),
3. Congdon's woolly sunflower (Eriophyllum congdonii), and
4. Congdon's lewisia (Lewisia congdonii).

Endangered or threatened species of animals that occur in the Sierra Nevada include:

1. Sierra Nevada bighorn sheep (Ovis canadensis sierrae), endangered (2000)
2. California condor (Gymnogyps californianus), endangered (1967)
3. Southwestern willow flycatcher (Empidonax traillii extimus), endangered (1995)
4. Paiute cutthroat trout (Oncorhynchus clarki seleniris), threatened (1975)
5. Lahontan cutthroat trout (Oncorhynchus clarki henshawi), threatened (1975)
6. Owens Tui chub (Gila bicolor snyderi), endangered (1985)

== Wetlands ==
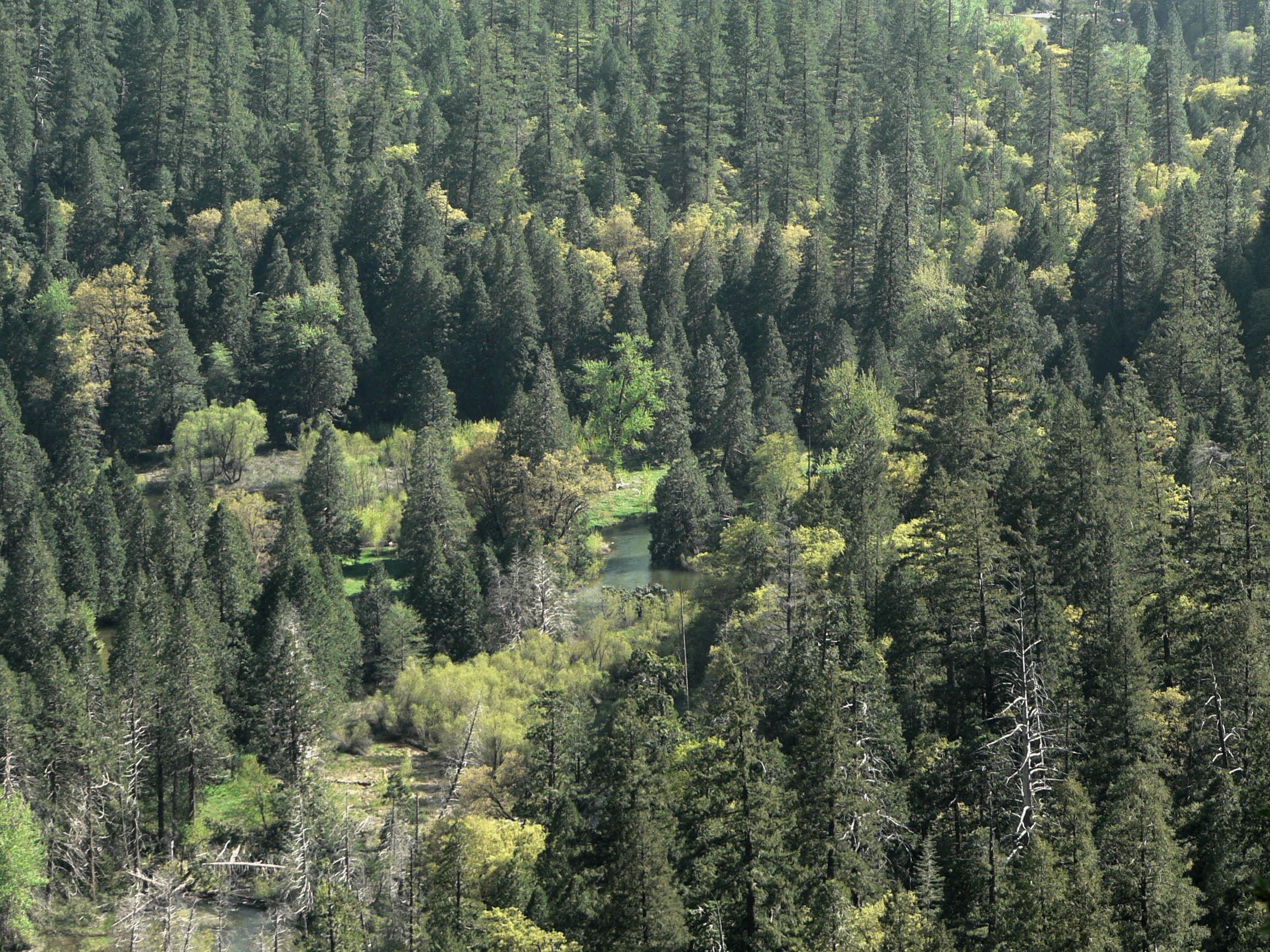
Riparian habitat (riverine wetland) alongside Tenaya Creek

Wetlands in the Sierra Nevada occur in valley bottoms throughout the range, and are often hydrologically linked to nearby lakes and rivers through seasonal flooding and groundwater movement. Meadow habitats, distributed at elevations from 3,000 to 11,000 feet (910 to 3,350 m), are generally wetlands, as are the riparian habitats found on the banks of numerous streams and rivers.

The Sierra contains three major types of wetland:

1. Riverine,
2. Lacustrine, and
3. Palustrine

Each of these types of wetlands varies in geographic distribution, duration of saturation, vegetation community, and overall ecosystem function. All three types of wetlands provide rich habitat for plant and animal species, delay and store seasonal floodwaters, minimize downstream erosion, and improve water quality.

Riverine wetlands are found within river and stream channels and are strongly influenced by seasonal runoff patterns. When inundated, riverine wetlands provide habitat for water-tolerant plants such as willows, and aquatic animals such as tadpoles and immature fish.

Lacustrine wetlands generally occur on river floodplains and along lakeshores and are influenced by seasonal variations in groundwater levels. These wetlands are rare in the mountain range, but support an abundance of warm-water loving plant and animal species.

Palustrine wetlands are typically distinguished from riverine and lacustrine systems by the presence of very dense covers of trees, shrubs, or emergent plants. This wetland type includes wet meadows, densely vegetated riparian habitats, and shallow ponds. They provide cover and forage for wildlife traveling between upland and aquatic habitats.

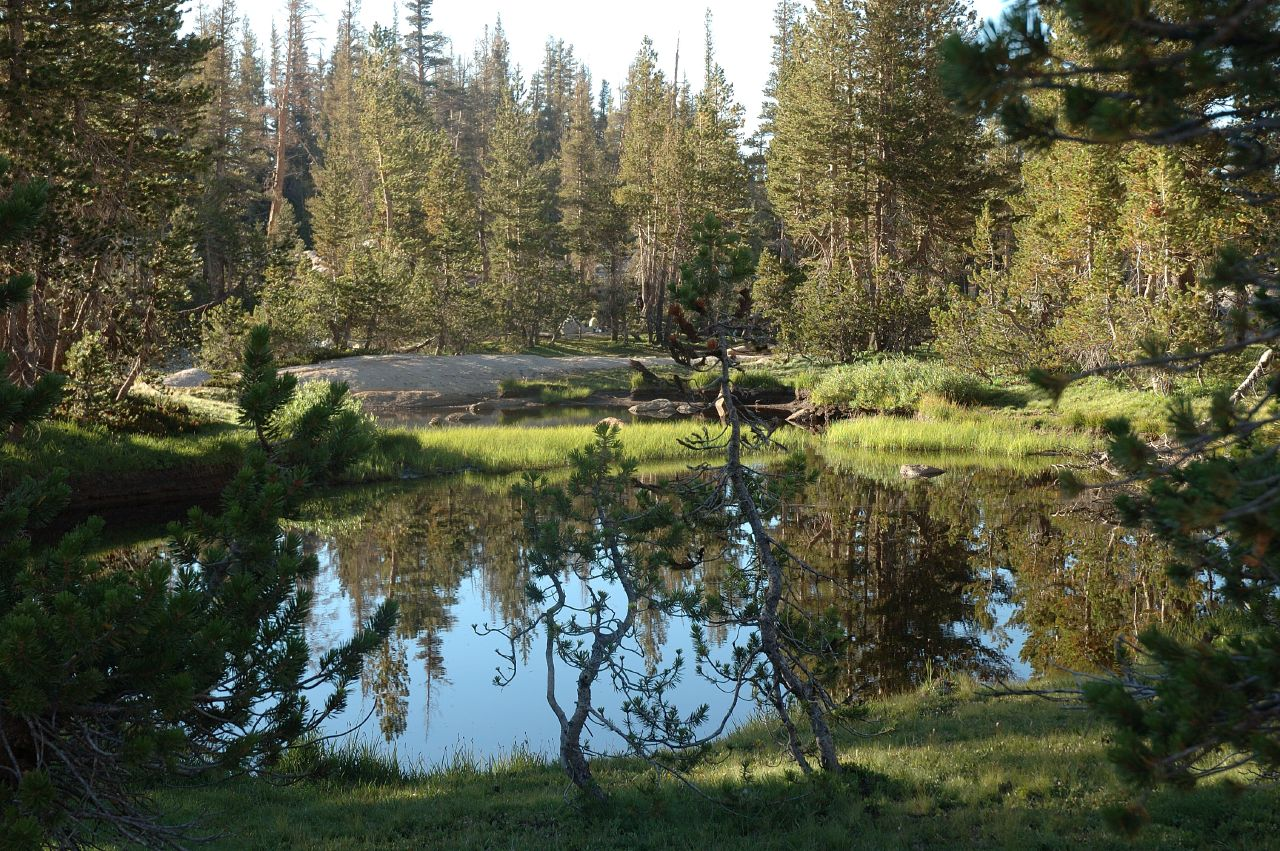
Palustrine wetland in Yosemite National Park

Since the 1970s the United States has made substantial progress toward protecting and restoring wetland habitats. All federal land in the Sierra Nevada complies with a 1990 Presidential Executive Order that mandates 'no net loss' of wetlands, and requires federal agencies to map and protect all existing wetlands.

In 1996 the U.S. Fish and Wildlife Service delineated and classified some of the wetlands of the Sierra Nevada, including all of Yosemite National Park. This was performed through an analysis of aerial photographs and topographic maps, as a part of the National Wetlands Inventory Web Site (NWI). The NWI maps have not been rigorously ground-truthed and only delineate wetlands larger than 5 acres (2 ha) in size.

The National Park Service restores to natural conditions wetlands that have been drained or filled in the past. Most recently in Yosemite Valley, the Cook's Meadow restoration project involved filling old drainage ditches that were draining the meadow and removing an old roadbed that was inhibiting water flow. These actions are currently being monitored with vegetation transects and mapping of surface water to determine how successful the project was in restoring the wetland.
