= Foothill fleabane =

Foothill fleabane is a common name for several plants and may refer to:

- Erigeron consimilis, native to the western United States
- Erigeron mariposanus, endemic to California
