= Wild Rose =

Wild Rose may refer to:

== Common name of flowering shrubs ==
- Any wild members of the genus Rosa, especially:
  - Rosa acicularis, "wild rose", a rose species which occurs in Asia, Europe, and North America
  - Rosa arkansana, "wild prairie rose", a rose species native to a large area of central North America
  - Rosa californica, "California wildrose", native to the U.S. states of California and Oregon and the northern part of Baja California, Mexico
  - Rosa canina, "wild rose" or "dog rose", a climbing rose species native to Europe, northwest Africa and western Asia
  - Rosa virginiana, "Virginia rose", a rose species native to North America
  - Rosa woodsii, "wild rose" of the sagebrush steppe in the Great Basin of North America
- Diplolaena grandiflora, an Australian flowering shrub

== Arts and entertainment ==
=== Film and television ===
- Wildrose (film), a 1984 American drama
- Wild Rose (1939 film), a Hungarian comedy
- Wild Rose (2018 film), a British musical drama
  - Wild Rose (soundtrack)
  - Wild Rose (musical), based on the 2018 film
- Wild Roses (film), a 2017 Polish thriller drama
- Wild Roses (TV series), a 2009 Canadian TV show

=== Music ===
- Wild Rose (band), an American country music band
- "Wild Rose", a 2005 song by the Bombay Rockers
- "Wild Roses", a song by Of Monsters and Men from the 2019 album Fever Dream

=== Other uses in arts and entertainment ===
- Wild Rose, a 2005 novel by Deb Caletti
- Wild Roses, an 1890 painting by Vincent van Gogh

== Businesses and organisations ==
- Wild Rose Brewery, in Calgary, Alberta, Canada
- Wildrose Party, a political party in Alberta, Canada
- Wildrose Party of Alberta, forerunner of the Wildrose Party
- Wildrose Independence Party of Alberta, Canada
- Wildrose Loyalty Coalition, split from the Wildrose Independence Party

== Places ==
=== Canada ===
- Alberta, Canada, nicknamed "Wild Rose Country"
- Wild Rose, Edmonton, Alberta
  - Wild Rose (electoral district)
- Wild Rose, Saskatchewan

=== United States ===
- Wildrose, North Dakota
- Wild Rose, Wisconsin
- Wild Rose, Richland County, Wisconsin
- Wildrose Peak, a mountain in California

== Ships ==
- USS Wilrose II, a United States Navy patrol vessel 1918–1919, sometimes USS Wild Rose
- The Wild Rose (disambiguation)
- Wild Irish Rose, an alcoholic beverage
