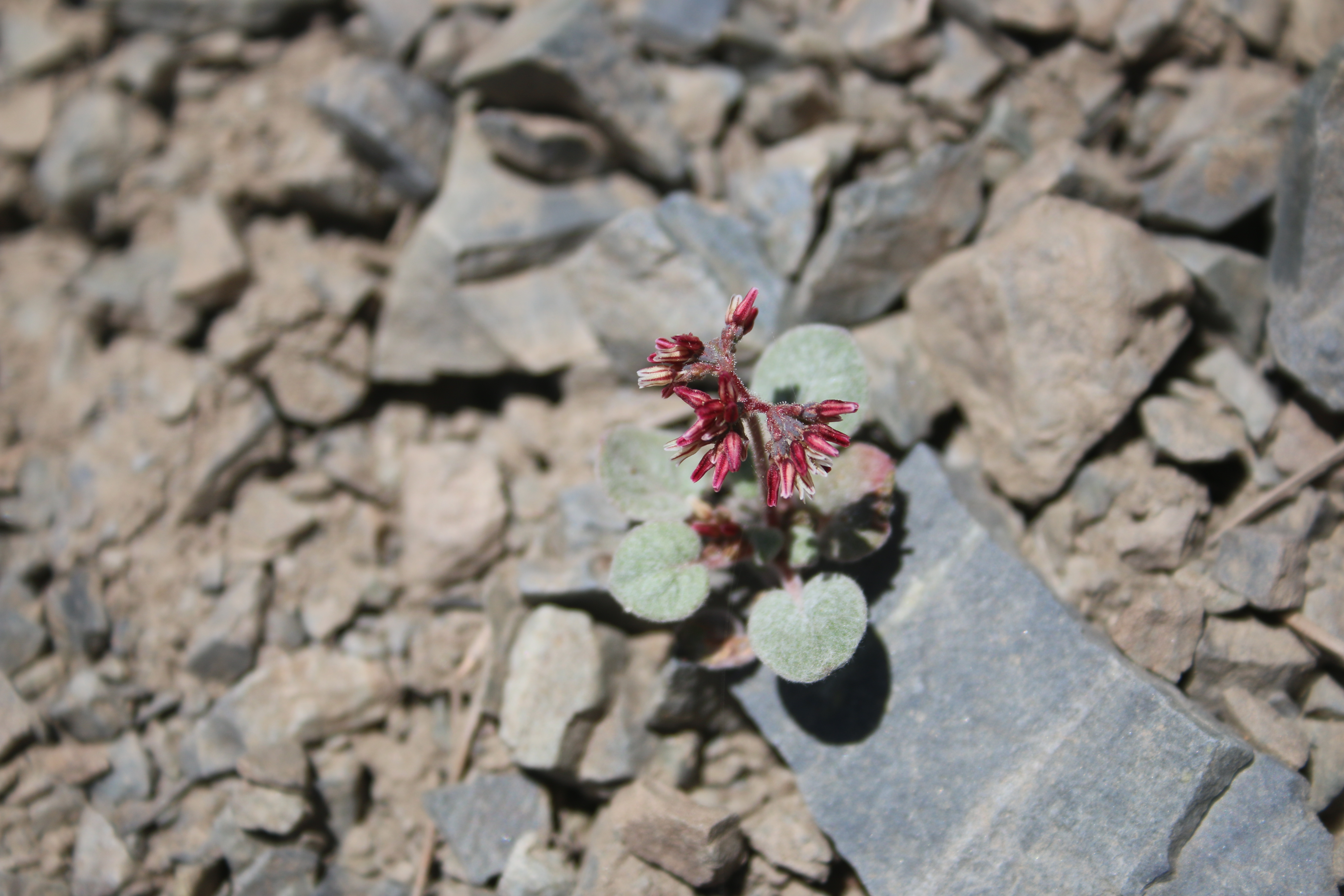

Conservation status
- Critically Imperiled (NatureServe)

Scientific classification
- Kingdom: Plantae
- Clade: Tracheophytes
- Clade: Angiosperms
- Clade: Eudicots
- Order: Caryophyllales
- Family: Polygonaceae
- Genus: Eriogonum
- Species: E. eremicola

Binomial name
- Eriogonum eremicola J.T.Howell & Reveal

= Eriogonum eremicola =

Species of wild buckwheat

Eriogonum eremicola is a rare species of wild buckwheat known by the common names Telescope Peak buckwheat and Wild Rose Canyon buckwheat. It is endemic to Inyo County, California, where it is known from only a few occurrences in the Inyo Mountains and Telescope Peak in Death Valley. It grows in sandy to rocky habitat in the forests and woodlands of these desert mountains. It is an annual herb producing a spreading, glandular, reddish green stem up to about 25 centimeters tall. The rounded, woolly leaves are up to about 2.5 centimeters long and are located at the base of the stem. The scattered inflorescences are small clusters of tiny flowers which are white with reddish stripes, aging to solid red, or sometimes yellow. The plant is under protection in Death Valley National Park.
