= Wildrose Peak =

Mountain in California, United States

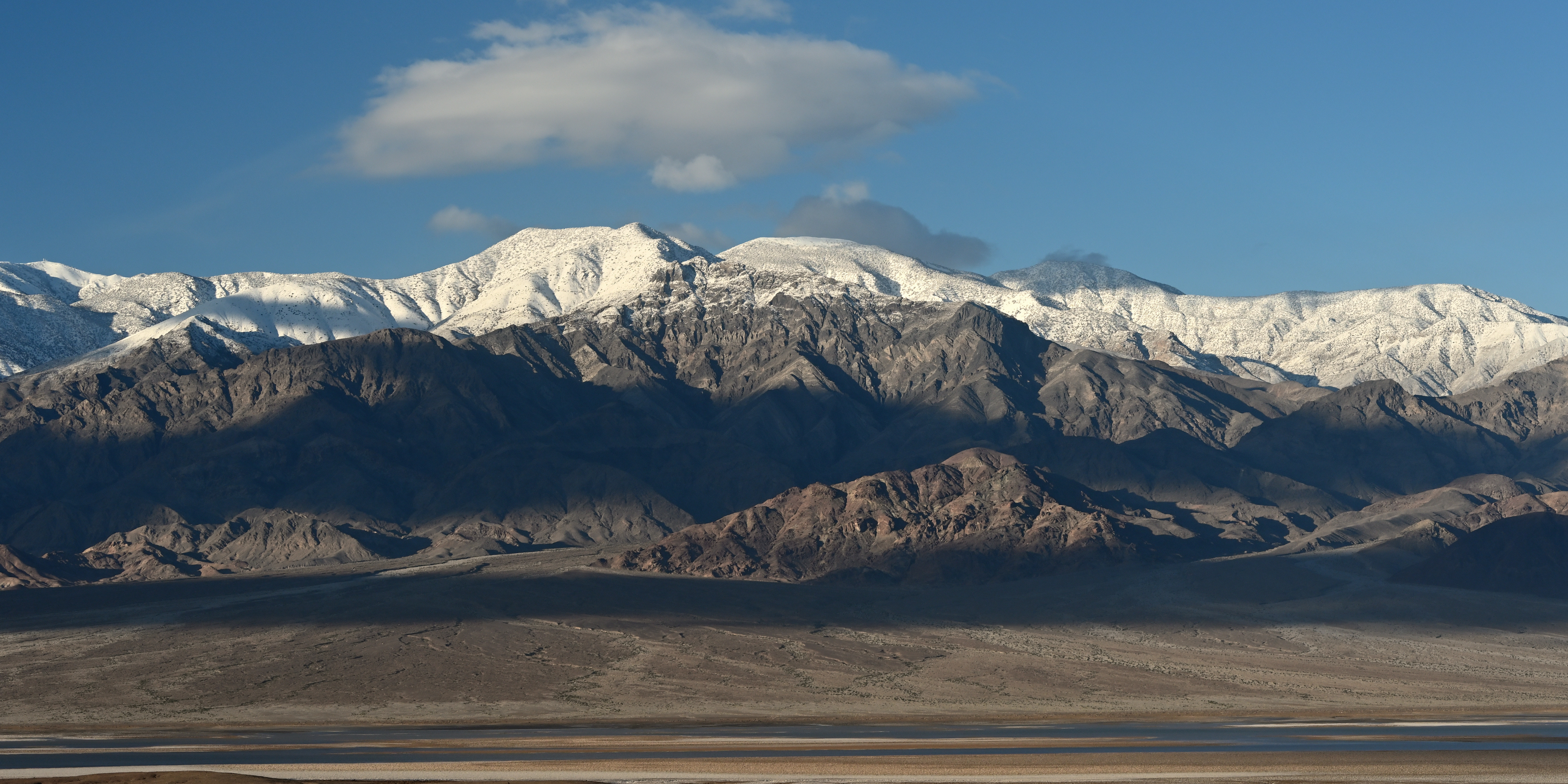
- East-northeast aspect

Highest point
- Elevation: 9,064 ft (2,763 m)
- Prominence: 1,344 ft (410 m)
- Parent peak: Rogers Peak
- Isolation: 3.99 mi (6.42 km)
- Coordinates: 36°16′32″N 117°04′45″W

Geography
- Location within California Location within the United States
- Country: United States
- State: California
- County: Inyo
- Protected area: Death Valley National Park
- Parent range: Panamint Range
- Topo map: USGS Wildrose Peak

Geology
- Rock age: Precambrian-Cambrian
- Mountain type: Fault block
- Rock type: Sedimentary rock

Climbing
- Easiest route: class 1 trail

Wildrose Peak is a 9,064-foot-elevation (2,763-meter) summit in Inyo County, California, United States.

== Description ==
Wildrose Peak is the eighth-highest mountain of the Panamint Range, and it is set within Death Valley National Park and the Mojave Desert. Precipitation runoff from this mountain's north slope drains to Death Valley via Trail Canyon, whereas the south slope drains to Panamint Valley via Wildrose Canyon. Topographic relief is significant as the summit rises 9,300 feet (2,835 meters) above Badwater Basin in 10 miles (16 km). The mountain is composed of Precambrian-Cambrian limestone, a marine sedimentary rock. Hiking to the summit is via the 8.4-mile (round-trip) Wildrose Peak Trail which starts at the Wildrose Charcoal Kilns and gains 2,200 feet of elevation. The first mile of the trail climbs through pinyon–juniper woodland, and many hikers choose Wildrose Peak over Telescope Peak, daunted by the additional elevation gain and mileage of Telescope. The summit offers a stunning 360-degree panorama of Death Valley and the eastern Sierra Nevada mountain range including the lowest and highest points in the contiguous United States: Badwater Basin and Mount Whitney. This mountain's toponym has been officially adopted by the United States Board on Geographic Names.

== Climate ==
According to the Köppen climate classification system, Wildrose Peak has a cold desert climate, with the lower valleys in a hot desert climate zone. Temperatures average between 0 °F to 30 °F in January, and 50 °F to 100 °F in July. Typical of high deserts, summer temperatures can be exceedingly hot, while winter temperatures can be very cold. Snowfall is common, but the snow melts rapidly in the arid and sunny climate. Rainfall is very low, and the evaporation rate classifies the area as desert.

== See also ==
- Geology of the Death Valley area
- Mountains of Death Valley National Park

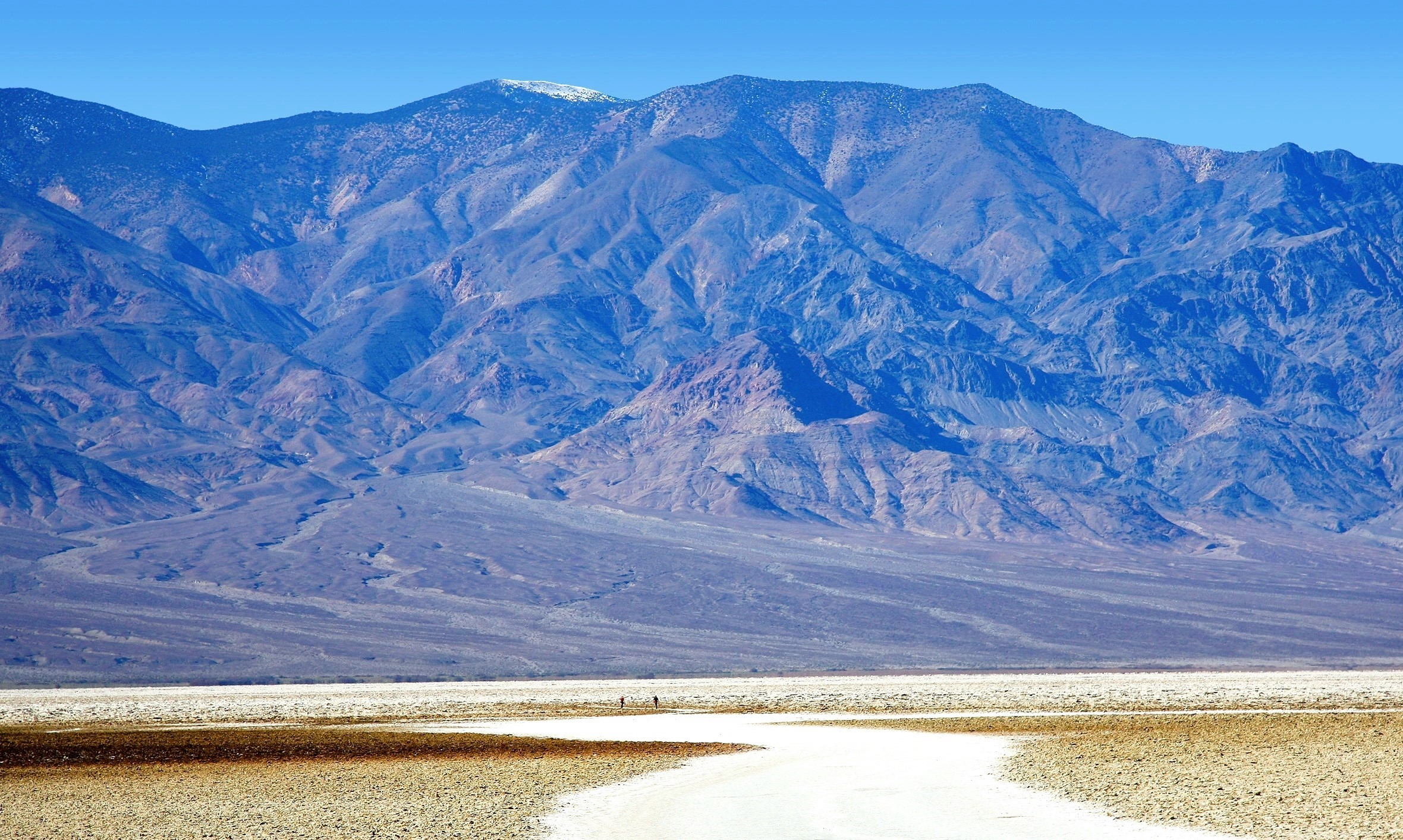
East aspect of Wildrose Peak (snow on summit) viewed from Badwater Basin.
