= Eriophyllum congdonii =

Conservation status
- Imperiled (NatureServe)

Scientific classification
- Kingdom: Plantae
- Clade: Tracheophytes
- Clade: Angiosperms
- Clade: Eudicots
- Clade: Asterids
- Order: Asterales
- Family: Asteraceae
- Genus: Eriophyllum
- Species: E. congdonii

Binomial name
- Eriophyllum congdonii Brandeg.

Species of flowering plant

Eriophyllum congdonii, known by the common name Congdon's woolly sunflower, is a rare California species of flowering plant in the family Asteraceae.

== Distribution ==
Eriophyllum congdonii is native to the mountains of central Mariposa County, California, where it grows along the valley of the Merced River as it flows through Yosemite National Park. One additional population has been reported on the east flank of Telescope Peak in Inyo County.

== Description ==
Eriophyllum congdonii is an annual herb growing mostly erect with branching stems up to 30 centimeters (1 foot) long. The woolly, whitish leaves are 1 to 4 centimeters (0.4-1.6 inches) long and may have a few shallow lobes.

The inflorescence consists of one flower head containing many glandular yellow disc florets surrounded by 8 to 10 yellow ray florets each 3 to 5 millimeters (0.12-0.20 inches) long.

The fruit is a rough-haired achene with a tiny, scaly pappus.

== See also ==
- Joseph Whipple Congdon
