= Erigeron mariposanus =

Conservation status
- Presumed Extinct (NatureServe)

Scientific classification
- Kingdom: Plantae
- Clade: Tracheophytes
- Clade: Angiosperms
- Clade: Eudicots
- Clade: Asterids
- Order: Asterales
- Family: Asteraceae
- Genus: Erigeron
- Species: E. mariposanus

Binomial name
- Erigeron mariposanus Congdon

Species of flowering plant

Erigeron mariposanus is a rare species of flowering plant in the family Asteraceae known by the common names foothill fleabane, Mariposa daisy, or Mariposa erigeron. It has been found only in a few locations in Mariposa County in California. Some sources say that it is now probably extinct.

Erigeron mariposanus is a perennial herb up to 28 centimeters (11 inches) tall, producing a woody taproot. The leaves and the stem are covered with hairs. The plant generally produces 1-4 flower heads per stem, each head with up to 22 blue ray florets surrounding numerous yellow disc florets.
