= List of national parks of the United States by elevation =

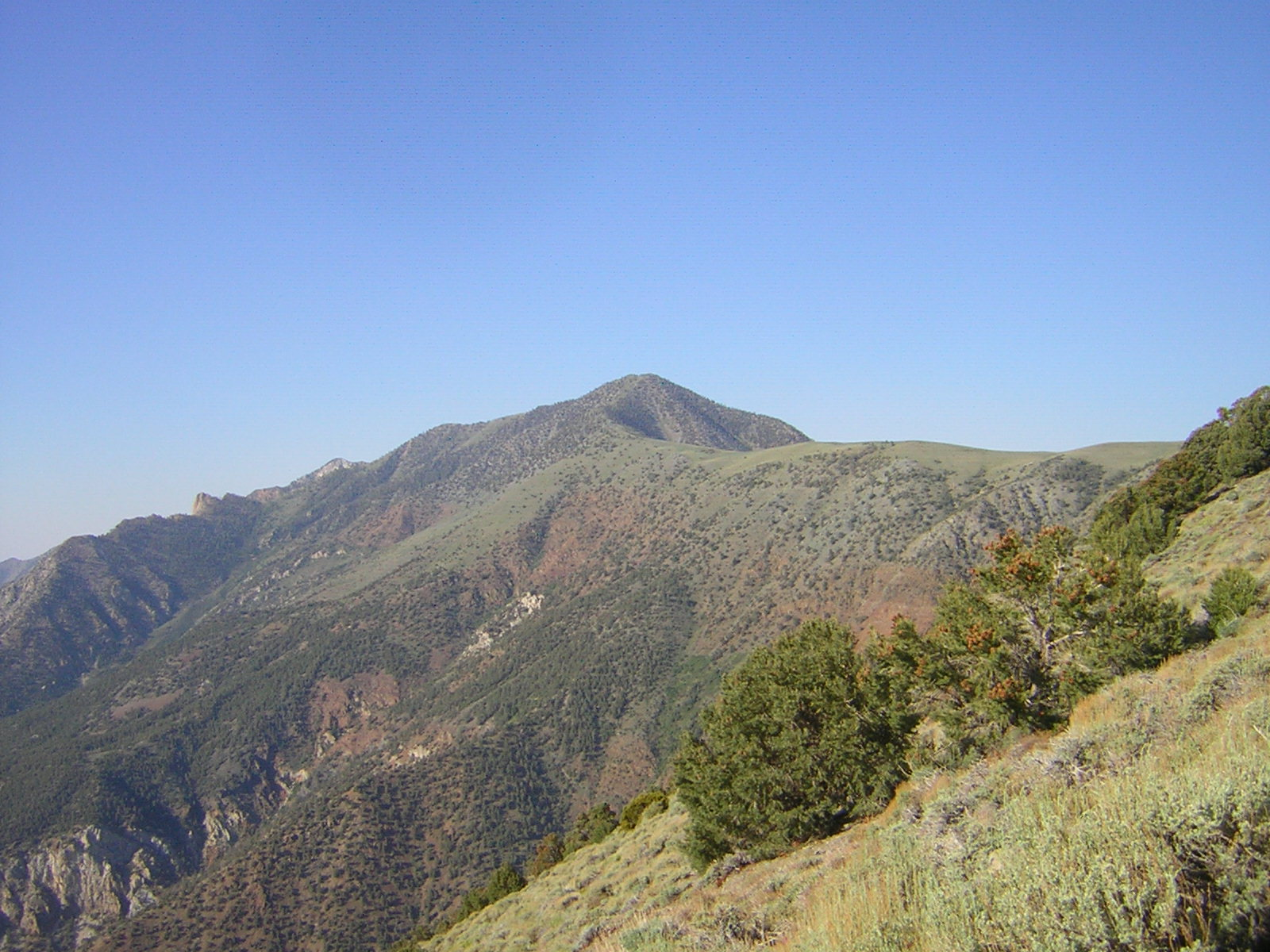
Death Valley National Park, notorious for its below sea level desert, also has soaring mountains, including Telescope Peak, its highest.

This is a list of United States National Parks by elevation. Most of America's national parks are located in mountainous areas. Even among those located close to the ocean, not all are flat. Those few that are low-lying preserve important natural habitats that could never exist at high altitudes. Several national parks protect deep canyons with great vertical relief. There are also three national parks whose primary features are caves, the depths of which are still being explored.

== Highest and lowest points in each US National Park ==
Criteria: Points on this list are the highest and lowest points within each national park and its associated national preserve, if it has one. It does not include adjacent or associated national recreation areas, parkways, memorials, or forests, but does include private property within park boundaries. Footnotes are given to mention other notable high or low points, when appropriate.

Rank	Park	Location	Peak name	Mountain range	Elevation	Location of lowest point	Minimum elevation	Vertical relief
1	Denali	Alaska	Denali	Alaska Range	20,310 feet (6,190 m)	Yentna River	240 feet (73 m)	20,070 feet (6,120 m)
2	Wrangell-St. Elias	Alaska	Mount Saint Elias	Saint Elias Mountains	18,008 feet (5,489 m)	Gulf of Alaska	0 feet (0 m)	18,008 feet (5,489 m)
3	Glacier Bay	Alaska	Mount Fairweather	Saint Elias Mountains	15,300 feet (4,700 m)	Gulf of Alaska	0 feet (0 m)	15,300 feet (4,700 m)
4	Sequoia	California	Mount Whitney	Sierra Nevada	14,505 feet (4,421 m)	Kaweah River	1,360 feet (410 m)	13,145 feet (4,007 m)
5	Mount Rainier	Washington (state)	Mount Rainier	Cascade Range	14,411 feet (4,392 m)	Ohanapecosh River	1,610 feet (490 m)	12,801 feet (3,902 m)
6	Rocky Mountain	Colorado	Longs Peak	Front Range	14,259 feet (4,346 m)	Big Thompson River	7,630 feet (2,330 m)	6,629 feet (2,021 m)
7	Kings Canyon	California	North Palisade	Sierra Nevada	14,242 feet (4,341 m)	Kaweah River (North Fork)	3,480 feet (1,060 m)	10,762 feet (3,280 m)
8	Grand Teton	Wyoming	Grand Teton	Teton Range	13,770 feet (4,200 m)	Fish Creek	6,310 feet (1,920 m)	7,460 feet (2,270 m)
9	Hawaii Volcanoes		Mauna Loa	Hawaiian Islands	13,679 feet (4,169 m)	Pacific Ocean	0 feet (0 m)	13,679 feet (4,169 m)
10	Great Sand Dunes	Colorado	Tijeras Peak	Sangre de Cristo Range	13,610 feet (4,150 m)	near San Luis Lakes	7,520 feet (2,290 m)	6,090 feet (1,860 m)
11	Yosemite	California	Mount Lyell	Sierra Nevada	13,114 feet (3,997 m)	Merced River	2,105 feet (642 m)	11,009 feet (3,356 m)
12	Great Basin	Nevada	Wheeler Peak	Snake Range	13,065 feet (3,982 m)	Snake Creek	6,195 feet (1,888 m)	6,870 feet (2,090 m)
13	Yellowstone	Wyoming Montana Idaho	Eagle Peak	Absaroka Range	11,358 feet (3,462 m)	Reese Creek	5,282 feet (1,610 m)	6,076 feet (1,852 m)
14	Death Valley	California Nevada	Telescope Peak	Panamint Range	11,049 feet (3,368 m)	Badwater	−282 feet (−86 m)	11,328 feet (3,453 m)
15	Glacier	Montana	Mount Cleveland	Lewis Range	10,466 feet (3,190 m)	Flathead River	3,150 feet (960 m)	7,316 feet (2,230 m)
16	Lassen Volcanic	California	Lassen Peak	Cascade Range	10,457 feet (3,187 m)	Hot Springs Creek	5,275 feet (1,608 m)	5,182 feet (1,579 m)
17	Lake Clark	Alaska	Redoubt Volcano	Aleutian Range	10,197 feet (3,108 m)	Cook Inlet	0 feet (0 m)	10,197 feet (3,108 m)
18	Haleakala	Hawaii	Haleakala	Hawaiian Islands	10,023 feet (3,055 m)	Pacific Ocean	0 feet (0 m)	10,023 feet (3,055 m)
19	North Cascades	Washington (state)	Goode Mountain	Cascade Range	9,206 feet (2,806 m)	Goodell Creek	605 feet (184 m)	8,601 feet (2,622 m)
20	Grand Canyon	Arizona	Lookout tower near the North Rim's main entrance	Kaibab Plateau	9,165 feet (2,793 m)	Lake Mead	1,173 feet (358 m)	7,992 feet (2,436 m)
21	Bryce Canyon	Utah	Rainbow Point	Paunsaugunt Plateau	9,115 feet (2,778 m)	Yellow Creek	6,565 feet (2,001 m)	2,550 feet (780 m)
22	Black Canyon of the Gunnison	Colorado	Poison Spring Hill	Grand Mesa	9,040 feet (2,760 m)	Gunnison River	5,440 feet (1,660 m)	3,600 feet (1,100 m)
23	Capitol Reef	Utah	park boundary near Billings Pass	Colorado Plateau	8,960 feet (2,730 m)	Halls Creek	3,877 feet (1,182 m)	5,083 feet (1,549 m)
24	Crater Lake	Oregon	Mount Scott	Cascade Range	8,929 feet (2,722 m)	SW corner of park	3,990 feet (1,220 m)	4,939 feet (1,505 m)
25	Guadalupe Mountains	Texas	Guadalupe Peak	Guadalupe Mountains	8,749 feet (2,667 m)	SW corner near Williams Road	3,636 feet (1,108 m)	5,113 feet (1,558 m)
26	Zion	Utah	Horse Ranch Mountain	Colorado Plateau	8,726 feet (2,660 m)	SW corner near Rt.9	3,640 feet (1,110 m)	5,086 feet (1,550 m)
27	Saguaro	Arizona	Mica Mountain	Rincon Mountains	8,666 feet (2,641 m)	Rudasill & Sanders Roads, Tucson Mountain District	2,180 feet (660 m)	6,486 feet (1,977 m)
28	Mesa Verde	Colorado	Park Point Lookout	Colorado Plateau	8,571 feet (2,612 m)	Soda Canyon	6,015 feet (1,833 m)	2,556 feet (779 m)
29	Gates of the Arctic	Alaska	Mount Igikpak	Brooks Range	8,276 feet (2,523 m)	Kobuk River	280 feet (85 m)	7,996 feet (2,437 m)
30	Olympic	Washington (state)	Mount Olympus	Olympic Mountains	7,962 feet (2,427 m)	Pacific Ocean	0 feet (0 m)	7,962 feet (2,427 m)
31	Big Bend	Texas	Emory Peak	Chisos Mountains	7,825 feet (2,385 m)	Rio Grande	1,715 feet (523 m)	6,110 feet (1,860 m)
32	Katmai	Alaska	Mount Denison	Aleutian Range	7,606 feet (2,318 m)	Shelikof Strait	0 feet (0 m)	7,606 feet (2,318 m)
33	Canyonlands	Utah	Cathedral Point	Colorado Plateau	7,120 feet (2,170 m)	Colorado River	3,730 feet (1,140 m)	3,390 feet (1,030 m)
34	Great Smoky Mountains	Tennessee North Carolina	Kuwohi	Great Smoky Mountains	6,643 feet (2,025 m)	Chilhowee Lake	874 feet (266 m)	5,769 feet (1,758 m)
35	Carlsbad Caverns	New Mexico	Guadalupe Ridge	Guadalupe Mountains	6,535 feet (1,992 m)	Black River	3,596 feet (1,096 m)	2,939 feet (896 m)
36	Kenai Fjords	Alaska	unnamed nunatak	Harding Icefield	6,450 feet (1,970 m)	Gulf of Alaska	0 feet (0 m)	6,450 feet (1,970 m)
37	Petrified Forest	Arizona	Pilot Rock	Painted Desert	6,234 feet (1,900 m)	BNSF Railway	5,200 feet (1,600 m)	1,034 feet (315 m)
38	Joshua Tree	California	Quail Mountain	Little San Bernardino Mountains	5,813 feet (1,772 m)	Southeast boundary of the park	536 ft (163 m)	4,033 feet (1,229 m)
39	Arches	Utah	Elephant Butte	Colorado Plateau	5,653 feet (1,723 m)	Colorado River	3,960 feet (1,210 m)	1,693 feet (516 m)
40	Wind Cave	South Dakota	Rankin Ridge	Black Hills	5,013 feet (1,528 m)	Windy City Lake	3,559 feet (1,085 m)	1,454 feet (443 m)
41	Kobuk Valley	Alaska	Mount Angayukaqsraq	Baird Mountains	4,760 feet (1,450 m)	Kobuk River	40 feet (12 m)	4,720 feet (1,440 m)
42	White Sands	New Mexico	NE30	Tularosa Basin	4,116 feet (1,255 m)	Lake Lucero	3,887 feet (1,185 m)	229 feet (70 m)
43	Shenandoah	Virginia	Hawksbill Mountain	Blue Ridge Mountains	4,051 feet (1,235 m)	unnamed stream at north end	530 feet (160 m)	3,521 feet (1,073 m)
44	Badlands	South Dakota	Red Shirt Table	The Badlands	3,340 feet (1,020 m)	runoff channel SE of Ben Reifel Visitor Center	2,365 feet (721 m)	975 feet (297 m)
45	Pinnacles	California	North Chalone Peak	Gabilan Range	3,304 feet (1,007 m)	SE Corner	824 feet (251 m)	2,480 feet (760 m)
46	New River Gorge	West Virginia	Swell Mountain	Allegheny Mountains	3,291 feet (1,003 m)	New River	900 feet (270 m)	2,391 feet (729 m)
47	American Samoa		Lata Mountain	Ta'u Island, Samoan Islands	3,170 feet (970 m)	Pacific Ocean	0 feet (0 m)	3,170 feet (970 m)
48	Redwood	California	Coyote Peak	Bald Hills	3,170 feet (970 m)	Pacific Ocean	0 feet (0 m)	3,170 feet (970 m)
49	Theodore Roosevelt	North Dakota	Peck Hill	The Badlands	2,860 feet (870 m)	Little Missouri River	1,940 feet (590 m)	920 feet (280 m)
50	Channel Islands	California	Devils Peak, Santa Cruz Island	Channel Islands	2,450 feet (750 m)	Pacific Ocean	0 feet (0 m)	2,450 feet (750 m)
51	Acadia	Maine	Cadillac Mountain		1,530 feet (470 m)	Atlantic Ocean	0 feet (0 m)	1,530 feet (470 m)
52	Voyageurs	Minnesota	Tower near Mead Wood Road entrance		1,410 feet (430 m)	Rainy Lake	1,108 feet (338 m)	302 feet (92 m)
53	Hot Springs	Arkansas	Music Mountain	Ouachita Mountains	1,405 feet (428 m)	Bull Bayou	415 feet (126 m)	990 feet (300 m)
54	Isle Royale	Michigan	Mount Desor	Superior Upland	1,394 feet (425 m)	Lake Superior	600 feet (180 m)	794 feet (242 m)
55	Virgin Islands	U.S. Virgin Islands	Bordeaux Mountain	Saint John Island, Virgin Islands	1,277 feet (389 m)	Atlantic Ocean (Caribbean Sea)	0 feet (0 m)	1,277 feet (389 m)
56	Cuyahoga Valley	Ohio	Black & Brush Roads	Glaciated Allegheny Plateau	1,164 feet (355 m)	Cuyahoga River	590 feet (180 m)	574 feet (175 m)
57	Mammoth Cave	Kentucky	Mammoth Cave Ridge near Park Ridge Road	Pennyroyal Plateau	925 feet (282 m)	Green River	421 feet (128 m)	504 feet (154 m)
58	Indiana Dunes		Upland Trail, Pinhook Bog Unit		900 feet (270 m)	Lake Michigan	577 feet (176 m)	323 feet (98 m)
59	Gateway Arch	Missouri	Old Courthouse		470 feet (140 m)	Mississippi River	433 feet (132 m)	37 feet (11 m)
60	Congaree	South Carolina	Old Bluff Road near main entrance		140 feet (43 m)	Congaree River	80 feet (24 m)	60 feet (18 m)
61	Everglades	Florida	Calusa shell mound		20 feet (6.1 m)	Atlantic Ocean	0 feet (0 m)	20 feet (6.1 m)
62	Dry Tortugas	Florida	Loggerhead Key	Florida Keys	10 feet (3.0 m)	Gulf of Mexico	0 feet (0 m)	10 feet (3.0 m)
63	Biscayne	Florida	Totten Key, Old Rhodes Key	Florida Keys	9 feet (2.7 m)	Atlantic Ocean	0 feet (0 m)	9 feet (2.7 m)

== Selected Profiles ==
- The AT thru the Smokeys – The Appalachian Trail crosses through Great Smokey Mountains and Shenandoah National Parks. It reaches its highest point at Kuwohi.
- Skyline Drive map and profile – Skyline Drive runs the length of Shenandoah.
- PCT Elevation Profiles – The Pacific Crest Trail goes through seven national parks.
  - North Cascades – Washington section K
  - Mount Rainier – Washington section I
  - Crater Lake – Oregon section C
  - Lassen Volcanic – California section N
  - Yosemite – California sections H & I
  - Kings Canyon – California section H
  - Sequoia – California sections G & H
- Wonderland Trail – An elevation profile of the Wonderland Trail around Mount Rainier.

== See also ==
- List of U.S. states and territories by elevation
- List of national parks of the United States
