= The Wild Rose =

The Wild Rose or The Wildrose may refer to:

- The Wild Rose (1902 musical), 1902 musical with music by Ludwig Engländer and both book and lyrics by Harry B. Smith and George V. Hobart.
- The Wild Rose (1926 musical), 1926 musical with both book and lyrics co-authored by Otto Harbach and Oscar Hammerstein II, and music by Rudolf Friml.
- The Wildrose (bar), Lesbian bar in Seattle, Washington

== See also ==
- Wild Rose
