= Tijeras Peak =

Mountain in Colorado, United States

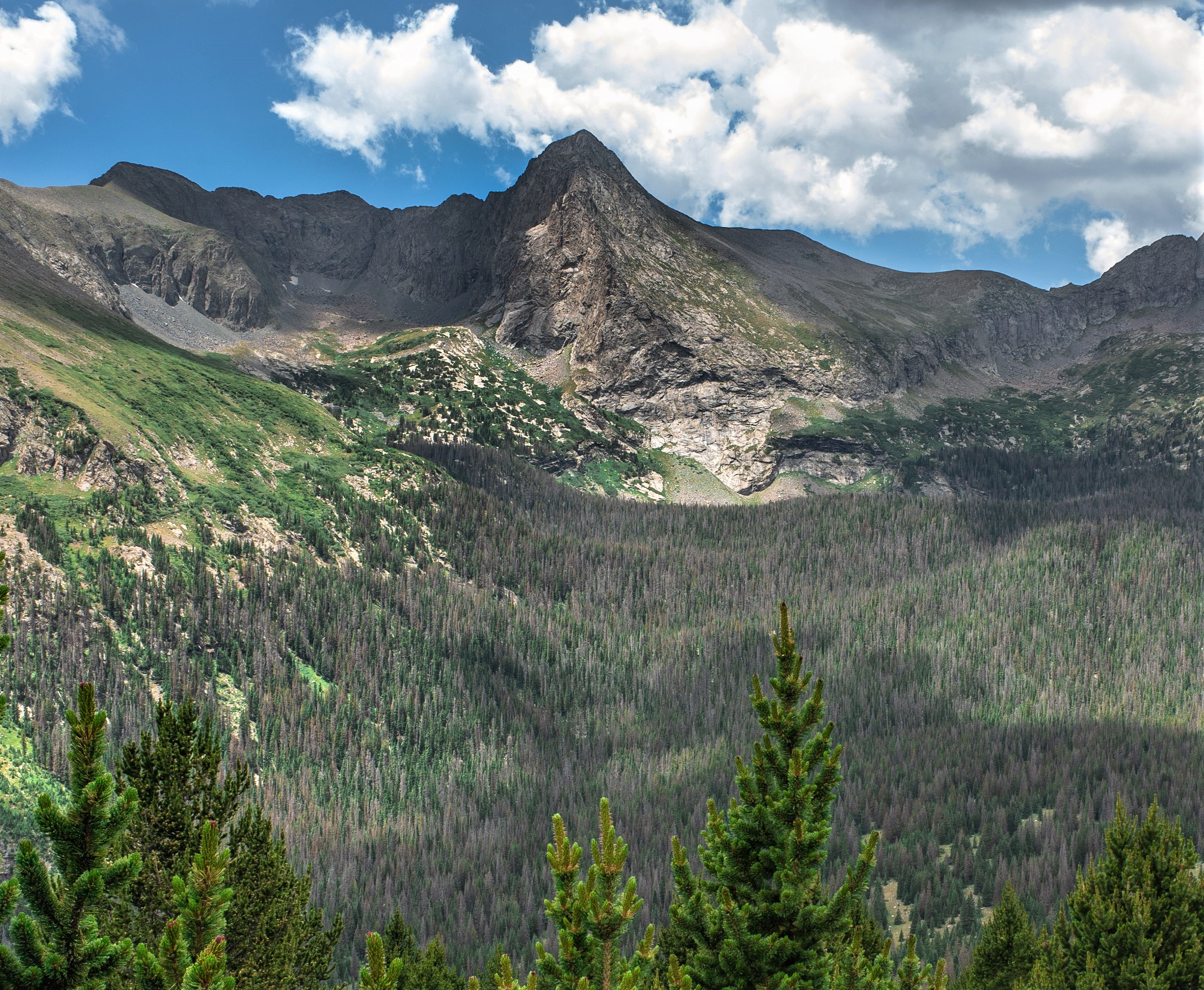
- East aspect, from Music Pass

Highest point
- Elevation: 13,610 ft (4,148 m)
- Prominence: 744 ft (227 m)
- Isolation: 1.70 mi (2.74 km)
- Coordinates: 37°55′28″N 105°32′25″W

Geography
- Location within Colorado
- Location: Great Sand Dunes National Park and Preserve, Saguache County, Colorado, United States
- Parent range: Sangre de Cristo Range
- Topo map(s): USGS 7.5' topographic map Crestone Peak, Colorado

Tijeras Peak is a high mountain summit in the Sangre de Cristo Range of the Rocky Mountains of North America. The 13,610-foot (4,148 m) thirteener is located 9.8 miles (15.8 km) southeast by east (bearing 120°) of the Town of Crestone in Saguache County, Colorado, United States, in the Sangre de Cristo Wilderness on the boundary between Great Sand Dunes National Preserve and Rio Grande National Forest. Tijeras Peak is the highest summit in Great Sand Dunes National Park and Preserve. Tijeras is Spanish for scissors, and refers to the double-pronged rocky tip of the mountain.

== Historical names ==
- Tijeras Peak – 1970
- Tiseras Peak

== See also ==
- List of Colorado mountain ranges
- List of Colorado mountain summits
  - List of Colorado fourteeners
  - List of Colorado 4000 meter prominent summits
  - List of the most prominent summits of Colorado
- List of Colorado county high points
