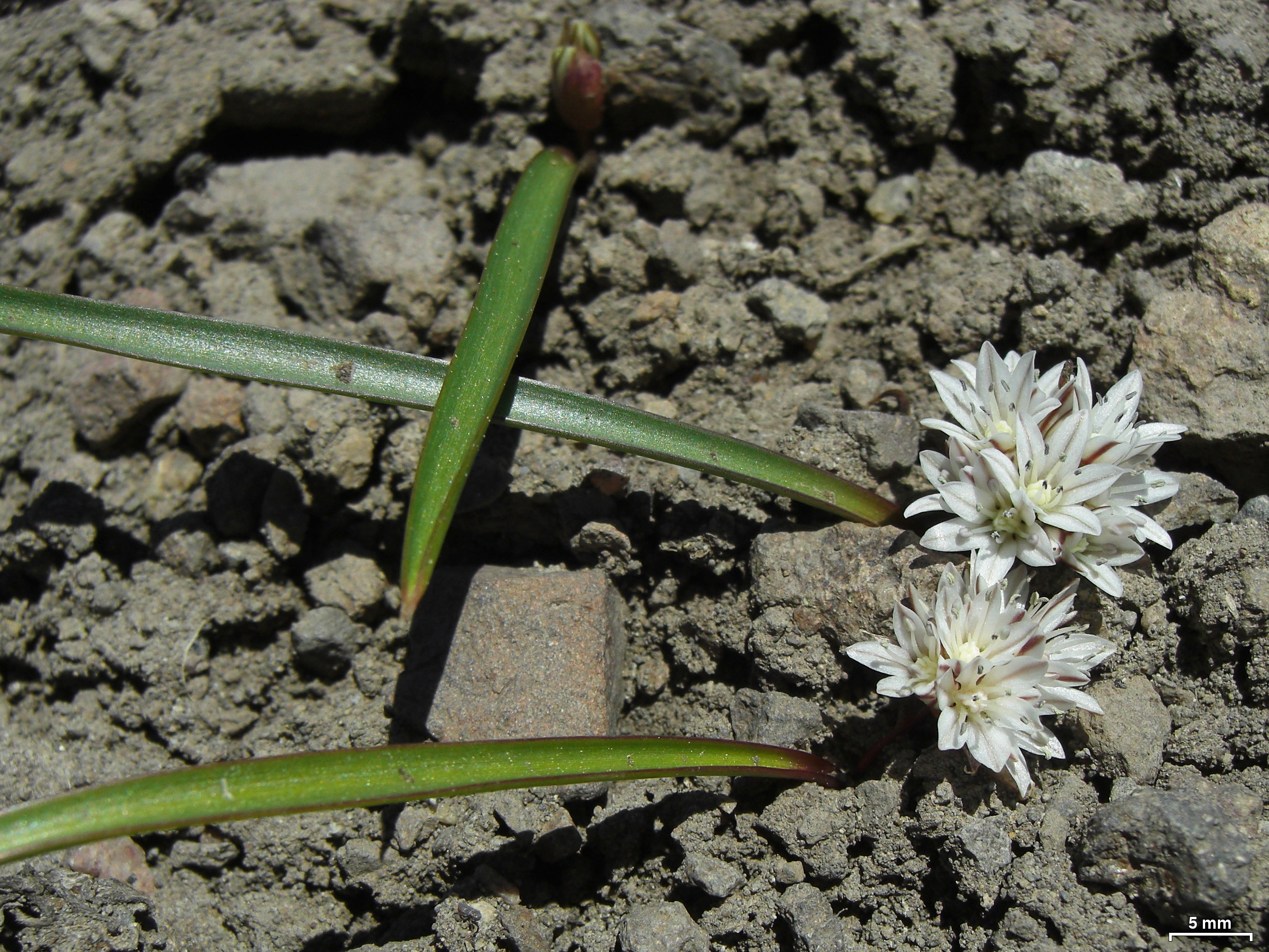

Conservation status
- Imperiled (NatureServe)

Scientific classification
- Kingdom: Plantae
- Clade: Tracheophytes
- Clade: Angiosperms
- Clade: Monocots
- Order: Asparagales
- Family: Amaryllidaceae
- Subfamily: Allioideae
- Genus: Allium
- Species: A. tribracteatum

Binomial name
- Allium tribracteatum Torr.

Synonyms
- Allium tolmiei Baker ex J.M.Coult. 1885, illegitimate homonym not Baker 1876

= Allium tribracteatum =

Threebract onion

Species of flowering plant

Allium tribracteatum, known by the common name Threebract onion, is a species of wild onion found in California.

== Distribution and habitat ==
The plant is endemic to California, where it is known only from the slopes of the Sierra Nevada in Tuolumne and Calaveras Counties.

== Description ==
Allium tribracteatum is a small onion plant producing a stem only a few centimeters long from an oval-shaped bulb. There are two leaves which are usually much longer than the stem. The inflorescence contains up to 30 petite white to purple flowers, each less than a centimeter long. Tepals are white to pink with red or purple midveins; anthers purple; pollen gray. Flowers bloom March to May.
