= Rogers Peak (California) =

Mountain in California, United States

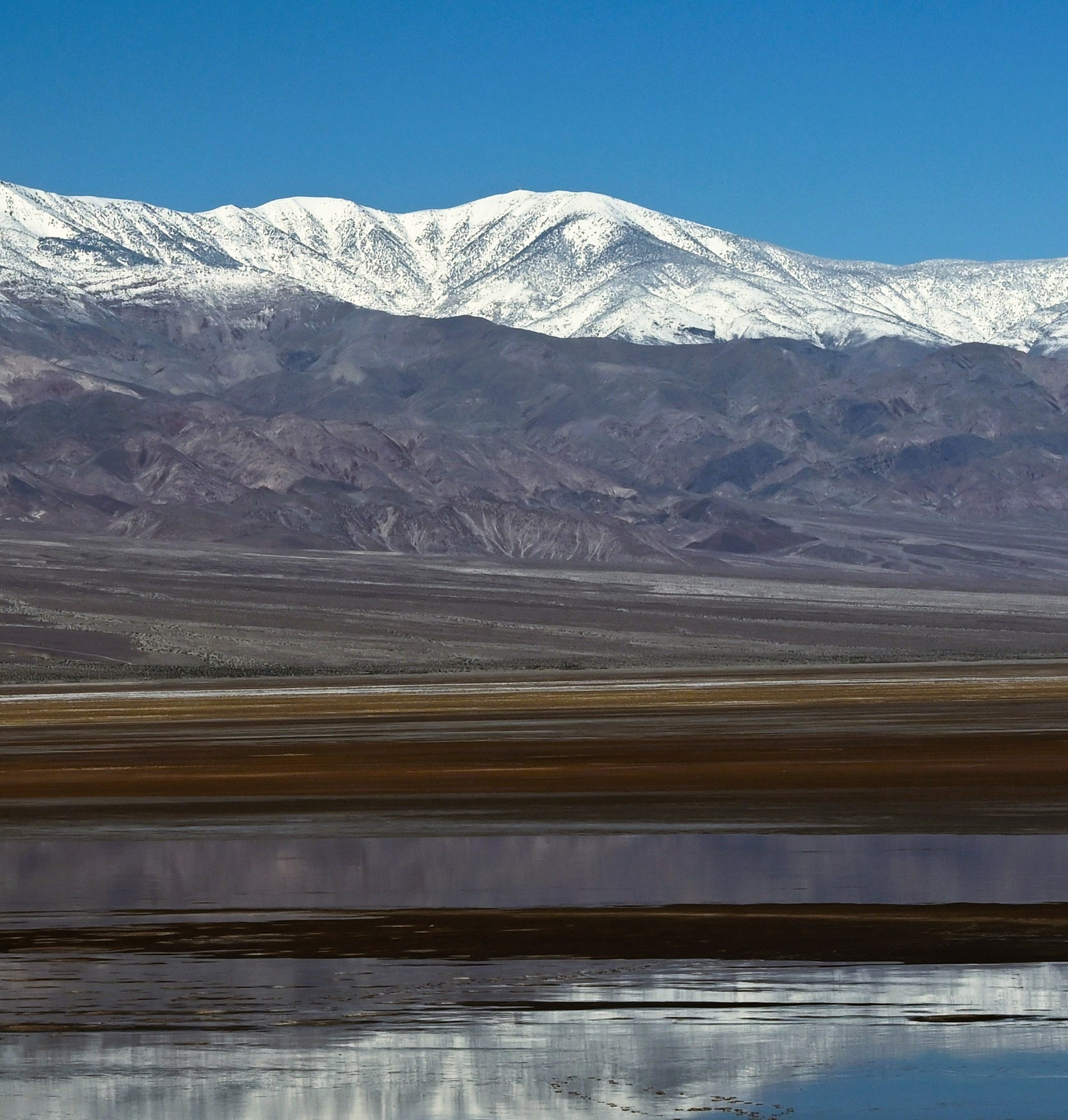
- East aspect

Highest point
- Elevation: 9,991 ft (3,045 m)
- Prominence: 360 ft (110 m)
- Parent peak: Telescope Peak
- Isolation: 3.33 mi (5.36 km)
- Coordinates: 36°13′05″N 117°05′06″W

Naming
- Etymology: John Haney Rogers

Geography
- Location within California Location within the United States
- Country: United States
- State: California
- County: Inyo
- Protected area: Death Valley National Park
- Parent range: Panamint Range
- Topo map: USGS Telescope Peak

Geology
- Rock age: Precambrian-Cambrian
- Mountain type: Fault block
- Rock type: Sedimentary rock

Climbing
- Easiest route: class 1 hiking

Rogers Peak is a 9,991-foot-elevation (3,045-meter) summit in Inyo County, California, United States.

== Description ==
Rogers Peak is the fourth-highest mountain of the Panamint Range, and it is set within Death Valley National Park and the Mojave Desert. Precipitation runoff from this mountain's east slope drains to Death Valley via Hanaupah Canyon, whereas the west slope drains to Panamint Valley via Wildrose and Tuber canyons. Topographic relief is significant as the summit rises 10,200 feet (3,109 meters) above Badwater Basin in 12 miles (19 km). The mountain is composed of Precambrian-Cambrian limestone, a marine sedimentary rock. The summit offers a stunning 360-degree panorama of Death Valley and the eastern Sierra Nevada mountain range including the lowest and highest points in the contiguous United States: Badwater Basin and Mount Whitney. The summit of Rogers Peak has been used as a communications and instrumentation site by various government agencies since the late 1950s. This mountain's toponym has been officially adopted by the United States Board on Geographic Names. The peak is named after John Haney Rogers (1822–1906), a member of a party of settlers who became lost and stranded in Death Valley in 1850.

== Climate ==
According to the Köppen climate classification system, Rogers Peak has a cold desert climate, with the lower valleys in a hot desert climate zone. Temperatures average between 0 °F to 30 °F in January, and 50 °F to 100 °F in July. Typical of high deserts, summer temperatures can be exceedingly hot, while winter temperatures can be very cold. Snowfall is common, but the snow melts rapidly in the arid and sunny climate. Rainfall is very low, supporting a pinyon–juniper woodland on the mountain's slopes.

== See also ==
- Geology of the Death Valley area
- Mountains of Death Valley National Park
- Death Valley '49ers

== Gallery ==
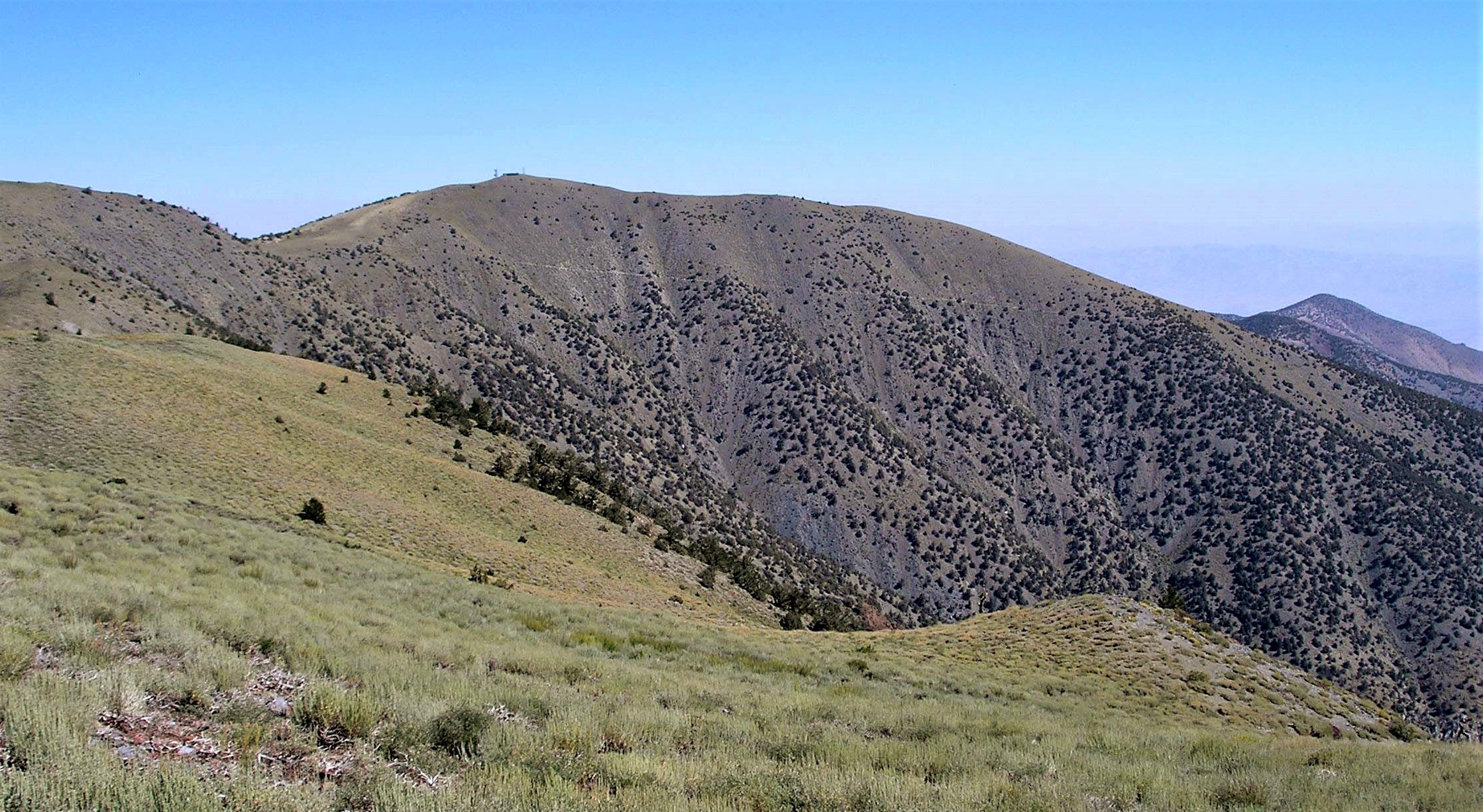
South aspect

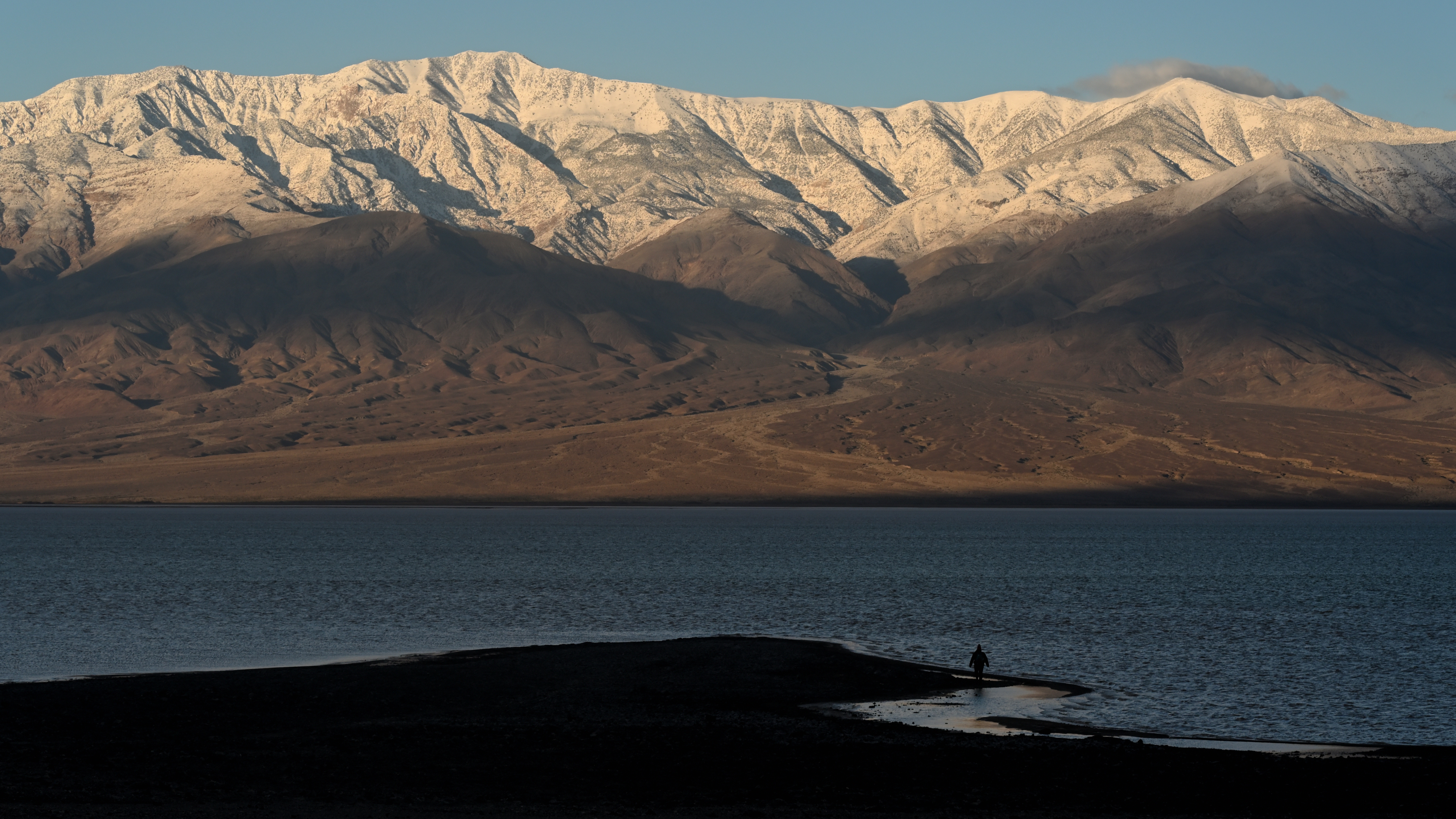
Telescope Peak (left) and Rogers Peak to right with cloud behind it.
View from Badwater Basin.

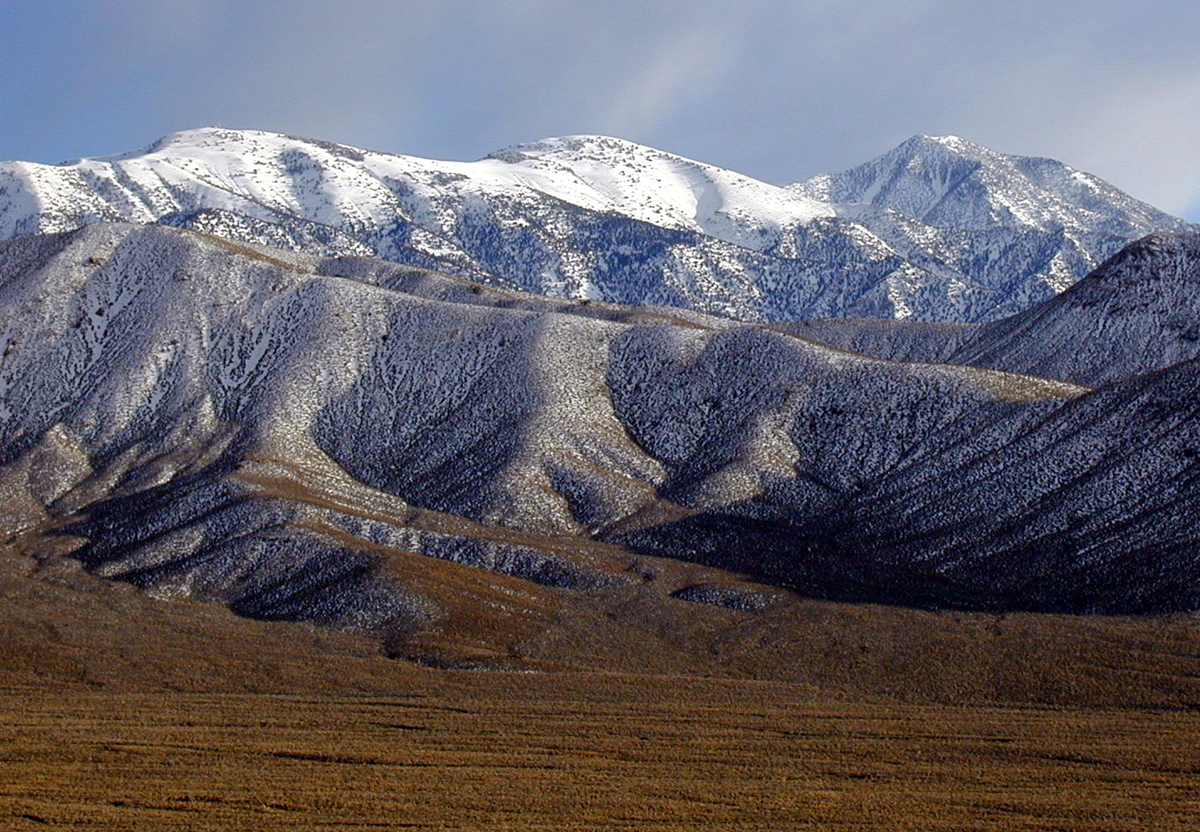
View from north at Wildrose Canyon with Rogers Peak (left), Bennett Peak (middle), Telescope Peak (right)

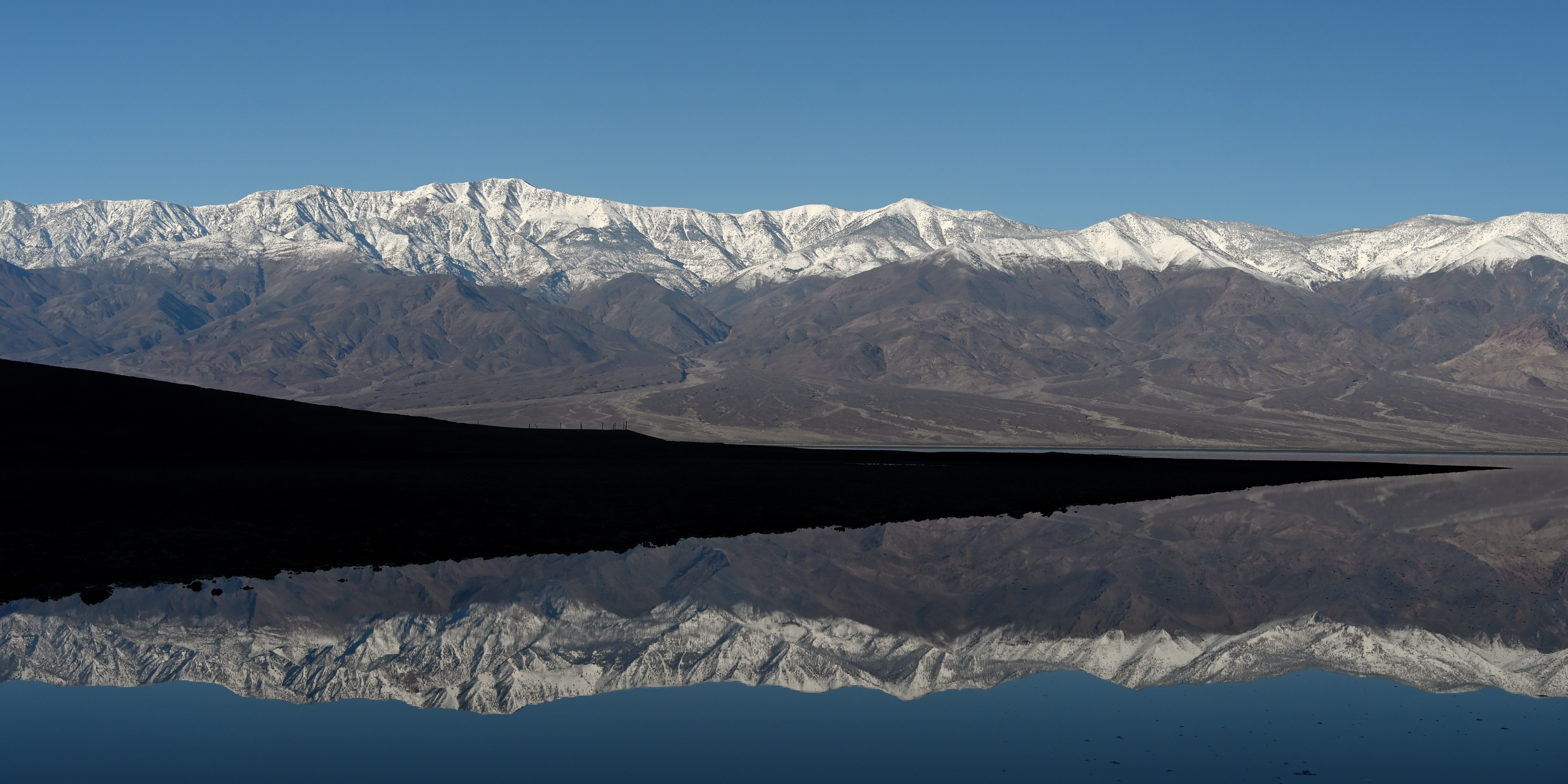
Panamint Range with Rogers Peak right of center

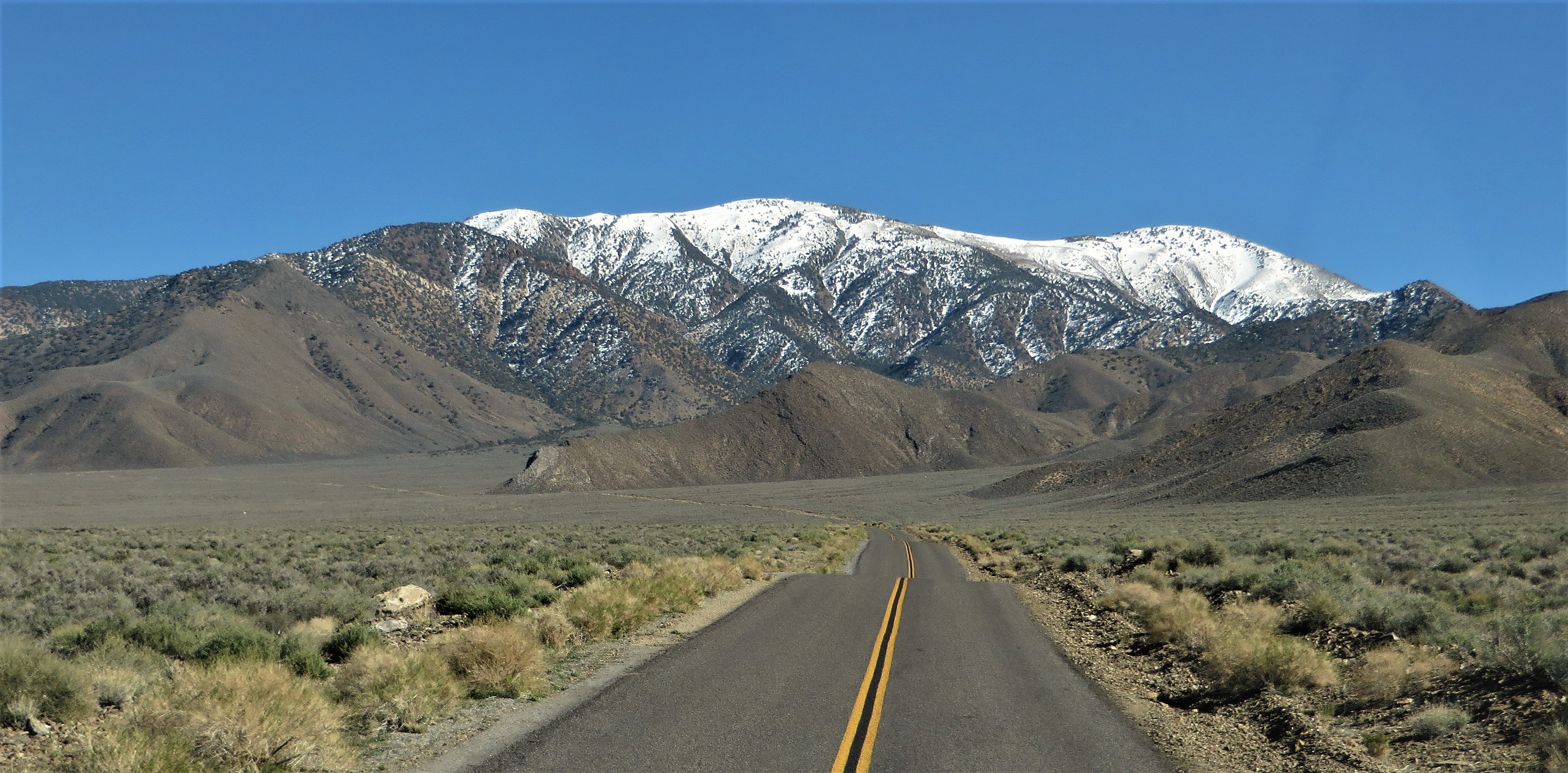
Northwest aspect of Rogers Peak centered with Bennett Peak to right, viewed from Mahogany Flat/Wildrose Canyon Road.

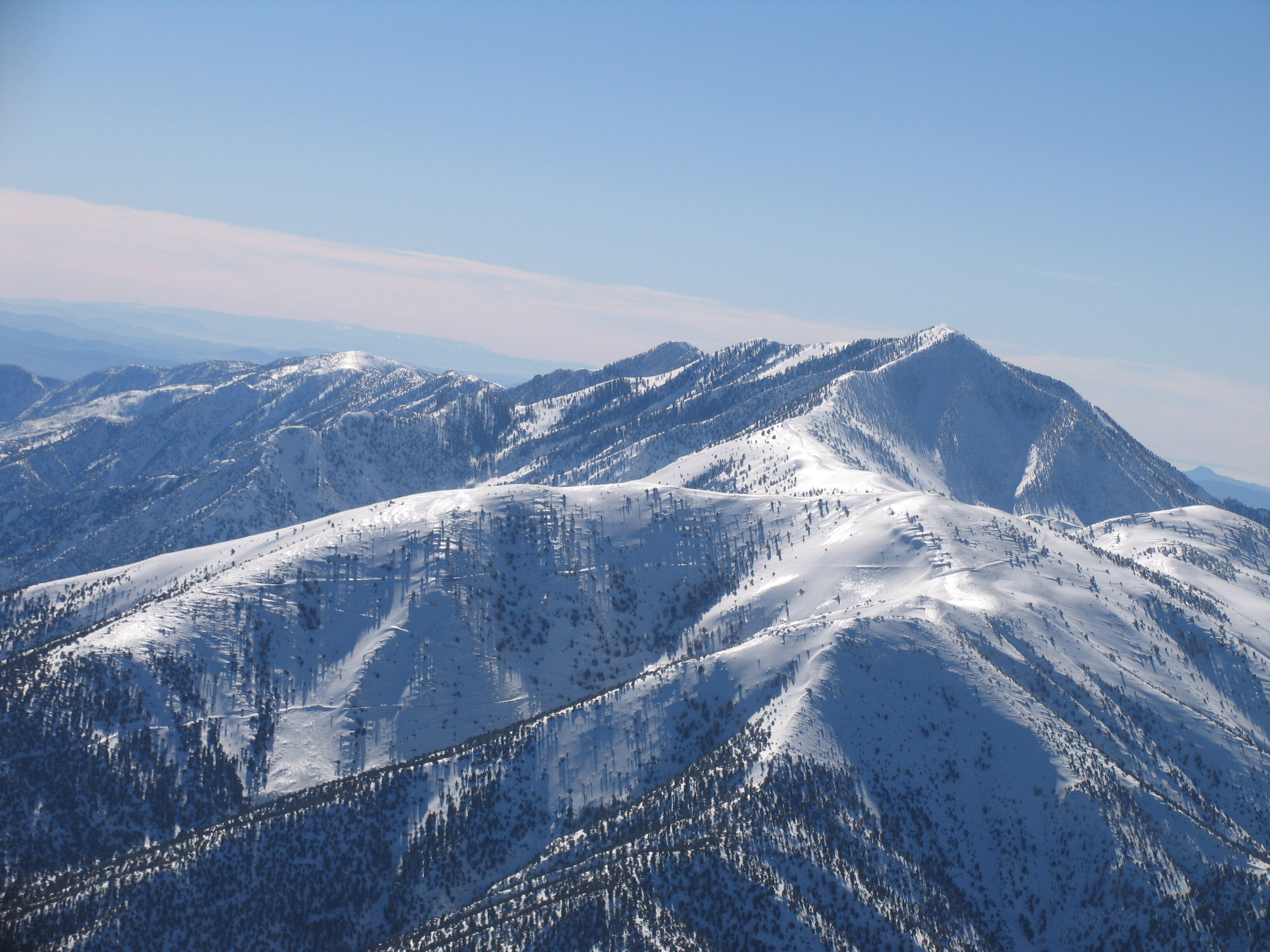
Aerial view of Rogers Peak and Telescope Peak in winter. Camera pointed south.
