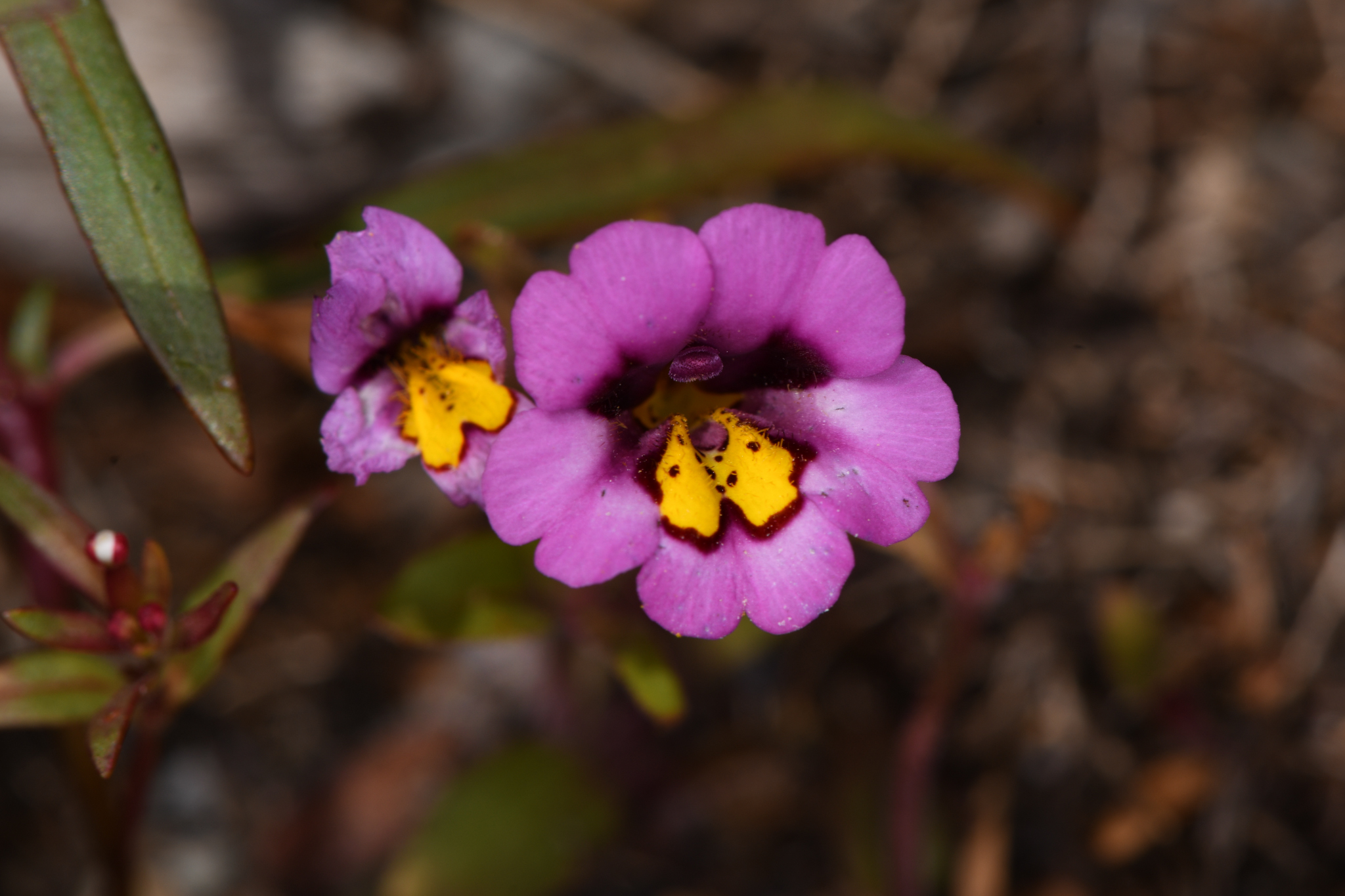

Conservation status
- Imperiled (NatureServe)

Scientific classification
- Kingdom: Plantae
- Clade: Tracheophytes
- Clade: Angiosperms
- Clade: Eudicots
- Clade: Asterids
- Order: Lamiales
- Family: Phrymaceae
- Genus: Erythranthe
- Species: E. filicaulis

Binomial name
- Erythranthe filicaulis (S.Watson) G.L.Nesom & N.S.Fraga

Synonyms
- Mimulus biolettii Eastw.; Mimulus filicaulis S.Watson

= Erythranthe filicaulis =

Species of flowering plant

Erythranthe filicaulis, known by the common name slender-stemmed monkeyflower, is a species of monkeyflower. It was formerly known as Mimulus filicaulis.

== Description ==
Erythranthe filicaulis can carpet an area with its low-lying pink blooms. This is a hairy annual herb producing a thin, erect stem up to about 30 centimetres (12 in) tall. The oppositely arranged linear to oval leaves are up to about 2 cm long.

The tubular base of the flower is encapsulated in a ribbed, red-dotted calyx of sepals with pointed lobes. The corolla of the flower is not distinctly divided into an upper and lower lip, but it has five rounded, notched lobes. The corolla is pink with a deeper pink to purple throat with a prominent yellow spot on the raised folds of the lower lobes. Its bloom period is April to August, depending on elevation.

== Distribution and habitat ==
Erythranthe filicaulis is endemic to California, where it is known only from the High Sierra Nevada within Mariposa and Tuolumne Counties. Its habitat includes moist areas such as mountain meadows and habitat with disturbed soil from 1,200 to 1,750 metres (3,940 to 5,740 ft) in elevation.
