= Erigeron consimilis =

Conservation status
- Apparently Secure (NatureServe)

Scientific classification
- Kingdom: Plantae
- Clade: Tracheophytes
- Clade: Angiosperms
- Clade: Eudicots
- Clade: Asterids
- Order: Asterales
- Family: Asteraceae
- Genus: Erigeron
- Species: E. consimilis

Binomial name
- Erigeron consimilis Cronquist

Synonyms
- Erigeron compactus var. consimilis (Cronquist) S.F.Blake

Species of flowering plant

Erigeron consimilis is a North American species of flowering plants in the family Asteraceae known by the common names foothill fleabane and San Rafael fleabane. It is found in the western United States: Arizona, New Mexico, Utah, Colorado, Wyoming.

Erigeron consimilis is a very small perennial herb up to 10 cm (4 inches) tall, forming a taproot. Most of the leaves are low and close to the ground. Each stem produces only one flower head, with 30–55 white or pink ray florets plus numerous yellow disc florets.
