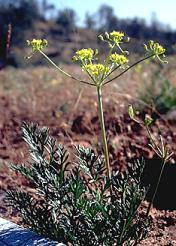

Conservation status
- Imperiled (NatureServe)

Scientific classification
- Kingdom: Plantae
- Clade: Tracheophytes
- Clade: Angiosperms
- Clade: Eudicots
- Clade: Asterids
- Order: Apiales
- Family: Apiaceae
- Genus: Lomatium
- Species: L. congdonii

Binomial name
- Lomatium congdonii J.M.Coult. & Rose

= Lomatium congdonii =

Species of flowering plant

Lomatium congdonii, known by the common names Mariposa desertparsley and Congdon's lomatium, is a species of flowering plant in the carrot family.

== Description ==
Lomatium congdonii is a perennial herb growing from a fibrous basal stem and taproot and producing upright inflorescences and leaves. The leaves are up to about 20 centimetres (8 in) long and are intricately divided into many sharp-pointed segments. The erect inflorescence is an umbel of light yellow flowers.

== Distribution and habitat ==
Lomatium congdonii is endemic to California, where it is known from only about 20 occurrences in the Sierra Nevada foothills of Mariposa and Tuolumne Counties. It grows in oak woodland habitat, often on serpentine soils.

== See also ==
- Joseph Whipple Congdon
- List of plants of the Sierra Nevada (U.S.)
