= Joseph Whipple Congdon =

American lawyer

Joseph Whipple Congdon (April 13, 1834 – April 5, 1910) was a lawyer by trade who contributed significantly to early botanical exploration in California, particularly in the Yosemite region, where he resided in Mariposa from 1882 until 1905. Congdon was born in Pomfret, Connecticut and graduated Brown University with the class of 1855. He was admitted to the bar in Providence, Rhode Island in 1860. He served a term in the Rhode Island legislature for 1878–79. The "Analytical Class-Book of Botany", coauthored with his aunt, [carrying the epigram "Science is the only interpreter of Nature"] antedated by two years the first edition of Class Book of Botany, by Asa Gray. Congdon was the botanist whom correctly diagnosed the rediscovery of the long-lost Shortia galacifolia, a relict herb that had been long sought by Gray.

Congdon discovered over 30 new species of plants, many of which are rare and endemic to the Yosemite region, including Lewisia congdonii, Eriophyllum congdonii, Garrya congdonii, Lomatium congdonii, Monolopia congdonii, and others.

Congdon's collection in Yosemite National Park form an important record of that flora: he was the first botanist to collect the rare Yosemite bog-orchid (Platanthera yosemitensis) in 1895; a species that was not recognized as distinct until 2007

== Reading ==
- Jenkins, Charles F. (1942). "Asa Gray and his quest for Shortia glaucifolia". Arnoldia Vol. 2:13–28.
- Jepson, Willis L. (1928). "The botanical explorers of California-II". Joseph Whipple Congdon. Madrono Vol. 1:175–177.

== Publications ==
- Greene, Francis and Joseph W. Congdon. (1855). Analytical Class-Book of Botany. D. Appleton & Co., New York.
- Congdon, J.W. (1891). "Mariposa County as a botanical district". Zoe 2:234–236.
- Congdon, J.W. (1900). "New species, principally from Mariposa County". Erythea 7:183–189.
- Congdon, J.W. (1904). "A new Lupine from California". Muhlenbergia 1:38. 1904.
