= Temple Crag =

Mountain in California, United States

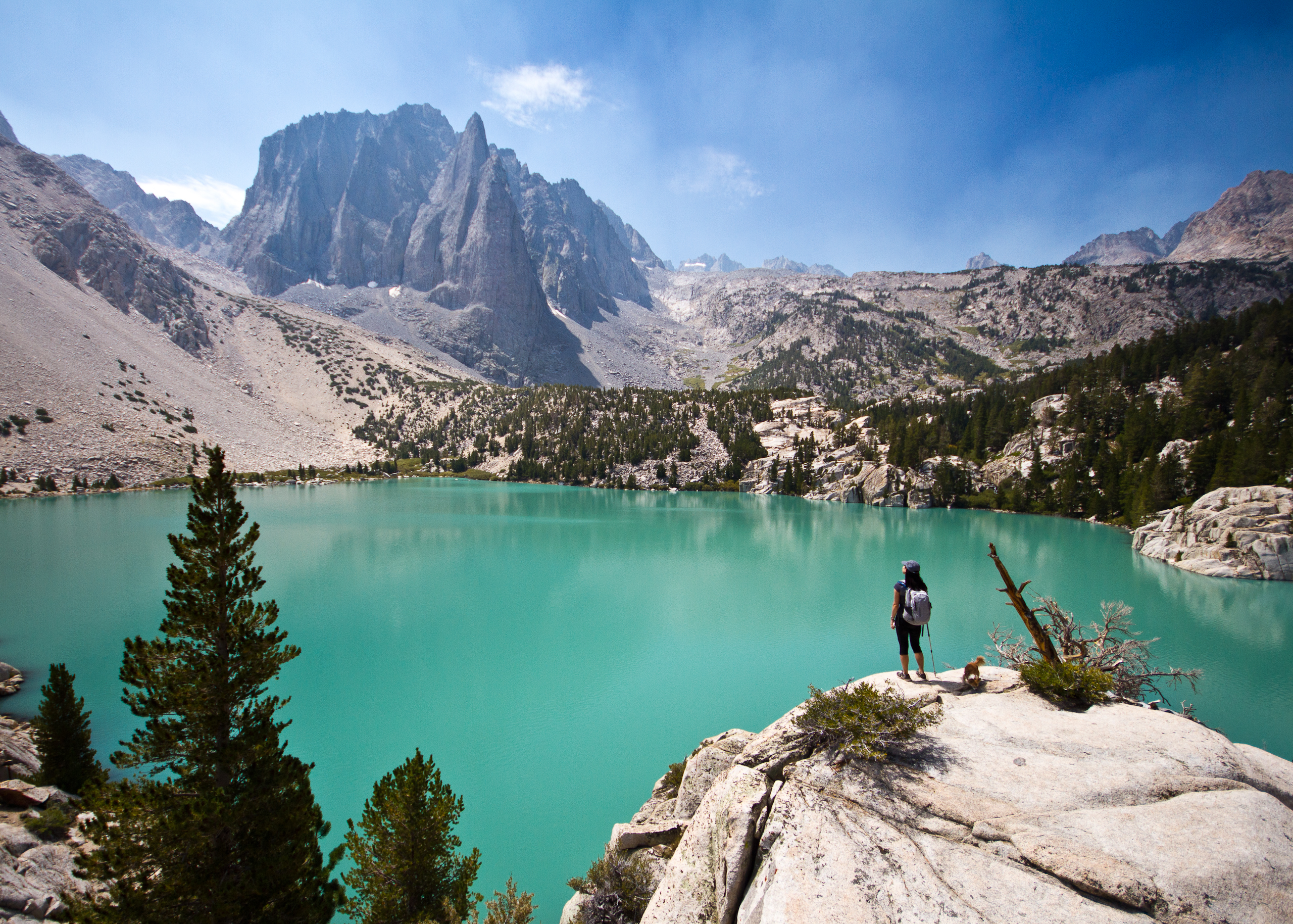
- Temple Crag from Second Lake, in the North Fork of Big Pine Creek drainage.

Highest point
- Elevation: 12,982 ft (3,957 m) NAVD 88
- Prominence: 246 ft (75 m)
- Parent peak: Mount Gayley
- Listing: Sierra Peaks Section; Western State Climbers Emblem peak
- Coordinates: 37°06′35″N 118°29′33″W

Geography
- Location within California
- Location: Inyo County, California, U.S.
- Parent range: Sierra Nevada
- Topo map: USGS Split Mountain

Climbing
- Easiest route: Exposed scramble, class 3

Temple Crag is a mountain peak in the Palisades group of peaks of the Sierra Nevada with an elevation of 12,982 feet (3,957 m). The peak lies east of the Sierra Crest, between Mount Gayley and Mount Alice, straddling the drainages of the North and South Forks of Big Pine Creek. The peak's north face forms the backdrop for part of the North Fork Big Pine Creek hiking trail in the John Muir Wilderness and Inyo National Forest. It is also a rock climbing destination, with its arêtes hosting the routes Venusian Blind, Moon Goddess Arete, Sun Ribbon Arete, and Dark Star.

== See also ==
- Mountain peaks of California
- The Palisades of the Sierra Nevada
