= Telescope Peak =

Mountain in California, United States

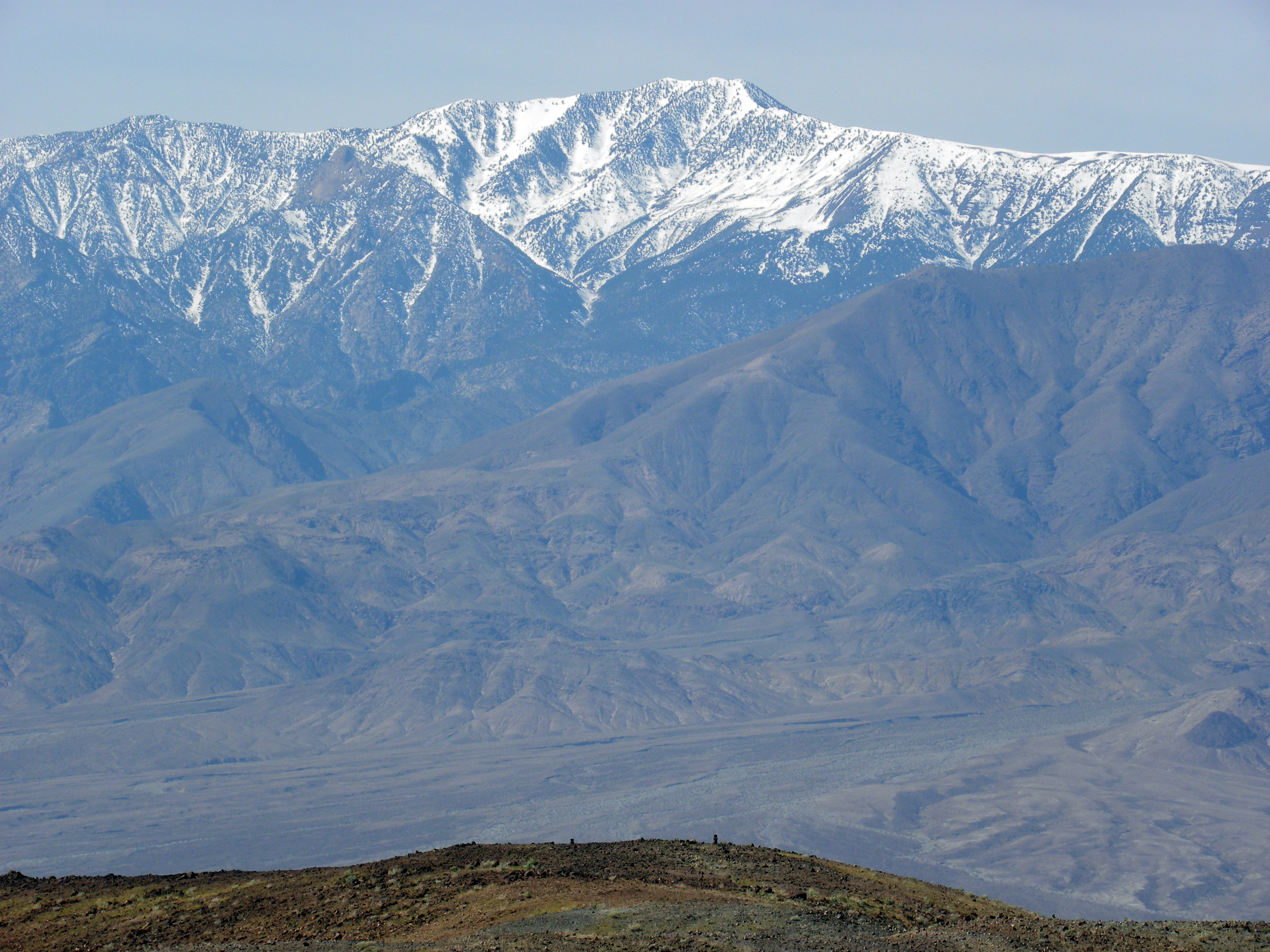
- Telescope Peak viewed from Devil's Golf Course, Death Valley, California

Highest point
- Elevation: 11,043 ft (3,366 m) NAVD 88
- Prominence: 6,168 ft (1,880 m)
- Parent peak: White Mountain Peak
- Listing: US most prominent peaks 55th; DPS Emblem peak; HPS peak; GBPL peak
- Coordinates: 36°10′11″N 117°05′21″W

Geography
- Location within California
- Location: Death Valley National Park, Inyo County, California, U.S.
- Parent range: Panamint Range
- Topo map: USGS Telescope Peak

Climbing
- Easiest route: Trail from Mahogany Flat (hike)

Telescope Peak (Timbisha: Chiombe) is the highest point within Death Valley National Park, in the U.S. state of California. It is also the highest point of the Panamint Range, and lies in Inyo County. From atop this desert mountain one can see for over one hundred miles in many directions, including west to Mount Whitney, and east to Charleston Peak. The mountain was named for the great distance visible from the summit.

== Geography ==
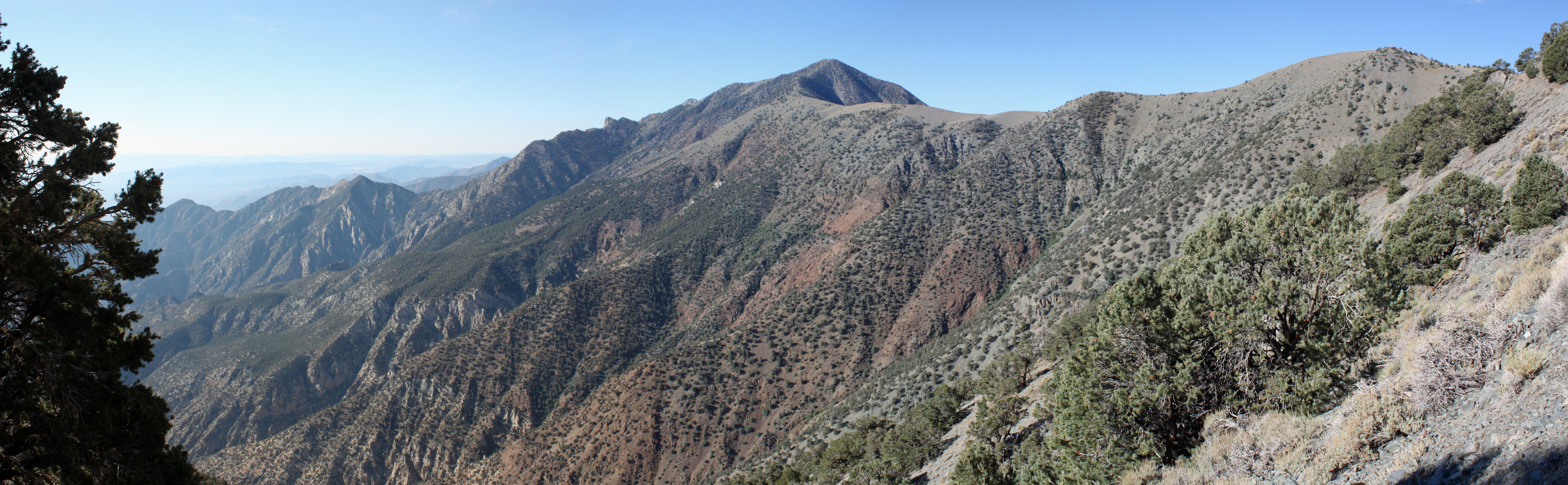
Telescope Peak from trail out of Mahogany Flat Campground (The summit is to the left of the highest apparent peak in the image.)

Telescope Peak is also notable for having one of the greatest vertical rises above local terrain of any mountain in the contiguous United States. Its summit rises 11,331 feet (3,454 m) above the lowest point in Death Valley, Badwater Basin at −282 feet (−86 m), in about 15 miles (24 km), and about 10,000 feet (3,000 m) above the floor of Panamint Valley in about 8 miles (13 km). This is comparable to the rises of other tall, but better known, U.S. peaks. It is even somewhat comparable to the rise of Mount Everest above its northern base on the Tibetan Plateau, a rise of roughly 13,000 feet (4,000 m). However, Everest rises much more, and much more steeply, above its southern base in Nepal.

Since it is the high point of a range surrounded by low basins, Telescope Peak also has a particularly high topographic prominence of 6,168 feet (1,880 m), ranking it 22nd in the contiguous US by that measure.

A variety of trees can be found on the mountain, including single-leaf pinyon (Pinus monophylla), limber pine (Pinus flexilis), and, at the highest elevations, the ancient Great Basin bristlecone pine (Pinus longaeva).

== Climbing ==
From Ridgecrest, California State Route 178 leads northeast into Death Valley National Park. The road turns to unpaved about 50 miles (80 km) later as it loses its highway status. It winds up through Wildrose Canyon up to a parking lot where the trail for the summit starts. The section from the Charcoal Kilns can be rough and might only be suitable for 4-wheel-drive cars with high clearance, depending on weather conditions.

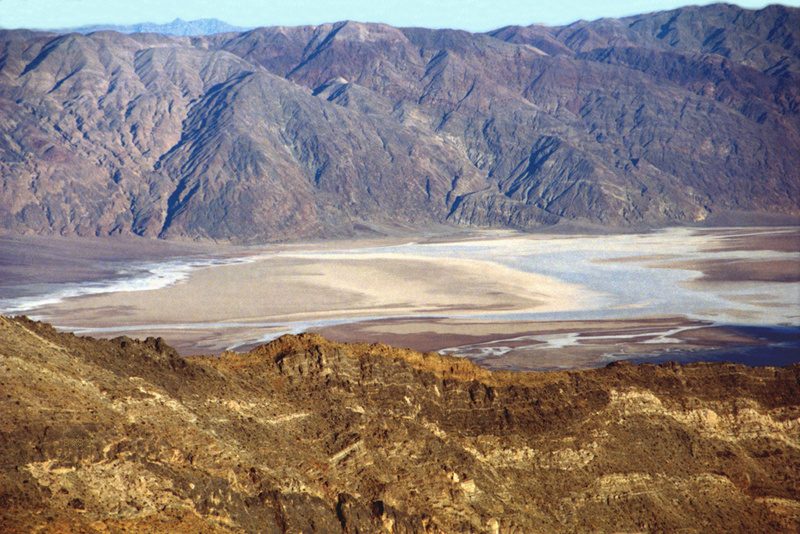
Badwater Basin from Mahogany Flat trail

Hiking Telescope Peak by the normal route involves a 14 miles (23 km) round trip hike. The trail starts in the western part of Death Valley National Park at Mahogany Flat campground. The trail slowly winds itself up to the summit 7 miles (11 km) later at a steady gradient of roughly 8%. The standard route is maintained by the National Park Service, and no permit is required to climb the mountain. This route leaves directly from the Mahogany Flat Campground, and travels approximately two miles to Arcane Meadows. From Arcane Meadows, the trail winds five more miles gradually up toward Telescope Peak, mostly following the ridgeline to the summit. This route can also be used to access two nearby peaks, Bennett Peak and Rogers Peak, a traverse that adds on minimal extra mileage. The last two miles has many switchbacks that are very steep.

An established, but more advanced, climbing route is from Shorty's Well (elevation around −262 feet (−80 m)) to the summit of Telescope Peak at 11,049 feet (3,368 m). This route is approximately 30 to 34 miles round trip and provides a net gain of elevation of approximately 11,311 feet (3,448 m). The route begins at the intersection of the West Side Road and the Hanaupah Canyon Road. For 6.5 miles, the route climbs out of the Badwater Basin and into Hanaupah Canyon. Approximately 1.5 miles after reaching the end of the road, the trail leads directly to Hanaupah Spring, a seasonal water source that may not be available year-round. At the spring, the route then turns directly north (right) onto a scree/talus slope. Although this slope may look difficult to ascend, this is the correct way. Climbers should find the best route possible up the slope. Once finished climbing the talus slope and reaching the ridgeline, climbers should then follow the ridgeline West to the Telescope Peak summit, which should be readily apparent.

The Shorty's Well to Telescope Peak route can be completed in one day by experienced hikers, and has one of the largest elevation gains that can be obtained up a single summit; it can be descended either via Mahogany Flat or as a round-trip back to Shorty's Well.

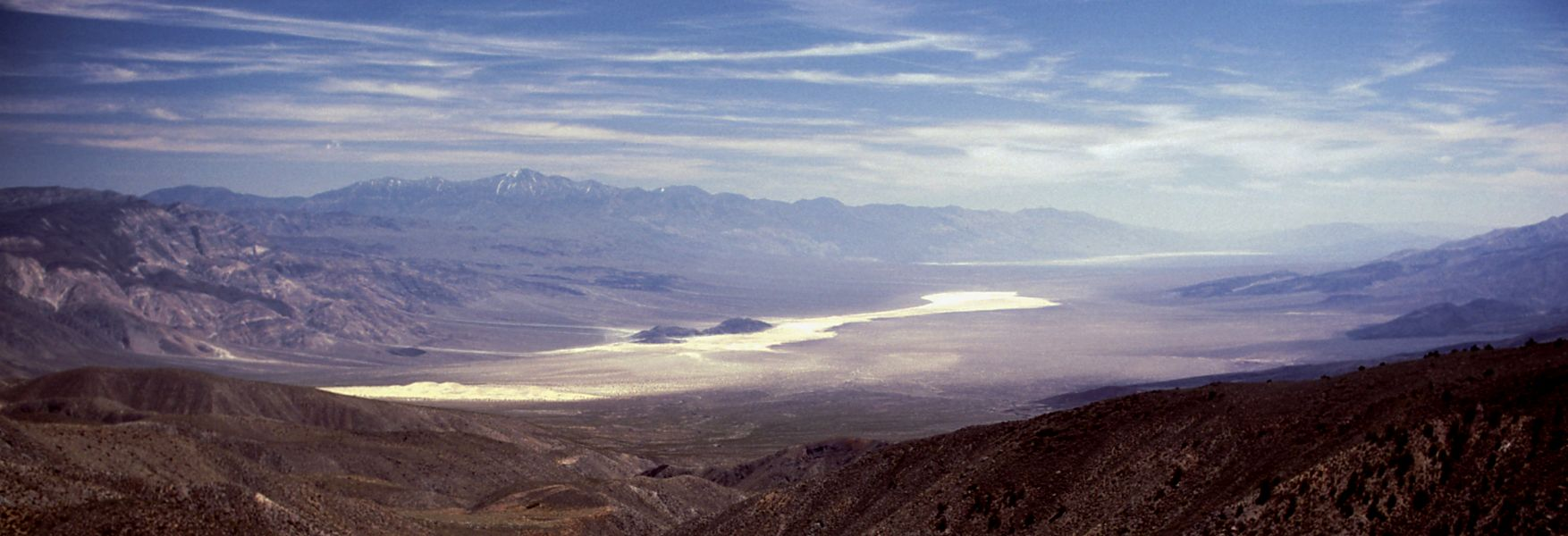
Panamint Valley, California looking south with Telescope Peak at left

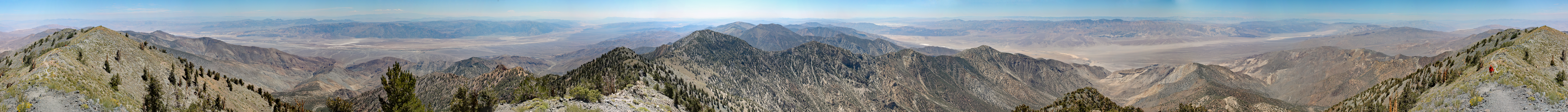
A 360° panorama from the summit of Telescope Peak, with Death Valley at left and Panamint Valley at right

== See also ==
- List of mountain peaks of California
- List of Ultras of the United States
- List of U.S. National Parks by elevation
