= Bennett-Arcane Long Camp =

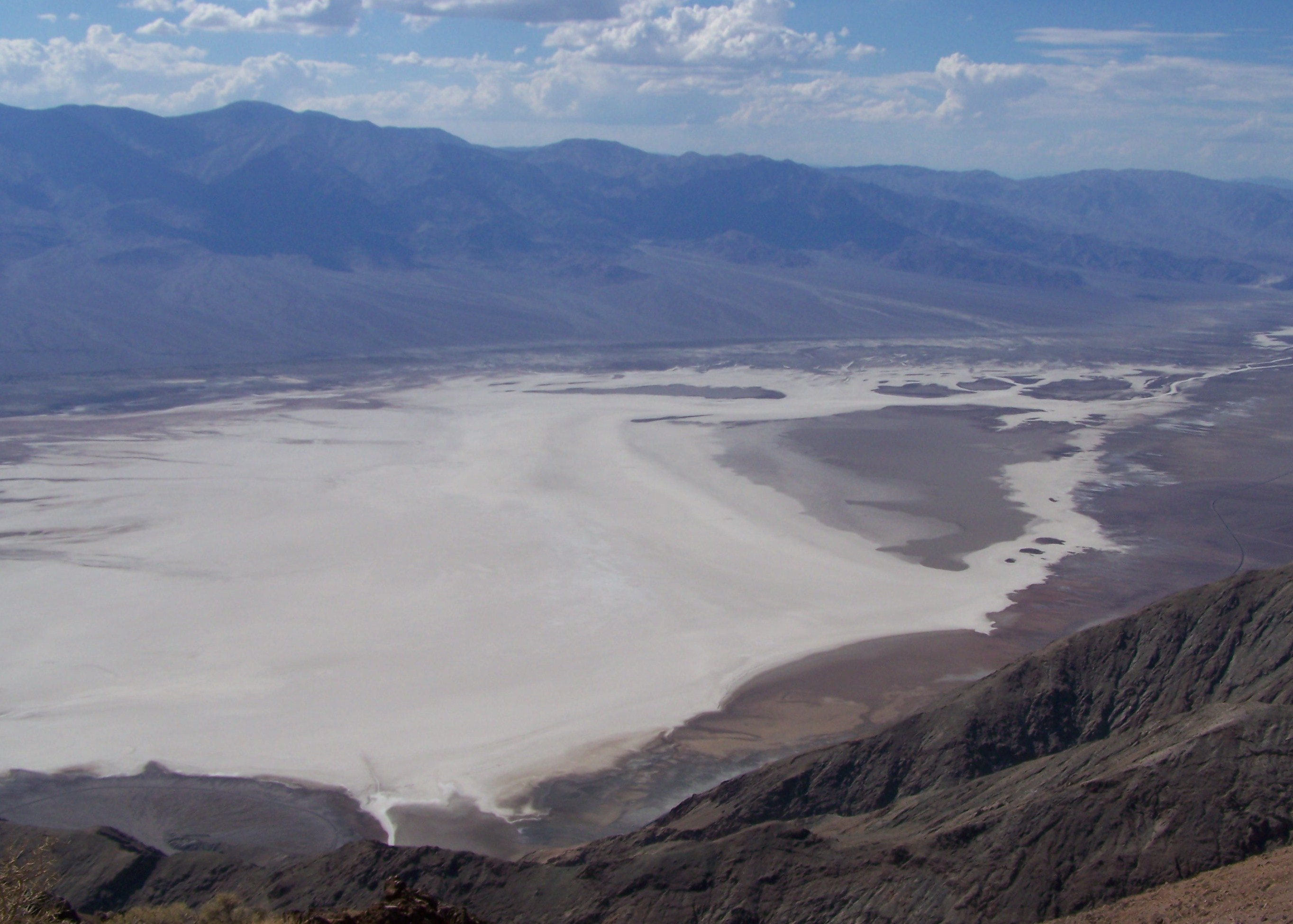
- Badwater Basin. The Bennett-Arcane Long Camp was located at left center in this photo.
- Interactive map of Bennett-Arcane Long Camp
- 36.1634°N 116.863372222222°W
- Location: Badwater Basin, Death Valley

California Historical Landmark
- Official name: Bennett-Arcane Long Camp
- Designated: October 24, 1949
- Reference no.: 444

The Bennett-Arcane Long Camp was a pioneer camp set up in Death Valley in December 1849 by emigrants traveling overland to California during the California gold rush. The site is located in Inyo County just west of Badwater Basin in present-day Death Valley National Park. Badwater Basin is the lowest point in North America at a depth of 282 ft (86 m) below sea level. The Bennett-Arcane party made camp there after splitting off from a larger wagon train known as the Death Valley '49ers, who had departed Salt Lake City two months earlier on a southern route to California, where they planned to settle and prospect in the Sutter's Fort area of the Central Valley and the Sierra Nevada. The wagon train crossed the Great Basin Desert through what is now Utah and Nevada but became lost in the harsh desert and ended up trapped in Death Valley. Several of the pioneers eventually found a route out of the valley and returned to the camp with much-needed supplies, and the survivors then crossed the Mojave Desert into Southern California in February 1850 before proceeding north to the Gold Country. According to some accounts, the Bennett-Arcane party coined the name "Death Valley" after their ordeal.

By December 1849, the Death Valley '49ers had been traveling through the desolate Great Basin Desert for more than two months; their southern route, by which the emigrants hoped to bypass the Sierra Nevada and make progress during the winter months, was relatively new and difficult to follow, and food and water sources were scarce. The original group of more than 100 wagons had already deviated from the intended path several times, and disagreements about the route were so frequent that several smaller factions had left the main party to pursue their own routes and travel at their own pace. In addition, the emigrants were suffering from poor health and low provisions; several had already died. Wagons and equipment were in constant need of repair, and many of the draft animals had died or been slaughtered for food. Stops were frequent and progress was slow.

After the main party descended into Death Valley, they found themselves unable to continue over the Panamint Range. Repeated attempts to find a feasible wagon route through the mountains and out of the valley were unsuccessful. Mistakenly believing they had reached the southern edge of the Sierra Nevada and therefore that the ranchos of Southern California were much closer than they actually were, two of the party's leaders, John Haney Rogers and William Lewis Manly, resolved to travel the remaining distance on foot; they ended up walking more than 250 miles across the Mojave Desert to Rancho San Fernando near Los Angeles, California, where they received food and horses from Mexican villagers to bring back to the pioneers they had left in Death Valley. Miraculously, only one member of the party had died during the month they had spent waiting for rescue. Re-supplied, the survivors then traveled to Rancho San Francisco by Rogers and Manly's route, where they arrived in February 1850.

The group had split up in the valley; the other group was the Jayhawkers, who stayed with their original plan of traveling west out of the valley. Both groups were stuck in the valley for a month and both were saved from dying of thirst by a snowstorm.

== California Historical Landmark ==
California Historical Landmark No. 444 was erected in 1949 by the California Centennials Commission and the Death Valley ‘49ers non-profit organization to commemorate the episode. The marker is located at 36°09′48.3″N 116°51′48.1″W on West Side Road, west of Badwater, in Death Valley National Park. It reads:

NO. 444 BENNETT-ARCANE LONG CAMP - Near this spot the Bennett-Arcane contingent of the Death Valley '49ers, emigrants from the Midwest, seeking a shortcut to California gold fields, were stranded for a month and almost perished from starvation. William Lewis Manley and John Rogers, young members of the party, made a heroic journey on foot to San Fernando and, returning with supplies, led the party to the safety of San Francisquito Rancho near Newhall.

== See also ==
- California Historical Landmarks in Inyo County
- History of California through 1899
