= Harry Wade Exit Route =

California Historic Landmark

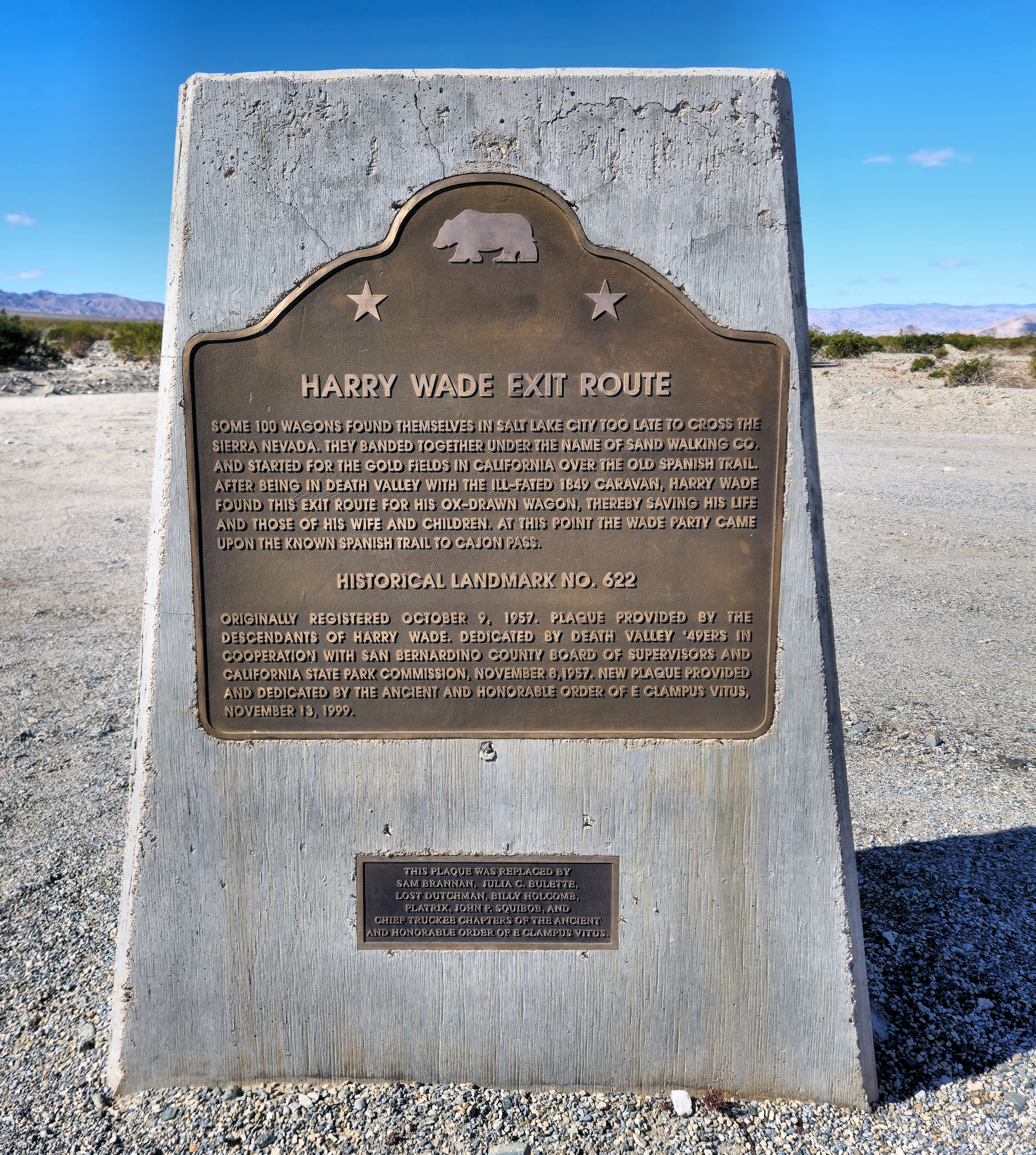
- Harry Wade Exit Marker

- Location within California
- 35°37′59″N 116°17′27″W
- Location: Baker, California

History
- Built: 1849

California Historical Landmark
- Designated: October 9, 1957
- Reference no.: 622

The Harry Wade Exit Route is a route (now a dirt road) in Death Valley. It was discovered and made by Harry Wade from Illinois in 1849. Harry Wade, his wife and children were in the Bennett-Arcan party caravan emigrating west. At the direction of guide Jefferson Hunt, the caravan took a poorly planned turn and descended into Death Valley, California, while looking for a shortcut off the Old Spanish Trail. The caravan of 100 wagons was looking for the shortcut to get to the California Gold Rush sooner. Several in the group died while there, affording the valley its namesake. Harry Wade found a path out of the Valley; the trail he made is today called the Harry Wade Road, a dirt road. After departing Death Valley, Wade found the Old Spanish Trail and came to Southern California though the Cajon Pass. Many in the party also suffered but nonetheless made it out of Death Valley. The Harry Wade Exit Route was designated a California Historic Landmark (No. 622) on October 9, 1957. A marker was placed about 30 miles north of Baker, California, on the Harry Wade Exit Route, to designate where his family escaped. The marker is at the southern end of Death Valley National Park.

Harry Wade was born on March 16, 1800, in Rochester, England. He married Mary Reynolds Leach, who was born on June 17, 1813, in London, England. In 1836, he migrated to the United States and settled in Tioga County, Pennsylvania. After surviving the move to California, they moved to Northern California and ran an inn called The American House in Alviso, California. He died on October 13, 1883, in Alviso. Mary died on May 3, 1889, in Alviso.

== Death Valley '49ers ==
Harry Wade was part of what would become known as the Death Valley '49ers. This was a group of pioneers from the Eastern United States that endured a long and difficult journey during the late-1840s California Gold Rush to prospect in the Sutter's Fort area of the Central Valley and Sierra Nevada in California. Their route from Utah went through the Great Basin Desert in Nevada, and Death Valley and the Mojave Desert in Southern California, in attempting to reach the Gold Country.

== Marker ==
The marker at the site (about 30 miles north of Baker) reads:

NO. 622 HARRY WADE EXIT ROUTE – After getting to Death Valley with the ill-fated 1849 caravan, Harry Wade found this exit route for his ox-drawn wagon and thereby saved his life and the lives of his wife and children. At this point the Wade party came upon the known Spanish Trail to Cajón Pass.

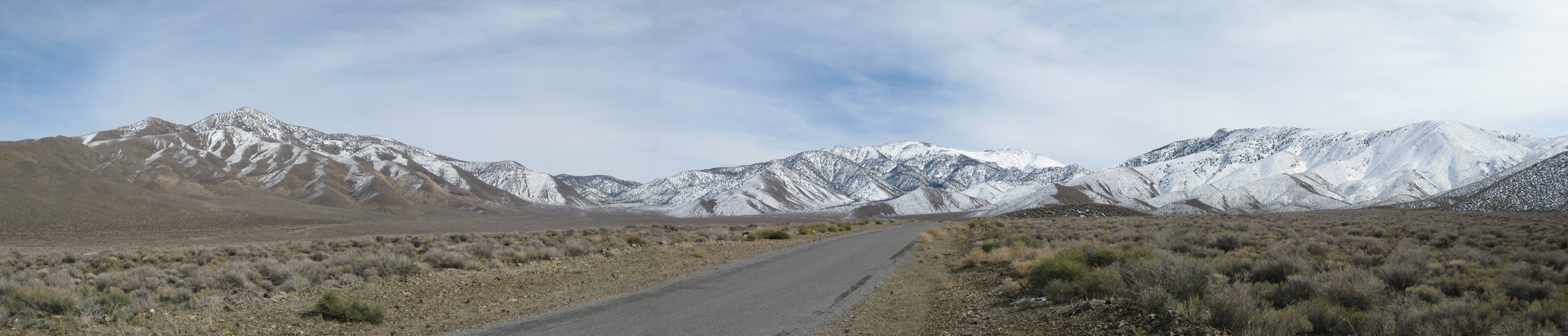
Telescope and Wildrose Peaks from Emigrant Canyon Road

== See also ==
- Santa Fe And Salt Lake Trail Monument
- Death Valley
- Death Valley National Park
- Geology of the Death Valley area
- Places of interest in the Death Valley area
- History of California through 1899
- William L. Manly
- John Haney Rogers
- History of San Bernardino, California
- California Historical Landmarks in San Bernardino County, California
