= Park Village, California =

Park Village, California may refer to:

- Park Village, El Dorado County, California
- Park Village, Inyo County, California
