= Death Valley Airport =

Death Valley Airport may refer to:

- Furnace Creek Airport, in Death Valley National Park, California, United States (FAA: L06)
- Stovepipe Wells Airport, in Death Valley National Park, California, United States (FAA: L09)
