= Death Valley '49ers =

1849 emigrant party during the California gold rush

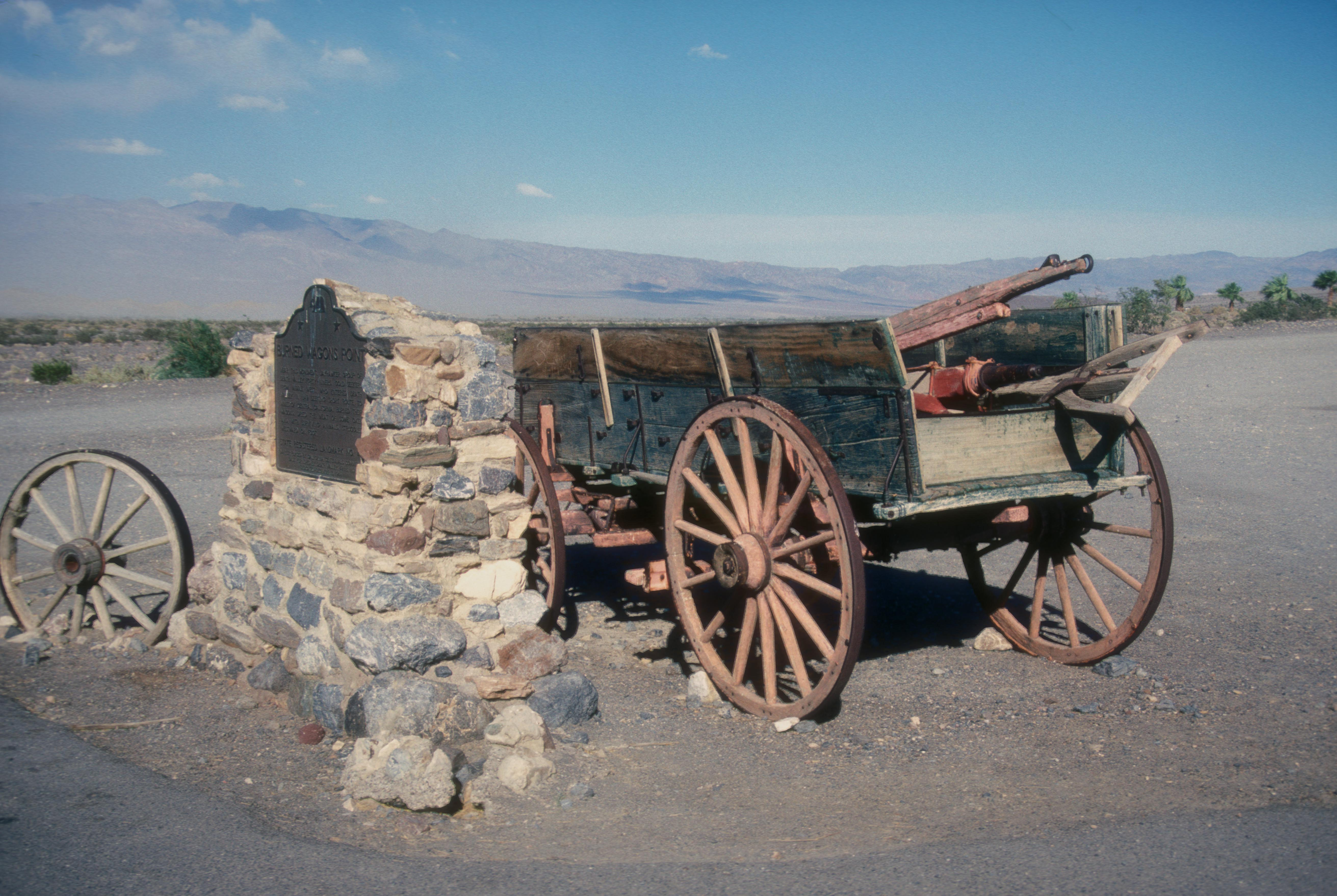
The monument (CHL No. 441) in Burnt Wagons, California, marking the site where the group slaughtered their oxen and burned their wagons

The Death Valley '49ers were a group of American pioneers that endured a long and difficult journey through the Great Basin Desert and the Mojave Desert during the California gold rush. Departing from Hobble Creek near present-day Provo, Utah on October 1, 1849, most of the pioneers finally arrived in Rancho San Francisco on February 4, 1850.

== Background ==
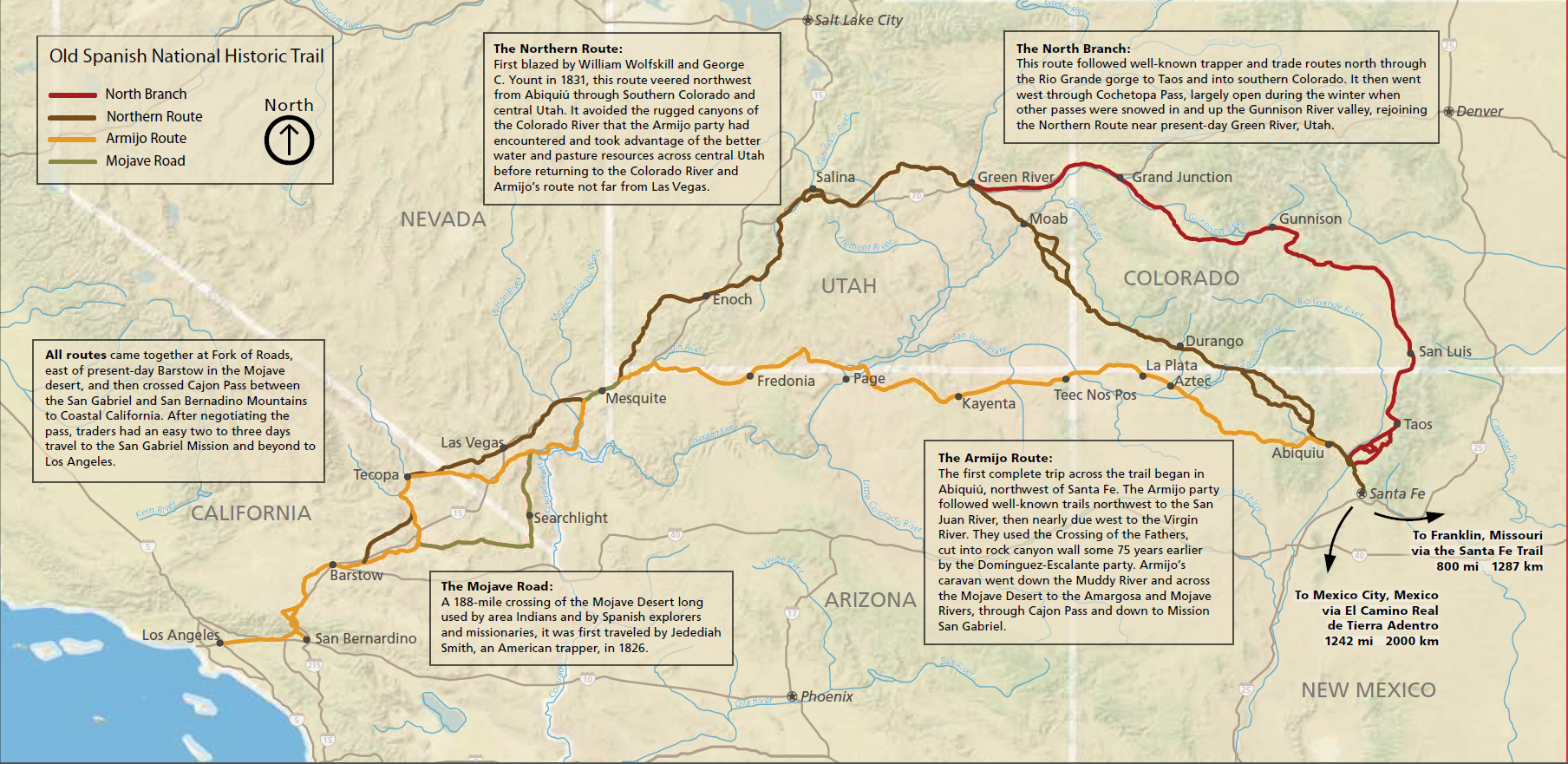
Old Spanish Trail route

On January 24, 1848, James W. Marshall and his crew found gold at Sutter's Mill in Coloma, California. Over the following decade, this discovery would lure tens of thousands of people from the United States and foreign nations in what became known as the California gold rush. People packed their belongings and began to travel by covered wagon to what they hoped would be a new and better life. Because the first great influx of these pioneers began in 1849, they are often referred to as '49ers.

However, the experience of the Donner Party pioneers had provided a sobering lesson after their own misadventures during their overland trip to California in 1846–1847. They had started too late in the year, and also elected to follow the Hastings Cutoff, a new and slower route across the desolate Great Salt Lake Desert of Utah. They reached the Sierra Nevada late in the fall of 1846, where an early winter snowstorm trapped them in the mountains, resulting in an infamous disaster in which dozens of people died from starvation and exposure.

The stories of the Donner Party made national headlines and were still fresh in emigrants' minds when a group of wagons arrived at Salt Lake City and organized in early fall 1849. This was too late in the season to reach and cross the Sierra Nevada without risk of being similarly trapped, so it appeared the group would have to wait out the winter in Salt Lake City. They then heard about the Old Spanish Trail, a route that went around the south end of the Sierra and was reputedly safe to travel in the winter. It was not certain if wagons could navigate the route, but some had recently headed for the trail to try, so the group found a guide by the name of Jefferson Hunt who had previously traveled the route in 1847 and agreed to lead them. These individuals would become part of a story of human suffering in a place which they named Death Valley.

== Departing Hobble Creek ==
Selected key locations along the route of the Death Valley '49ers:
- Waypoints
- False starts
- Parties split
1 Oct 1, 1849 – departs from Hobble Creek (Provo UT)
2 Oct 18–21 – false shortcut along Beaver R. (to Minersville UT)
3 Oct 27 – return to southern route at Little Salt Lake
4 Nov 3–4 – most proceed west (from Enterprise UT); Hunt continues south (towards Mesquite NV) with 7 wagons
5 Walker Pass (planned shortcut destination)
6 Owens Lake (possible planned shortcut destination)
7 Jayhawkers proceed west, Bennett-Arcane proceed south (from Groom Lake)
8 Dec 24 – reunion and division at Ash Meadows / Furnace Creek
9 Jayhawkers: Burnt Wagons
10 Bennett-Arcane: Long Camp

No contemporary sources record the number of people to depart with the expedition, though a 1913 newspaper article states that “Nearly 290 people were in the party at the beginning.” The 107 wagons that would start the journey were scattered about the Salt Lake City area. Hunt advised the wagon train to organize into seven divisions, each led by a captain, with Hunt in overall command. Each division would spend a day leading the rest of the group, establishing the road and preparing the way for the rest, then falling to the rear the next day. With seven divisions, each would lead the journey once a week. Hunt instructed the group to wait a few more days before departing so that cooler weather would prevail during the group’s trek through the desert. The group's constitution was drafted and accepted on September 30, 1849, and they departed Hobble Creek on October 4.

The first several days of travel from their gathering point at Hobble Creek (near present-day Provo, Utah) went well. This portion of the route closely follows the present course of Interstate 15 to reach the Old Spanish Trail, near present-day Parowan. The group reached the Sevier River on October 9. After some delays due to illness and tribunals, the group arrived at the Beaver River on October 18.

Though he had never traveled this portion of the route before, Hunt led the party west down the Beaver River to a location near present-day Minersville, Utah, where they camped for two nights to rest and prepare for a long stretch with no water. The group then turned south on October 21, traveling 12 mi (19 km) before making a dry camp. Hunt assumed that he would come across Coal Creek (near present-day Cedar City), where the group could rest. However, Hunt continued southwest across the Escalante Desert without locating a water source; while the group waited, they ended up driving their stock back to the river for water. Hunt ultimately failed to find water, nearly dying from thirst during the attempt, and the party ended up turning back.

== The group splits up ==
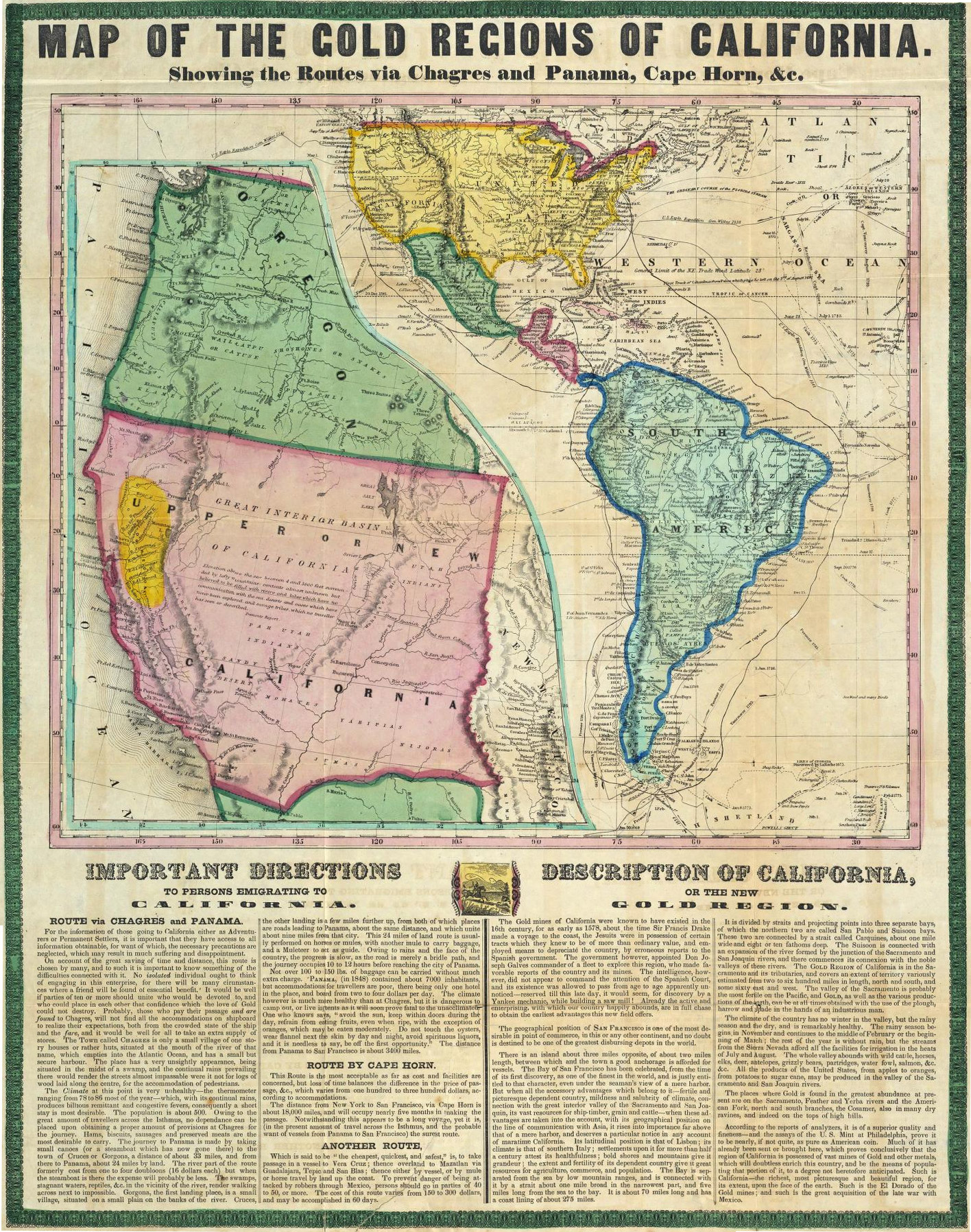
1849 map depicting the Spanish Trail and Walker Pass

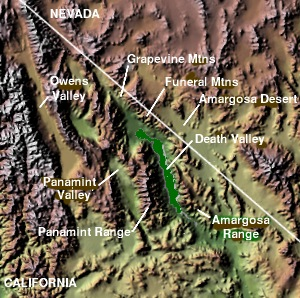
Topographic map of Death Valley

The group's patience and confidence in Hunt was diminished by the gaffe at the Beaver River. While they were in camp recovering, a pack train led by Orson K. Smith and Charles C. Rich rode in on October 22 and temporarily joined the larger group. Smith showed a map made by Elijah Barney Ward, a former trapper who had trailed stolen horses from California over Walker Pass, which showed a route west across the Escalante Desert to Walker Pass. According to an alternate account, a map had been shown by Mr. Williams while the group was still in Salt Lake City; the Williams cutoff led to Owens Lake in present-day Inyo County, California, and at least one group had a copy of the Williams map. Yet another alternate account stated the map was a copy of one made by John C. Frémont during his military campaign in 1845. After backtracking, the group continued down what is now the Interstate 15 corridor over the difficult Beaver Ridge to the Parowan Valley, where they camped near Little Salt Lake on October 27. The attempted shortcut had cost them seven days, which strained their provisions for the rest of the trip. In addition, the sheer size of the group exceeded the capacity of the desert watering holes and pasturelands along the route. Part of the group, led by Rich and Francis Pomeroy, broke off on October 28 to follow the Ward route. Rich's group later reunited with Hunt on November 18.

After Smith and the pack train had left with Ward's map, intending to take the trail themselves, discussion continued. Everyone agreed that the Ward route would shorten their journey by 500 mi (800 km), so most of the 107 wagons decided to follow Smith's pack train. The party proceeded to a point near present-day Enterprise, Utah in early November. At that point, most of the group continued west while a small group turned south to follow the Old Spanish Trail with Hunt. The Jefferson Hunt Monument was constructed south of present-day Newcastle, Utah, to commemorate this historic split. According to several accounts, just seven wagons followed Hunt south. Those that continued west on Ward's route soon found themselves confronted with the precipitous obstacle of Beaver Dam Wash, described as a gaping canyon on the present-day Utah–Nevada state line with 1,000 ft-high (300 m) cliff walls. Smith and the pack train had been able to traverse the canyon on foot and hoof, but the wagons could not. The combination of the sheer wall and tough foraging led some to nickname the place "Mount Misery" or "Poverty Point".

Most of the party became discouraged and followed Mr. Rynierson back to join Hunt on November 7, though 27 wagons decided to continue on through the wash. The larger portion reunited with Hunt on December 22. Despite their lack of a reliable map, the smaller group decided to continue, believing they would find the pass if they simply continued westward. A new leader was elected, Jim Martin, and the group continued north to find a way around the canyon. After William L. Manly discovered they were backtracking north towards Salt Lake City while he was serving as an advance scout, he convinced Martin to turn west. The Martin group was overtaken by a separate all-male group of pioneers calling themselves the “Jayhawkers”, (Note: The "Jayhawkers" were one of the seven original divisions that had set out with Hunt, but that division, led by William Goddard, split from the larger group soon after the debacle on the Beaver River. They were originally from Galesburg, Illinois and decided to exclude women and children from their party; the Bennett-Arcane party were two families that were originally part of the Jayhawkers prior to the exclusion order. The other divisions had chosen similarly colorful names for themselves, including "San Joaquin" (a.k.a. "Sand Walking"), "Bug Smashers", "Buckskins" (led by Cephas Arms), "Hawkeyes", and "Wolverines".) who continued north but later turned west and joined the Martin group. It took several days to find a route for the wagons around the canyon, after which the group passed through the area of present-day Panaca, Nevada, and crossed over "Bennetts Pass" to the Del Mar Valley. There they started having difficulty finding water but eventually found their way to Crystal Springs in the Pahranagat Valley. The oxen grew weak from lack of nourishment and water, and the pioneers began discarding treasured items in late November, approximately 90 mi (140 km) west of "Mount Misery" near present-day Hiko. They continued over Hancock Summit into Tikaboo Valley and then on to Groom Lake (now encompassed by Area 51) where they rested and took water.

== Second split and Death Valley days ==
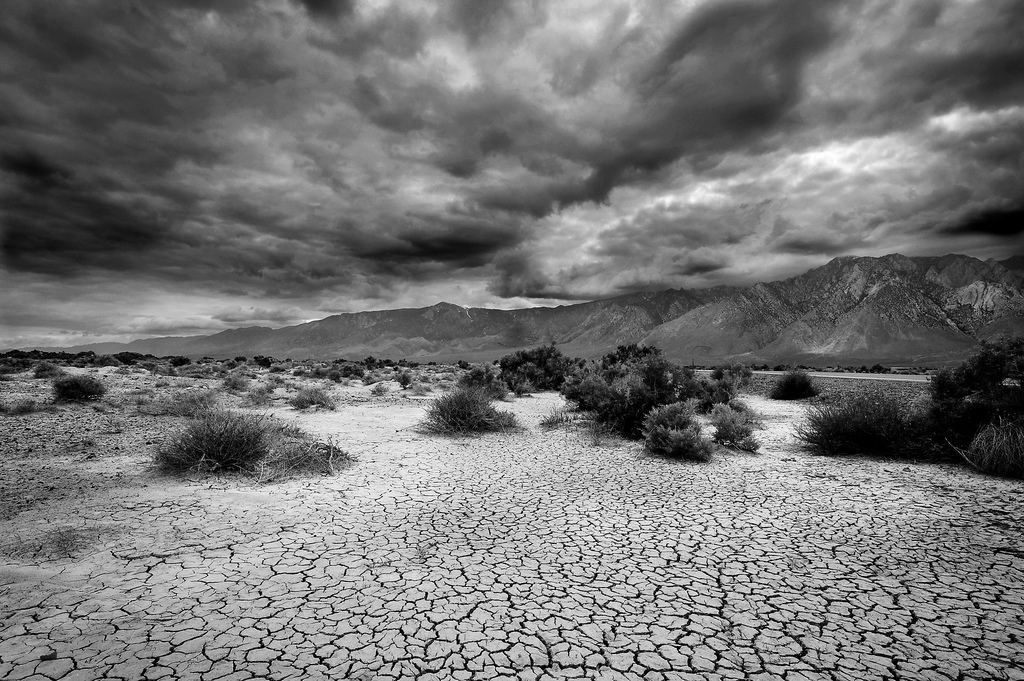
Death Valley Gateway (CHL No. 442), with the Panamint Range in the background

At Groom Lake they again began to dispute which direction to travel. One group, the Bennett-Arcane party, wanted to head south toward the distant, snow-clad Mount Charleston in hopes of finding a good water source, based on Manly's scouting. The other group, the Jayhawkers, wanted to stay with the original plan of traveling west. The Jayhawkers took 20 wagons, while the Bennett-Arcanes kept 7 and Manly. While split, both groups were saved from dying of thirst by a snowstorm and eventually reunited at Ash Meadows in the Amargosa Desert of the Amargosa Valley, east of Death Valley. From here they continued on, following the Amargosa River bed to present-day Death Valley Junction, California, and then along the same route followed by present-day California State Route 190 past the Funeral Mountains.

On Christmas Eve of 1849, the group arrived at Travertine Springs, the west-facing canyon of the Amargosa Range, located about a mile from Furnace Creek Wash in Death Valley. (Note: There is a historical marker for this site: California Historical Landmark No. 442, "Death Valley 49ers Gateway".) The lost pioneers had now been traveling across the desert for about two months since leaving the Old Spanish Trail. Their oxen were weak from lack of forage and their wagons were in poor shape. They too were weary and discouraged but their worst problem was not the valley that lay before them; it was the towering Panamint Range to the west that stood like an impenetrable wall as far as could be seen in both directions.

== Burnt Wagons (Jayhawkers) ==
At Furnace Creek, the groups split again. The Jayhawkers decided to head northwest toward a rough pass ("Towne Pass"), but after discovering it was impassable to wheeled traffic due to strewn boulders, they decided to leave their wagons and belongings behind and walk to civilization. They slaughtered several oxen and used the wood of their wagons to cook the meat and make jerky. The place where they did this is present-day Stovepipe Wells, (Note: There is a historical marker for this site: California Historical Landmark No. 441, "Burned Wagons Point".) and is located near the Mesquite Flat Sand Dunes. From here, they began climbing toward Towne Pass and then turned south over Emigrant Pass to Wildrose Canyon in the Panamint Range. After crossing the mountains and descending into Panamint Valley, they turned south and climbed a small pass into Searles Valley before making their way into Indian Wells Valley (near present-day Ridgecrest). It was here that they finally got their first look at the Sierra Nevada mountain range. They turned south and traveled across Fremont Valley, close to the route followed by present-day California State Route 14. Ironically, they walked right by Walker Pass, the mountain pass they had set out to look for almost three months earlier.

After traveling past Walker Pass, they entered into what was to become the worst part of their journey, across the Mojave Desert and Antelope Valley. This is a region with very few water sources. Eventually they found their way over a pass in the Sierra Pelona Mountains near present-day Palmdale, and, following the Santa Clara River, were finally discovered and rescued by Mexican cowboys (Californios) from Rancho Ex-Mission San Fernando, located near present-day Santa Clarita Valley. The Jayhawkers arrived at Rancho San Francisco on February 4, 1850; the survivors later held reunions and celebrated annually on that day from 1872 to 1918.

== Long Camp (Bennett-Arcane) ==
Meanwhile, the Bennett-Arcane party attempted to cross the Panamints to the south at Warm Springs Canyon, where Manly had reported seeing a lake, but failed and retreated to the valley floor. At the start of 1850, they dispatched two men, William L. Manly and John Haney Rogers, with two weeks of supplies and US$30 (equivalent to $1,200 in 2025) to purchase relief and return. They mistakenly thought the Panamints were the Sierra Nevada and were expecting a quick return. Instead, Manly and Rogers walked nearly 300 mi (480 km) to Mission San Fernando, purchased supplies, and rode three horses and a one-eyed mule back to rescue the survivors, returning 26 days after they had set out. Incredibly, only one of the Bennett-Arcane party had died during the month-long wait at what is now the Bennett-Arcane Long Camp, (Note: There is a historical marker for this site: California Historical Landmark No. 444, "Bennett-Arcane Long Camp".) although several other survivors had left to find their own way out of Death Valley, including Harry Wade, who blazed a trail out of the valley that is now a dirt road known as Harry Wade Road or the Harry Wade Exit Route. Reportedly, as the last survivors left with Manly and Rogers, someone proclaimed "Goodbye, Death Valley", thus giving the area its name.

== Death Valley '49ers nonprofit ==
A nonprofit organization called the "Death Valley '49ers" was founded in 1949 to commemorate these pioneers with an emphasis on the wagon parties of 1849 and 1850. Each November, the group holds their annual Encampment "to celebrate this pioneer spirit and this special place called Death Valley."

== See also ==
- Death Valley National Park
- Geology of the Death Valley area
- Places of interest in the Death Valley area
- History of California through 1899
- Harry Wade Exit Route, a '49er path out of Death Valley
- Santa Fe And Salt Lake Trail Monument
