= California Historical Landmarks in Inyo County =

This list includes properties and districts listed on the California Historical Landmark listing in Inyo County, California. Click the "Map of all coordinates" link to the right to view a Google map of all properties and districts with latitude and longitude coordinates in the table below.

Image		Landmark name	Location	City or town	Summary
Bend City	209	Bend City	Mazourka Canyon Rd. 36°49′09″N 118°07′50″W	Independence	
Bennett-Arcane Long Camp	444	Bennett-Arcane Long Camp	Death Valley National Park; 36°09′48″N 116°51′48″W		Just west of the Badwater Basin.
Bishop Creek Battleground	811	Bishop Creek Battleground	State Hwy 168 and Bishop Creek Rd. 37°20′29″N 118°28′52″W	Bishop	
Burned Wagons Point	441	Burned Wagons Point	Death Valley National Park; 36°36′24″N 117°08′46″W	Stovepipe Wells	
Camp Independence	349	Camp Independence	Miller Ln. & Salvabell Ln. 36°49′59″N 118°13′21″W	Independence	
Cottonwood Charcoal Kilns	537	Cottonwood Charcoal Kilns	State Hwy 395; 36°24′55″N 118°00′43″W	Cartago	
Death Valley 49ers Gateway	442	Death Valley 49ers Gateway	California Route 190, near Badwater Rd. 36°26′55″N 116°51′10″W	Furnace Creek	
Eichbaum Toll Road	848	Eichbaum Toll Road	Death Valley National Park; 36°36′20″N 117°08′51″W	Stovepipe Wells	
Farley's Olancha Mill Site	796	Farley's Olancha Mill Site	State Hwy 395; 36°16′30″N 118°00′10″W	Olancha	
Furnace of Owens Lake Silver-Lead Company	752	Furnace of Owens Lake Silver-Lead Company	State Hwy 136; 36°31′49″N 117°54′49″W	Keeler	
Grave of 1872 Earthquake Victims	507	Grave of 1872 Earthquake Victims	State Hwy 395; 36°37′06″N 118°04′07″W	Lone Pine	
Laws Station	953	Laws Station	Silver Canyon Rd. 37°24′04″N 118°20′46″W	Bishop	
Manzanar Relocation Center	850	Manzanar Relocation Center	State Hwy 395; 36°43′34″N 118°08′41″W	Independence	Also on the NRHP list as NPS-76000484
Mary Austin's Home	229	Mary Austin's Home	253 Market St. 36°48′06″N 118°12′07″W	Independence	
Mayfield Canyon Battlefield	211	Mayfield Canyon Battlefield	Mayfield Canyon; 37°26′49″N 118°38′14″W	Bishop	
Old Harmony Borax Works	773	Old Harmony Borax Works	Death Valley National Park; 36°28′48″N 116°52′24″W	Furnace Creek	Also on the NRHP list as NPS-74000339
Old Stovepipe Wells	826	Old Stovepipe Wells	Death Valley National Park; 36°39′33″N 117°04′44″W	Stovepipe Wells	
Owensville	230	Owensville	State Hwy 6 & Silver Canyon Rd. 37°23′59″N 118°21′09″W	Bishop	Also called "First Permanent White Habitation in Owens Valley"
Putnam's Stone Cabin	223	Putnam's Stone Cabin	139 Edwards St. 36°48′11″N 118°12′00″W	Independence	
San Francis Ranch	208	San Francis Ranch	Red Hill Rd. & State Hwy 168; 37°21′41″N 118°27′12″W	Bishop	
Valley Wells	443	Valley Wells	Trona Wildrose Rd. & Valley Wells Rd. 35°49′42″N 117°19′54″W	Valley Wells	

== See also ==
- List of California Historical Landmarks
- National Register of Historic Places listings in Inyo County, California
