= Burnt Wagons, California =

Burnt Wagons
- Former settlement
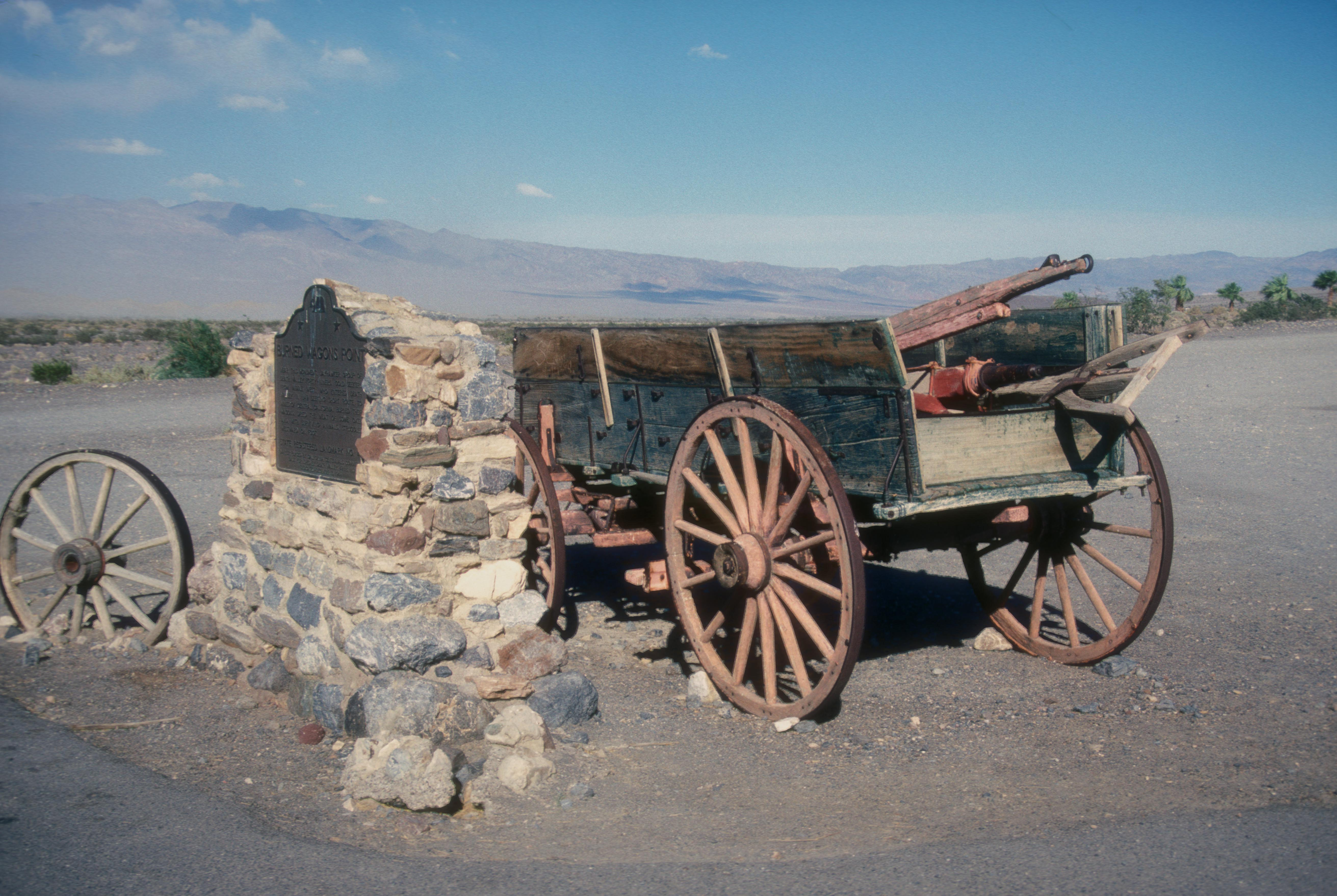
- The Burnt Wagons Monument
- Interactive map of Burnt Wagons
- Coordinates: 36°36′24″N 117°08′46″W
- Country: United States
- State: California
- County: Inyo

California Historical Landmark
- Official name: Burned Wagons Point
- Reference no.: 441

Burnt Wagons is a former settlement in Inyo County, California, United States, near Stovepipe Wells. It was located in Death Valley, 55 miles (89 km) northwest of Death Valley Junction. The name recalls the emigrants of 1849 who abandoned and burnt their wagons at the site. The site is now registered as California Historical Landmark #441. The monument's plaque reads:

BURNED WAGONS POINT

Near this monument, the Jayhawker group of Death Valley Forty-Niners, gold seekers from Middle West, who entered Death Valley in 1849 seeking short route to the mines of central California, burned their wagons, dried the meat of some oxen and, with surviving animals, struggled westward on foot.

STATE REGISTERED LANDMARK NO.441
Marker placed by California Centennials Commission.
Base furnished by Death Valley '49ers, Inc.
Dedicated December 3rd, 1949

== See also ==
- California Historical Landmarks in Inyo County
- History of California through 1899
