= Manly Peak Wilderness =

Protected wilderness area in California, United States

- IUCN category Ib (wilderness area)
- Location within California Location within the United States
- Interactive map of Manly Peak Wilderness
- Location: Inyo County, California, United States
- Coordinates: 35.904465°N 117.137215°W
- Area: 12,908 acres (52.24 km^{2})
- Max. elevation: 7,196 feet (2,193 m)
- Established: 1994
- Governing body: Bureau of Land Management

Manly Peak Wilderness is a Bureau of Land Management wilderness area in Inyo County, California. The area was established in 1994 through the California Desert Protection Act and sits on the border of Death Valley National Park. Manly Peak, named for pioneer William Lewis Manly, dominates the area at a height of 7,196 feet (2,193 m). Creosote bush scrub dominates the lower elevations, changing to piñon-juniper woodlands at higher elevations.
