= Stovepipe Wells, California =

Unincorporated community in California, United States

Stovepipe Wells
- Unincorporated community
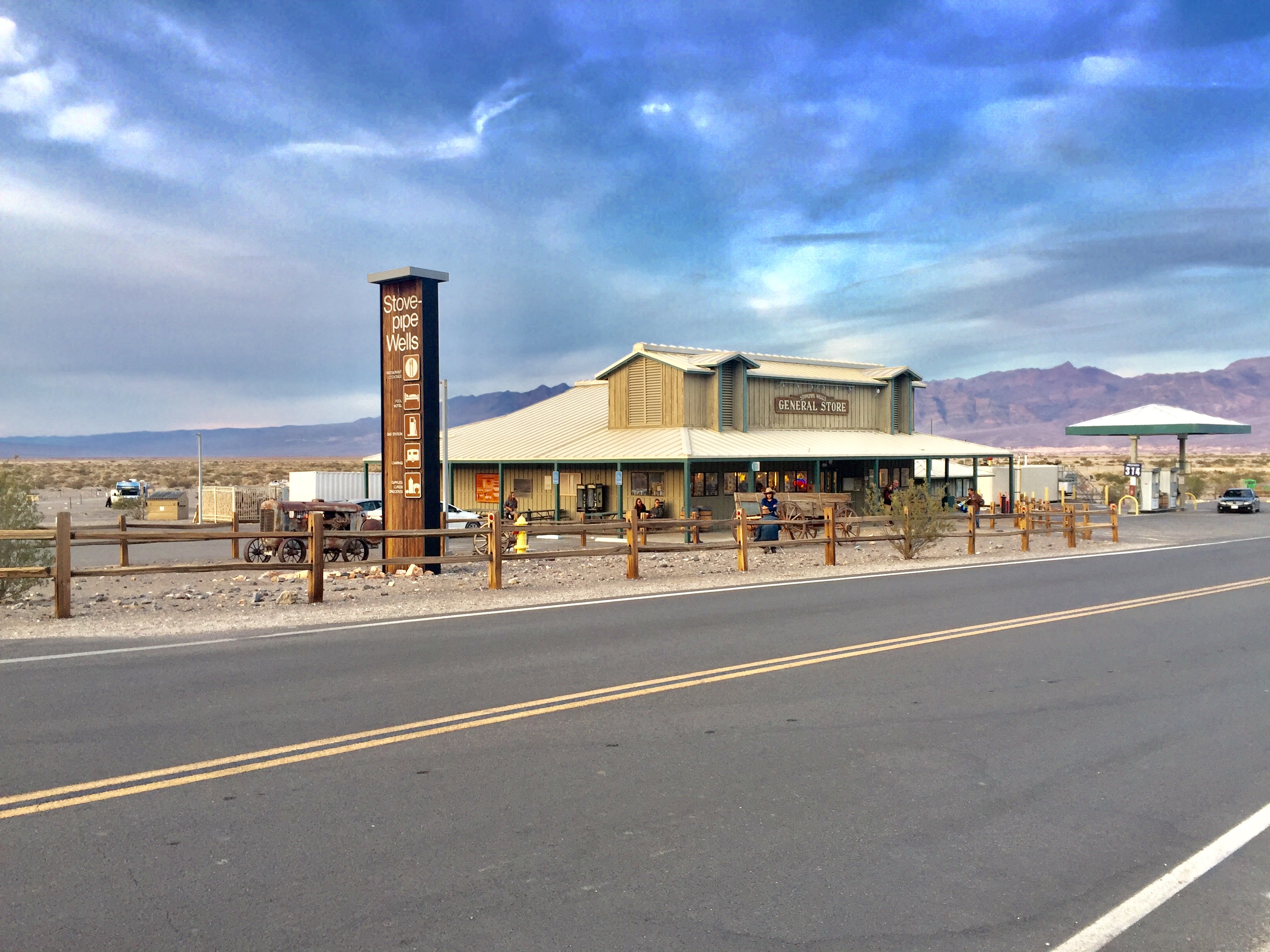
- General store and sign at Stovepipe Wells, December 2017

- Location in California Location within the United States
- Coordinates: 36°36′22″N 117°08′47″W
- Country: United States
- State: California
- County: Inyo
- Elevation: 9.8 ft (3 m)

California Historical Landmark
- Reference no.: 826

Stovepipe Wells is a way-station in the northern part of Death Valley, in unincorporated Inyo County, California, United States.

== Geography and names ==
Stovepipe Wells is located at 36°36′22″N 117°08′47″W and is US Geological Survey (USGS) feature ID 235564. It is entirely inside Death Valley National Park and along State Route 190 (SR 190) at less than 10 feet (3.0 m) above sea level. West on SR 190 is Towne Pass at about 4,950 feet (1,510 m) above sea level. Eventually, the road meets Panamint Valley Road at Panamint Junction in the Panamint Valley. East on SR 190 the road leads to Furnace Creek and Death Valley Junction.

Variant names listed for the Inyo County location by USGS include Stove Pipe Wells Hotel and Stovepipe Wells Hotel. The US Postal Service ZIP Code is 92328, and the locale name is spelled Stove Pipe Wells in some postal renditions. It is commonly referred to as Stovepipe Wells Village.

=== Climate ===
According to the Köppen Climate Classification system, Stovepipe Wells has a hot desert climate, abbreviated "BWh" on climate maps. Its average high temperature is greater than 100 °F (37.8 °C) from June through September.

Climate data for Stovepipe Wells, California, 1991–2020 normals, extremes 2004–present
Month	Jan	Feb	Mar	Apr	May	Jun	Jul	Aug	Sep	Oct	Nov	Dec	Year
Record high °F (°C)	83 (28)	90 (32)	100 (38)	110 (43)	118 (48)	126 (52)	129 (54)	126 (52)	122 (50)	110 (43)	94 (34)	82 (28)	129 (54)
Mean maximum °F (°C)	76.3 (24.6)	83.4 (28.6)	93.0 (33.9)	104.1 (40.1)	112.1 (44.5)	120.7 (49.3)	123.1 (50.6)	120.1 (48.9)	115.6 (46.4)	102.6 (39.2)	89.1 (31.7)	74.1 (23.4)	123.7 (50.9)
Mean daily maximum °F (°C)	65.0 (18.3)	70.6 (21.4)	79.3 (26.3)	88.1 (31.2)	98.4 (36.9)	108.6 (42.6)	114.9 (46.1)	113.0 (45.0)	104.5 (40.3)	89.1 (31.7)	73.6 (23.1)	62.6 (17.0)	89.0 (31.7)
Daily mean °F (°C)	53.6 (12.0)	59.7 (15.4)	68.1 (20.1)	76.1 (24.5)	85.8 (29.9)	95.7 (35.4)	102.3 (39.1)	100.1 (37.8)	91.8 (33.2)	76.9 (24.9)	62.1 (16.7)	51.8 (11.0)	77.0 (25.0)
Mean daily minimum °F (°C)	42.2 (5.7)	48.8 (9.3)	56.8 (13.8)	64.1 (17.8)	73.3 (22.9)	82.7 (28.2)	89.8 (32.1)	87.3 (30.7)	79.0 (26.1)	64.7 (18.2)	50.6 (10.3)	41.0 (5.0)	65.0 (18.3)
Mean minimum °F (°C)	31.9 (−0.1)	37.7 (3.2)	45.9 (7.7)	53.7 (12.1)	61.2 (16.2)	71.7 (22.1)	81.1 (27.3)	78.6 (25.9)	67.7 (19.8)	52.9 (11.6)	39.0 (3.9)	32.3 (0.2)	30.9 (−0.6)
Record low °F (°C)	25 (−4)	29 (−2)	40 (4)	47 (8)	58 (14)	66 (19)	76 (24)	72 (22)	60 (16)	38 (3)	32 (0)	28 (−2)	25 (−4)
Average precipitation inches (mm)	0.23 (5.8)	0.55 (14)	0.21 (5.3)	0.11 (2.8)	0.10 (2.5)	0.04 (1.0)	0.23 (5.8)	0.12 (3.0)	0.04 (1.0)	0.09 (2.3)	0.09 (2.3)	0.14 (3.6)	1.95 (49.4)
Average precipitation days (≥ 0.01 in)	3.2	3.2	2.7	1.5	3.3	1.4	1.6	0.9	0.8	1.4	0.8	2.1	22.9
Source 1: NOAA
Source 2: National Weather Service (mean maxima/minima 2006–2020)

== History ==
The first temporary settlement at Stovepipe Wells came into being when a road between Rhyolite and Skidoo was begun in 1906 to ameliorate the approach to the mine at Skidoo. A collection of tents was erected to serve travelers with food, drink and lodging. During the bonanza days of Rhyolite and Skidoo, it was the only known water source on the Cross-Valley road. When sand obscured the spot, a length of stovepipe was inserted as a marker; hence, its unique name.

In 1925, entrepreneur Bob Eichmann began construction of the hotel at Stovepipe Wells, along with a scenic toll road through Death Valley. This marked the beginning of the transition from mining community to tourist destination.

The settlement is now registered as California Historical Landmark #826.

== Facilities ==
Stovepipe Wells Village is home to the Stovepipe Wells Hotel, a full-service hotel with swimming pool. A general store offers sundries and food and is adjacent to a gas station. Stovepipe Wells Village also houses the Badwater Saloon and Toll Road restaurant, The Nugget Gift Shop and a ranger station.

The default format for wired telephone numbers in the community is in the Death Valley exchange: (760) 786-xxxx. The community had manual telephone service until the late 1980s.

The community is contained within the Great Basin Unified Air Pollution Control District.

== Nearby features ==
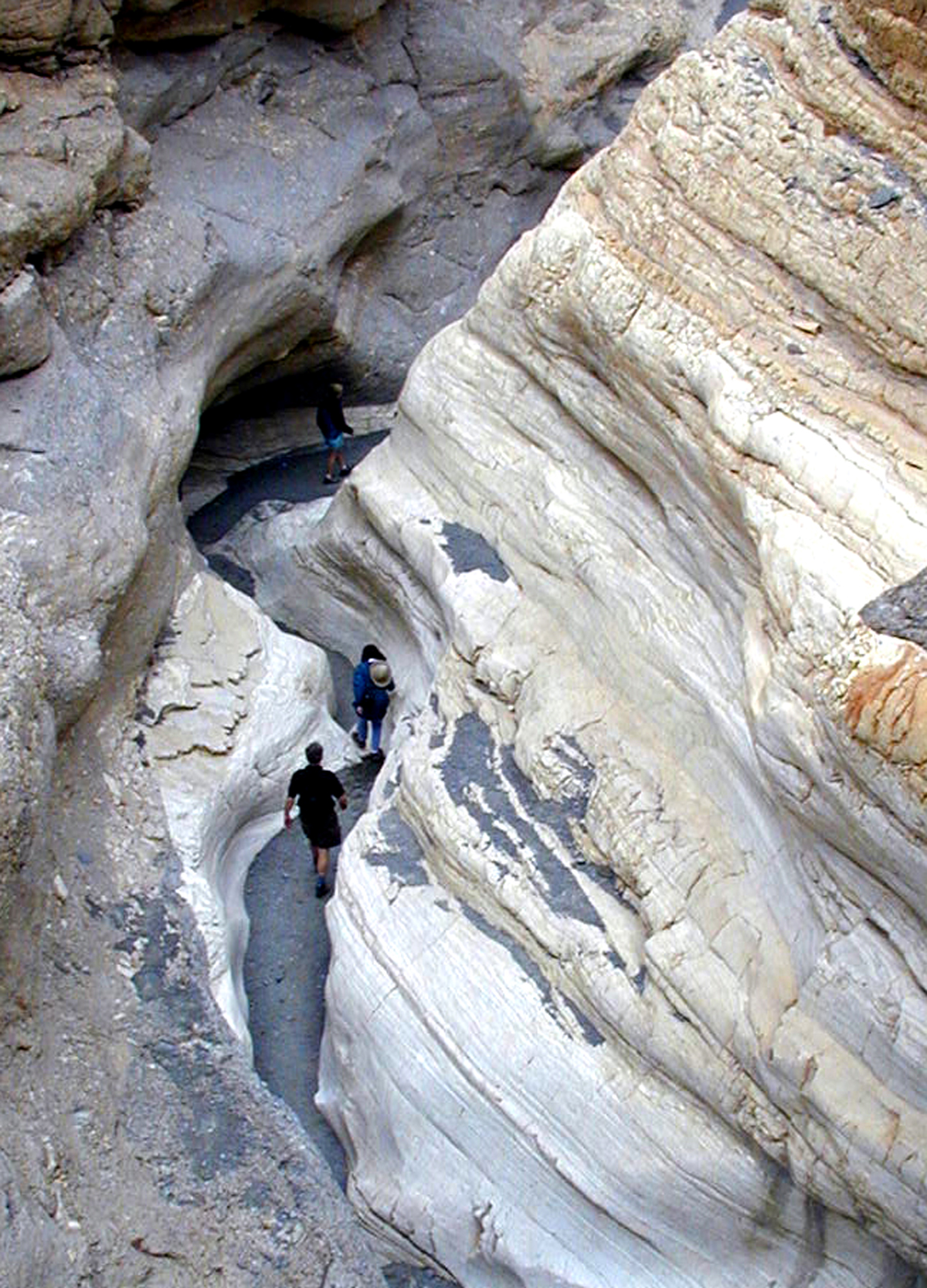
Hikers walk through the narrows of Stovepipe Wells's Mosaic Canyon

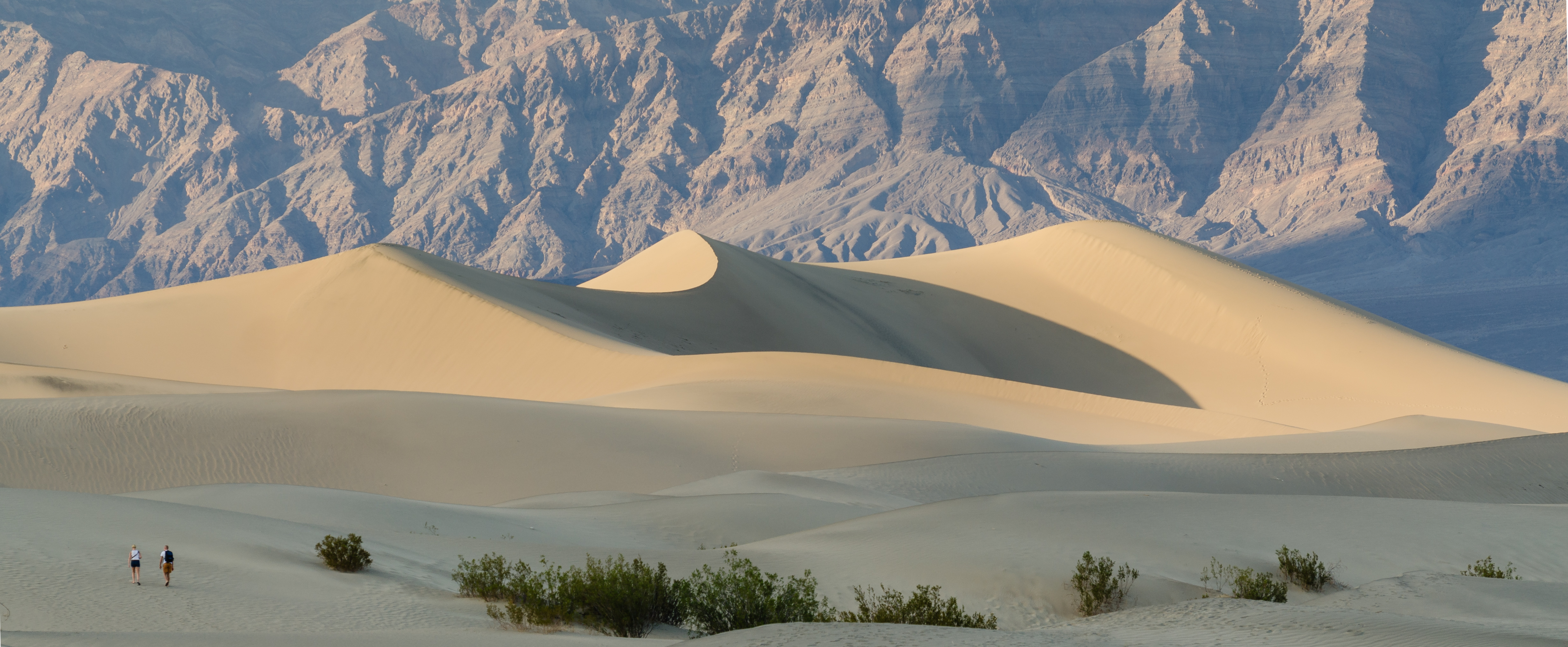
Stovepipe Wells's Mesquite Flat Sand Dunes

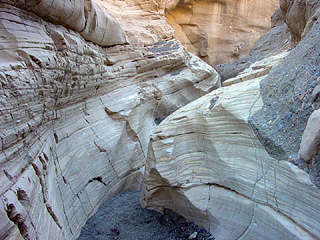
Late Precambrian Noonday Formation scoured in Stovepipe Wells's Mosaic Canyon by episodic flow. (USGS photo)

- Close to town are some fairly large and accessible stationary sand dunes on the floor of Death Valley. The dunes are roughly 7 miles (11 km) long in the east–west axis. They are located in the space between Salt Creek and Emigrant Wash.
- Stovepipe Well, for which the community is named, is shown to the northeast at 36°39′33″N 117°04′44″W.
- Stovepipe Wells Airport is to the southwest at 36°36′14″N 117°09′33″W. The airport has an identifier of L09 and features a 3,250-foot (990 m) paved runway.
- Stovepipe Wells Campground
- Stovepipe Wells Ranger Station
- Mesquite Flat Sand Dunes
- Mosaic Canyon
- Tucki Mountain
- Grotto Canyon
- Devil's Corn Field

== California Historical Landmarks ==
There are three California Historical Landmarks in Stovepipe Wells.

California Historical Landmark number 441, Burned Wagons Point, registered on October 24, 1949, reads:

NO. 441 BURNED WAGONS POINT - Near this monument, the Jayhawker group of Death Valley '49ers, gold seekers from the Middle West who entered Death Valley in 1849 seeking a short route to the mines of central California, burned their wagons, dried the meat of some oxen and, with surviving animals, struggled westward on foot.

California Historical Landmark number 826, Old Stovepipe Wells, registered on August 7, 1968, reads:

NO. 826 OLD STOVEPIPE WELLS - This waterhole, the only one in the sand dune area of Death Valley, was at the junction of the two Indian trails. During the bonanza days of Rhyolite and Skidoo, it was the only known water source on the cross-valley road. When sand obscured the spot, a length of stovepipe was inserted as a marker.

California Historical Landmark number 848, Eichbaum Toll Road, registered on May 19, 1971, reads:

NO. 848 EICHBAUM TOLL ROAD - In 1926, H. W. Eichbaum obtained a franchise for a toll road from Darwin Falls to Stovepipe Wells, the first maintained road into Death Valley from the west. It changed the area's economic base from mining to tourism and brought about the creation of Death Valley National Monument seven years later

== Gallery ==
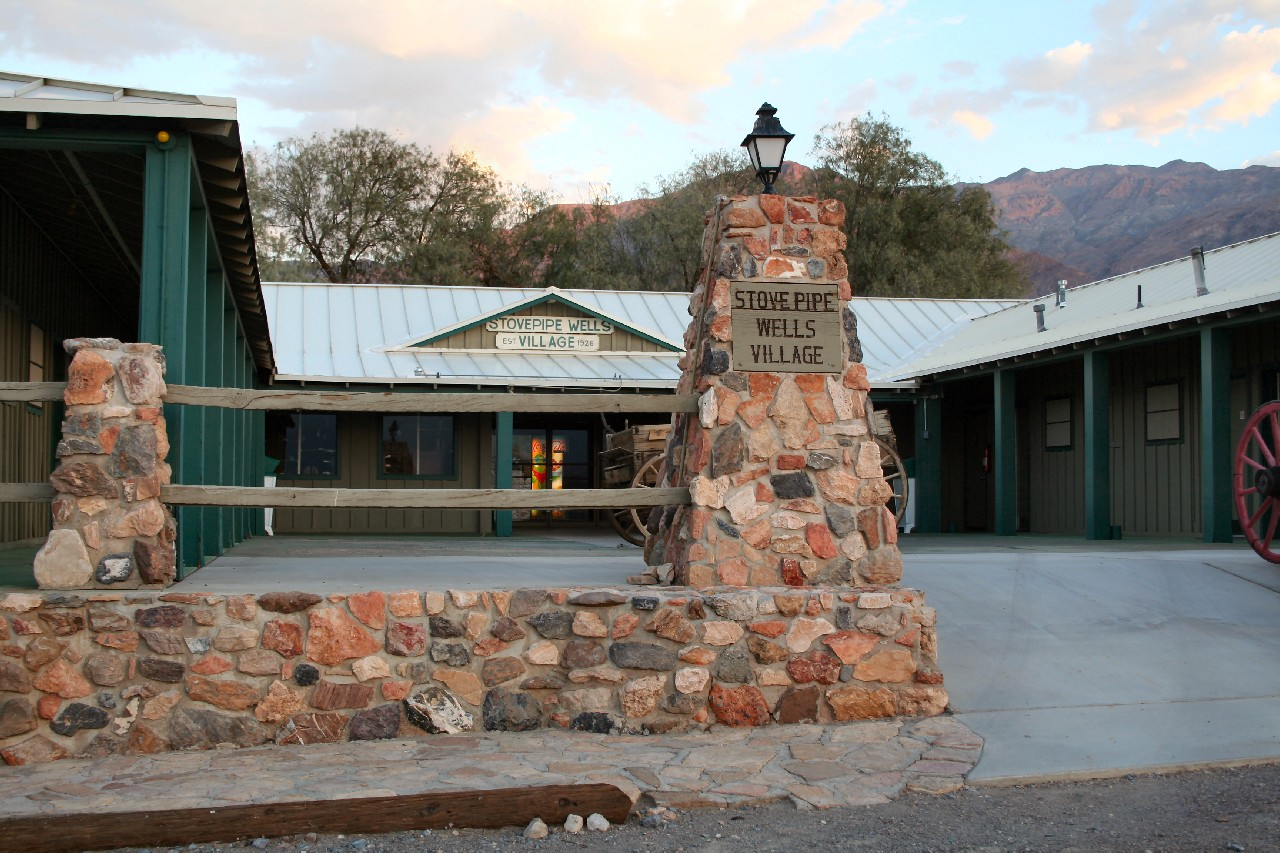
Stovepipe Wells "downtown"

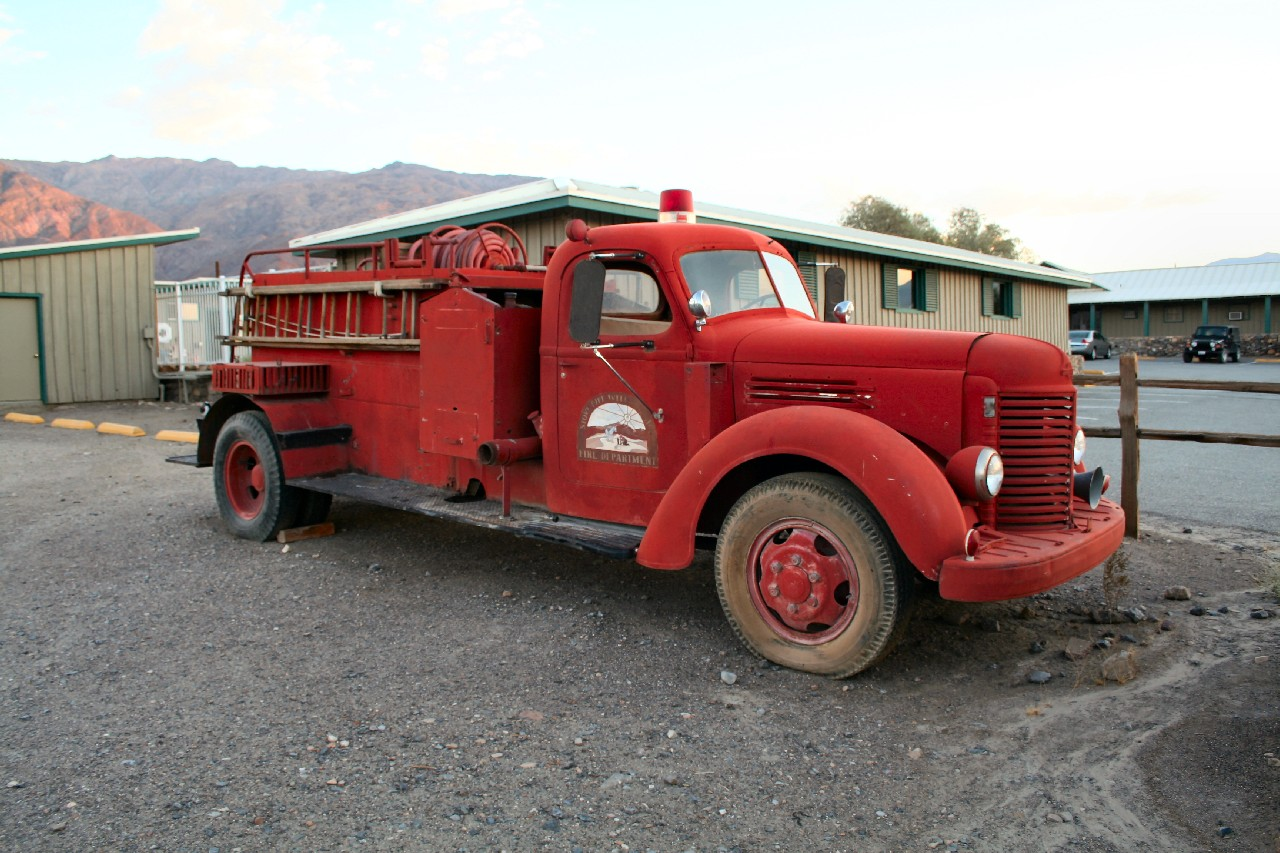
Stovepipe Wells Fire Dept truck

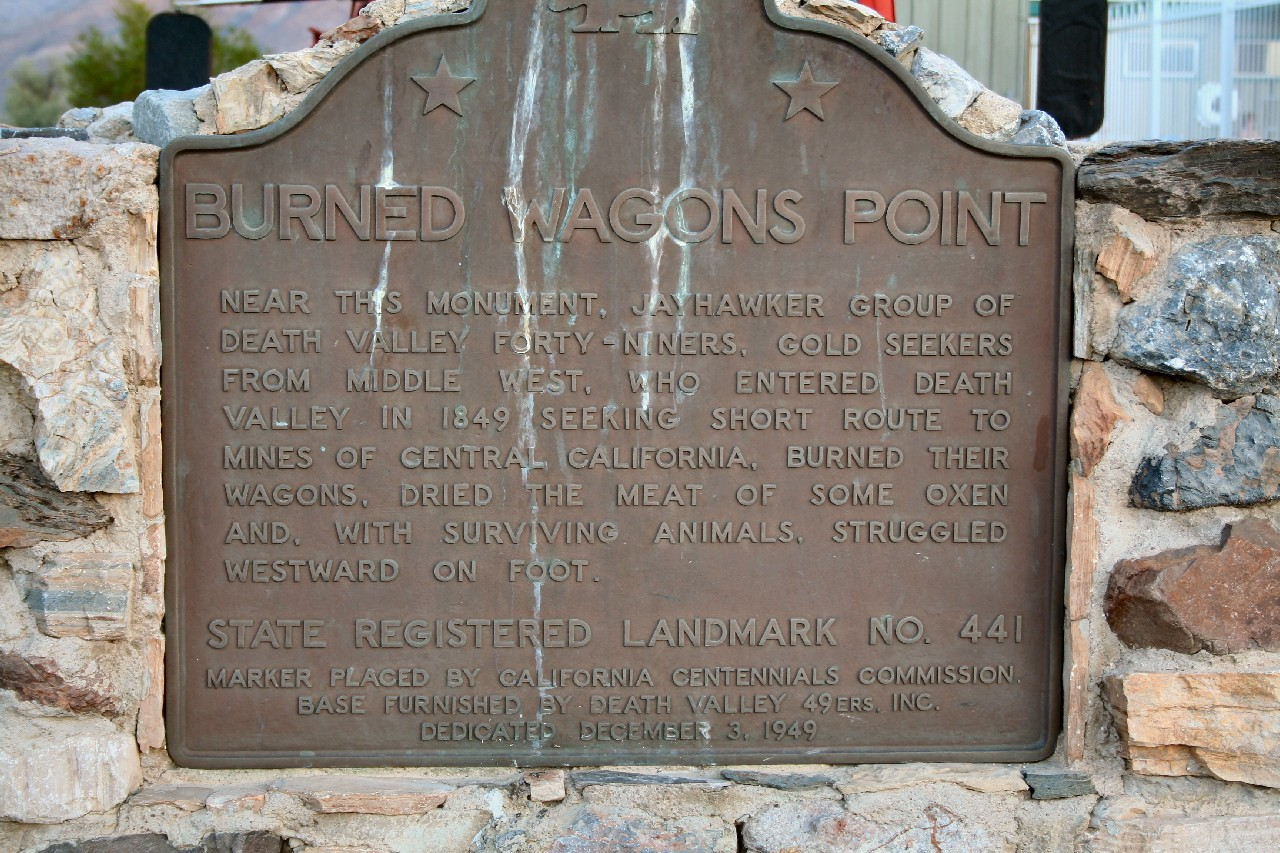
Burned Wagons plaque, California Historical Landmark

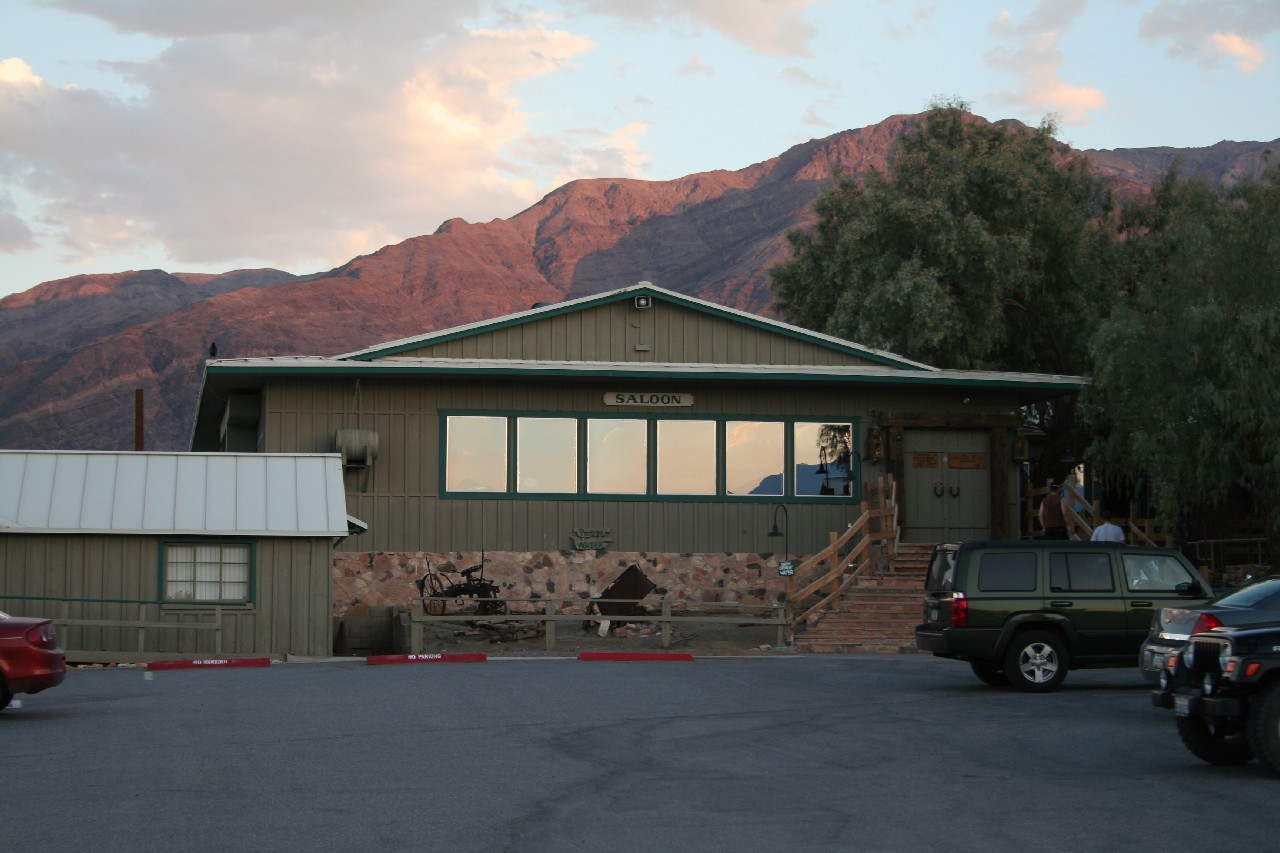
Stovepipe Wells saloon at dusk

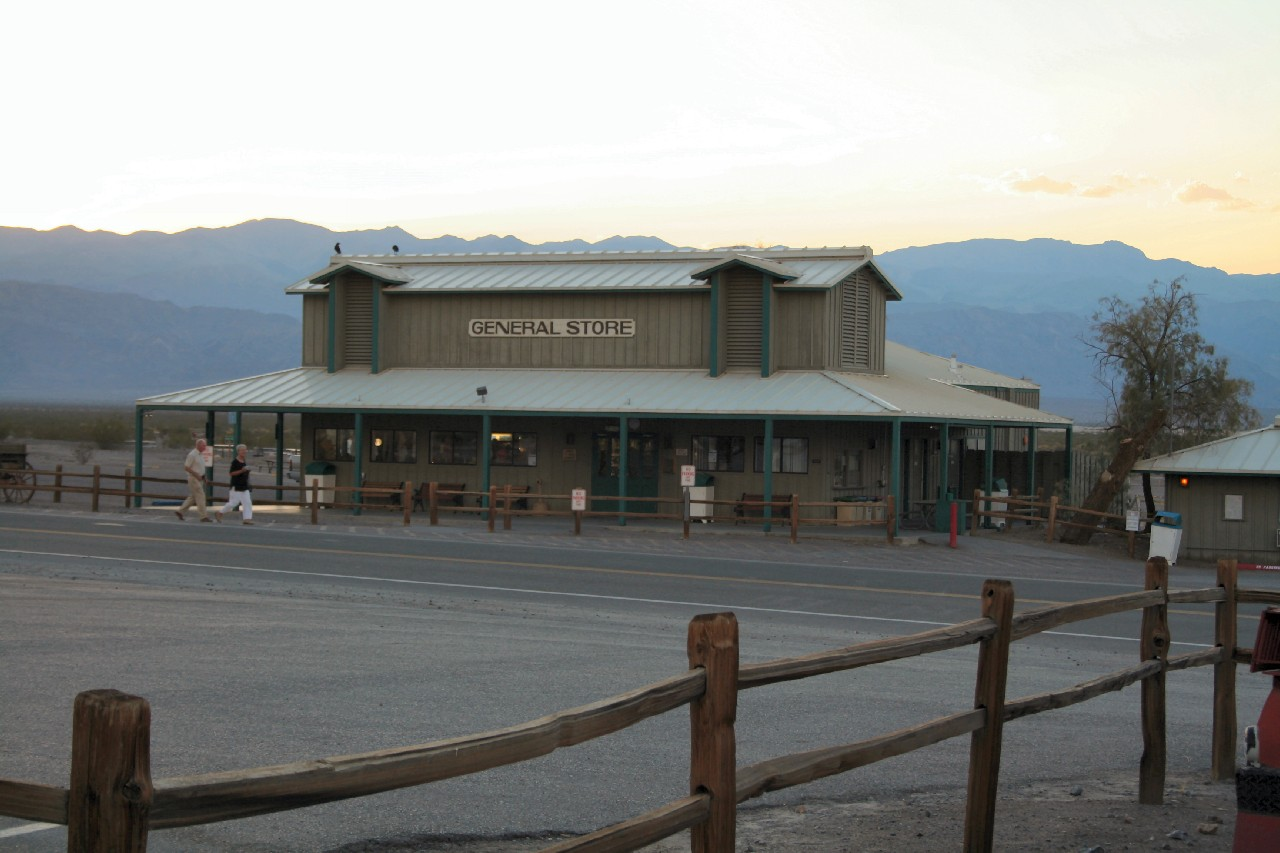
Stovepipe Wells general store at dusk

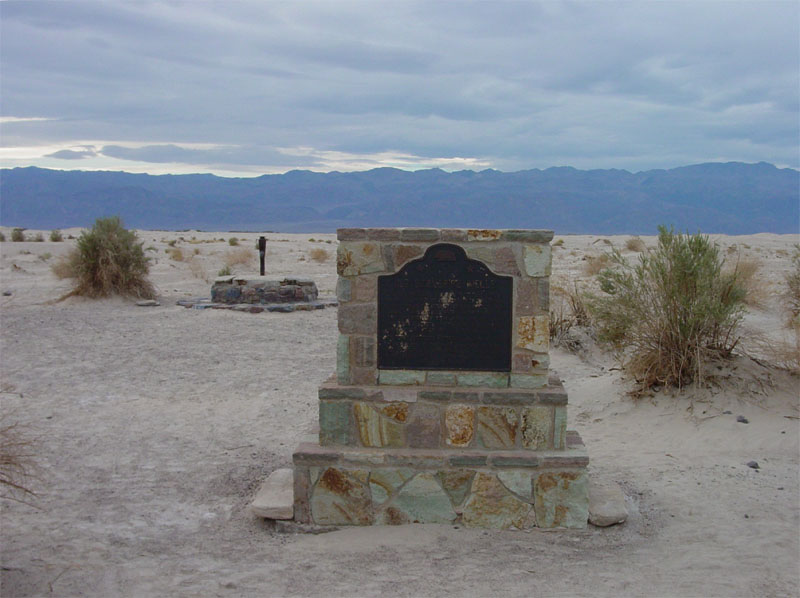
Old Stovepipe Wells plaque, California Historical Landmark

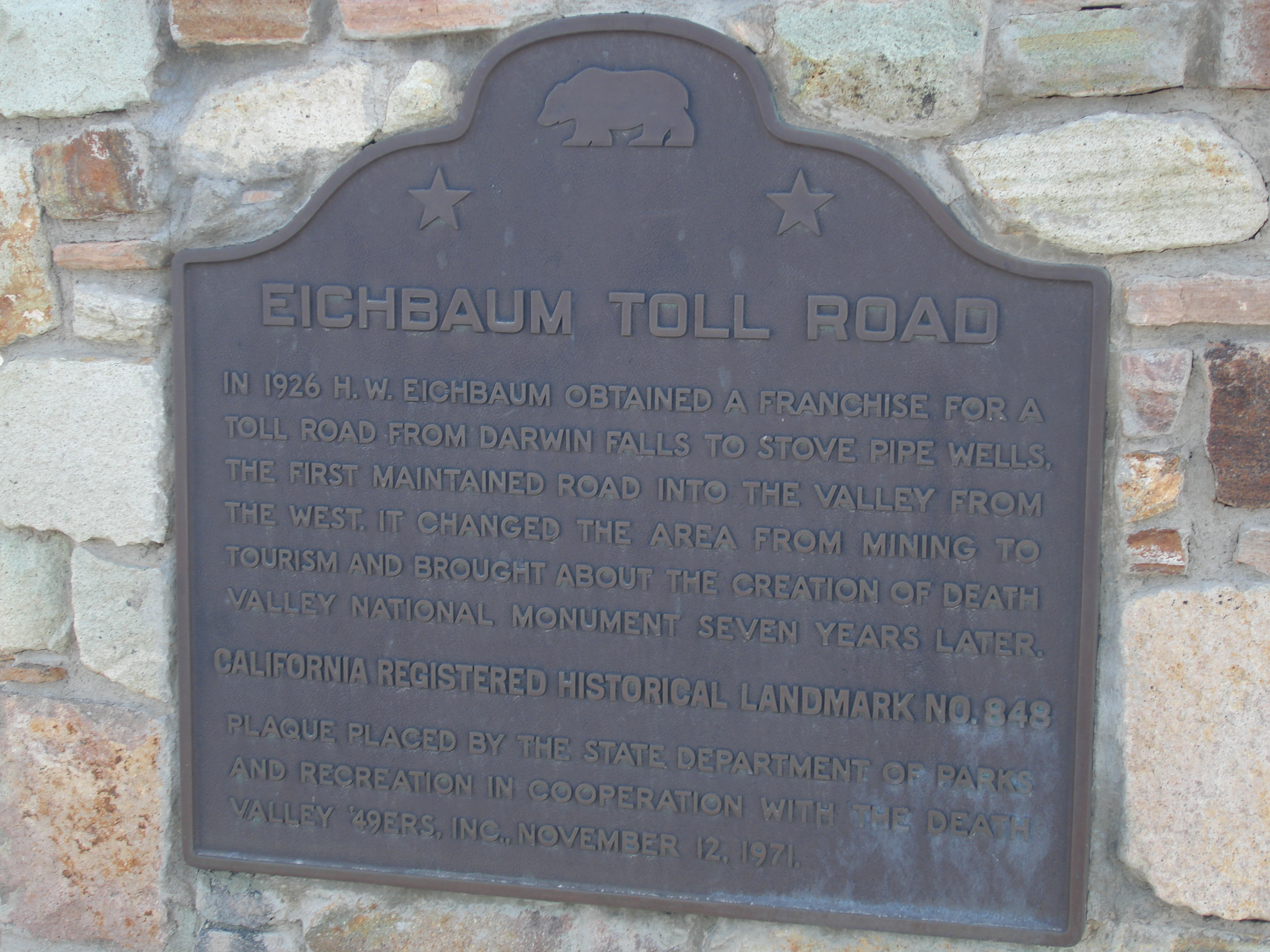
Eichbaum Toll Road plaque, California Historical Landmark

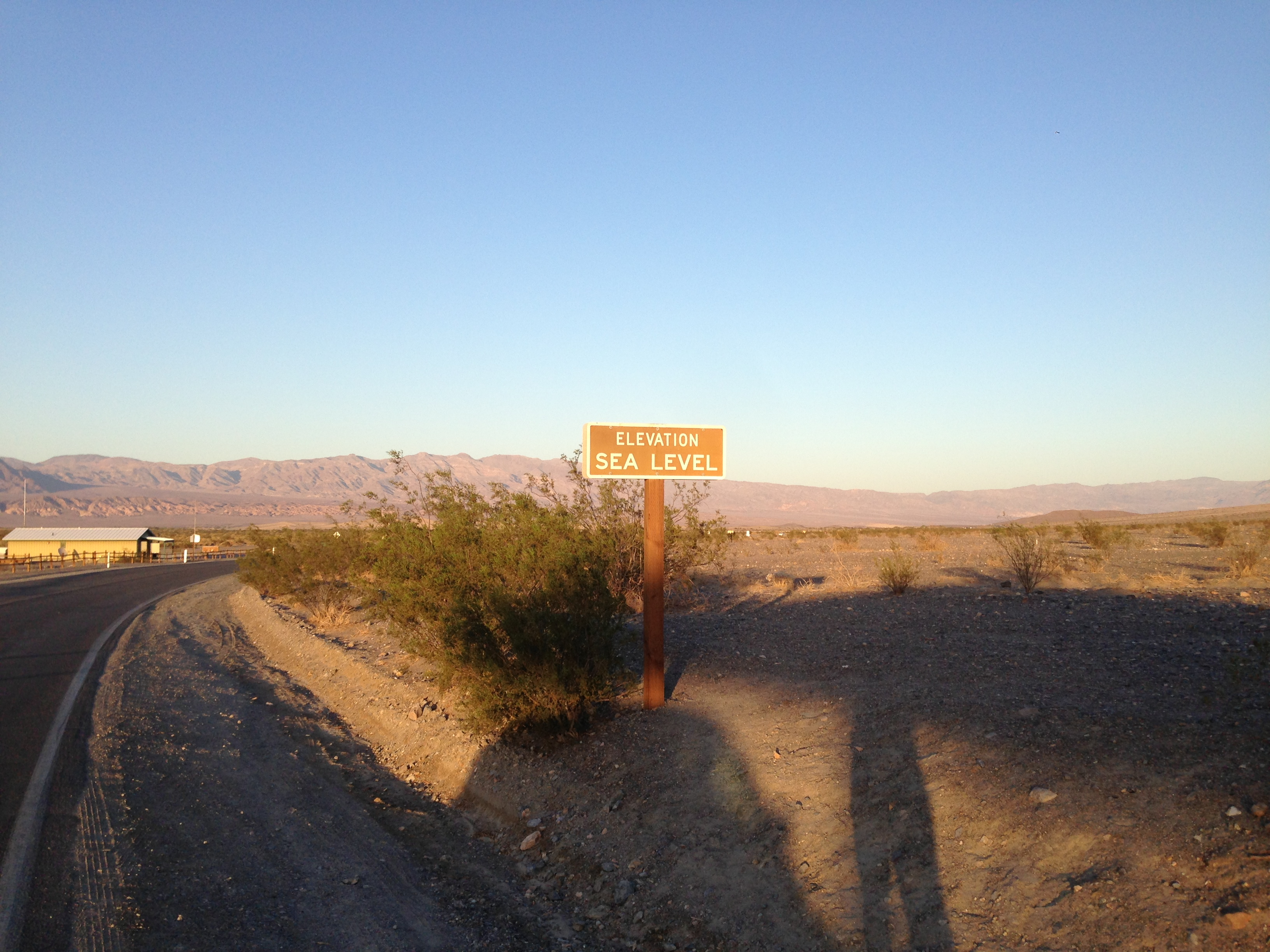
Sea Level sign in Stovepipe Wells

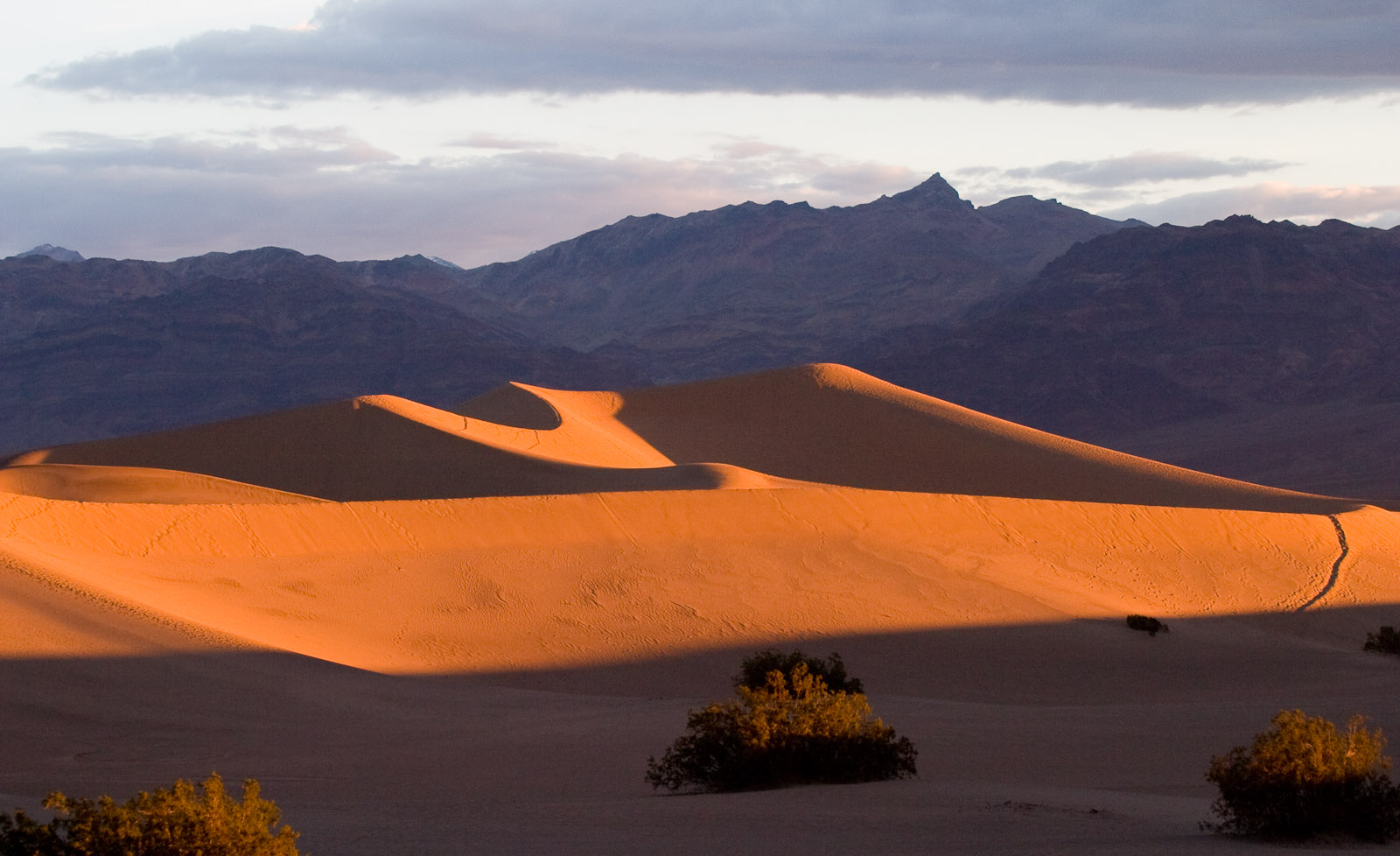
Stovepipe Wells dunes at sunrise

== See also ==
- California Historical Landmarks in Inyo County
- History of California through 1899

== Sources ==
- 7350.7U Location Identifiers, The National Flight Data Center, Federal Aviation Administration ATPUBS, US Department of Transportation, September 1, 2005.
- Map: Stovepipe Wells, California 7.5-minute quadrangle, US Geological Survey, 1988.
- National Geographic Names Database, US Geological Survey, 1995.
- California Air Resources Board web site.
- Richard E. Lingenfelter. (1988) Death Valley and the Amargosa: A Land of Illusion: University of California Press. p. 290, p. 475.
