= Harmony Borax Works =

Former borax refinery in Death Valley, California, United States

- U.S. National Register of Historic Places
- U.S. Historic district
- California Historical Landmark
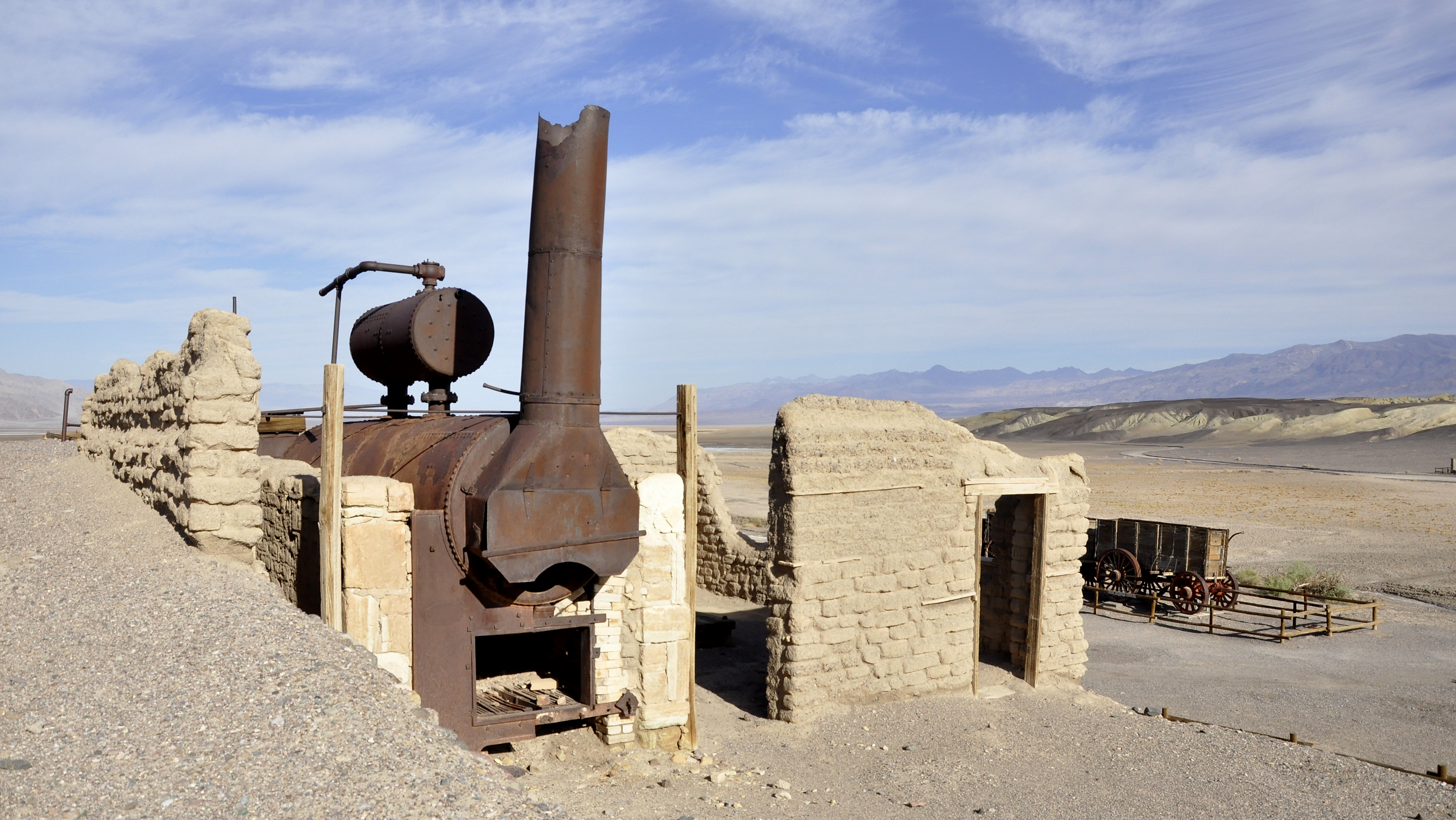

- Location within California Location within the United States
- Nearest city: Stovepipe Wells, California
- Coordinates: 36°28′48″N 116°52′24.5″W
- Built: 1883
- NRHP reference No.: 74000339
- CHISL No.: 773
- Added to NRHP: December 31, 1974

The Harmony Borax Works is located in Death Valley at Furnace Creek Springs, then called Greenland. It is now located within Death Valley National Park in Inyo County, California. It is on the National Register of Historic Places.

== Origin and twenty-mule teams ==
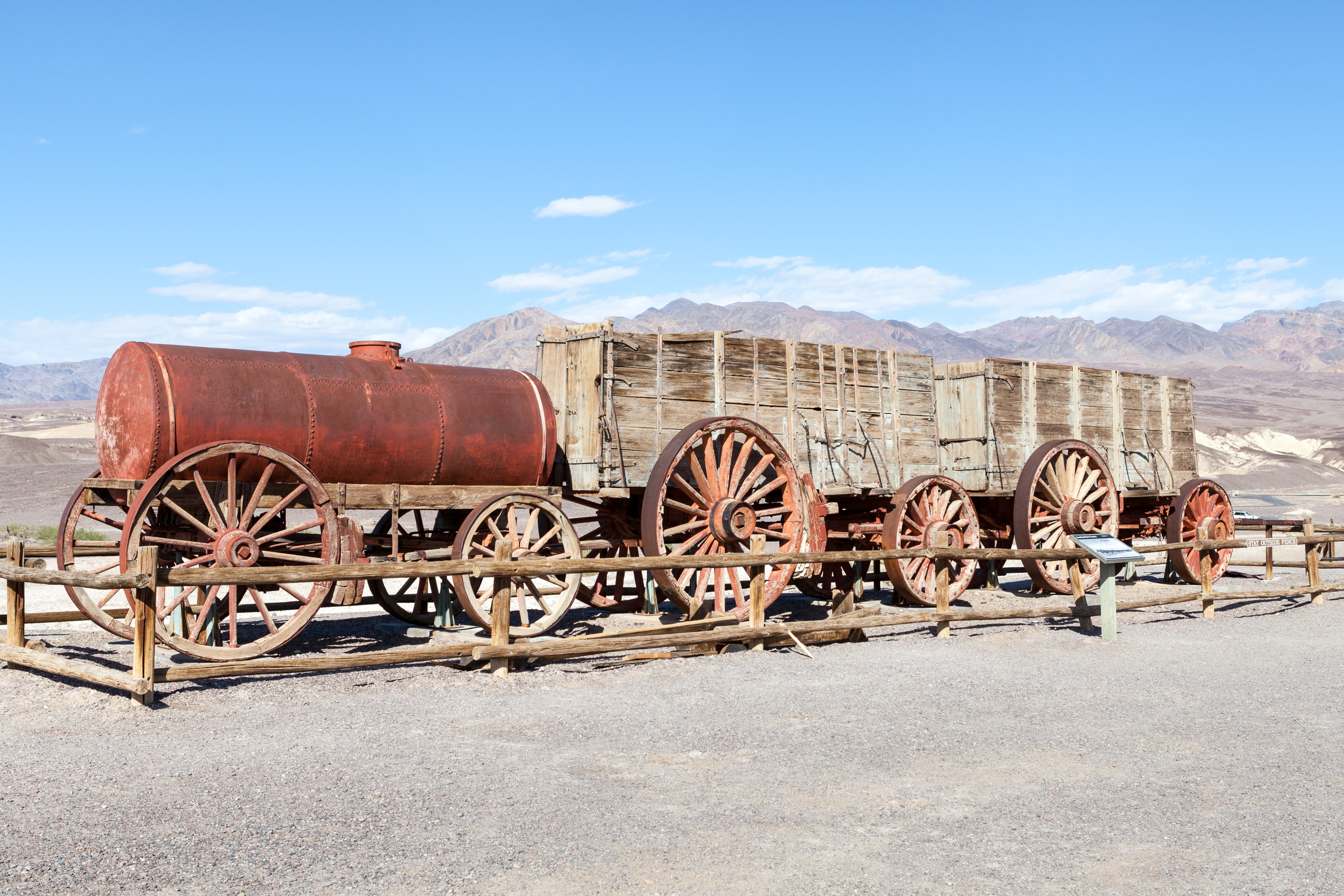
A twenty-mule team wagon

After discovery of borax deposits here by Aaron and Rosie Winters in 1881, business associates William Tell Coleman and Francis Marion Smith subsequently obtained claims to these deposits, opening the way for "large-scale" borax mining in Death Valley. Coleman constructed Harmony Borax Works and production of borax started in late 1883. In an effort to save money and achieve greater efficiency, Coleman had unique borax wagons designed to get the product to the closest railhead in Mojave, California. The wagons consisted of two box wagons and a water wagon pulled by a team of twenty animals typically consisting of eighteen mules and two horses. While these methods were in use only for a short period of time, from 1883 to 1889, they gained great notoriety and became famous after the fact thanks to the advertising efforts of Stephen T. Mather, who later became the National Park Service's first director.

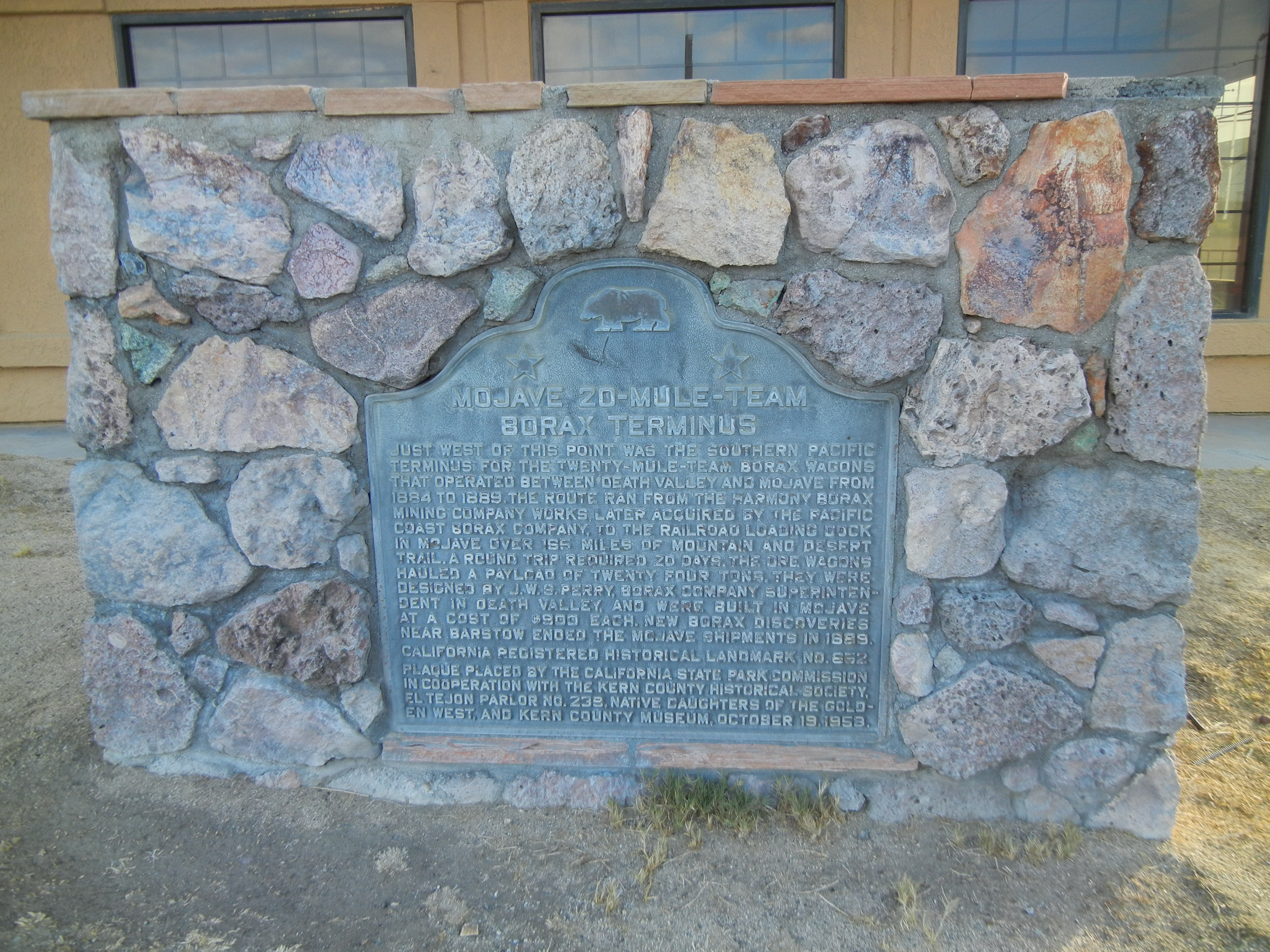
20 Mule Team Terminus: Sign in Mojave, CA

During the summer months, when it was too hot to crystallize borax in Death Valley, a smaller borax mining operation shifted to his Amargosa Borax Plant in Amargosa, near the present community of Tecopa, California. The Harmony Works remained under Coleman's operation until 1888, when his business collapsed.

== Frank M. "Borax" Smith ==
William Coleman's original holdings in the works were subsequently acquired by Frank M. "Borax" Smith in 1890, to become the Pacific Coast Borax Company with the 20 Mule Team Borax brand. Activity at Harmony Borax Works ceased with the development of the richer Colemanite borax deposits at Borate in the Calico Mountains, where they continued until 1907.

The Harmony Borax Works was placed on the National Register of Historic Places on December 31, 1974. They are part of the National Park Service historical site preservation program in Death Valley National Park.

== Visiting Harmony Borax Works ==
As part of Death Valley National Park, the site is generally open to the public and includes a loop trail and educational interpretation.

== See also ==
- Eagle Borax Works
