= Furnace Creek, California =

Census-designated place in California, United States

- Unincorporated Community; Census Designated Place
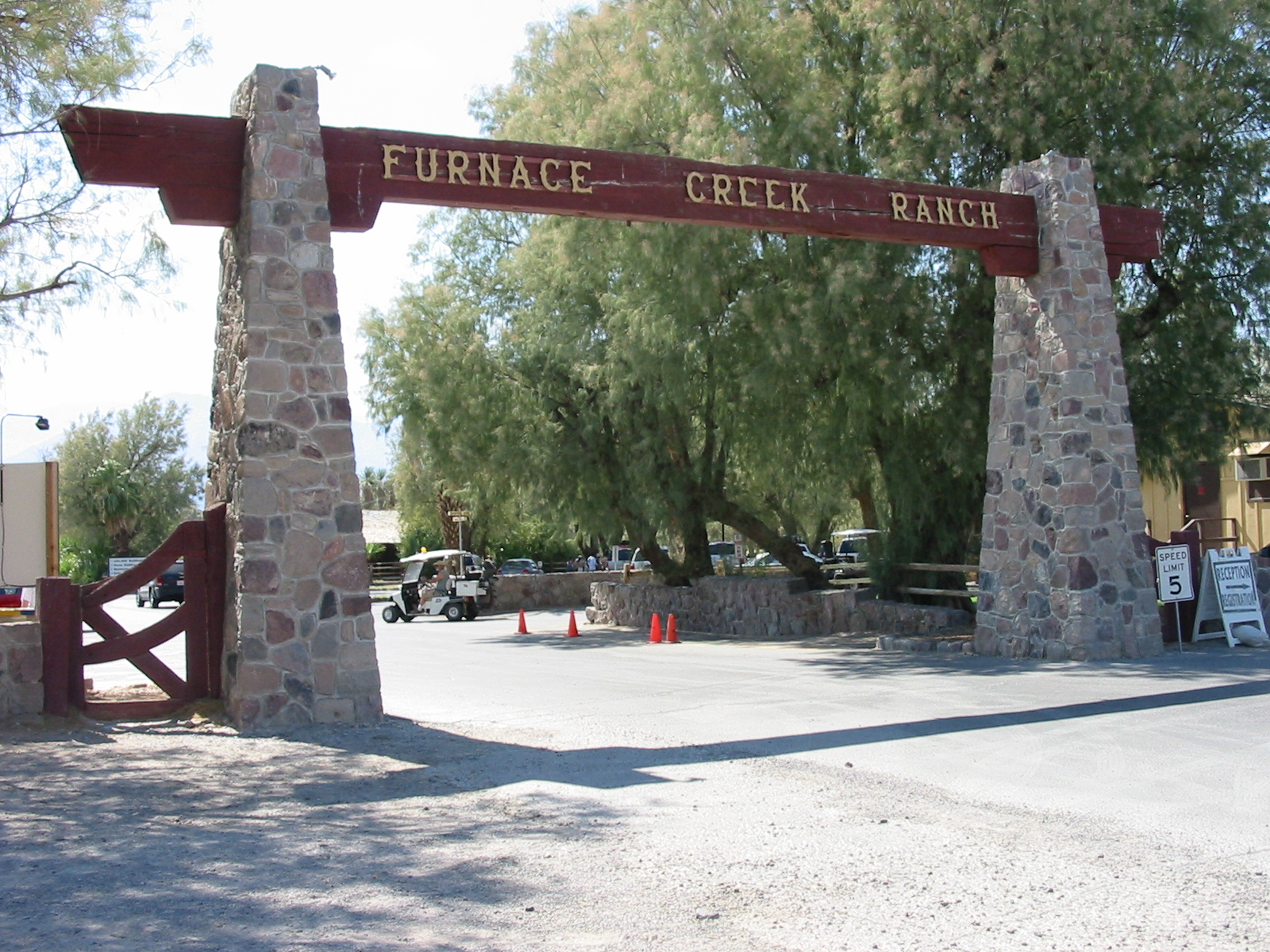
- Entrance to Furnace Creek Ranch

- Location in Inyo County and the state of California

- Location in California Location in the United States
- Coordinates: 36°27′29″N 116°52′15″W
- Country: United States
- State: California
- County: Inyo

Area
  - Total: 31.462 sq mi (81.487 km^{2})
  - Land: 31.462 sq mi (81.487 km^{2})
  - Water: 0 sq mi (0 km^{2}) 0%
- Elevation: −226 ft (−69 m)

Population (2020)
  - Total: 136
  - Density: 4.32/sq mi (1.67/km^{2})
- Time zone: UTC−08:00 (PST)
  - Summer (DST): UTC−07:00 (PDT)
- ZIP Code: 92328
- Area codes: 442/760
- FIPS code: 06-28021
- GNIS feature ID: 2408270

Furnace Creek (formerly Greenland Ranch) is a census-designated place (CDP) in Inyo County, California, United States. The population was 136 at the 2020 census, up from 24 at the 2010 census. The elevation of the village is 190 feet (58 m) below sea level. The visitor center, museum, and headquarters of Death Valley National Park are located at Furnace Creek.

== History ==
Francis Marion Smith and William Tell Coleman's company, the Harmony Borax Works, established Greenland Ranch in 1883, named after the green alfalfa fields which they planted there. They established a weather station at the ranch in 1891. Greenland Ranch was renamed Furnace Creek Ranch in 1933.

The Timbisha tribe currently live at the Death Valley Indian Community reservation here. They provided many of the artisans and builders to construct the original Fred Harvey Company resort buildings, the Indian Village, and Park Service structures. They compose the majority of residents of Furnace Creek's permanent population at the tribe's reservation. Furnace Creek was formerly the center of Death Valley mining and operations for the Pacific Coast Borax Company and the historic 20-Mule Teams hauling wagon trains of borax across the Mojave Desert.

== Geography ==
According to the United States Census Bureau, Furnace Creek has a total area of 31.5 square miles (82 km^{2}), all land.

Springs in the Amargosa Range created a natural oasis at Furnace Creek, which has subsequently dwindled due to diversion of this water to support the village.

=== Climate ===
Furnace Creek, like the rest of Death Valley, has an extreme version of a hot desert climate (Köppen: BWh), with long, extremely hot summers; short, very mild winters; and little rainfall. Daytime temperatures range from roughly 65 °F (18 °C) in December to 116 °F (47 °C) in July, while overnight lows typically oscillate from 40 to 90 °F (4 to 32 °C). From 1911 through 2006, a period of 95 years, Furnace Creek had an average high temperature of 91.4 °F (33.0 °C) and an average low temperature of 62.9 °F (17.2 °C). During that period, the hottest month was July, with an average daily high temperature of 116.5 °F (46.9 °C), and the driest month was June, with an average monthly precipitation of 0.05 in (1.3 mm). Furnace Creek holds the record for the most consecutive days above 120 °F (49 °C): 43 days, from July 6 through August 17, 1917. The average temperature of July 2018 was 108.1 °F (42.3 °C), which is the highest temperature of any month for any place in the world.

Furnace Creek holds the record for the highest recorded temperature in the world, reaching 134 °F (56.7 °C) on July 10, 1913. Some meteorologists dispute the accuracy of this measurement.

In addition, a ground temperature of 201 °F (94 °C) was recorded in Furnace Creek on July 15, 1972; this may be the highest natural ground surface temperature ever recorded. (Temperatures measured directly on the ground may exceed air temperatures by 50 to 90 °F [28 to 50 °C].) The former world record for the highest overnight low temperature was 110.0 °F (43.3 °C), set on July 5, 1918, in Furnace Creek.

Climate data for Furnace Creek, Death Valley, California (1991–2020 normals, (Note: Mean maxima and minima (i.e. the highest and lowest temperature readings during an entire month or year) calculated based on data at said location from 1991 to 2020.) extremes 1911–present). Elevation: −190 ft (−58 m).
Month	Jan	Feb	Mar	Apr	May	Jun	Jul	Aug	Sep	Oct	Nov	Dec	Year
Record high °F (°C)	90 (32)	97 (36)	107 (42)	113 (45)	122 (50)	129 (54)	134 (57)	130 (54)	127 (53)	114 (46)	98 (37)	89 (32)	134 (57)
Mean maximum °F (°C)	78.4 (25.8)	85.1 (29.5)	95.4 (35.2)	106.0 (41.1)	113.6 (45.3)	122.0 (50.0)	125.9 (52.2)	124.0 (51.1)	118.1 (47.8)	106.2 (41.2)	90.0 (32.2)	77.8 (25.4)	126.7 (52.6)
Mean daily maximum °F (°C)	67.2 (19.6)	73.7 (23.2)	82.6 (28.1)	91.0 (32.8)	100.7 (38.2)	111.1 (43.9)	117.4 (47.4)	115.9 (46.6)	107.7 (42.1)	93.3 (34.1)	77.4 (25.2)	65.6 (18.7)	92.0 (33.3)
Daily mean °F (°C)	54.9 (12.7)	61.3 (16.3)	69.8 (21.0)	77.9 (25.5)	87.8 (31.0)	97.5 (36.4)	104.2 (40.1)	102.3 (39.1)	93.4 (34.1)	78.9 (26.1)	64.0 (17.8)	53.4 (11.9)	78.8 (26.0)
Mean daily minimum °F (°C)	42.5 (5.8)	49.0 (9.4)	57.1 (13.9)	64.8 (18.2)	75.0 (23.9)	84.0 (28.9)	91.0 (32.8)	88.7 (31.5)	79.1 (26.2)	64.4 (18.0)	50.5 (10.3)	41.1 (5.1)	65.6 (18.7)
Mean minimum °F (°C)	30.5 (−0.8)	36.1 (2.3)	42.8 (6.0)	49.8 (9.9)	58.5 (14.7)	67.9 (19.9)	78.3 (25.7)	75.3 (24.1)	65.4 (18.6)	49.5 (9.7)	35.9 (2.2)	29.0 (−1.7)	28.0 (−2.2)
Record low °F (°C)	15 (−9)	20 (−7)	26 (−3)	35 (2)	42 (6)	49 (9)	62 (17)	65 (18)	41 (5)	32 (0)	24 (−4)	19 (−7)	15 (−9)
Average precipitation inches (mm)	0.37 (9.4)	0.52 (13)	0.25 (6.4)	0.10 (2.5)	0.03 (0.76)	0.05 (1.3)	0.10 (2.5)	0.10 (2.5)	0.20 (5.1)	0.12 (3.0)	0.10 (2.5)	0.26 (6.6)	2.20 (56)
Average precipitation days (≥ 0.01 in)	2.4	2.9	2.0	1.1	0.9	0.3	1.1	0.9	0.8	1.1	0.9	1.6	16.0
Mean monthly sunshine hours	217	226	279	330	372	390	403	372	330	310	210	186	3,625
Source: NOAA (September record high)

== Demographics ==
Historical population
Census	Pop.	Note	%±
2000	31		—
2010	24		−22.6%
2020	136		466.7%
U.S. Decennial Census; 1860–1870 1880-1890; 1900 1910 1920; 1930 1940 1950; 1960 1970 1980; 1990 2000 2010; 2020

Furnace Creek first appeared as a census designated place in the 2000 U.S. census.

=== Racial and ethnic composition ===
Furnace Creek CDP, California – Racial and ethnic composition Note: the US Census treats Hispanic/Latino as an ethnic category. This table excludes Latinos from the racial categories and assigns them to a separate category. Hispanics/Latinos may be of any race.
Race / Ethnicity (NH = Non-Hispanic)	Pop 2000	Pop 2010	Pop 2020	% 2000	% 2010	% 2020
White alone (NH)	6	6	75	19.35%	25.00%	55.15%
Black or African American alone (NH)	0	0	2	0.00%	0.00%	1.47%
Native American or Alaska Native alone (NH)	25	16	14	80.65%	66.67%	10.29%
Asian alone (NH)	0	0	3	0.00%	0.00%	2.21%
Native Hawaiian or Pacific Islander alone (NH)	0	0	0	0.00%	0.00%	0.00%
Other race alone (NH)	0	0	0	0.00%	0.00%	0.00%
Mixed race or Multiracial (NH)	0	2	9	0.00%	8.33%	6.62%
Hispanic or Latino (any race)	0	0	33	0.00%	0.00%	24.26%
Total	31	24	136	100.00%	100.00%	100.00%

=== 2020 census ===
At the 2020 United States Census, Furnace Creek had a population of 136. The population density was 4.3 inhabitants per square mile (1.7/km^{2}). The racial makeup was 79 (58.1%) White, 2 (1.5%) African American, 14 (10.3%) Native American, 3 (2.2%) Asian, 0 (0.0%) Pacific Islander, 16 (11.8%) from other races, and 22 (16.2%) from two or more races. Hispanic or Latino of any race were 33 persons (24.3%).

There were 100 households, out of which 5 (5.0%) had children under the age of 18 living in them, 17 (17.0%) were married-couple households, 6 (6.0%) were cohabiting couple households, 18 (18.0%) had a female householder with no partner present, and 59 (59.0%) had a male householder with no partner present. 68 households (68.0%) were one person, and 20 (20.0%) were one person aged 65 or older. The average household size was 1.36. There were 24 families (24.0% of all households).
The population consisted of 10 people (7.4%) under 18, 12 (8.8%) aged 18 to 24, 29 (21.3%) aged 25 to 44, 45 (33.1%) aged 45 to 64, and 40 (29.4%) who were 65 or older. The median age was 56.0 years.

There were 135 housing units at an average density of 4.3 units per square mile (1.7 units/km^{2}), of which 100 (74.1%) were occupied. Of these, 25 (25.0%) were owner-occupied, and 75 (75.0%) were occupied by renters.

== Government ==
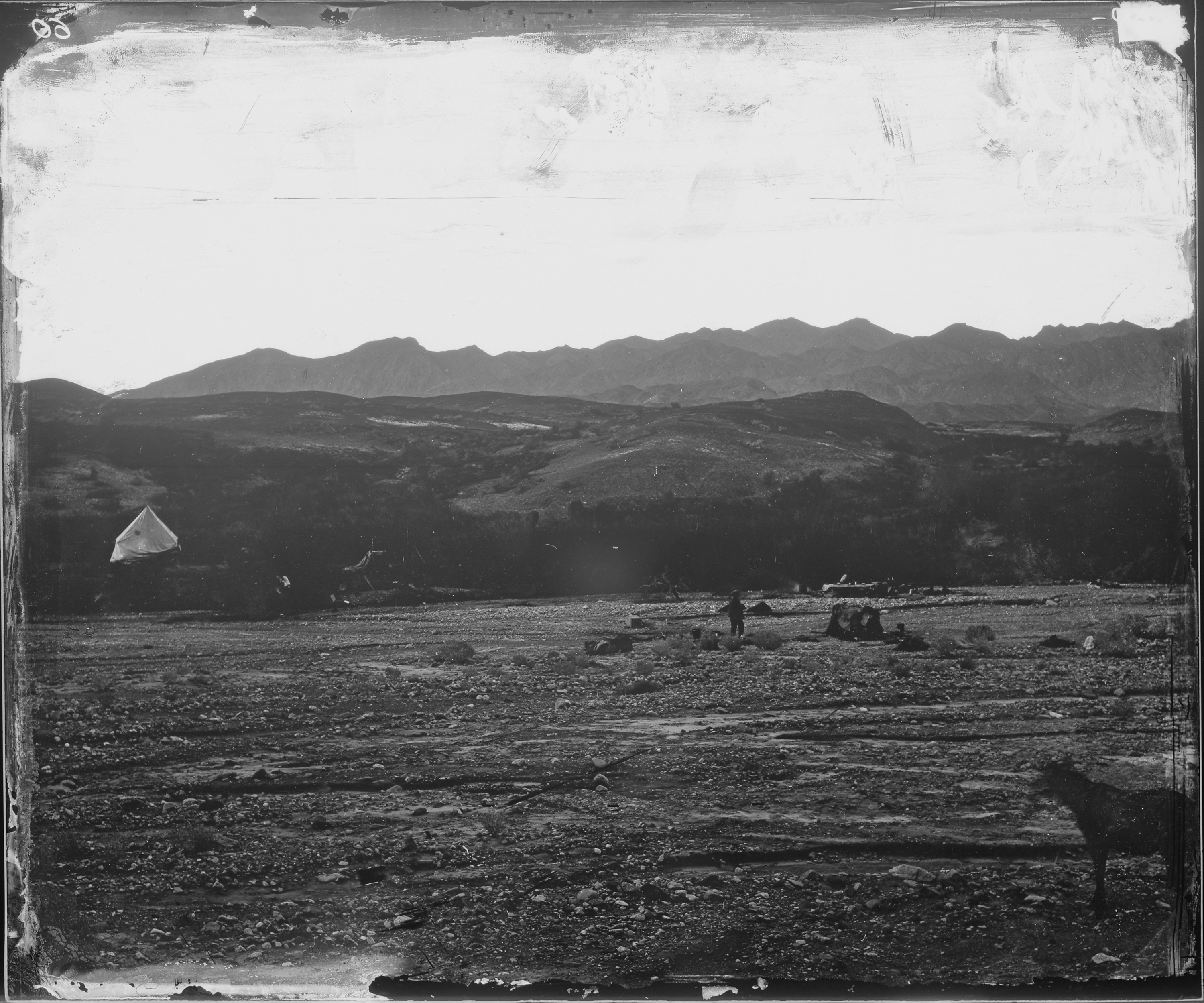
Furnace Creek in 1871

In the state legislature, Furnace Creek is in the 4th senatorial district, represented by Republican Marie Alvarado-Gil, and the 8th Assembly district, represented by Republican David Tangipa.

Federally, Furnace Creek is in California's 3rd congressional district, represented by Independent Kevin Kiley.

== Tourist facilities ==
The village is surrounded by a number of National Park Service public campgrounds. The Ranch at Death Valley is located there, part of the Oasis at Death Valley, one of the park's major tourist facilities. The Furnace Creek Golf Course attached to the ranch claims to be the lowest in the world at 214 feet (65 m) below sea level. Some lodging is closed in the summer when temperatures can exceed 125 °F (52 °C), but the golf course remains open; the resort established a summer tournament in 2011 called the Heatstroke Open which drew a field of 48. There is also a restaurant, café, store, and gas station in Furnace Creek village. The Furnace Creek Airport is located about 0.75 miles (1.21 km) west of the park headquarters.

== California Historical Landmark ==
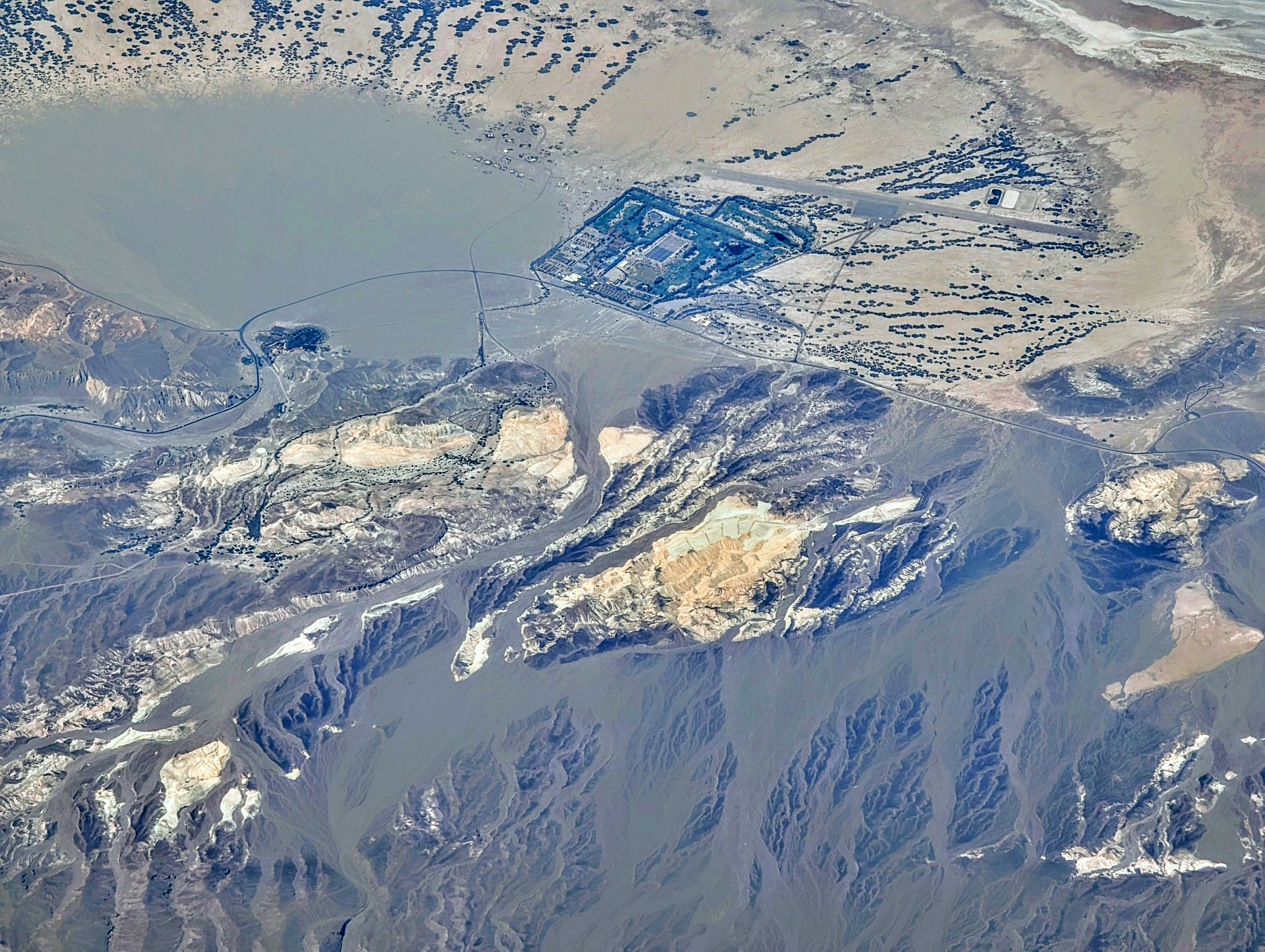
Aerial view of Furnace Creek, an oasis in Death Valley

Near Furnace Creek is California Historical Landmark number 442, Death Valley '49ers Gateway, assigned on October 24, 1949. The marker is at the corner of State Route 190 and Badwater Road.

The California Historical Landmark reads:

NO. 442 DEATH VALLEY GATEWAY – Through this natural gateway the Death Valley '49ers, more than 100 emigrants from the Middle West seeking a shortcut to gold fields of central California, entered Death Valley in December 1849. All suffered from thirst and starvation. Seeking an escape from the region, two contingents went southwest from here, while the others proceeded northwest.

== Education ==
Furnace Creek is served by the Death Valley Unified School District for grades PK-12.

== See also ==
- Geology of the Death Valley area
- Places of interest in the Death Valley area
- History of California through 1899
- Harry Wade Exit Route, a 49er path out of Death Valley
- California Historical Landmarks in Inyo County
