= John Haney Rogers =

American pioneer in the California Gold Rush

John Haney Rogers, born 1822 in Tennessee, died December 27, 1906 Merced, California, was a pioneer of the California Gold Rush, and was one of the first known group of European-Americans to travel through Death Valley, California, in December 1849.

== Early life ==
Little is known of Rogers's life, other than what is recounted in the autobiography of William L. Manly, "Death Valley in 1849", and there are no known photographs or portraits of him.

== Death Valley, Rescue of the Bennett-Arcane Emigrant party ==
Rogers is notable primarily for the incident recounted here. In the autumn of 1849, several groups of emigrant gold-seekers were assembled in Salt Lake City, Utah, preparing to head for Southern California via the Old Spanish Trail. Although this route would have brought the emigrants to California about 200 miles south of the gold fields, they knew it was too close to winter to attempt a crossing of the central Sierra Nevada over Donner Pass. At this point, a map was presented to the group by a Captain Smith, who had been hired to guide a different group of emigrants, showing a purported "short cut" to California that crossed south-central Nevada along the foot of an east–west mountain range, along which water and grass for the animals would be available, then into California at a latitude much closer to the gold fields. The groups argued over this proposed short cut, and eventually split up, with some sticking to the original route, and others adopting the short cut. The "short cut" group included families with children (generally referred to as the Bennett-Arcane party in Manly's book), and several unmarried men, including William Lewis Manly and his friend John H. Rogers.

Unfortunately for these emigrants, the east–west mountain range shown on the map turned out to be a figment of the map-maker's imagination, and for three weeks the team's westward travel was through barren sagebrush desert with hardly any drinkable water and even less forage for the oxen and horses. At the end of November, they had arrived at the base of a mountain range and started to climb, believing this to be the Sierra Nevada, with the California Central Valley just a few more day's travel on the other side. This impression was horribly wrong: the mountains they were climbing were the Amargosa Range, and on a direct westward course, they had four more ranges to cross to reach California. The route they were following began to descend along a dry arroyo that is today known as Furnace Creek Wash, which deposited the teams in the bottom of Death Valley, with the Panamint Range blocking any further progress westward. They were now completely lost, and both people and animals were on the brink of starvation. The group crossed the valley, heading south along the foot of the Panamints in search of a pass. They camped at a spring, now called Bennett's Well, and determined that their only possibility of survival was to send a small party on foot to scout an escape route and perhaps bring help if a settlement could be found. Two young men volunteered to make this attempt, William Lewis Manly and John Rogers, and they were provided with enough provisions for about two weeks, and all of the money in the camp - about $30 - with which to buy supplies and animals if such could be found.

Manly and Rogers started southwest, and after two weeks of walking through the Mojave Desert, with little more than a few pounds of dried meat and a makeshift canteen made of gunpowder cans, they stumbled into a settlement, Rancho San Fernando, 30 miles or so northeast of Los Angeles near Tejon Pass. Here they were able to procure a pair of horses and a mule, and additional provisions, then they began the 250 mile trek back to Death Valley, arriving back at the Bennett's camp after almost a month's round trip journey, and with only the mule still alive, the two horses having died of exhaustion and privation along the return route. This heroic trek, nearly 500 miles through a completely unknown desert wilderness, resulted in the preservation of the lives of all but one of the members of the Bennett-Arcane Party (a Captain Culverwell had died a day or two before Manly and Rogers' return)

== Events after the 1849 Death Valley march ==
Manly and Rogers led the Bennett-Arcane party safely back to Los Angeles, after which they parted ways. Rogers spent some time at gold mining, then moved to Gilroy, California in Santa Clara County, where he was the town's first constable in 1852. Later, he settled in Merced, California, where he owned a farm and lived the remainder of his life.

== Death ==
Near the end of his life, Rogers was suffering from Mercury poisoning, a common condition resulting from the use of mercury to extract gold from low-grade ore, and parts of his feet had been amputated, presumably from mercury-induced gangrene. By 1906, he became a resident at the county hospital in Merced. After losing his feet and one of his eyes, his other eye began failing; he told his fellow residents at the hospital that "as soon as he became totally blind, he would commit suicide."

On 28 December 1906, Rogers was found "rapidly bleeding to death" after having secreted away a razor blade: "His neck was gashed in six different places, though the blade had failed to touch a vital part. The desperate man had also inflicted three wounds upon each of his arms at the elbow joints." The county physician stitched his wounds and he briefly appeared to be recovering, during which period he alternately "begged to be allowed to die" and "expressed sorrow at his act." Rogers died from his wounds at 1PM on 29 December 1906.

== Geographic Features bearing John H. Rogers' name ==
- Rogers Peak

Rogers Lake: a dry lake bed (playa) in the Mojave desert, located on Edwards Air Force Base. This dry lake bed is used as an emergency runway for aircraft testing, and was used as a runway for landing the Space Shuttle several times, as it is over 20,000 feet long and has no buildings adjacent to it in the event of an aircraft veering off the runway.
