= William L. Manly =

American western pioneer (1820–1903)

- Born: William Lewis Manly; April 6, 1820; St. Albans, Vermont, U.S.
- Died: February 5, 1903 (aged 82); San Jose, California, U.S.
- Resting place: Woodbridge Masonic Cemetery, Woodbridge, California, U.S.
- Occupations: Fur Hunter; Guide; Farmer; Writer
- Spouse: Mary Jane Woods (m. 1862)
- Relatives: Ebenezer Manly (father); Phoebe Calkins (mother)

William Lewis Manly (April 6, 1820 – February 5, 1903) was an American pioneer of the mid-19th century. He was a fur hunter, wagon train guide and gold prospector, and then a farmer and writer in his later years.

He wrote an autobiography about the pioneer experience in the Far West, in particular the 1848 California Gold Rush. It was first published with the title From Vermont to California, then in a second edition with the title Death Valley in '49.

== Early years ==
Manly was born near St. Albans, Vermont, the son of Ebenezer Manly and Phoebe (Calkins) Manly. In 1829, at the age of nine Manly left for Ohio with his family. Later, as a pioneer, he went to Michigan, prior to statehood. He then went fur trapping in Wisconsin, in Ohio, and in what would be the Dakota Territory.

== California gold rush ==
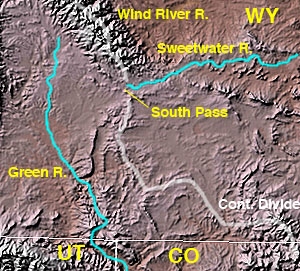

In 1849, at the age of twenty-nine, Manly joined the California Gold Rush, traveling overland from Wisconsin.

=== Floating the Green River ===
Upon reaching the Green River, just west of South Pass Manly and a half dozen other men tried to float to California by use of an abandoned ferry they found down the Green to the Colorado River, then on to California. They put in the river in Wyoming and floated downstream through the canyon of the Gates of Lodore and possibly behind to present day Green River, Utah On disembarking they were met by Chief Walkara, who helped them to travel overland to the Wasatch Front.

=== Overland to California ===
South of present-day Provo, Utah, Manly joined others traveling to southern California. In December they became lost in the Great Basin Desert and subsequently entered Death Valley in the northern Mojave Desert, having followed an inaccurate map for three weeks. Their food supplies were almost exhausted, and the oxen pulling their wagons were dying of starvation. Manly and his associate John Haney Rogers trekked 250 miles on foot across the Mojave to scout an evacuation route for the families trapped in Death Valley. Arriving at Rancho San Fernando near Los Angeles, California, they procured food and horses from Mexican villagers and backtracked to save the wagon train from starvation and to lead them to Rancho San Francisco.

== Life in California ==
Manly worked the gold fields for several months, then returned to his farm in Wisconsin via steamboat, crossing the isthmus of Panama overland. In 1851, Manly returned to California by the same method, arriving in San Francisco shortly after the fire of 1851 and continued in the goldfields until the fall of 1859, by which time he had saved enough money to buy land 250 acres (1.0 km^{2}) in the Communications Hill, San Jose area, paying $16 an acre, $4,000 in all, where he planted a farm. His house was located at the corner of Asbury Street and Stockton Avenue in San Jose, and it was demolished in 1944.

On July 9, 1862, at the age of 42, Manly married Mary Jane Woods of Lodi, California.

== Autobiography ==
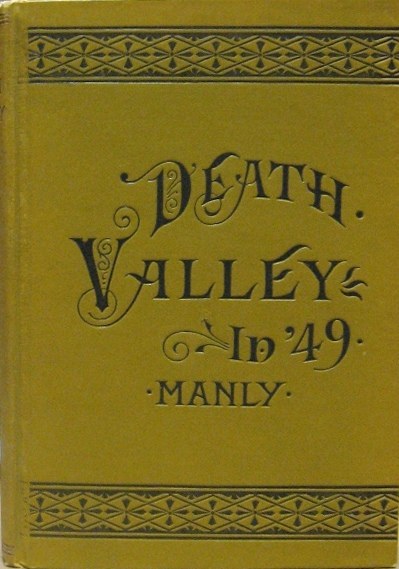
Death Valley in '49 (1894)

Manly wrote his first manuscript, referencing his diary (or notes) in early 1851 after returning east. He had it sent to his parents to keep for him, but it burned in their farmhouse shortly thereafter. Upon learning this, he decided to put the traumatic past events behind him, and stopped keeping his diary. Thirty years later, his friends finally convinced him to recount his memories. By this time, his diary was "lost" (probably also burned, perhaps purposely), but he recreated events from memory. In 1886, Manly published "From Vermont to California" in Santa Clara Valley, a monthly agricultural journal.

In writing his memoirs, Manly contacted all the relevant people possible, then with the aid of a publishing assistant, wrote the greater part of his autobiography. Death Valley in '49 was published as a book in 1894 at San Jose by the Pacific Tree and Vine Company. The title change was ostensibly to encourage sales, although Death Valley is not spoken of until the tenth chapter.

== Death and legacy ==
On February 5, 1903, Manly died at his home in San Jose, California.

Manly rescued several families of pioneers from Death Valley during the 1849 California Gold Rush. For this reason, three geographic features in Death Valley bear his name: the Manly Beacon near Zabriskie Point, Manly Peak, situated to the south between Panamint Valley and the Death Valley, and Lake Manly, the ancient dried lake in the Valley.

He is the namesake of William Lewis Manly Park in San Jose, and William Manly Street in San Jose.

The actor Brad Johnson portrayed Manley on the first episode, "How Death Valley Got Its Name", of the 18-year syndicated television anthology series, Death Valley Days, originally hosted by Stanley Andrews. Phyllis Coates, in the first of her seven appearances on the program, was cast as the pioneer woman, Virginia Arcane.

A historical marker in Woodbridge, California was erected 1999 by Tuleburgh Chapter No. 69 E Clampus Vitus, and Death Valley 49ers Inc.

== See also ==
- Christian Brevoort Zabriskie
- Walter E. Scott
- John Haney Rogers
- Francis Marion Smith
- Places of interest in the Death Valley area
