= Stovepipe Wells Airport =

Airport in California, United States

- IATA: none; ICAO: none; FAA LID: L09

Summary
- Operator: Department of the Interior
- Coordinates: 36°36′15″N 117°09′33″W
- Interactive map of Stovepipe Wells Airport

Runways
Direction	Length		Surface
Direction	ft	m	Surface
5/23	3,260	994	Asphalt

Stovepipe Wells Airport (FAA LID: L09) is a public airport located one mile (1.6 km) west of Death Valley National Park, serving Inyo County, California, United States. The airport covers 10 acres (4.05 ha) and has one runway.

In 2020, the park proposed closing the airport as part of a redevelopment of the Stovepipe Wells area.
