= Lizard's tail =

Lizard's tail or lizardtail may refer to any of the following plants:

- Crassula muscosa, also known as rattail crassula, watch chain, zipper plant, or princess pine, a succulent plant native to South Africa
- Houttuynia cordata, also known as chameleon plant, heartleaf, fishwort, or bishop's weed, a herbaceous perennial plant native to East and Southeast Asia
- Saururus cernuus, also known as water-dragon, dragon's tail and swamp root, a medicinal and ornamental plant native to eastern North America
- Anemopsis californica, also known as yerba mansa, native to western North America
- Eriophyllum staechadifolium, also known as seaside woolly sunflower, native to coastal western North America
