= Agonopterix sabulella =

Scientific classification
- Kingdom: Animalia
- Phylum: Arthropoda
- Clade: Pancrustacea
- Class: Insecta
- Order: Lepidoptera
- Family: Depressariidae
- Genus: Agonopterix
- Species: A. sabulella

Binomial name
- Agonopterix sabulella (Walsingham, 1881)

Synonyms
- Depressaria sabulella Walsingham, 1881; Agonopteryx callosella Barnes & Busck, 1920

Species of moth

Agonopterix sabulella is a moth in the family Depressariidae. It was described by Thomas de Grey, 6th Baron Walsingham, in 1881. It is found in North America, where it has been recorded from Idaho, Alberta and British Columbia and from Washington to Arizona and California.

The wingspan is 19–23 mm. The forewings are pale ochreous, irrorated with fuscous and shaded with reddish scales. There are two fuscous discal spots at the basal third and a fuscous spot at the end of the cell, preceded above by a less conspicuous spot of the same colour. There is a poorly defined fuscous cloud between the outer and inner pairs of spots in costal half of wing and the apical half of the costa and termen have a reddish suffusion. The hindwings are greyish ochreous.

The larvae feed on Eriophyllum confertiflorum, Eriophyllum lanatum and Eriophyllum stachaediflorum.
