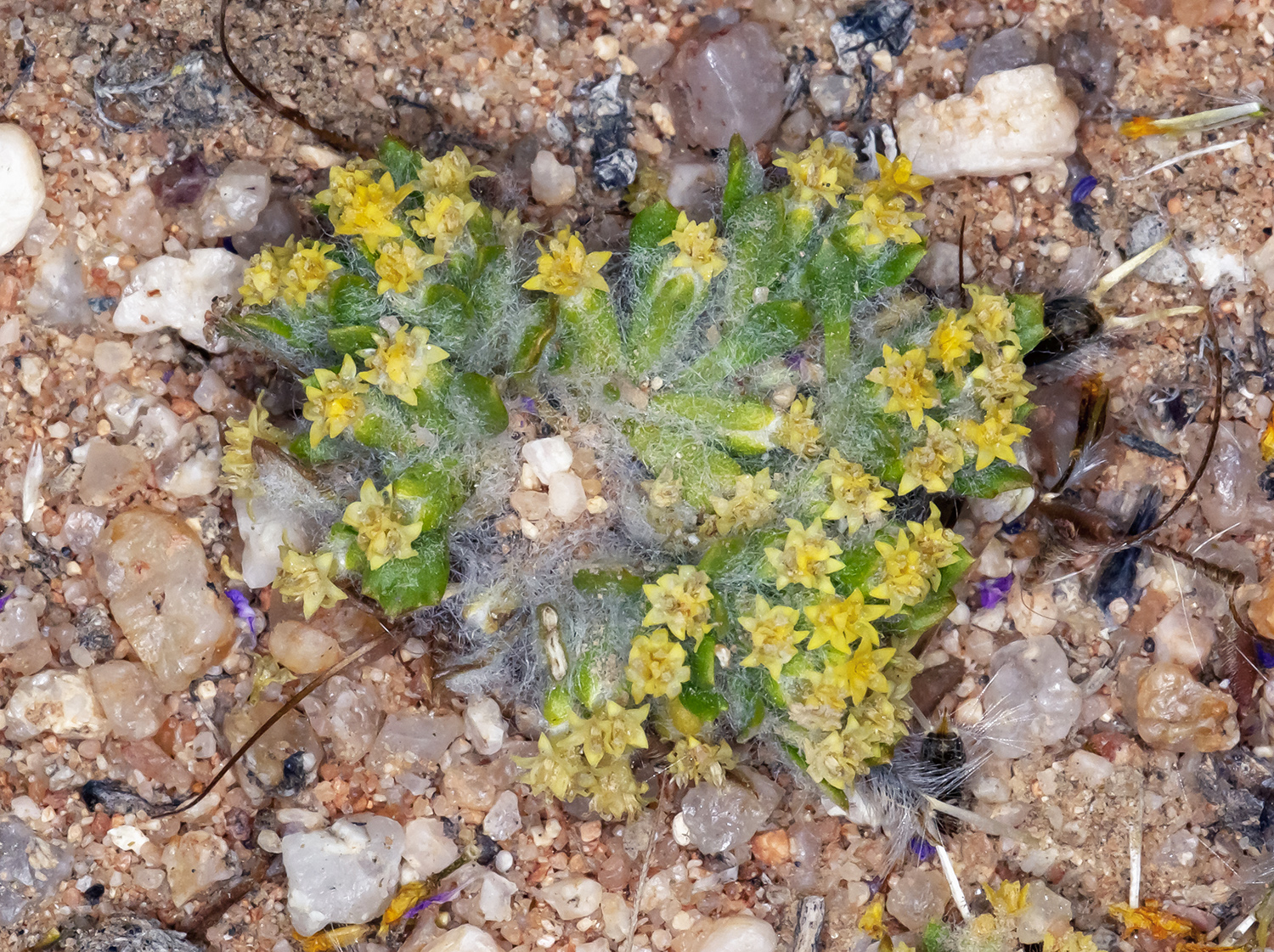

Conservation status
- Imperiled (NatureServe)

Scientific classification
- Kingdom: Plantae
- Clade: Embryophytes
- Clade: Tracheophytes
- Clade: Angiosperms
- Clade: Eudicots
- Clade: Asterids
- Order: Asterales
- Family: Asteraceae
- Genus: Eriophyllum
- Species: E. mohavense

Binomial name
- Eriophyllum mohavense (I.M.Johnst.) Jeps. 1925

Synonyms
- Eremonanus mohavensis I.M.Johnst. 1923

= Eriophyllum mohavense =

Species of flowering plant

Eriophyllum mohavense, also known as the Mojave woolly sunflower or the Barstow woolly sunflower, is a rare species of small annual flowering plant in the family Asteraceae, found only (endemic) in the Mojave Desert of California.

== Range and habitat ==
Eriophyllum mohavense grows in open loamy, gravelly, or clay soils of the Mojave Desert. It grows between 1,500 and 3,000 feet (450–900 meters) elevation. It can be found in creosote bush scrub and saltbush scrub plant communities. It has been found in Kramer Hills, Boron, around Harper Dry Lake, Opal Mountain, Cuddleback Lake, and Kramer Junction. Some populations have been found within the boundaries of Edwards Air Force Base and Joshua Tree National Park.

== Description ==
This is a tiny annual herb forming woolly tufts only 1 to 3 centimeters (0.4-1.2 inches) tall. It is covered with long wooly hairs. There are a few lobed, pointed leaves at the base of the tuft, no more than a centimeter (0.4 inches) long each. The leaves are spoon-shaped, sometimes having 3 pointed teeth near the wider tip. The plant produces cylindrical flower heads just a few millimeters wide, containing usually 3-4 bright yellow disc flowers. The phyllaries (green bracts surrounding the flower head) are concave. The disc florets have ray-like lobes, but there are no true ray flowers. The fruit is an achene about half a centimeter long including a short pappus.

== Conservation status ==
This plant is illustrative of problems with conducting botanical inventories of annuals in deserts. Seeds may lay in the ground for years, waiting for the right germination conditions. Aboveground plants may be absent for years, creating the false impression that plants populations are no longer present.

It is threatened in almost its entire range, by military activities, grazing, off-road vehicles, and energy development. It meets the criteria for listing to be protected, but as of 2014 has not been given legal protection.
