= Princess pine =

Princess pine may refer to:

- Crassula muscosa also named Crassula lycopodioides or Crassula pseudolycopodioides, is a succulent plant native to South Africa and belonging to the family of Crassulaceae and to the genus Crassula. It is common as a houseplant worldwide and is commonly known as Rattail Crassula, Watch Chain, Lizard's Tail, Zipper Plant and Princess Pine.
- Lycopodium, a genus of clubmosses in the family Lycopodiaceae, a family of fern-allies; also, specifically:
  - Lycopodium obscurum, also known as Ground Pine, native to eastern North America
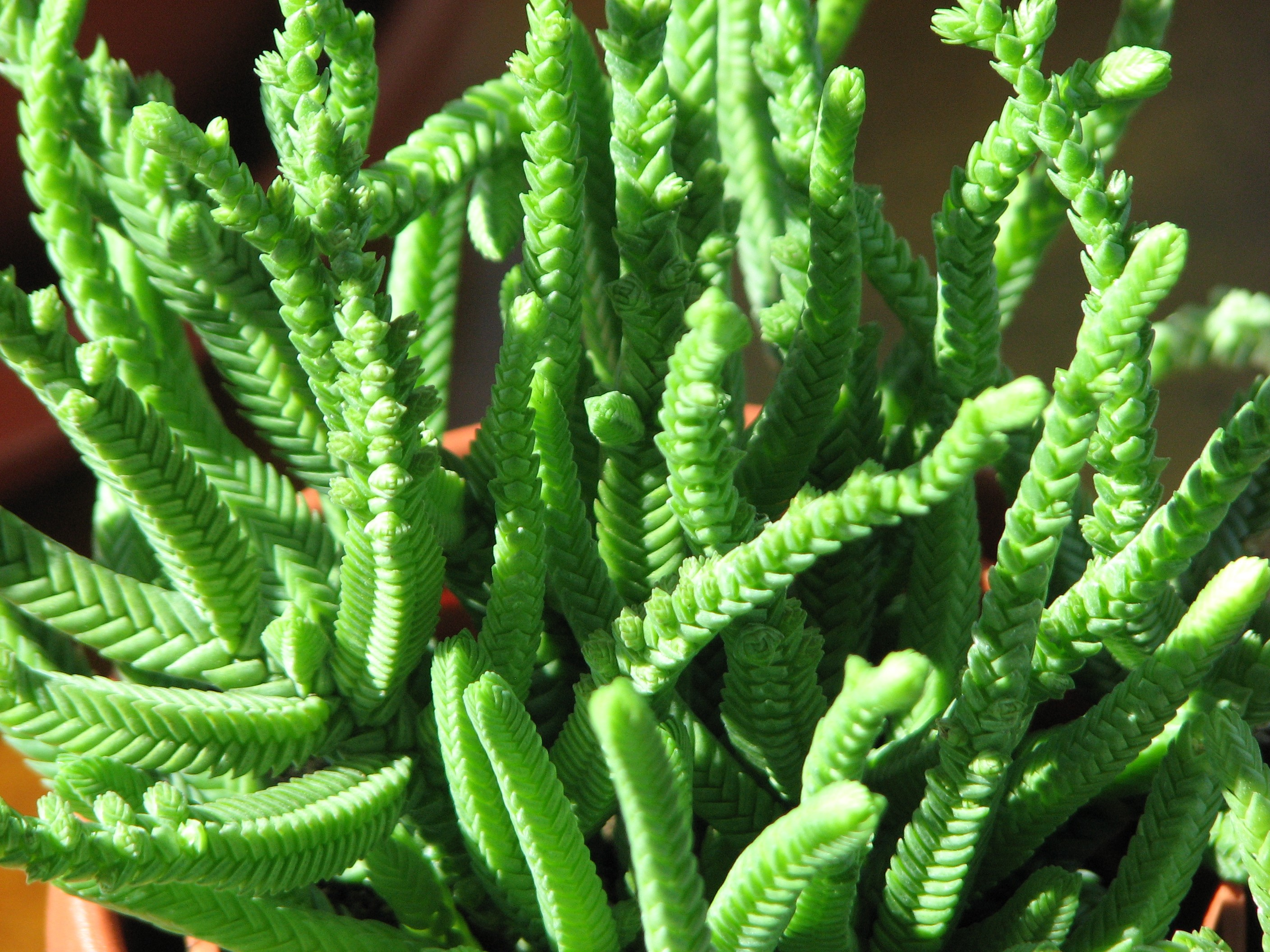
Crassula muscosa

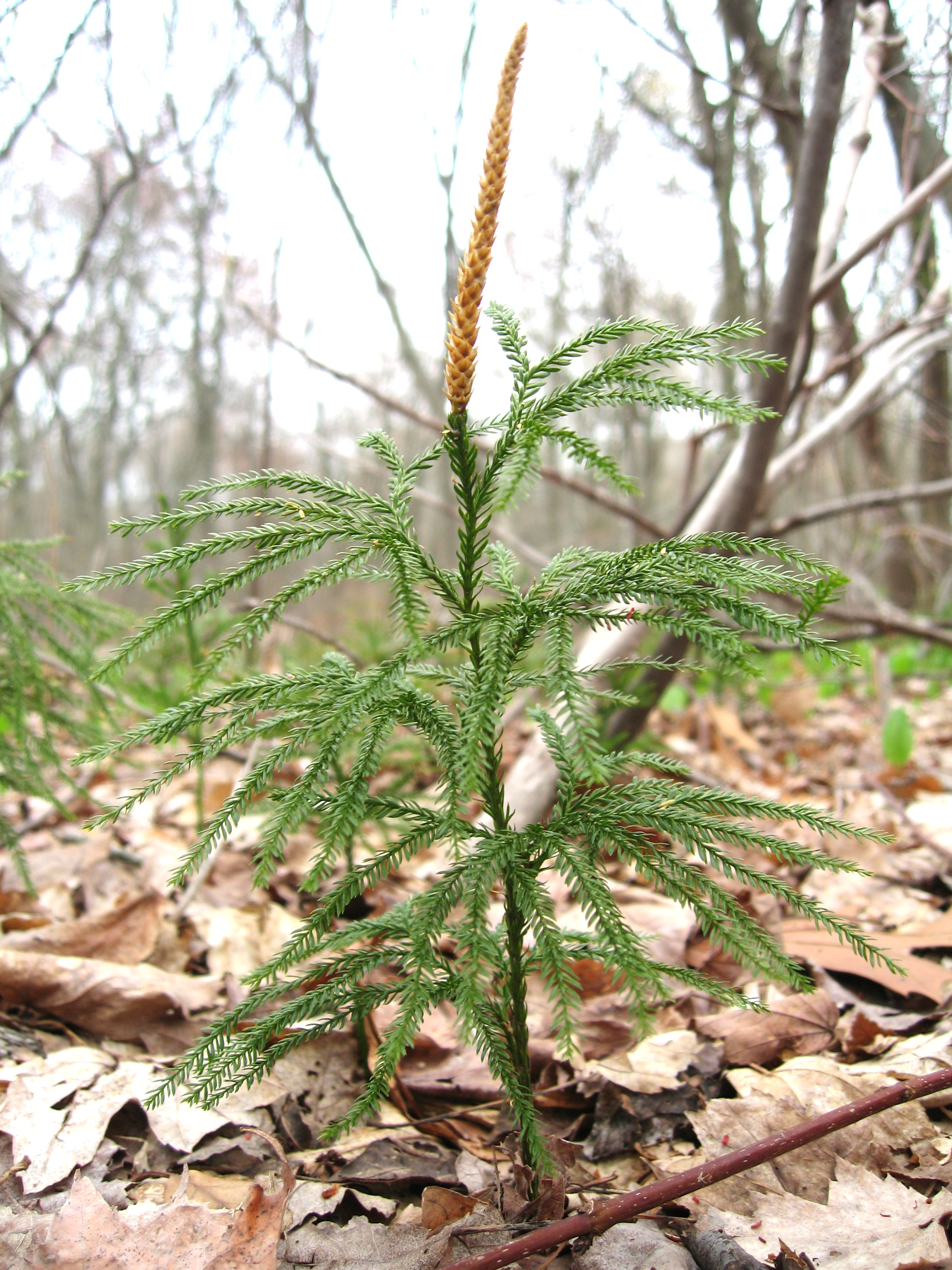
Lycopodium obscurum

== See also ==
- Prince's pine
