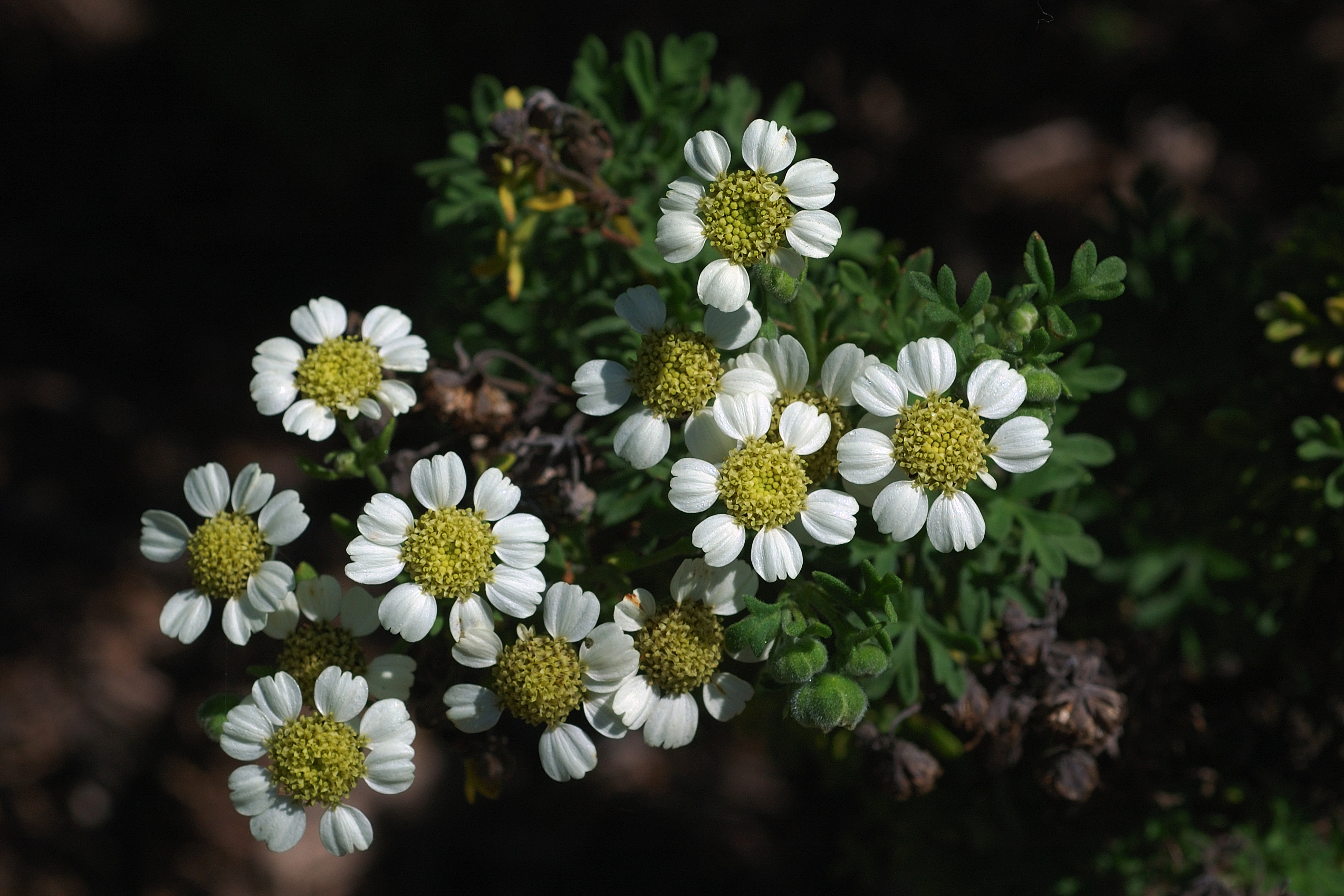

Scientific classification
- Kingdom: Plantae
- Clade: Tracheophytes
- Clade: Angiosperms
- Clade: Eudicots
- Clade: Asterids
- Order: Asterales
- Family: Asteraceae
- Genus: Eriophyllum
- Species: E. ambrosiodes

Binomial name
- Eriophyllum ambrosiodes (Lag.) Kuntze

Synonyms
- Achyropappus maritimus Poepp. ex DC.; Bahia ambrosioides Lag. (1816) (basionym); Stylesia ambrosioides (Lag.) Nutt.; Stylesia puberula Nutt.

= Eriophyllum ambrosiodes =

Species of flowering plant

Eriophyllum ambrosiodes is a South American species of flowering plants in the family Asteraceae. It is native to northern and central Chile including the Juan Fernández Islands.
