= Shadscale scrub =

Shadscale scrub is a plant community and vegetation type that occurs in upper elevations of the Mojave Desert and lower elevations of the Great Basin ecoregion or biome, characterized by salt tolerant plants—halophytes.

It is located at higher elevations than the saltbush scrub plant community, but shares some of its plant species.

== Flora ==
The shadscale scrub vegetation type commonly includes:

- hop-sage (Grayia spinosa)
- winter fat (Krascheninnikovia lanata).

Shared members with higher elevation saltbush scrub include:

- goosefoot family (Chenopodiaceae) members
- four-wing saltbrush (Atriplex canescens
- shadscale (Atriplex confertifolia)
- cattle spinach, or all-scale (Atriplex polycarpa).

Other species can include:

- Calochortus excavatus — Inyo County star tulip.

== See also ==
- Saltbush scrub plant community
- Natural history of the Mojave Desert
- Flora of the California desert regions
