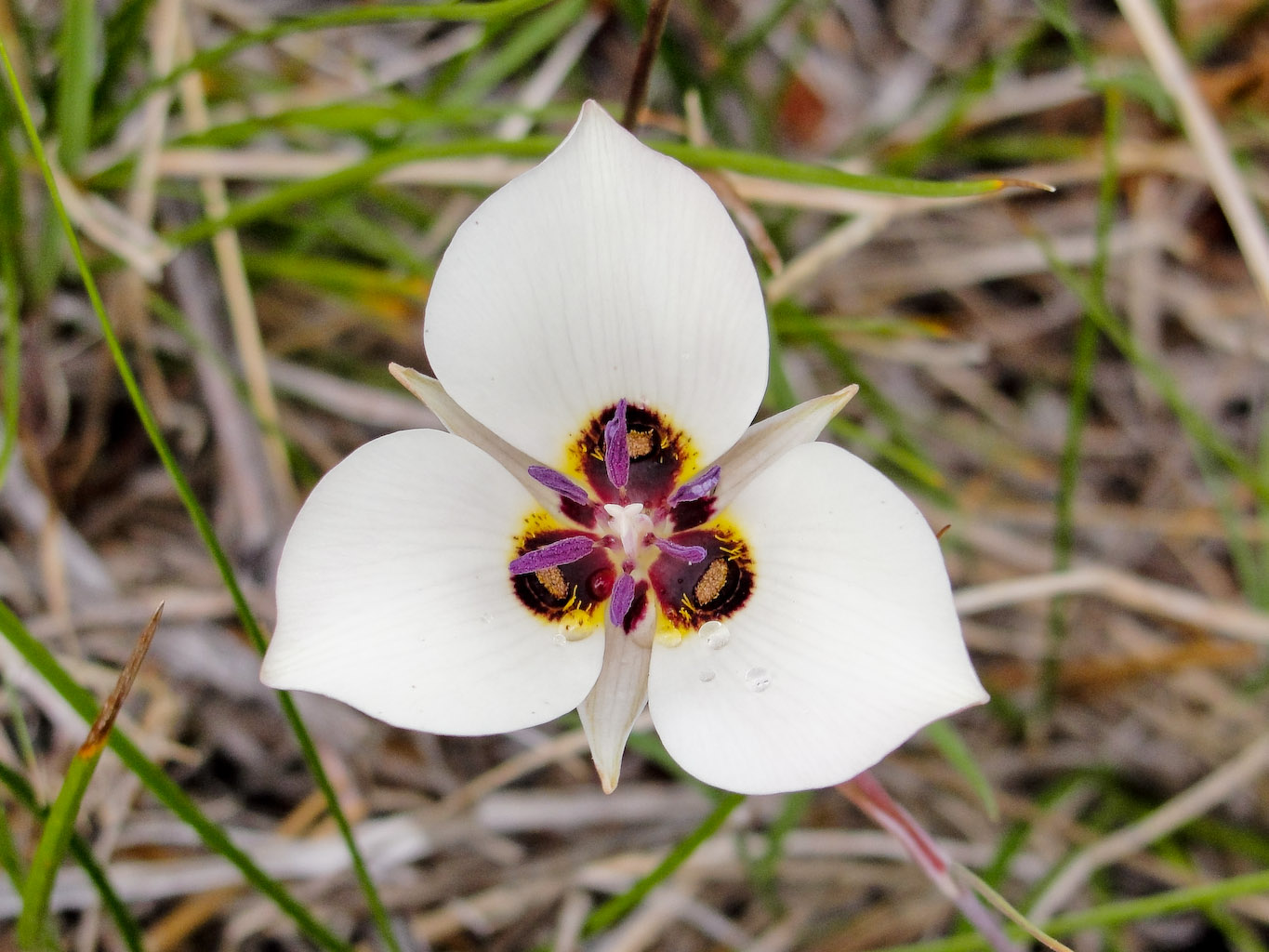

Conservation status
- Imperiled (NatureServe)

Scientific classification
- Kingdom: Plantae
- Clade: Embryophytes
- Clade: Tracheophytes
- Clade: Spermatophytes
- Clade: Angiosperms
- Clade: Monocots
- Order: Liliales
- Family: Liliaceae
- Genus: Calochortus
- Species: C. excavatus

Binomial name
- Calochortus excavatus Greene

Synonyms
- Calochortus campestris Davidson

= Calochortus excavatus =

Plant species in the lily family

Calochortus excavatus is a species of flowering plant in the lily family known by the common name Inyo County star-tulip.

== Description ==
Calochortus excavatus is a perennial bulb, growing a slender unbranched stem to about 30 centimetres (12 in) in maximum height.

The inflorescence bears 1 to 6 erect bell-shaped flowers in a close cluster. Each flower has three sepals which lack spotting, and three white petals. The petals may have green striping on their outer surfaces and generally have a red-purple blotch at the base. The anthers are reddish to purple.

== Taxonomy ==
Calochortus excavatus was scientifically described and named by Edward Lee Greene in 1890. The species is part of the Calochortus genus within the Liliaceae family. It has one heterotypic synonym, Calochortus campestris, created in 1915 by Anstruther Davidson.

== Distribution ==
The flowering plant is endemic to eastern California, where it is known from several reduced and threatened populations in Mono and Inyo Counties. It occupies grassy habitats in alkaline Shadscale scrub plant communities, alongside Atriplex and other playa halophyte flora, primarily in Owens Valley.

The species is listed as endangered, threatened by the loss of local groundwater.
