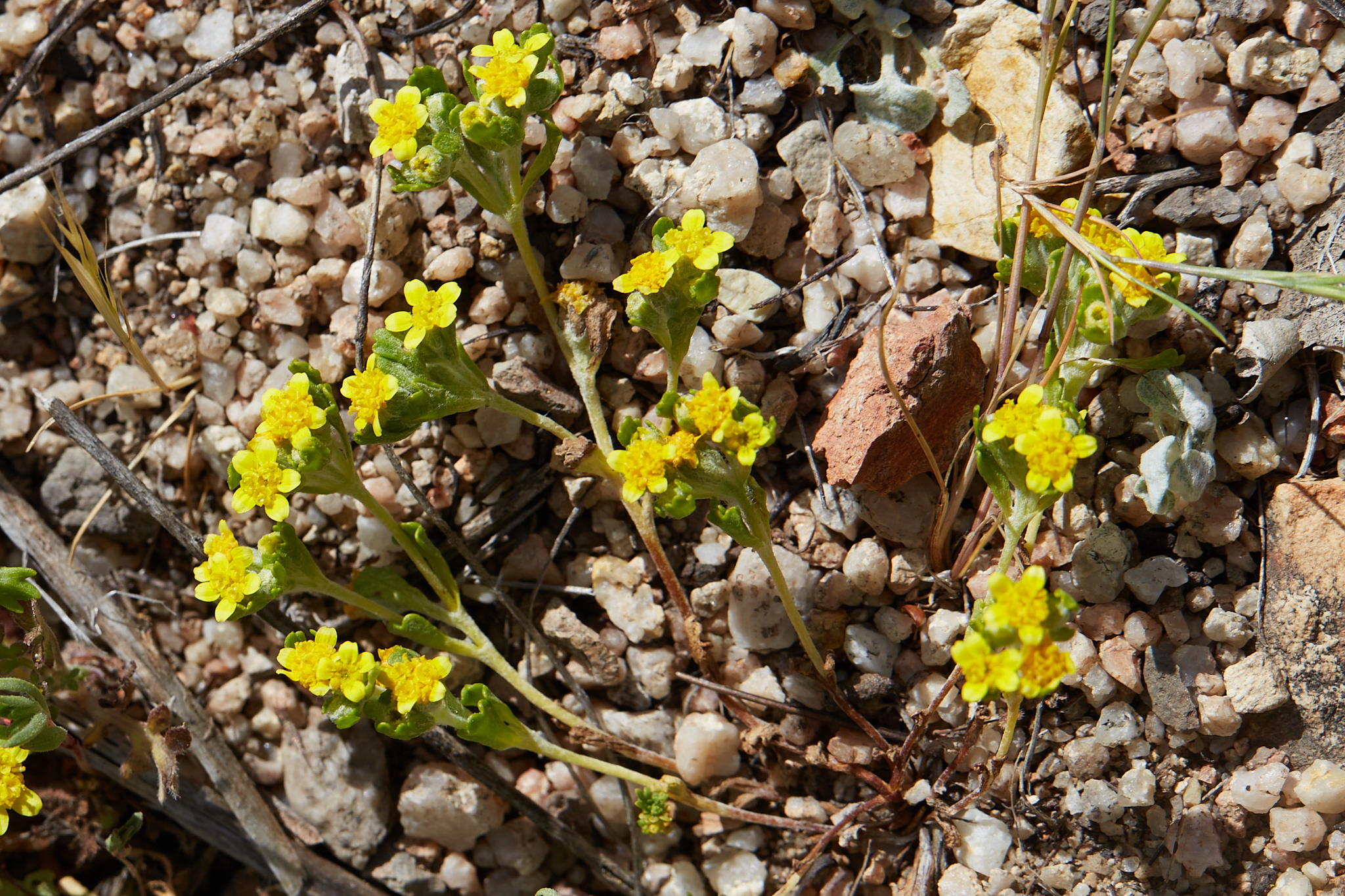

Scientific classification
- Kingdom: Plantae
- Clade: Tracheophytes
- Clade: Angiosperms
- Clade: Eudicots
- Clade: Asterids
- Order: Asterales
- Family: Asteraceae
- Genus: Eriophyllum
- Species: E. multicaule

Binomial name
- Eriophyllum multicaule (DC.) Gray 1883

Synonyms
- Actinolepis multicaulis DC. 1836

= Eriophyllum multicaule =

Species of flowering plant

Eriophyllum multicaule is a North American flowering plant in the family Asteraceae, known by the common name manystem woolly sunflower. It is native to California and Arizona in the southwestern United States.

Eriophyllum multicaule grows in chaparral habitat, especially along the California coast. This is a small, branching, clump-forming annual herb rarely more than 15 cm (6 inches) tall. It has fleshy stems and foliage in shades of bright green to purplish green. The small leaves are about one centimeter (0.4 inches) long, sometimes woolly, and shaped like a wedge with three small teeth at the end. The inflorescences at the ends of the stems are clusters of tiny flower heads, each bright golden yellow with a center of 10-20 disc florets surrounded by 5-7 ray florets each about two millimeters (0.08 inches) long.
