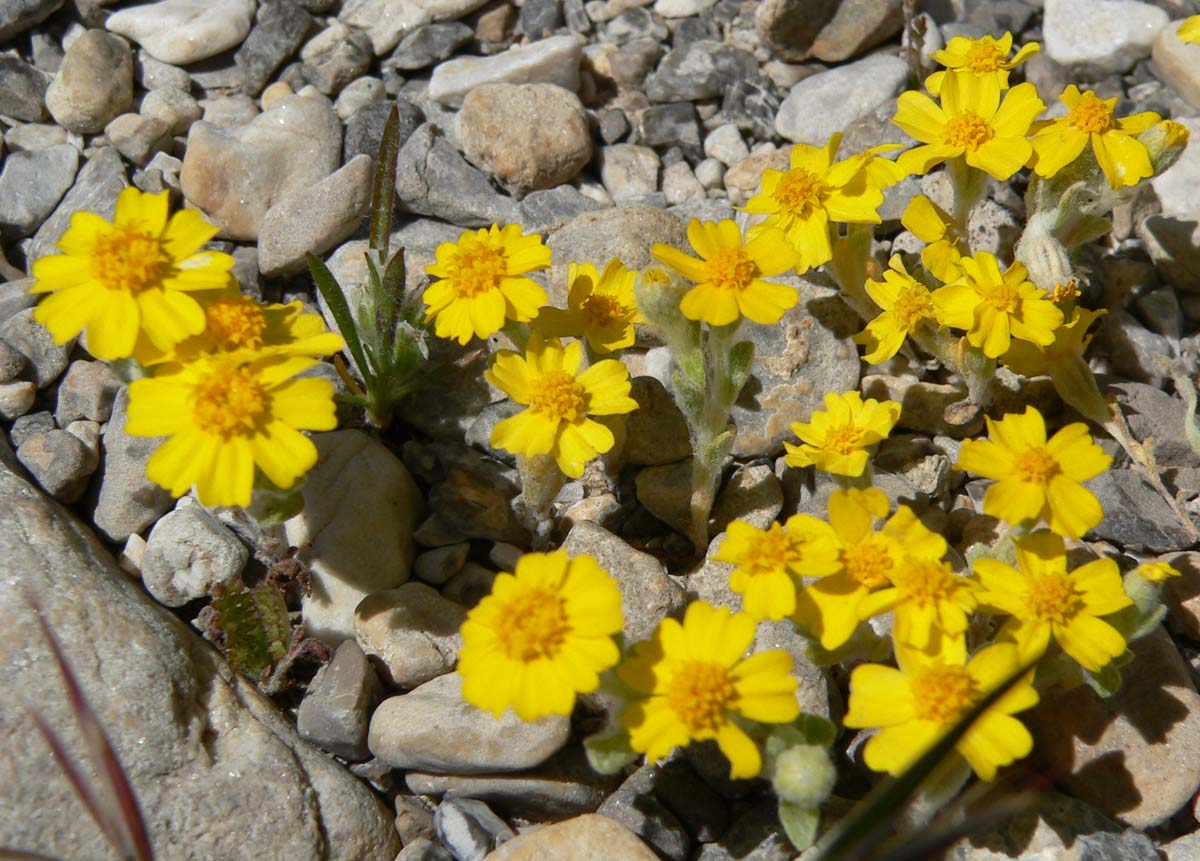

Scientific classification
- Kingdom: Plantae
- Clade: Tracheophytes
- Clade: Angiosperms
- Clade: Eudicots
- Clade: Asterids
- Order: Asterales
- Family: Asteraceae
- Genus: Eriophyllum
- Species: E. wallacei

Binomial name
- Eriophyllum wallacei (Gray) Rydb.

Synonyms
- Bahia wallacei A. Gray 1857; Actinolepis wallacei (A. Gray) A. Gray; Antheropeas wallacei (A. Gray) Rydb.; Antheropeas australe Rydb.; Bahia rubella A.Gray; Eriophyllum aureum Brandegee

= Eriophyllum wallacei =

Species of flowering plant

Eriophyllum wallacei is a North American flowering plant in the family Asteraceae known by the common names woolly daisy and woolly easterbonnets. It grows in the southwestern United States (Arizona, Utah, Nevada, and California, with an isolated population in Wyoming) and northwestern Mexico (northern Baja California). It may grow in clumps or on short erect stems in sand, rocks, and gravel.

It is a small, squat annual herb rarely more than 15 centimetres (6 inches) tall. The plant is covered in masses of white cotton-candy-like wool and has small oval leaves up to 2 cm (1 in) long. Between March and June it produces one flower head per stem, about 6 millimetres (1/4 in) wide and each with 5–10 yellow or cream-colored ray florets. The rays are about 3 mm (1/8 in) long and sometimes have red veins, surrounding 20–30 yellow disc florets. The seed is black and narrow.

In drier conditions, the plant tends to grow a single stem to ensure its reproduction via seed. With more moisture, it branches from the base into multiple stalks.
