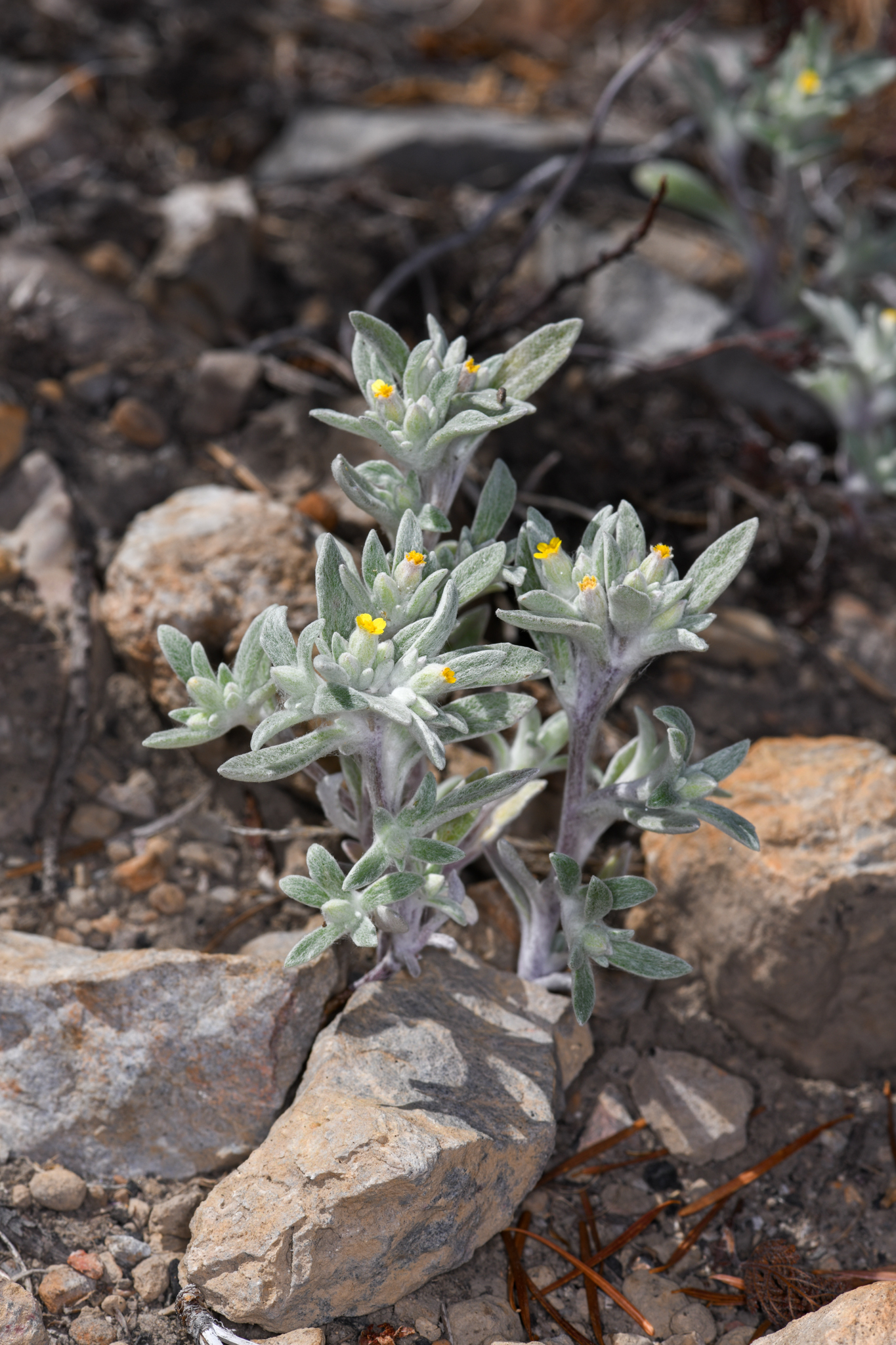
- E. nubigenum

Conservation status
- Imperiled (NatureServe)

Scientific classification
- Kingdom: Plantae
- Clade: Tracheophytes
- Clade: Angiosperms
- Clade: Eudicots
- Clade: Asterids
- Order: Asterales
- Family: Asteraceae
- Genus: Eriophyllum
- Species: E. nubigenum

Binomial name
- Eriophyllum nubigenum Greene ex A.Gray

Synonyms
- Actinolepis nubigena (Greene ex A. Gray) Greene

= Eriophyllum nubigenum =

Species of flowering plant

Eriophyllum nubigenum, the Yosemite woolly sunflower, is an uncommon flowering plant in the family Asteraceae. It is endemic to California, where it is known only from the Sierra Nevada in and around Yosemite National Park (in Tuolumne County and Mariposa County).

== Description ==
Eriophyllum nubigenum is an annual herb with a densely woolly stem up to 15 centimeters (6 inches) tall. The oblong leaves are one to two centimeters (0.4-0.8 inches) long, untoothed, and woolly in texture. The inflorescence is a cluster of small golden yellow flower heads with 4-6 one-millimeter-long ray florets surrounding 10–20 disc florets.
