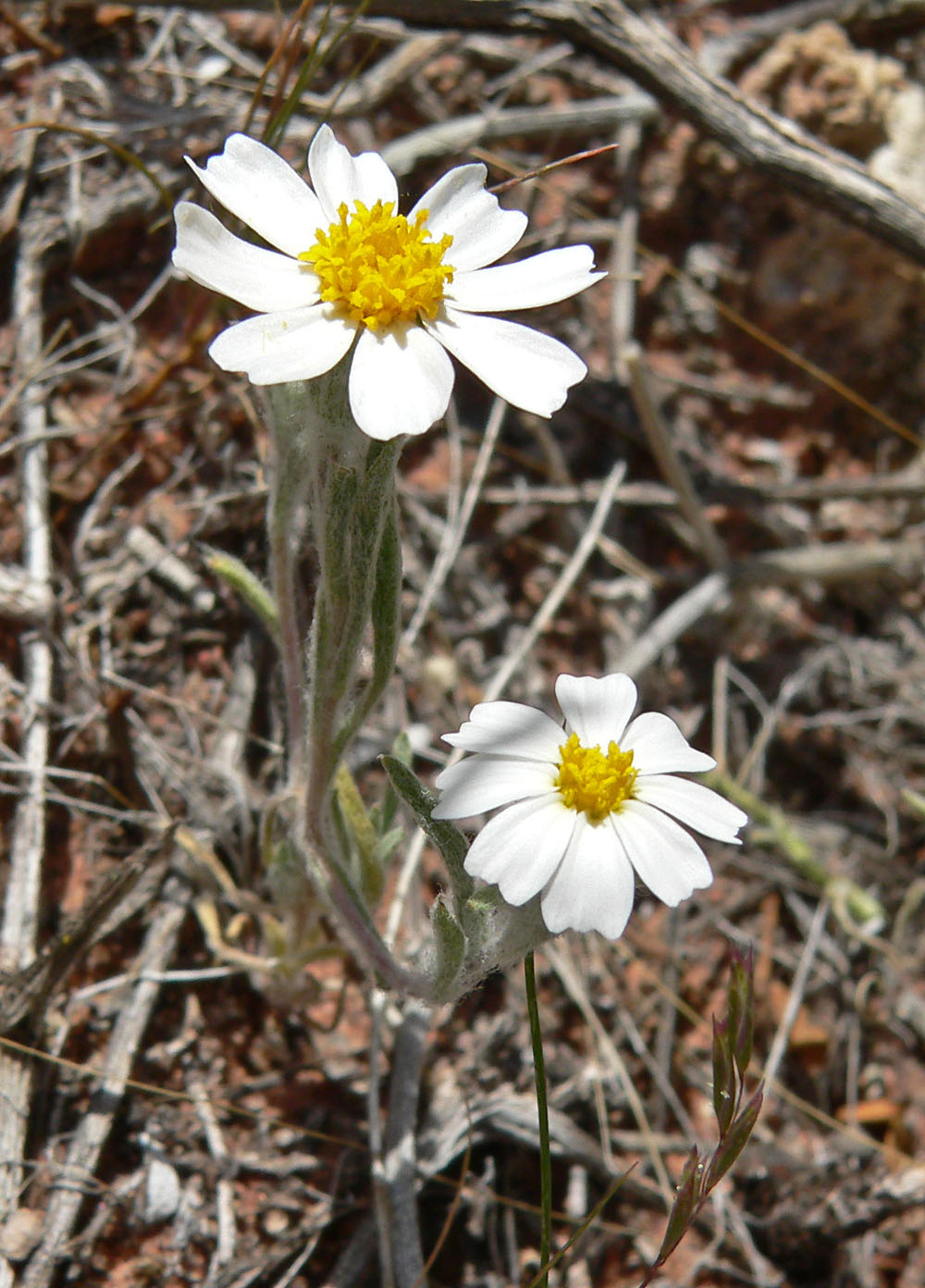

Scientific classification
- Kingdom: Plantae
- Clade: Tracheophytes
- Clade: Angiosperms
- Clade: Eudicots
- Clade: Asterids
- Order: Asterales
- Family: Asteraceae
- Genus: Eriophyllum
- Species: E. lanosum

Binomial name
- Eriophyllum lanosum (A.Gray) A.Gray

Synonyms
- Actinolepis lanosa (A.Gray) A.Gray; Antheropeas lanosum (A.Gray) Rydb.; Burrielia lanosa A.Gray

= Eriophyllum lanosum =

Species of flowering plant

Eriophyllum lanosum, the white woolly daisy or white easterbonnets, is a spring wildflower in the family Asteraceae. It grows in the eastern Mojave Desert and the Sonoran Desert in the southwestern United States (California, Arizona, Nevada, Utah, New Mexico) and northwestern Mexico (Baja California + Sonora).

Eriophyllum lanosum is a small annual plant, rarely reaching a height of more than 10 cm (3.9 inches). The plant is often unnoticed because it blends in with gravel and sand. It has a white-woolly stem and moderately woolly leaves. The plant produces one flower head per flowering stalk. Each head has 8–10 ray florets, white with red veins. These surround 10–20 tiny yellow disc florets.
