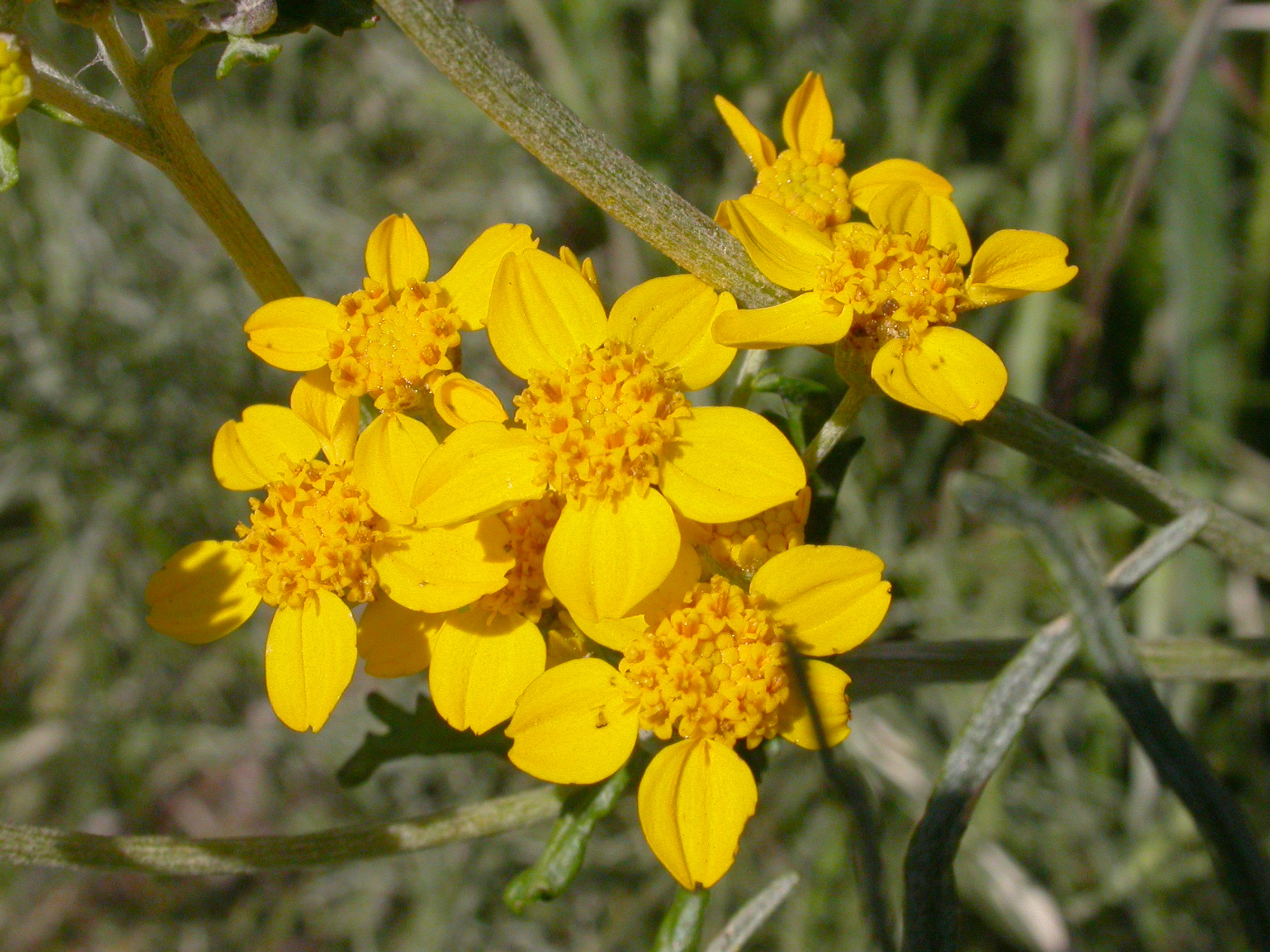
- Eriophyllum confertiflorum Voorhis Ecological Reserve; California State Polytechnic University, Pomona

Scientific classification
- Kingdom: Plantae
- Clade: Embryophytes
- Clade: Tracheophytes
- Clade: Angiosperms
- Clade: Eudicots
- Clade: Asterids
- Order: Asterales
- Family: Asteraceae
- Subfamily: Asteroideae
- Tribe: Madieae
- Subtribe: Baeriinae
- Genus: Eriophyllum; Lag.

Type species
- Eriophyllum staechadifolium Lag.

Synonyms
- Actinolepis DC.; Antheropeas Rydb.; Bahia Lag.; Eremonanus I.M.Johnst.; Phialis Spreng.; Stylesia Nutt.; Trichophyllum Nutt.

= Eriophyllum =

Genus of flowering plants

Eriophyllum, commonly known as the woolly sunflower, is a North American genus of plants in the family Asteraceae. The genus is native to western North America (USA, Canada, northwestern Mexico), with a concentration of narrow endemics in California.

Eriophyllum species are used as food plants by the larvae of some Lepidoptera species including Phymatopus californicus.

== Description ==
Eriophyllum is an annual or perennial shrub or subshrub, some species growing to a height of 200 cm (6.7 feet). Leaves present generally alternate and entire to nearly compound, with woolly hairs on some of the species. The inflorescence contains numerous yellow flower heads in flat-topped clusters. The involucre structure is obconic to hemispheric. Phyllaries are either free or more or less fused; the receptacle presents typically flat, but naked. The ray flowers are present in some species but not in others. Fruits are angled in the outer flowers, but are generally club-shaped for the inner flowers; the pappus is somewhat jagged.

== Species ==
14 species are accepted.

- Eriophyllum ambiguum (A.Gray) A.Gray – California, Arizona, Nevada
- Eriophyllum ambrosiodes (Lag.) Kuntze – northern and central Chile and Juan Fernández Islands
- Eriophyllum confertiflorum (DC.) A.Gray – California, Baja California
- Eriophyllum congdonii Brandegee – California
- Eriophyllum jepsonii Greene – California
- Eriophyllum lanatum (Pursh) J.Forbes – British Columbia, western USA
- Eriophyllum lanosum (A.Gray) A.Gray – Baja California, southwestern USA
- Eriophyllum latilobum Rydb. – California
- Eriophyllum mohavense (I.M.Johnst.) Jeps. – California
- Eriophyllum multicaule (DC.) A.Gray – California, Arizona
- Eriophyllum nubigenum Greene ex A.Gray – California
- Eriophyllum pringlei A.Gray – Baja California, California, Arizona, Nevada
- Eriophyllum staechadifolium Lag. – California, Oregon
- Eriophyllum wallacei (A.Gray) A.Gray – Arizona, Baja California, California, Nevada, and Utah
