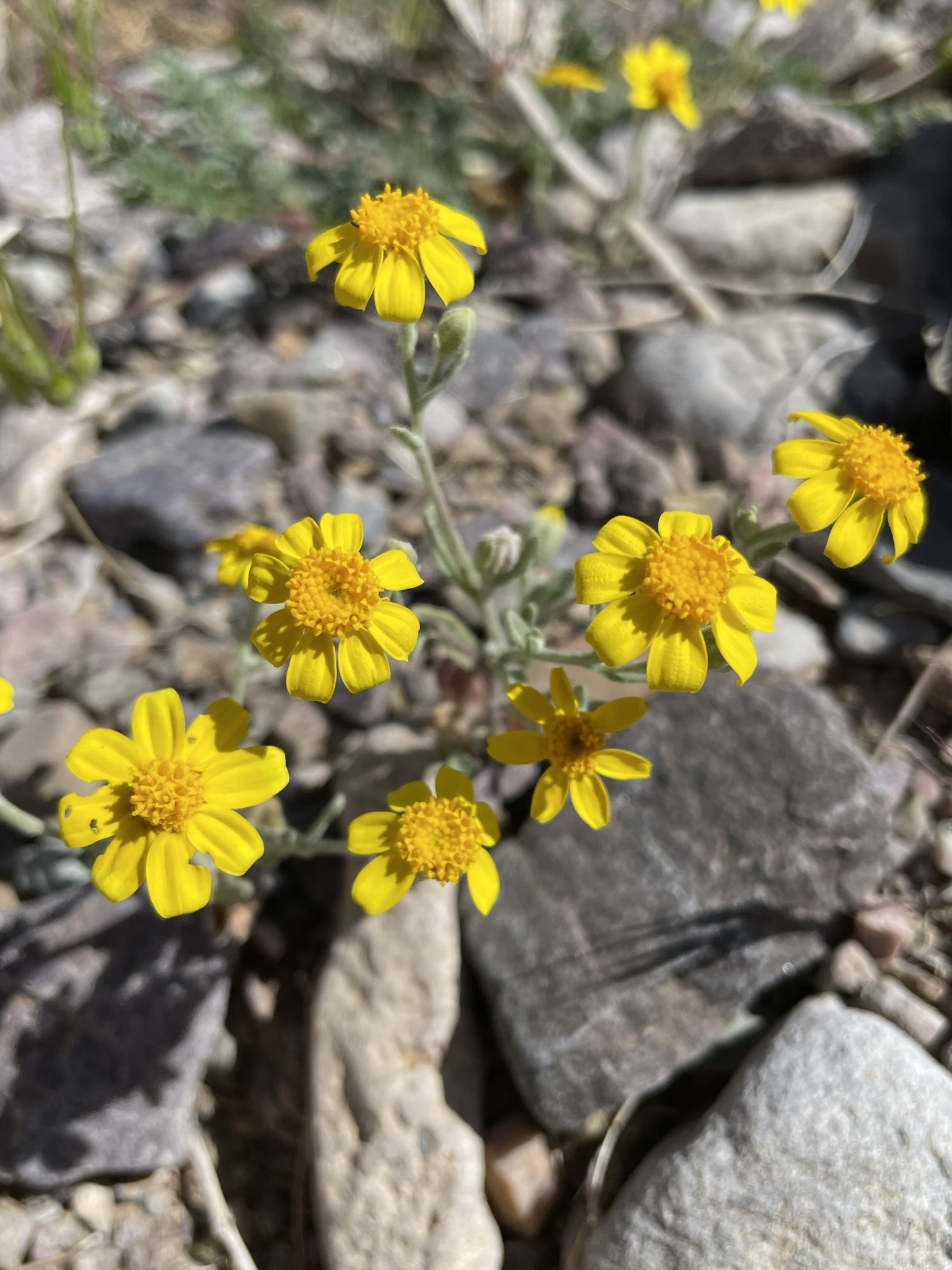

Scientific classification
- Kingdom: Plantae
- Clade: Tracheophytes
- Clade: Angiosperms
- Clade: Eudicots
- Clade: Asterids
- Order: Asterales
- Family: Asteraceae
- Genus: Eriophyllum
- Species: E. ambiguum

Binomial name
- Eriophyllum ambiguum A.Gray

Synonyms
- Bahia ambigua (A.Gray) A.Gray; Bahia parviflora A.Gray; Eriophyllum parishii H.M.Hall ex Constance; Eriophyllum parviflorum (A.Gray) Rydb.; Lasthenia ambigua A.Gray; Eriophyllum paleaceum Brandegee, syn of var. paleaceum

= Eriophyllum ambiguum =

Species of flowering plant

Eriophyllum ambiguum is a species of flowering plant in the family Asteraceae known by the common name beautiful woolly sunflower. It is native to the deserts and adjacent hills of southern and eastern California, northwestern Arizona, and southern Nevada.

Eriophyllum ambiguum grows in chaparral, woodlands, and desert habitat. It is an annual herb growing decumbent or upright with stems up to 30 centimeters (1 foot) long. The leaves are widely lance-shaped or oblong and sometimes have lobes, with woolly hairs on both sides. The inflorescence produces one flower head containing many yellow disc florets and 6 to 10 yellow, white, or bicolored ray florets which are each 2 millimeters to one centimeter (0.08-0.40 inches) long. The fruit is a rough-haired achene which may have a very small pappus.

Varieties

- Eriophyllum ambiguum var. ambiguum - California, mostly in Kern County
- Eriophyllum ambiguum var. paleaceum (Brandegee) Ferris - California, Nevada, Arizona
