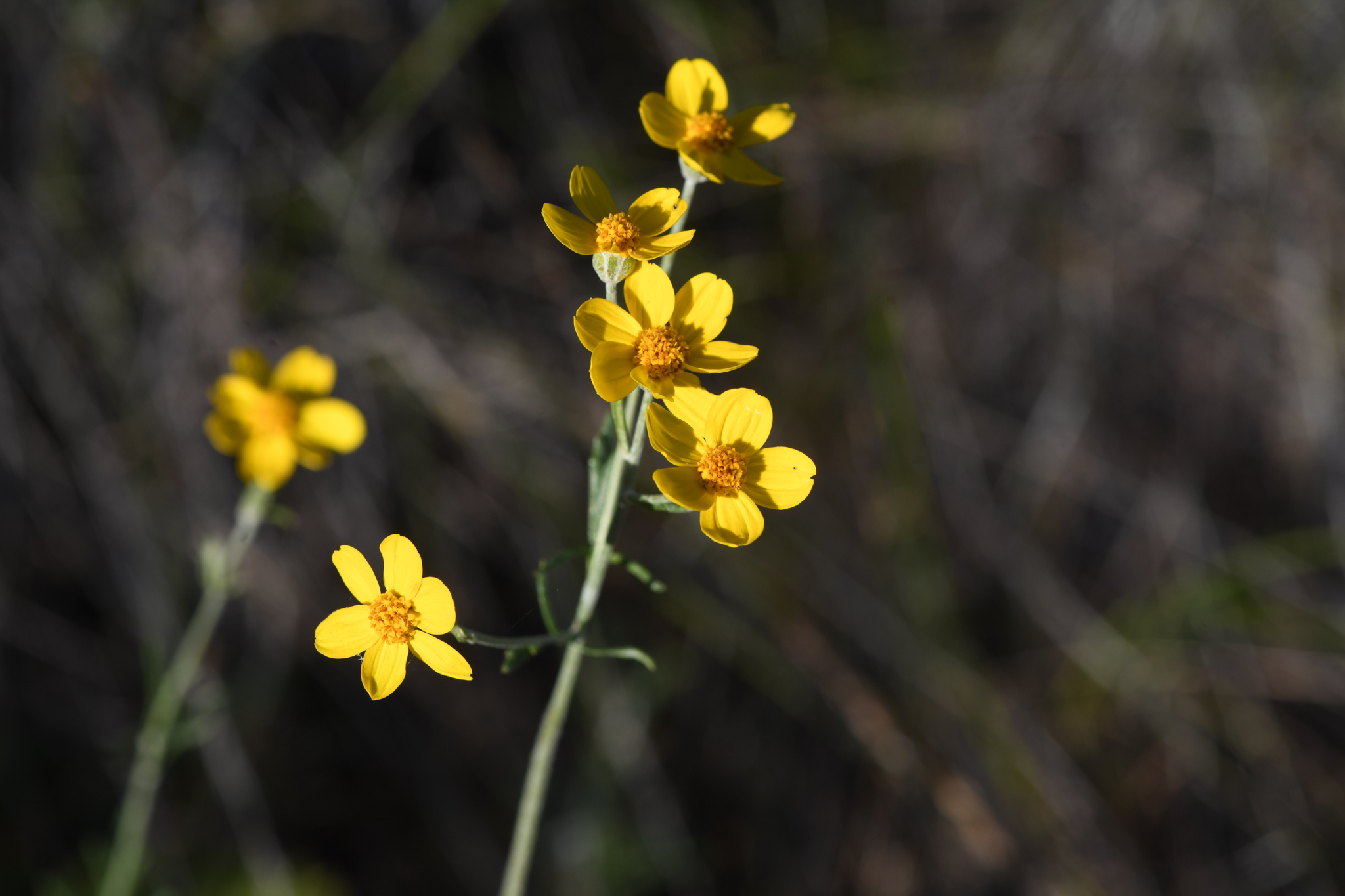

Scientific classification
- Kingdom: Plantae
- Clade: Tracheophytes
- Clade: Angiosperms
- Clade: Eudicots
- Clade: Asterids
- Order: Asterales
- Family: Asteraceae
- Genus: Eriophyllum
- Species: E. jepsonii

Binomial name
- Eriophyllum jepsonii Greene

= Eriophyllum jepsonii =

Species of flowering plant

Eriophyllum jepsonii is a rare North American species of flowering plant in the family Asteraceae known by the common name Jepson's woolly sunflower. It is endemic to California, where it has been found in the Central Coast Ranges and adjacent hills from Contra Costa County to Ventura County.

Eriophyllum jepsonii grows in dry habitat such as chaparral and oak woodland. This is a small shrub producing woolly, whitish stems 50 to 80 centimeters (20-32 inches) tall. It is lined with lobed oval leaves each a few centimeters long and coated in woolly fibers. The inflorescence produces one or more flower heads containing many glandular or bristly yellowish disc florets surrounded 6 to 8 yellow ray florets each up to a centimeter long. The fruit is an achene tipped with a pappus of approximately 8 scales.
