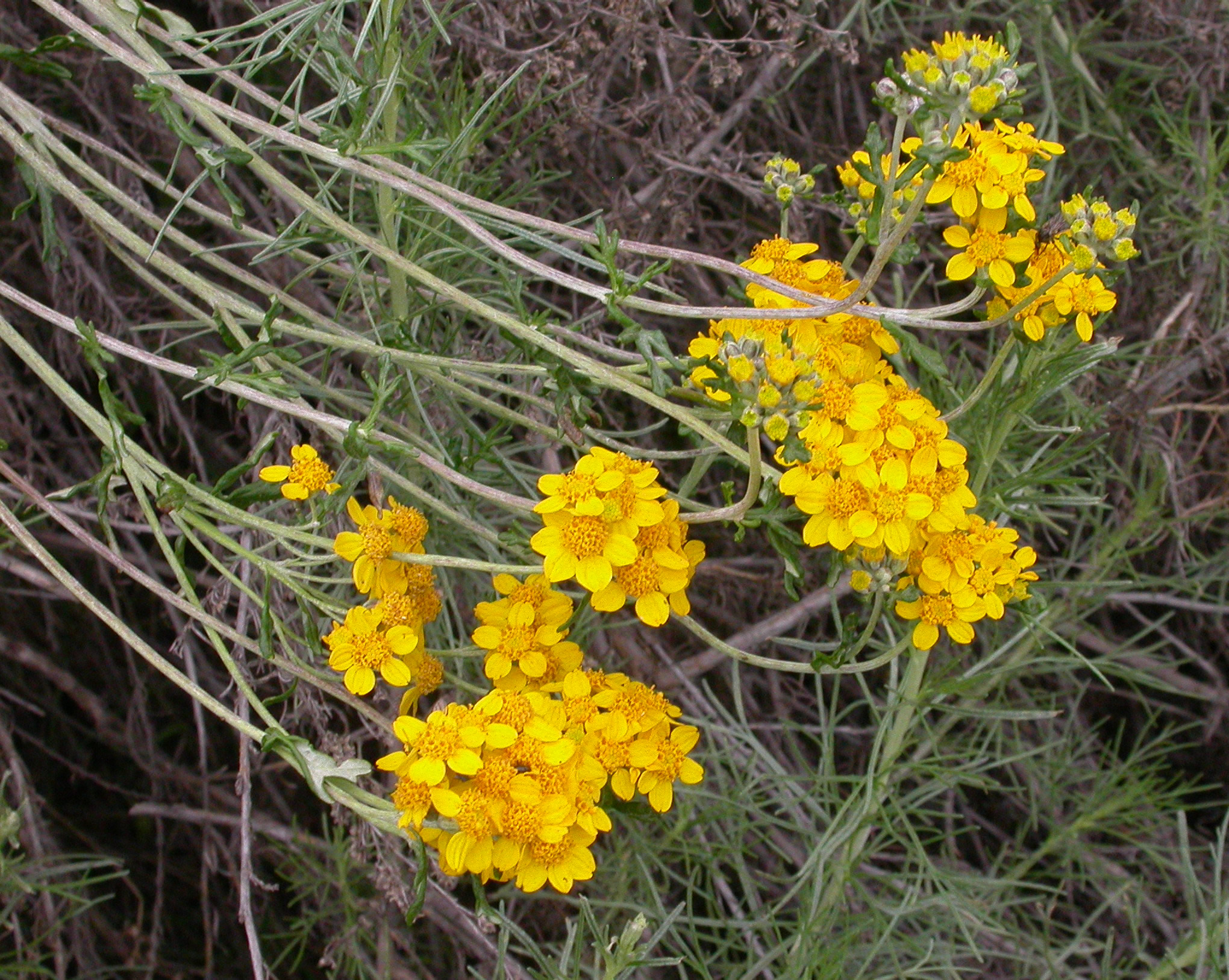

Scientific classification
- Kingdom: Plantae
- Clade: Tracheophytes
- Clade: Angiosperms
- Clade: Eudicots
- Clade: Asterids
- Order: Asterales
- Family: Asteraceae
- Genus: Eriophyllum
- Species: E. confertiflorum

Binomial name
- Eriophyllum confertiflorum (DC.) Gray

Synonyms
- Synonymy: Bahia confertiflora DC. 1836; Bahia tenuifolia DC.; Eriophyllum cheiranthoides Rydb.; Eriophyllum crucigerum Rydb.; Eriophyllum tenuifolium (DC.) Rydb.; Eriophyllum tanacetiflorum Greene, syn of var. tanacetiflorum; Bahia trifida Nutt., syn of var. trifidum; Eriophyllum trifidum (Nutt.) Rydb., syn of var. trifidum

= Eriophyllum confertiflorum =

Species of flowering plant

Eriophyllum confertiflorum, commonly called golden yarrow or yellow yarrow, is a North American species of plant in the family Asteraceae, native to California and Baja California. It has wooly leaves when young, and yellow flower heads. "Eriophyllum" means "wooly leaved."

Eriophyllum confertiflorum gets its common name from the similar appearance of its inflorescence to the true yarrow, which has white flowers.

== Habitat and distribution ==
Eriophyllum confertiflorum is a highly variable plant which is generally a small shrub. It grows primarily in the Sierra Nevada and Coastal Ranges in California and Baja California. It can be found in a number of plant communities and habitats. In the Santa Monica Mountains of California, it is common in open places that are away from the coast.

Eriophyllum confertiflorum grows in large clumps or stands of many erect stems often exceeding 50 cm (20 in) in height. Botanist Nancy Dale describes the growth pattern as "tidy". Leaves are alternate. Leaves and stems are whitish when young, because of being covered in wooly white hairs, then become greenish to gray-green. Leaves have 3-5 deep lobes. Yellow flowers are crowded in the head, which is up to 3/8 inch (0.95 cm) across, flat-topped, with both disc flowers and ray flowers. "Confertiflorum" means densely flowered. It blooms from January to July. The fruit is an achene with a very short pappus. The top of each stem forms an inflorescence of up to 30 flower heads, each bright golden yellow head with a large center of disc florets and usually a fringe of rounded to oval ray florets.

Varieties

- Eriophyllum confertiflorum var. confertiflorum - most of species range
- Eriophyllum confertiflorum var. tanacetiflorum (Greene) Jeps. - Sierra Nevada foothills + San Gabriel Mountains
- Eriophyllum confertiflorum var. trifidum (Nutt.) A.Gray - California coast between Santa Barbara + Monterey

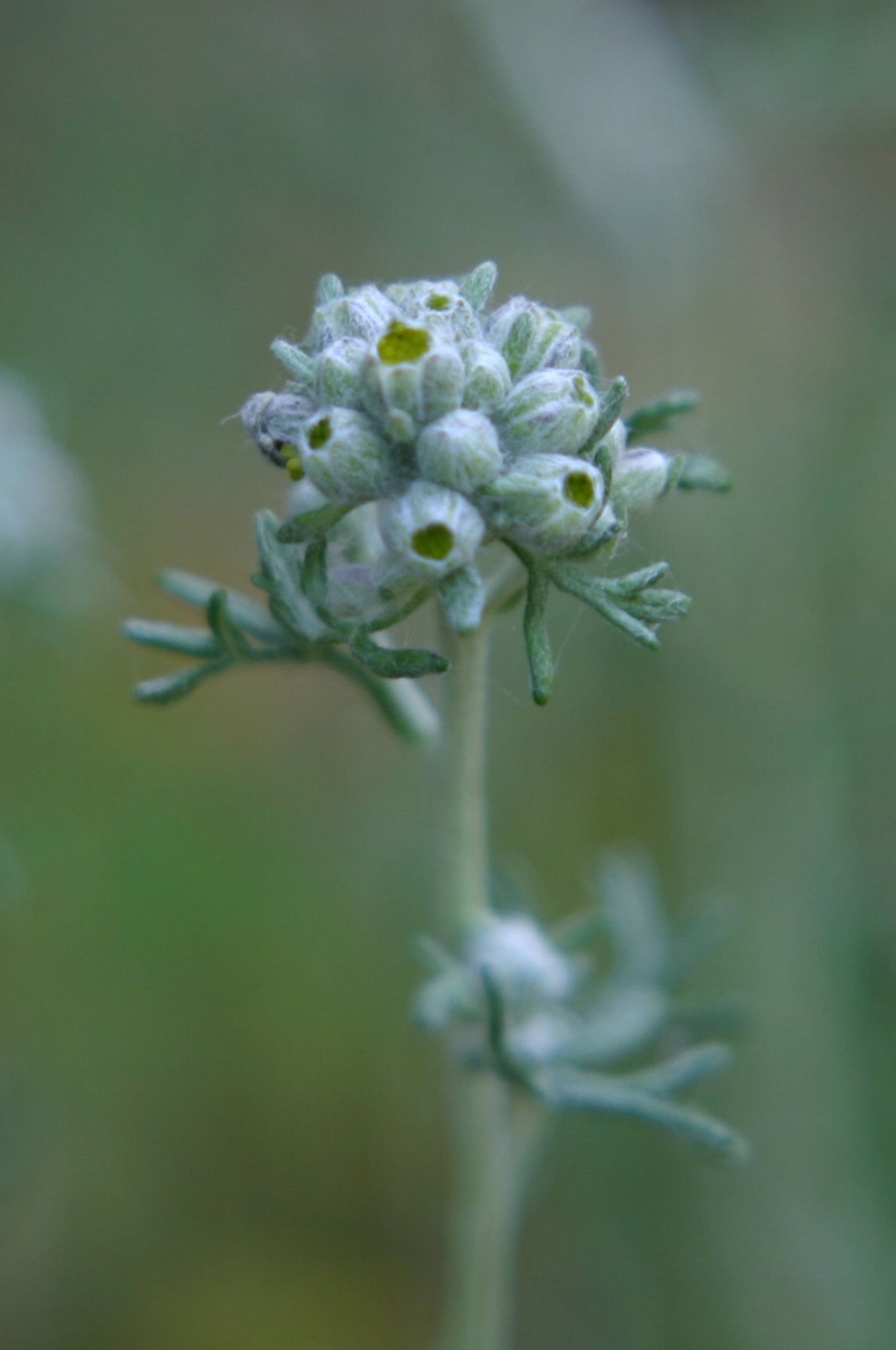
The buds are small, oval, and greenish-white.
