= Saltbush scrub =

Saltbush scrub is a Mojave Desert plant community and vegetation type, found above and beyond the alkali sink Shadscale scrub type.

Halophyte plants must deal with salt in the soil, but in less high concentrations than are found in the alkali sink shadscale scrub zone. Alkali sink vegetation grades into saltbrush scrub.

== Flora ==
Common species include members of the goosefoot family (Chenopodiaceae), such as:

- four-wing saltbrush (Atriplex canescens)
- shadscale (Atriplex confertifolia)
- cattle spinach, or all-scale (Atriplex polycarpa).

The shadscale scrub community vegetation also has these family Chenopodiaceae species, but is found at higher elevations.

== See also ==
- Shadscale scrub plant community
- Natural history of the Mojave Desert
- Flora of the California desert regions
