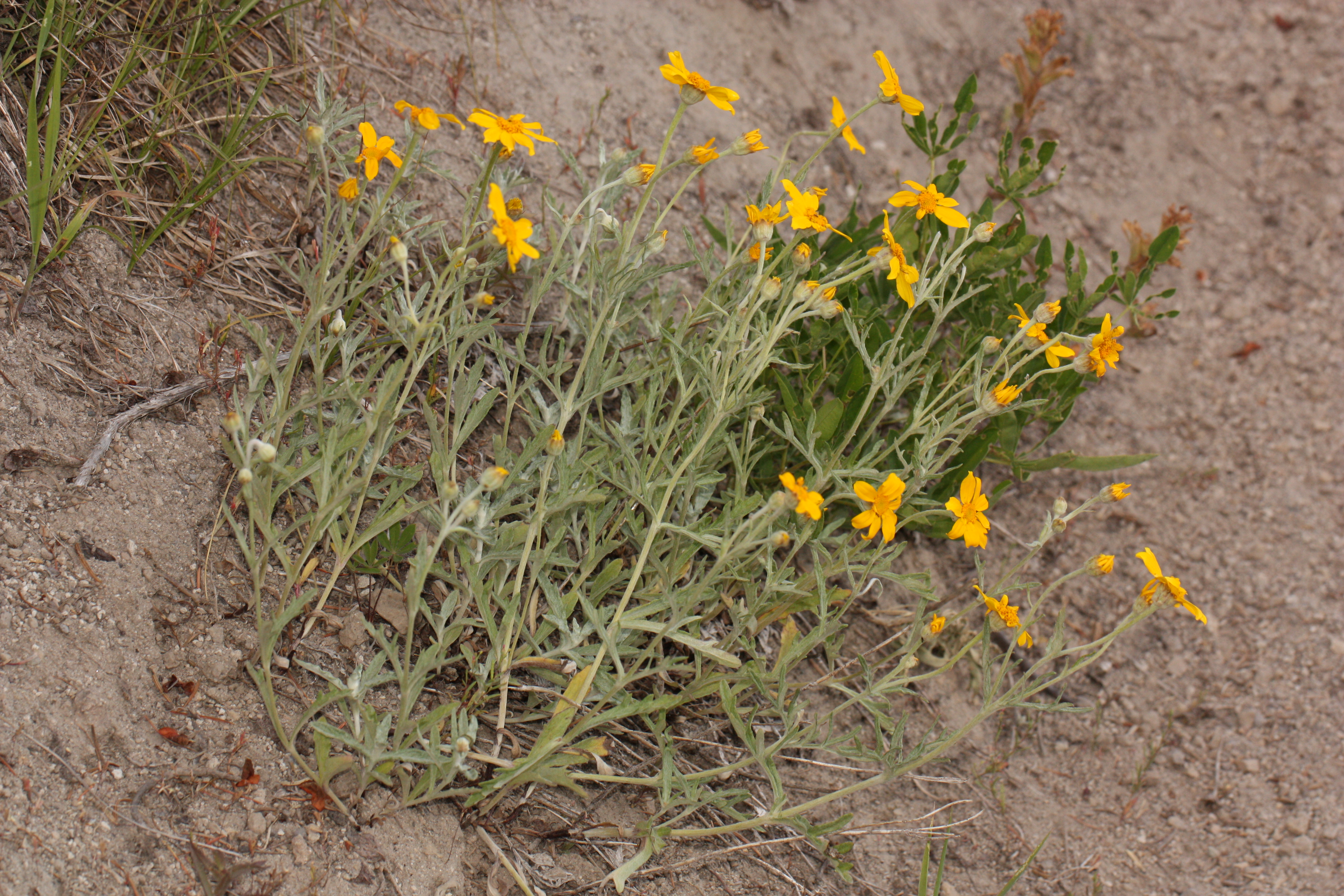

Scientific classification
- Kingdom: Plantae
- Clade: Embryophytes
- Clade: Tracheophytes
- Clade: Angiosperms
- Clade: Eudicots
- Clade: Asterids
- Order: Asterales
- Family: Asteraceae
- Genus: Eriophyllum
- Species: E. lanatum

Binomial name
- Eriophyllum lanatum (Pursh) Forbes

Synonyms
- Synonymy: Actinella lanata Pursh 1813; Actinea lanata (Pursh) Steud.; Bahia lanata (Pursh) DC.; Helenium lanatum (Pursh) Spreng.; Trichophyllum lanatum (Pursh) Nutt.; Eriophyllum caespitosum Douglas ex Lindl.; Eriophyllum harfordii Rydb.; Eriophyllum pedunculatum A.Heller; Eriophyllum superbum Rydb.; Bahia achillioides DC., syn of var. achillioides; Eriophyllum achilleoides (DC.) Greene, syn of var. achillioides; Eriophyllum greenei Elmer, syn of var. achillioides; Eriophyllum idoneum Jeps., syn of var. achillioides; Eriophyllum ternatum Greene, syn of var. achillioides; Bahia arachnoidea Fisch. & Avé-Lall., syn of var. arachnoideum; Bahia latifolia Lindl. 1853 not Benth. 1844, syn of var. arachnoideum; Bahia trolliifolia (Lag.) DC., syn of var. arachnoideum; Eriophyllum arachnoideum (Fisch. & Avé-Lall.) Greene, syn of var. arachnoideum; Eriophyllum trolliifolium Lag., syn of var. arachnoideum; Eriophyllum croceum Greene, syn of var. croceum; Egletes californica Kellogg, syn of var. grandiflorum; Eriophyllum grandiflorum (A.Gray) Greene, syn of var. grandiflorum; Eriophyllum speciosum Greene, syn of var. grandiflorum; Bahia cuneata Kellogg, syn of var. integrifolium; Bahia gracilis Hook. & Arn., syn of var. integrifolium; Bahia integrifolia (Hook.) DC., syn of var. integrifolium; Bahia leucophylla D.C.Eaton 1871 not DC. 1836, syn of var. integrifolium; Bahia multiflora (Nutt.) Nutt., syn of var. integrifolium; Eriophyllum bolanderi Rydb., syn of var. integrifolium; Eriophyllum chrysanthum Rydb., syn of var. integrifolium; Eriophyllum cineraria Rydb., syn of var. integrifolium; Eriophyllum cuneatum Rydb., syn of var. integrifolium; Eriophyllum gracile (Hook. & Arn.) A.Gray, syn of var. integrifolium; Eriophyllum integrifolium (Hook.) Greene, syn of var. integrifolium; Eriophyllum lutescens Rydb., syn of var. integrifolium; Eriophyllum monoense Rydb., syn of var. integrifolium; Eriophyllum multiflorum (Nutt.) Rydb., syn of var. integrifolium; Eriophyllum nevadense Gand., syn of var. integrifolium; Eriophyllum trichocarpum Rydb., syn of var. integrifolium; Eriophyllum watsonii A.Gray, syn of var. integrifolium; Trichophyllum integrifolium Hook., syn of var. integrifolium; Trichophyllum multiflorum Nutt., syn of var. integrifolium; Eriophyllum lanceolatum Howell, syn of var. lanceolatum; Eriophyllum rixfordii Eastw., syn of var. lanceolatum; Eriophyllum leucophyllum (DC.) Howell, syn of var. leucophyllum; Eriophyllum brachylepis Rydb., syn of var. obovatum; Eriophyllum obovatum Greene, syn of var. obovatum

= Eriophyllum lanatum =

Species of flowering plant

Eriophyllum lanatum, with the common names common woolly sunflower, Oregon sunshine and golden yarrow, is a common, widespread, North American plant in the family Asteraceae.

== Description ==
Eriophyllum lanatum is a perennial herb growing from 30 to 60 centimetres (12 to 24 inches) in height, in well-branched clumps. Both the stems and leaves may be covered with a woolly gray hair, but some plants lack this. The leaves are 2.5–7.5 cm (1–3 in) long, linear on the upper stems, and slender and pinnately lobed on the lower stems. The hairs conserve water by reflecting heat and reducing air movement across the leaf's surface.

The flowers are yellow and composite, looking much like true sunflowers, and sometimes grow to about 5 cm (2 in) wide. Both the (8–12) ray and disk flowers are yellow, with one flower head on each flowering stalk. The flower heads have 6–14 rays, which are darker towards the base, and several disk flowers. They bloom from May to August. The seeds have scales at the tip.

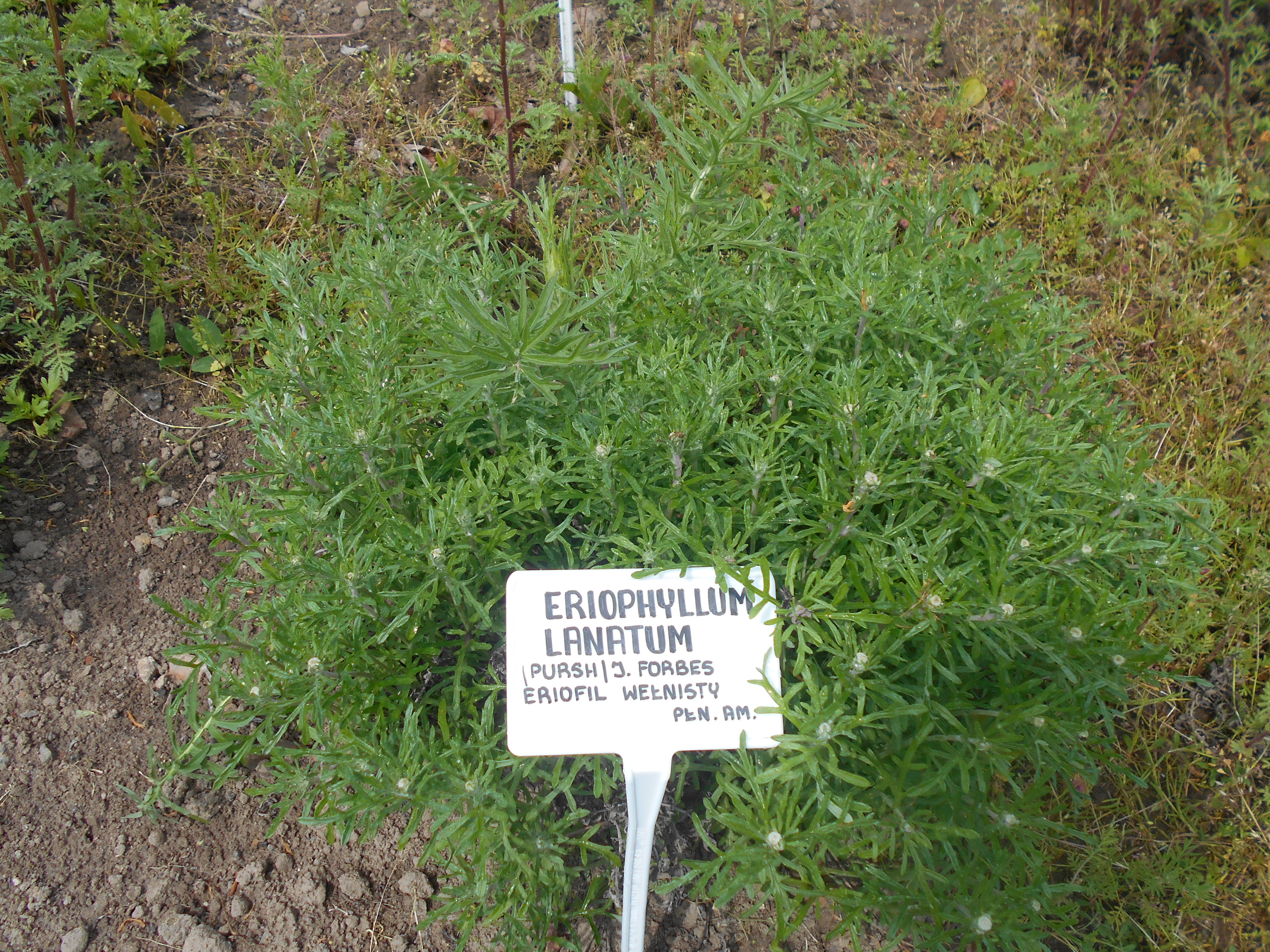
Shrub prior to bloom

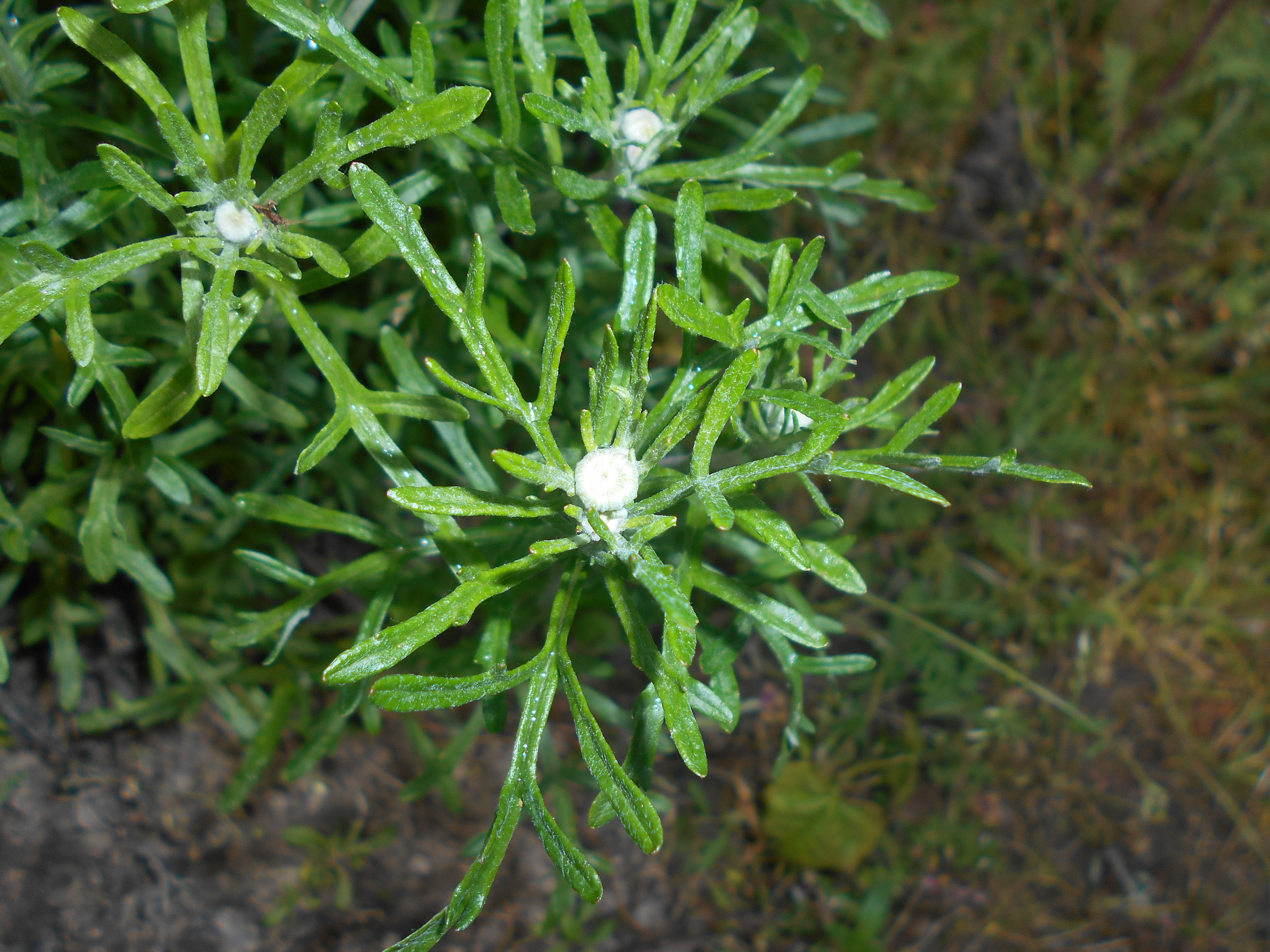
Leaves

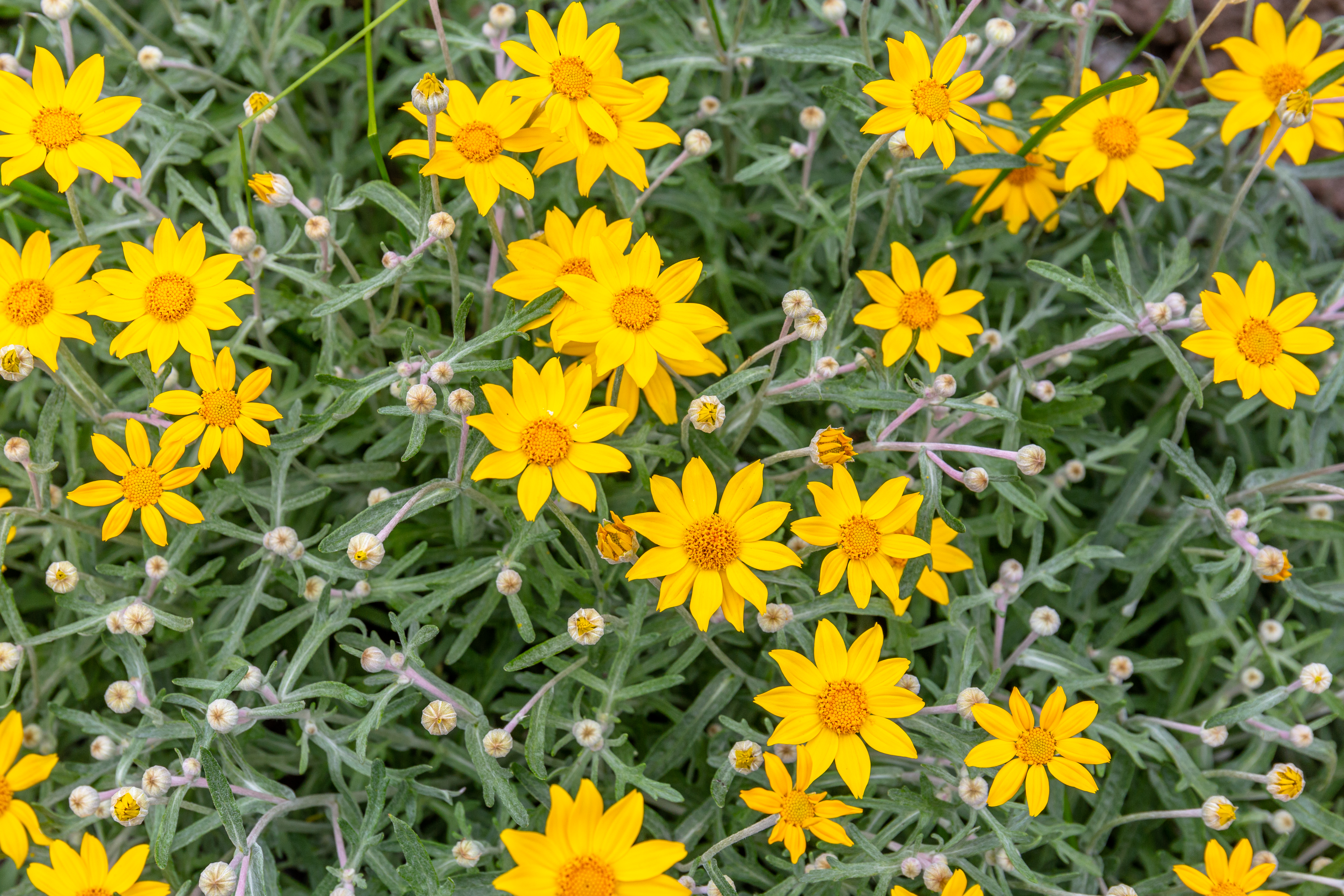
Flowers in bloom

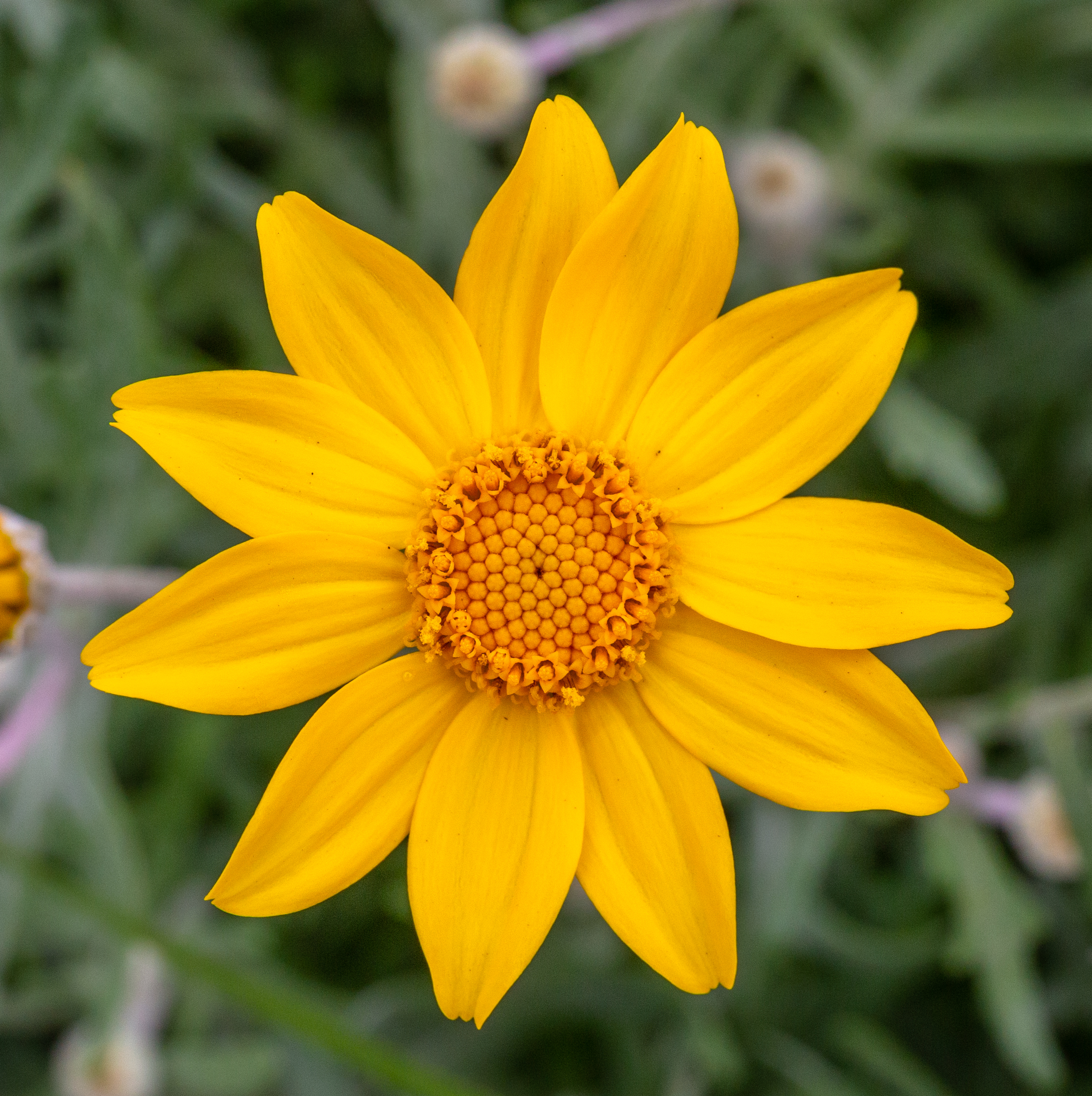
Flower close-up

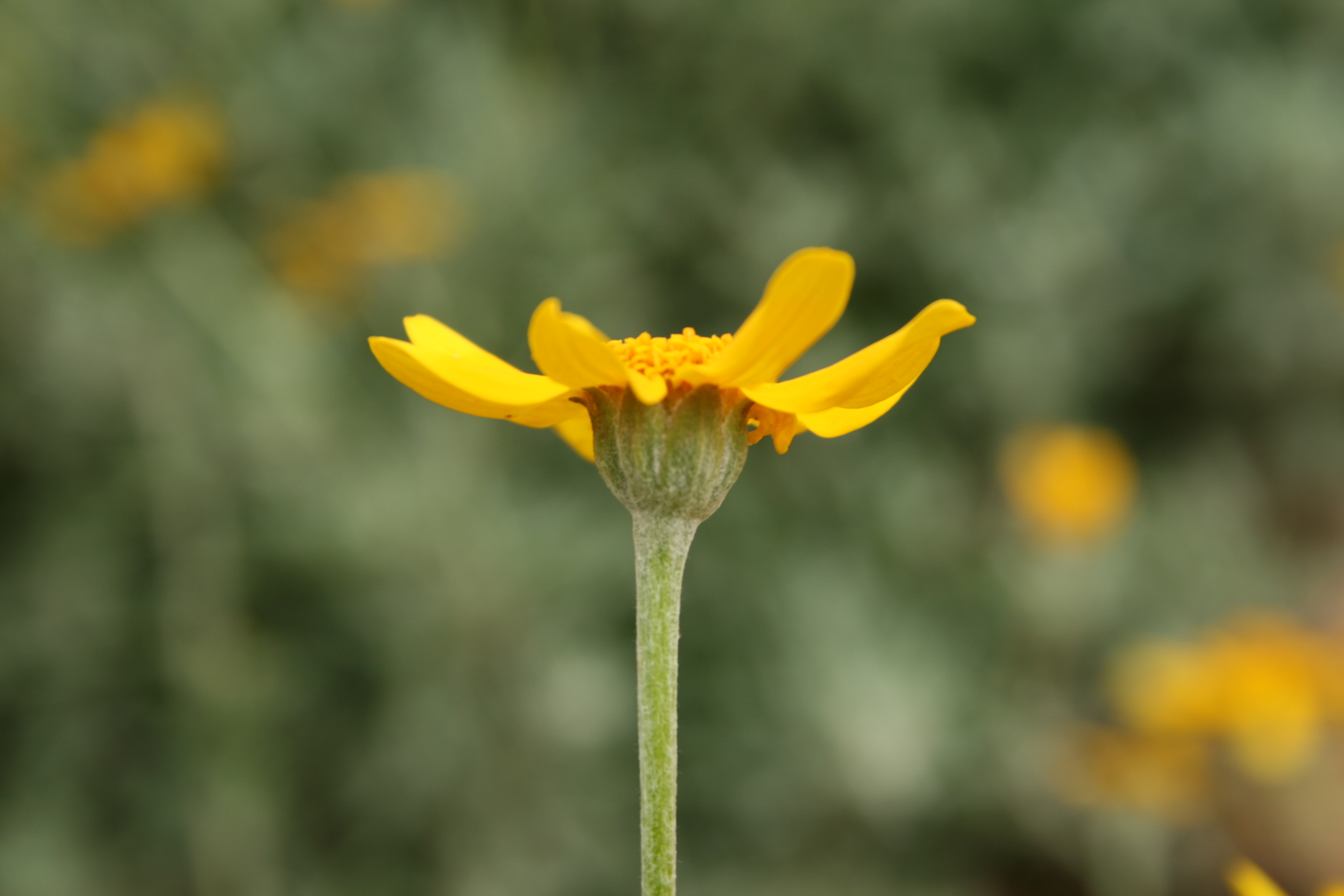
Side view of flower

== Taxonomy ==
The Lewis and Clark Expedition reportedly saw this plant growing above their camp on the Clearwater River (near present-day Kamiah, Idaho), and collected two specimens on 6 June 1806. Botanist Frederick Traugott Pursh studied the plants collected on the expedition; his first classification and naming of the species, as Actinella lanata, was published in 1813.

The common name "woolly sunflower" is often used to describe any member of the genus Eriophyllum.

=== Varieties ===
Varieties include:

- Eriophyllum lanatum var. achillioides (DC.) Jeps. — California, Nevada, Oregon.
- Eriophyllum lanatum var. arachnoideum (Fisch. & Avé-Lall.) Jeps. — Spiderweb sunflower; endemic to the California Coast Ranges from Del Norte County to Monterey County in California.
- Eriophyllum lanatum var. croceum (Greene) Jeps. — Sierra woolly sunflower; endemic to the Sierra Nevada in California.
- Eriophyllum lanatum var. grandiflorum (A.Gray) Jeps. — Large flowered woolly sunflower; northern California, Oregon.
- Eriophyllum lanatum var. hallii Constance — Fort Tejon woolly sunflower, Hall's woolly sunflower; endemic to the Tehachapi Mountains in Kern County, and Sierra Madre Mountains in Santa Barbara County, in southern California.
- Eriophyllum lanatum var. integrifolium (Hook.) Smiley — Oregon sunshine; California, Idaho, Montana, Nevada, Oregon, Utah, Washington, Wyoming.
- Eriophyllum lanatum var. lanatum — Idaho, Montana, Oregon, Washington.
- Eriophyllum lanatum var. lanceolatum (Howell) Jeps. — endemic to the Klamath Mountains, in NW California and SW Oregon.
- Eriophyllum lanatum var. leucophyllum (DC.) W.R.Carter — British Columbia, Oregon, Washington.
- Eriophyllum lanatum var. obovatum (Greene) H.M.Hall — Southern Sierra woolly sunflower; endemic to the western Sierra Nevada and the San Bernardino Mountains in California.

== Distribution and habitat ==
Eriophyllum lanatum is native to western North America. It is most common across California, also growing north through Oregon into British Columbia and east through Idaho into Wyoming, and through Nevada into Utah. This species has only been collected from Mexico once, on Guadalupe Island, and it is most likely extirpated there.

It can be found (for instance in California) in chaparral, oak woodland, mixed evergreen forest, and yellow pine forest and other conifer forests, grassland, and sagebrush scrub habitats. It commonly grows in dry, open places below 3,000 meters (10,000 feet) in elevation. It prefers full sun and well-drained soil, but it also grows on rocky slopes and bluffs.
