= Kramer Hills =

Hill range in California

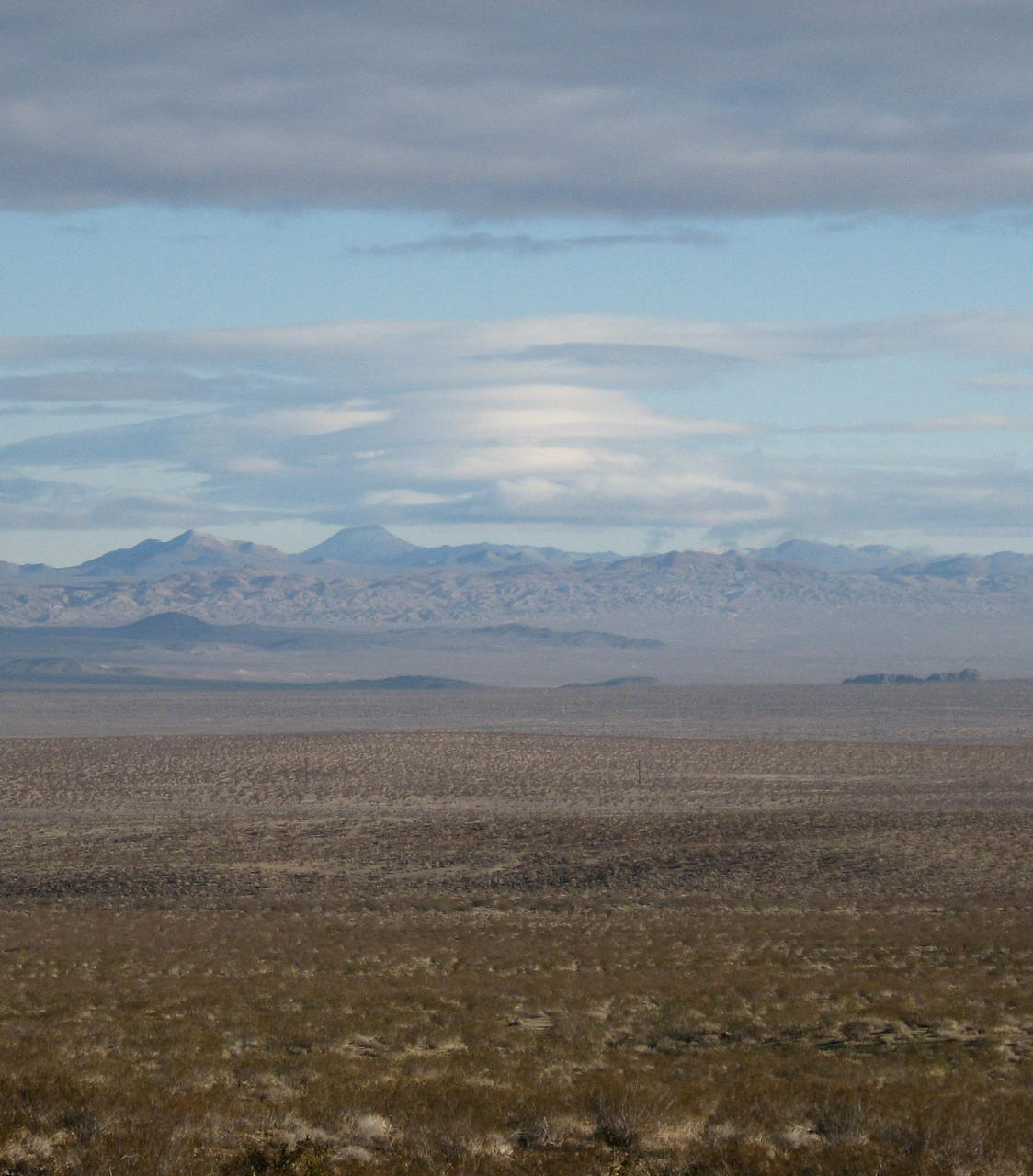
- Lenticular clouds above Kramer Hills

Highest point
- Elevation: 3,346 ft (1,020 m)

Geography
- Location within California Location within the United States
- Country: United States
- State: California
- Region: Mojave Desert
- District: San Bernardino County
- Range coordinates: 34°53′48.928″N 117°30′33.198″W
- Topo map: USGS Kramer Junction

The Kramer Hills are a small range of hills in the Mojave Desert, in northwestern San Bernardino County, southern California.

They are located just south of Kramer Junction and southeast of Boron.

The Kramer Hills are bisected by U.S. Route 395 passing through them. They are in a Bureau of Land Management administered area.
