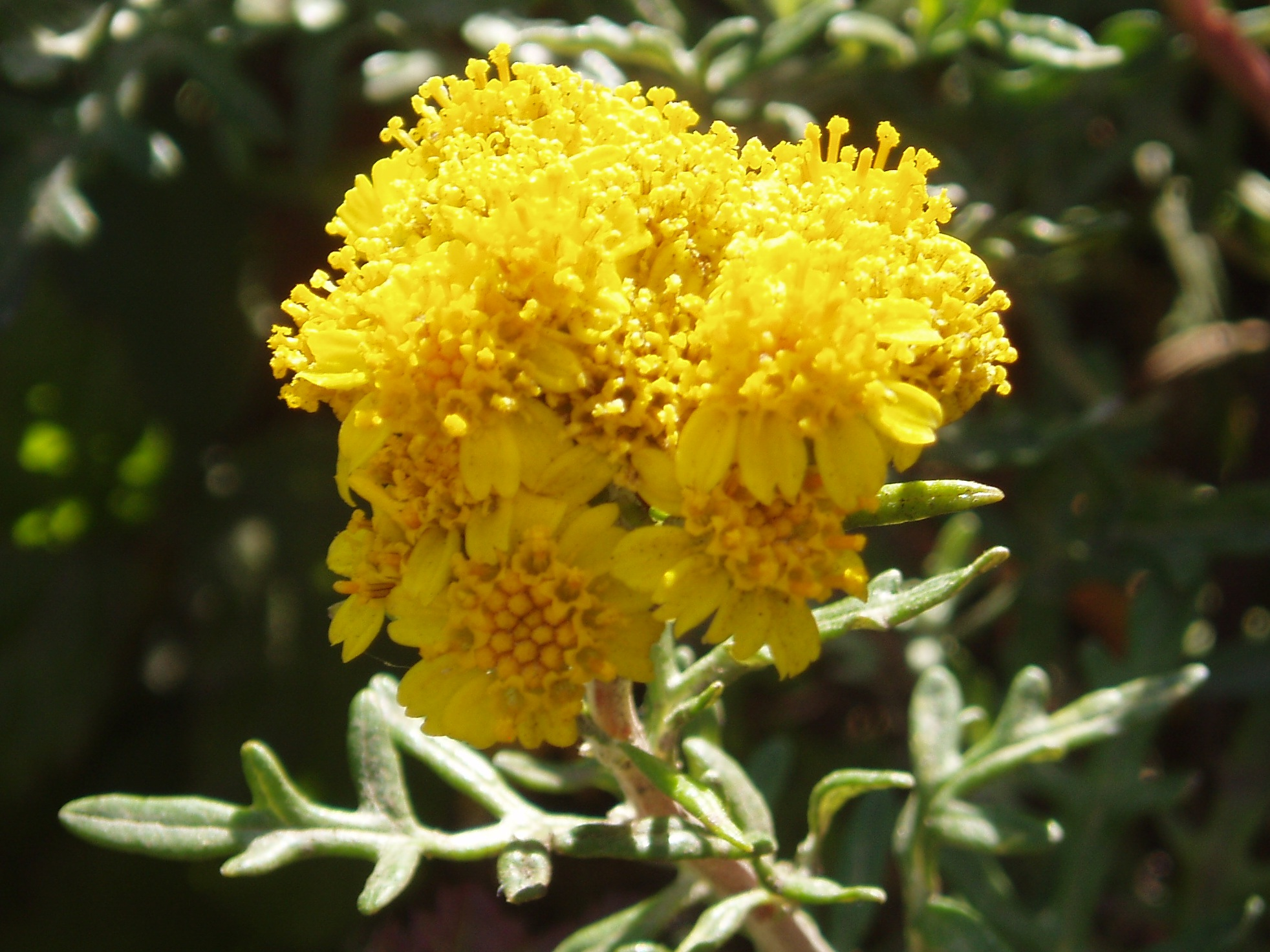

Scientific classification
- Kingdom: Plantae
- Clade: Tracheophytes
- Clade: Angiosperms
- Clade: Eudicots
- Clade: Asterids
- Order: Asterales
- Family: Asteraceae
- Genus: Eriophyllum
- Species: E. staechadifolium

Binomial name
- Eriophyllum staechadifolium Lag. 1816

Synonyms
- Eriophyllum stoechadifolium Lag., alternate spelling; Bahia artemisiifolia Less.; Bahia staechadifolia (Lag.) DC.; Eriophyllum artemisiifolium (Less.) Kuntze

= Eriophyllum staechadifolium =

Species of flowering plant

Eriophyllum staechadifolium is a flowering plant in the family Asteraceae which is known by the common names seaside woolly sunflower and lizard tail. It is native to the coastline of Oregon and California including the Channel Islands. This is a plant of the beaches, dunes, and coastal scrub.

Eriophyllum staechadifolium is variable in size, its height depending in part on its exposure to harsh coastal wind and saline spray. It may reach anywhere from 30 centimeters to 150 centimeters (1–5 feet) tall, and may be small and clumpy or quite sprawling. The leaves are up to seven centimeters (2.8 inches) long and are sometimes lobed. Each inflorescence holds several tightly packed flower heads in shades of golden yellow with centers full of 30-40 disc florets and usually a fringe of 6-6 small ray florets each a few millimeters long.

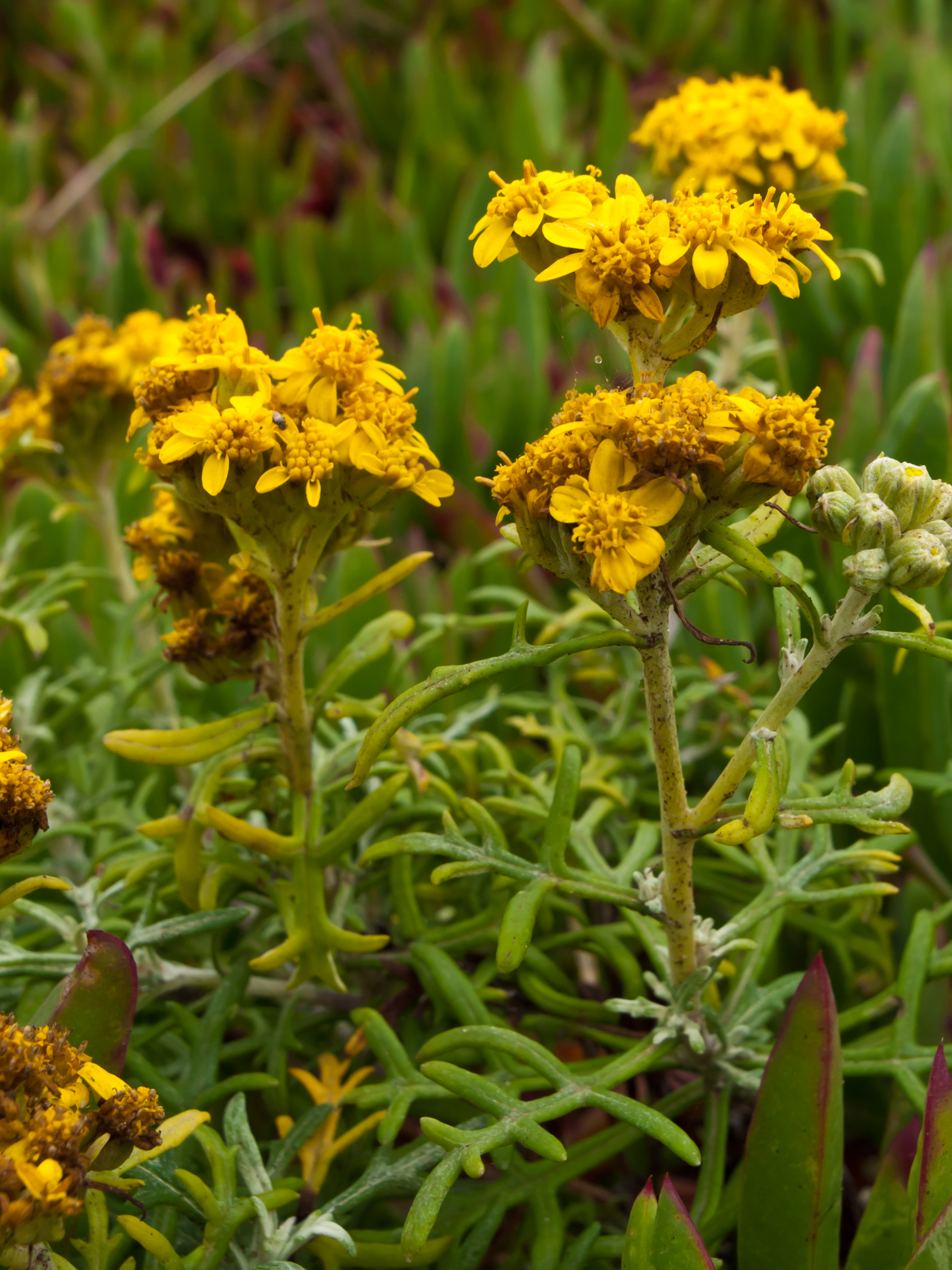
Lizard Tail (Eriophyllum staechadifolium), Marin County
