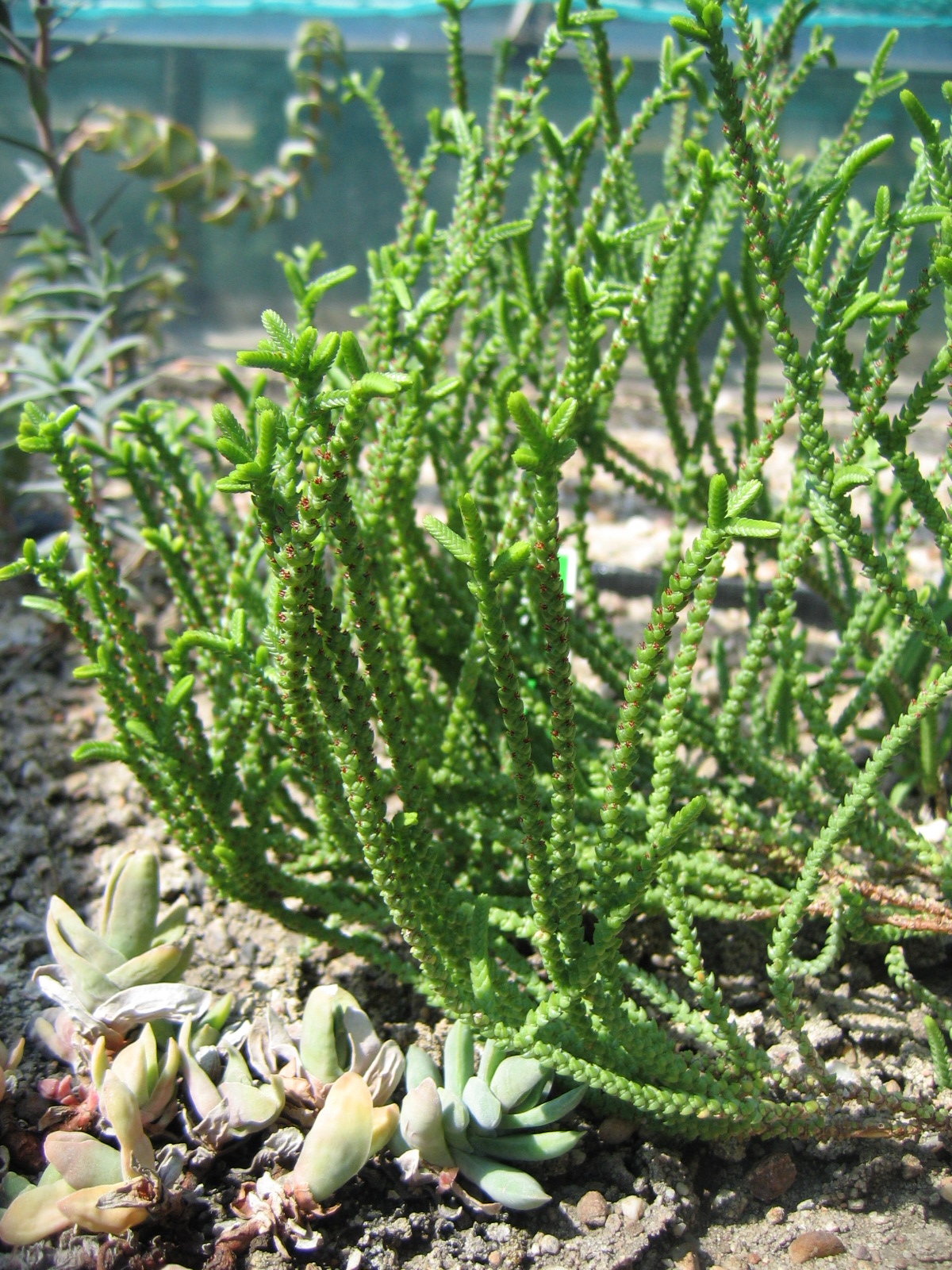
- Crassula muscosa var. accuminata

Scientific classification
- Kingdom: Plantae
- Clade: Tracheophytes
- Clade: Angiosperms
- Clade: Eudicots
- Order: Saxifragales
- Family: Crassulaceae
- Genus: Crassula
- Species: C. muscosa

Binomial name
- Crassula muscosa L.

Synonyms
- Crassula lycopodioides Crassula pseudolycopodioides

= Crassula muscosa =

Rattail crassula

Species of succulent

Crassula muscosa, synonyms Crassula lycopodioides and Crassula pseudolycopodioides, is a succulent plant native to South Africa and Namibia, belonging to the family Crassulaceae and to the genus Crassula. It is a houseplant grown worldwide and commonly known as rattail crassula, watch chain, lizard's tail, zipper plant and princess pines.

== Etymology ==
The scientific and the common names refer to its appearance: muscosa is Latin for "mossy". Lycopodioides refers to the clubmoss Lycopodium.

== Description ==
Crassula muscosa has very small, light green leaves that are densely packed around a thin stem, and the arrangement of the leaves around the stems gives them a square shape. It grows as an intricate bush with very small yellow-green flowers, with a maximum height of 15–20 cm (6–8 in).

== Distribution and habitat ==
Crassula muscosa is native to South Africa (the Cape Provinces, the Free State and the Northern Provinces) and Namibia. It grows in environments with a moderate degree of humidity, in which the soil is well drained and composed of fertile soil and sand.

== Cultivation ==
During the cold season, it tolerates temperature drops up to a minimum of 6-8°C, requiring little water. In summer, it needs a lot more water and should be not exposed to full sun, as it suffers under excessive sunlight. When these conditions are not met the plant begins to dry and stiffen, generally starting from the base of the stem up to the tips. It is an invasive species and easily propagated from stem cuttings. If the environment maintains a stable temperature of 20-21°C, with adequate humidity and brightness, the cutting will root and grow rapidly.

== Gallery ==
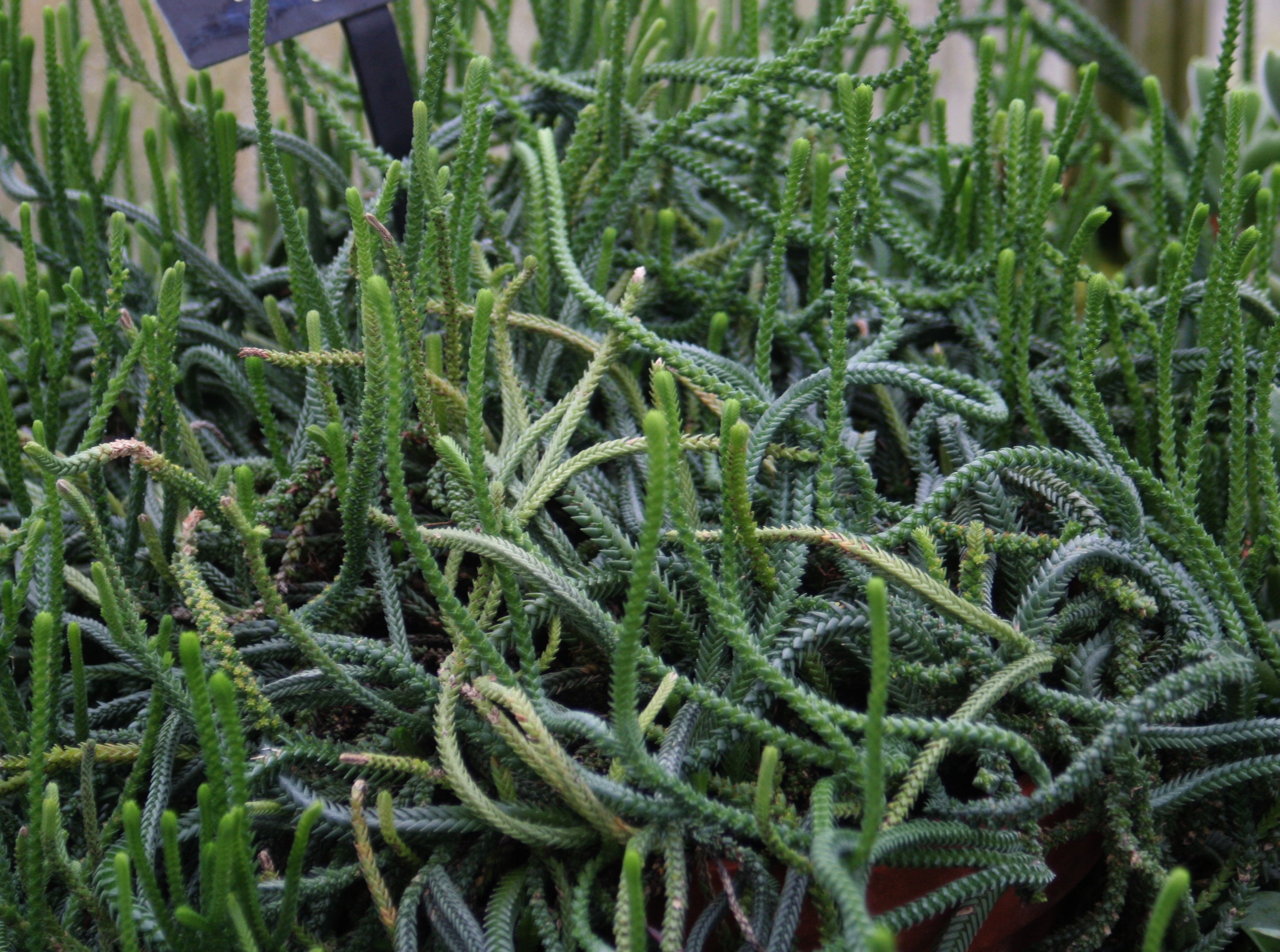
An exemplar at Buffalo and Erie County Botanical Gardens (Buffalo, NY)

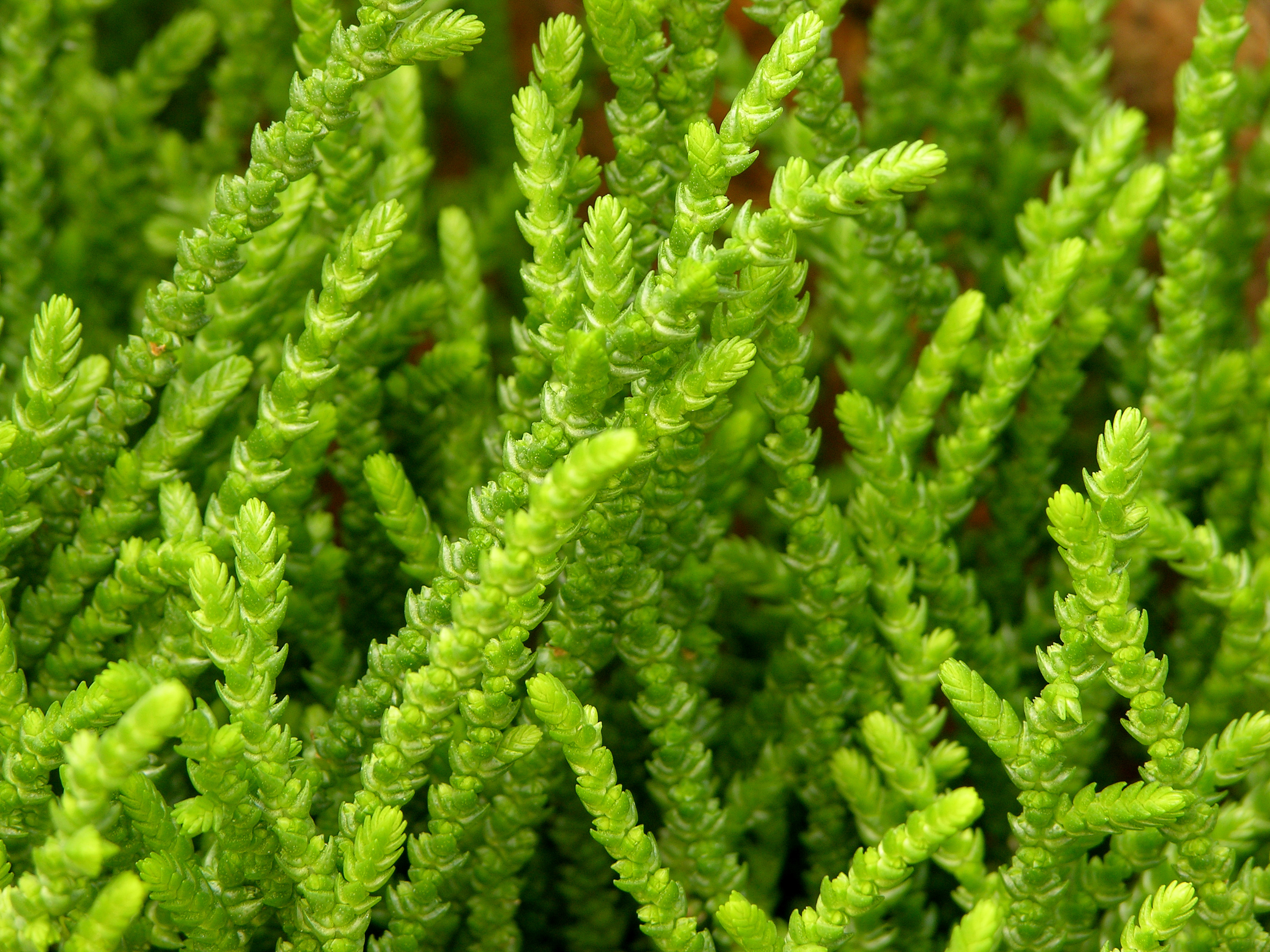
An exemplar at Chanticleer Garden (Wayne, PA)

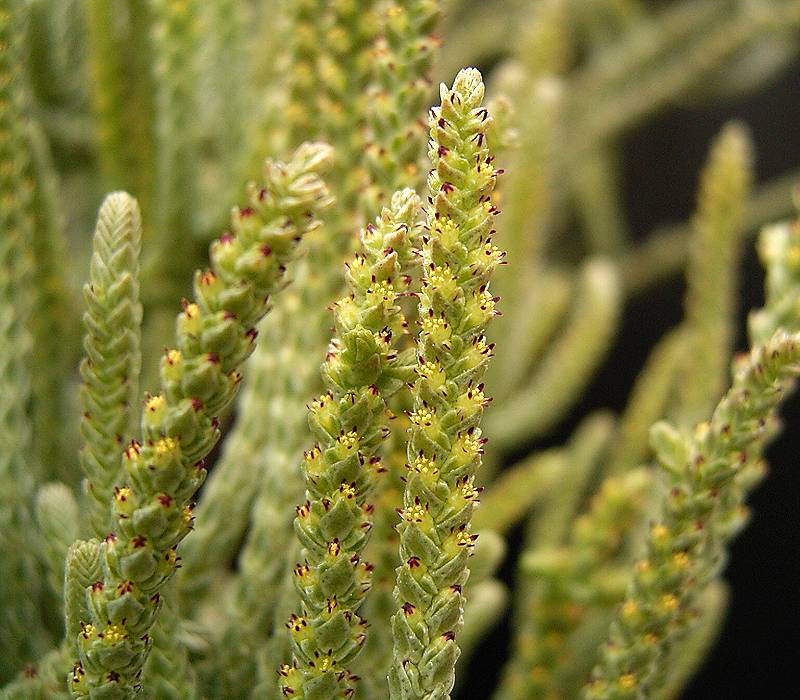
Stems, leaves and inflorescences

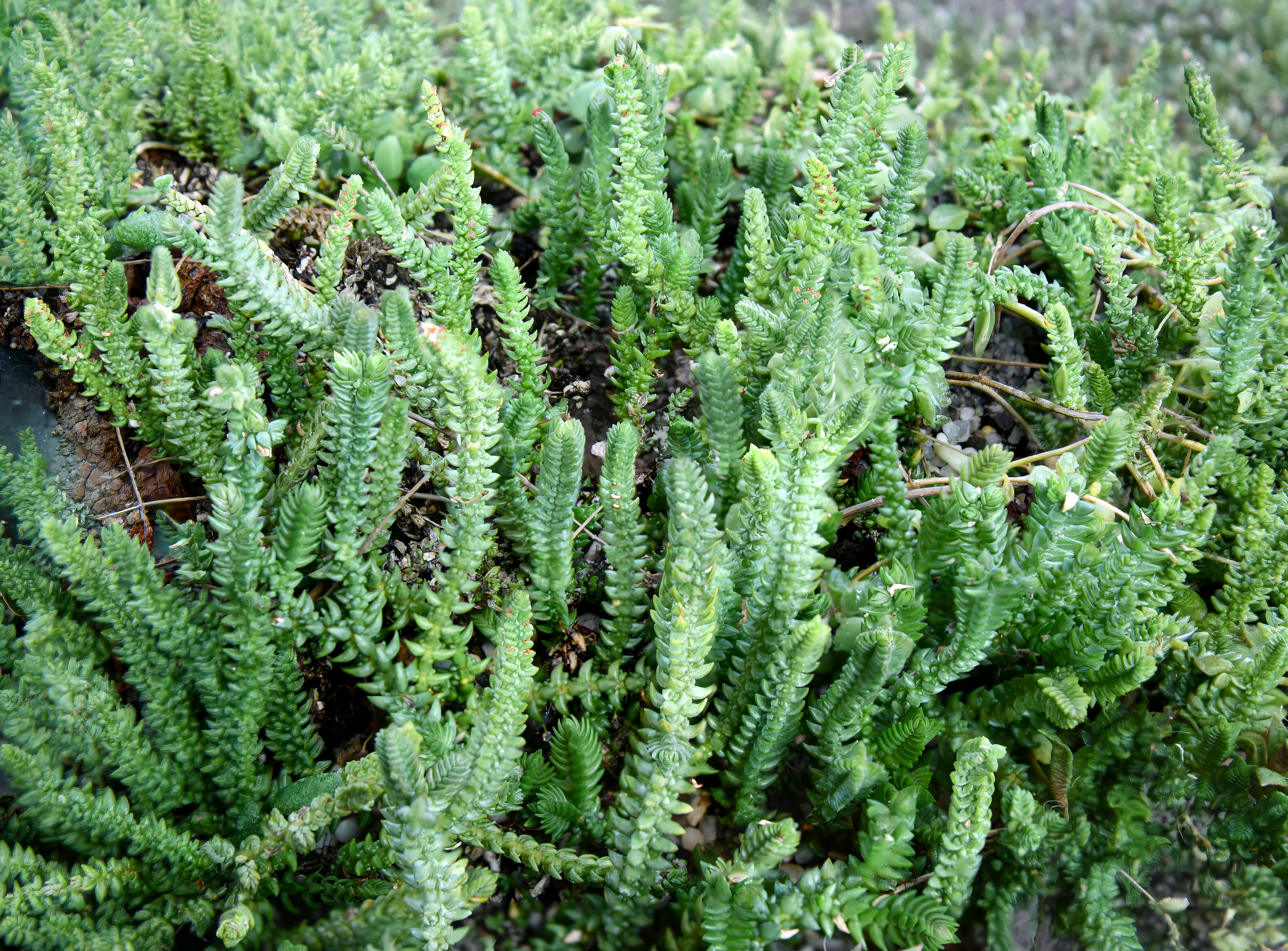
Detail of leaves

== Varieties ==
- Crassula muscosa var. accuminata
- Crassula muscosa var. muscosa
- Crassula lycopodioides var. purpusii
- Crassula muscosa var. rastafarii
- Crassula muscosa var. sinuata
- Crassula muscosa var. variegata
