= Geology of the Death Valley area =

Geology of the area in California and Nevada

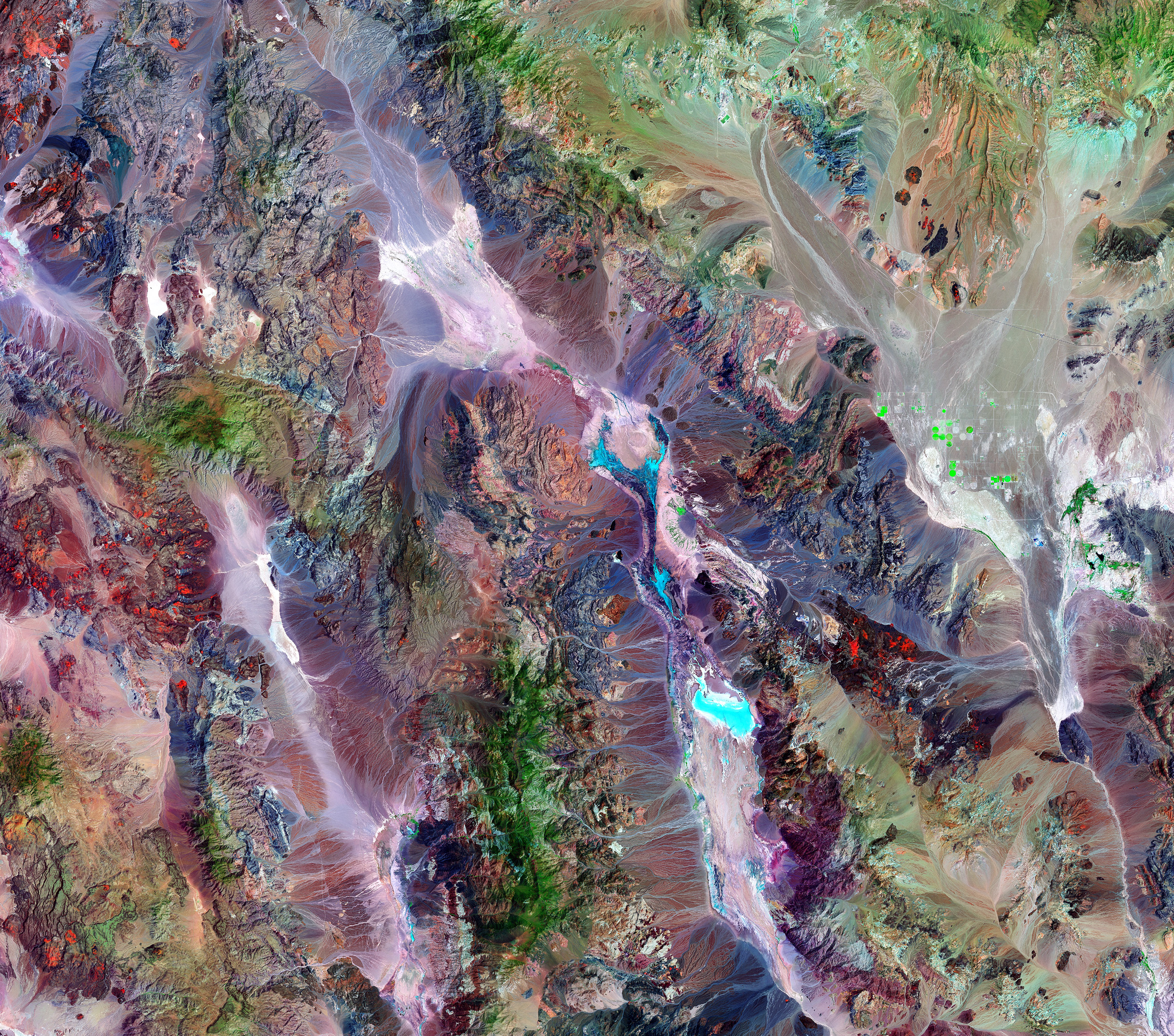
False color image of Death and Panamint valleys area from space. The smaller linear valley is Panamint Valley and the larger one is Death Valley. The mountain range between Death and Panamint valleys is the Panamint Range and the Black Mountains bound the other side of Death Valley. (NASA image)

The exposed geology of the Death Valley area presents a diverse and complex set of at least 23 formations of sedimentary units, two major gaps in the geologic record called unconformities, and at least one distinct set of related formations geologists call a group. The oldest rocks in the area that now includes Death Valley National Park are extensively metamorphosed by intense heat and pressure and are at least 1700 million years old. These rocks were intruded by a mass of granite 1400 Ma (million years ago) and later uplifted and exposed to nearly 500 million years of erosion.

Marine deposition occurred 1200 to 800 Ma, forming thick sequences of conglomerate, mudstone, and carbonate rock topped by stromatolites, and possibly glacial deposits from the hypothesized Snowball Earth event. Rifting thinned huge roughly linear parts of the supercontinent Rodinia enough to allow sea water to invade and divide its landmass into component continents separated by narrow straits. A passive margin developed on the edges of these new seas in the Death Valley region. Carbonate banks formed on this part of the two margins only to be subsided as the continental crust thinned until it broke, giving birth to a new ocean basin. An accretion wedge of clastic sediment then started to accumulate at the base of the submerged precipice, entombing the region's first known fossils of complex life. These sandy mudflats gave way about 550 Ma to a carbonate platform which lasted for the next 300 million years of Paleozoic time.

The passive margin switched to active margin in the early-to-mid Mesozoic when the Farallon Plate under the Pacific Ocean started to dive below the North American Plate, initiating a subduction zone; volcanoes and uplifting mountains were produced as a result. Erosion over many millions of years formed a relatively featureless plain. Stretching of the crust under western North America started around 16 Ma and is thought to be caused by upwelling from the subducted spreading-zone of the Farallon Plate. This process continues into the present and is thought to be responsible for producing the Basin and Range province. By 2 to 3 million years ago this province had spread to the Death Valley area, ripping it apart and giving birth to Death Valley, Panamint Valley and surrounding ranges. These valleys partially filled with sediment and, during colder periods during the current ice age, with lakes. Lake Manly was the largest of these lakes; it filled Death Valley during each glacial period from 240,000 years ago to 10,000 years ago. By 10,500 years ago these lakes were increasingly cut off from glacial melt from the Sierra Nevada, starving them of water and concentrating salts and minerals. The desert environment seen today developed after these lakes dried up.

== Early sedimentation ==
=== Proterozoic complex ===
Little is known about the history of the oldest exposed rocks in the area due to extensive metamorphism. This somber, gray, almost featureless crystalline complex is composed of originally sedimentary and igneous rocks with large quantities of quartz and feldspar mixed in. The original rocks were transformed to contorted schist and gneiss, making their original parentage almost unrecognizable. Radiometric dating gives an age of 1700 million years for the metamorphism, placing it in the early part of the Proterozoic eon.

A mass of granite now in the Panamint Mountains intruded this complex 1400 mya. Pegmatic dikes and other widely spaced plutons of granite are also in the complex (a pluton is a large blob of magma deep underground and dikes are projections of that). Outcrops can be seen along the front of the Black Mountains in Death Valley and in the Talc and Ibex Hills. When the granite was being intruded, the west coast of North America ran through Eastern California and through an embayment that spread toward the Las Vegas Valley. This embayment, called the Amargosa aulacogen, had highlands north and south of it and was the result of a failed rift. Many thousands of feet of sediment filled the slowly subsiding basin.

Next, the metamorphosed Precambrian basement rocks were uplifted and a nearly 500-million-year-long gap in the geologic record, a major unconformity, affected the region. Geologists do not know what happened to the eroded sediment that must have overlain the complex, but they do know that regional uplift was responsible; the area was originally below the surface of a shallow sea.

=== Pahrump Group ===
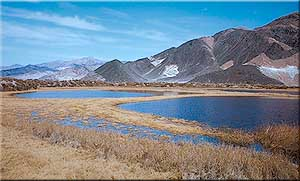
View north across Saratoga Spring ponds to hills consisting of late Precambrian Pahrump Group rocks. White band is talc formed by reaction of dolomite with the black diabase enclosing it. A sill of diabase magma intruded between sedimentary layers of Crystal Spring Formation, now seen flanking the diabase at lower left. All units now tilt to east (right). The spring water rises along a fault and becomes ponded by fringing barrier dunes. (NPS archive image)

The Pahrump Group of formations were deposited from 1200 to 800 mya in the Amargosa aulacogen. This was after uplift-associated erosion removed whatever rocks covered the Proterozoic Complex. Pahrump is composed of, from oldest to youngest:

- Crystal Spring Formation,
- Beck Spring Dolomite,
- Kingston Peak Formation.

Outcrops of this group can be seen in a highly metamorphosed belt that extends from the Panamint Mountains to the eastern part of the Kingston Range, including an area near the Ashford Mill site.

Uplift eventually exposed the crystalline complex to erosion. Arkose conglomerate and mudstone of the lower Crystal Spring Formation were formed from muddy debris derived from stream erosion of these uplands. A warm shallow sea spread over the area as the Amargosa aulacogen slowly subsided; thick sequences of lime-rich ooze with abundant colonies of algae called stromatolites were then laid down. Dolomite and limestone resulted, forming the middle part of the Crystal Spring Formation. The upper part was formed after silt and sand destroyed the algal mat, forming siltstone and sandstone. Laterally extensive diabase sills of molten rock later intruded above and below the carbonate rock layers; commercial grade talc was formed from thermal decay of carbonate rock at its contact with the lowest sill, which covers hundreds of square miles (many hundreds of km^{2}). Today the formation is 3,000 feet (910 m) thick.

The Death Valley region once again rose above sea level, resulting in erosion. The Amargosa aulacogen then slowly sank beneath the seas; a sequence of carbonate banks that were topped by algal mats of stromatolites were laid on top of its eroded surface. Eventually these sediments and fossils became the Beck Spring Formation, which is 1,000 feet (300 m) thick.

Another round of uplift exposed the Beck Spring rocks and the underlying Crystal Spring to erosion; subsequent faster subsidence of the Amargosa aulacogen broke these formations into islands in later Proterozoic time. The resulting large sequence of thick conglomerate beds of pebbles and boulders in a sandy and muddy matrix that blanketed basins between higher areas is known as the Kingston Peak Formation. This formation is prominent near Wildrose, Harrisburg Flats, and Butte Valley and is 7,000 feet (2,100 m) thick.

Part of the Kingston Peak resembles glacial till by being poorly sorted and other parts have large boulder-sized dropstones resting in a fine-grained matrix of sandstone and siltstone. Similar deposits are found over North America during the same period, some 700 to 800 mya. Geologists therefore hypothesize that the world at that time was affected by a very severe glaciation, perhaps the most severe in geologic history (see Snowball Earth). The youngest rocks in the Pahrump Group are from basaltic lava flows.

== Crustal thinning and rifting ==
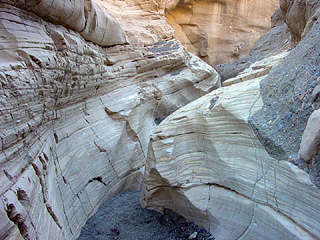
Late Precambrian Noonday Formation scoured in Mosaic Canyon by episodic flow. (USGS photo)

A new rift opened that started to break apart the supercontinent Rodinia, of which North America was then a part. A shoreline similar to the present Atlantic Ocean margin of the United States, with coastal lowlands and a wide, shallow shelf but no volcanoes, lay to the east near where Las Vegas now resides.

The first formation to be deposited in this setting was the Noonday Dolomite, which was formed from an algal mat-covered carbonate bank. Today it is up to 1,000 feet (300 m) thick and is a pale yellowish-gray cliff-former. The area subsided as the continental crust thinned and the new ocean widened; the carbonate bank soon became covered by thin beds of silt and layers of lime-rich ooze. These sediments in time hardened to become the siltstone and limestone of the Ibex Formation. A good outcrop of both the Noonday and overlying Ibex formations can be seen just east of the Ashford Mill Site.

An angular unconformity truncates progressively older (lower) parts of the underlying Pahrump Group starting in the southern part of the area and moving north. At its northernmost extent, the unconformity in fact removed all of the Pahrump, and the Noonday rests directly on the Proterozoic Complex. An ancient period of erosion removed that part of the Pahrump due to its being higher (and thus more exposed) than the rest of the formation.

== Passive margin formed ==
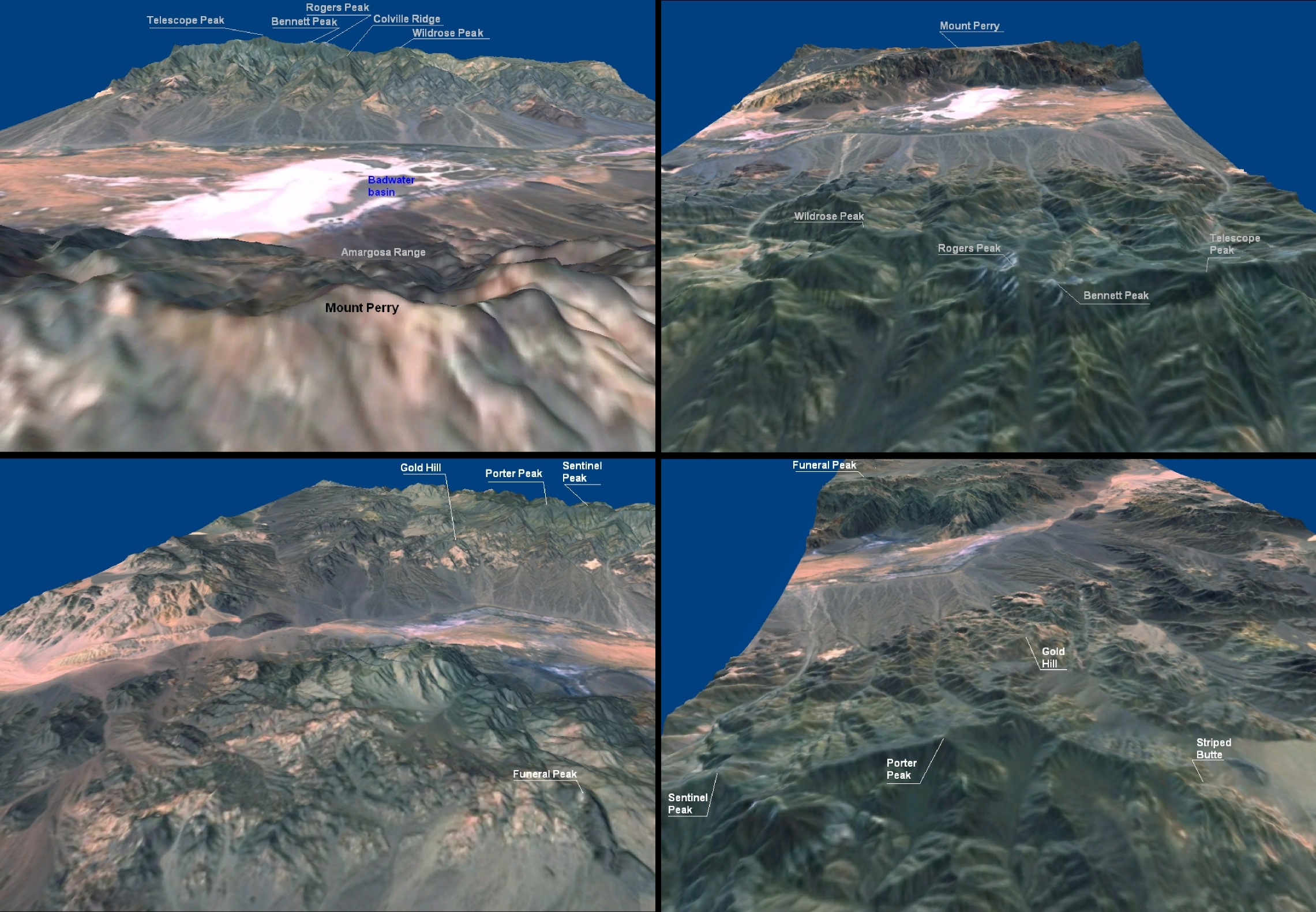
Death Valley 3D views

As the incipient ocean widened in the Late Proterozoic and Early Paleozoic, it broke the continental crust in two and a true ocean basin developed to the west. All the earlier formations were thus dissected along a steep front on the two halves of the previous continent. A wedge of clastic sediment then started to accumulate at the base of the two underwater precipices, starting the formation of opposing continental shelves.

Three formations developed from sediment that accumulated on the wedge. They are, from oldest to youngest:

- Johnnie Formation (varicolored shaly),
- Stirling Quartzite,
- Wood Canyon Formation, and the
- Zabriskie Quartzite.

Together the Stirling, Wood Canyon, and Zabriskie units are about 6,000 feet (1,800 m) thick and are made of well-cemented sandstones and conglomerates. They also contain the region's first known fossils of complex life: Ediacara fauna, trilobites, archaeocyathas, and primitive echinoderm burrows have been found in the Wood Canyon Formation. The very earliest animals are exceedingly rare, occurring well west of Death Valley in lime-rich offshore muds contemporary to the Stirling Quartzite. Good outcrops of these formations are exposed on the north face of Tucki Mountain in the northern Panamint Mountains.

The side road to Aguereberry Point successively traverses the shaly Johnnie Formation, the white Stirling Quartzite, and dark quartzites of the Wood Canyon Formation; at the Point itself is the great light-colored band of Zabriskie Quartzite dipping away toward Death Valley. Prominent outcrops are located between Death Valley Buttes and Daylight Pass, in upper Echo Canyon, and just west of Mare Spring in Titus Canyon. Before tilting to their present orientation, these four formations were a continuous pile of mud and sand 3 miles (4.8 km) deep that accumulated slowly on the nearshore ocean bottom.

== A carbonate shelf forms ==
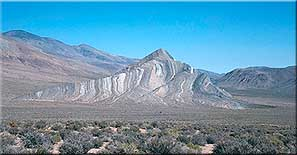
Striped Butte in Butte Valley. Steeply tilted limestone beds of the Permian Anvil Spring Formation. A major fault behind the butte separates it from Precambrian Noonday and Johnnie Formation rocks, about 1/2 billion years older. (USGS photo)

A carbonate shelf started to develop over the sandy mudflats early in Paleozoic time. Sediment accumulated on the new but slowly subsiding continental shelf all through the Paleozoic and into the Early Mesozoic. Erosion had so subdued nearby parts of the continent that rivers ran clear, no longer supplying abundant sand and silt to the continental shelf. At the time, the Death Valley area was within ten or twenty degrees of the Paleozoic equator. So the combination of a warm sunlit climate and clear mud-free waters promoted prolific production of biotic (from life) carbonates. Thick beds of carbonate-rich sediments were periodically interrupted by periods of emergence, forming the (in order of deposition);

- Carrara Formation,
- Bonanza King Formation,
- Nopah Formation, and the
- Pogonip Group.

These sediments were lithified into limestone and dolomite after they were buried and compacted by yet more sediment. Thickest of these units is the dolomitic Bonanza King Formation, which forms the dark and light banded lower slopes of Pyramid Peak and the gorges of Titus and Grotto Canyons.

An intervening period occurred in the Late Ordovician (about 450 Ma) when a sheet of quartz-rich sand blanketed a large part of the continent after the above-mentioned units were laid down. The sand later hardened into sandstone and later still metamorphosed into the 400-foot (100 m) thick Eureka Quartzite. This great white band of Ordovician rock stands out on the summit of Pyramid Peak, near the Racetrack, and high on the east shoulder of Tucki Mountain. No American source is known for the Eureka sand, which once blanketed a 150,000 square miles (390,000 km^{2}) belt from California to Alberta. It may have been swept southward by longshore currents from an eroding sandstone terrain in Canada.

Deposition of carbonate sediments resumed and continued into the Triassic. Four formations were deposited during this time (from oldest to youngest);

- Ely Springs Dolomite,
- Hidden Valley Dolomite,
- Lost Burro Formation, and the
- Tin Mountain Limestone.

The other period of interruption occurred between 350 and 250 Ma when sporadic pulses of mud swept southward into the Death Valley region during the erosion of highlands in north-central Nevada.

Although details of geography varied during this immense interval of time, a north-northeasterly trending coastline generally ran from Arizona up through Utah. A marine carbonate platform only tens of feet deep but more than 100 miles (160 km) wide stretched westward to a fringing rim of offshore reefs. Lime-rich mud and sand eroded by storm waves from the reefs and the platform collected on the quieter ocean floor at depths of 100 feet (30 m) or so. The Death Valley area's carbonates appear to represent all three environments (down-slope basin, reef, and back-reef platform) owing to movement through time of the reef-line itself.

All told, these eight formations and one group are 20,000 feet (6,100 m) thick and are buried below much of the Cottonwood, Funeral, Grapevine, and Panamint ranges. Good outcrops can be seen in the southern Funeral Mountains outside the park and in Butte Valley within park borders. The Eureka Quartzite appears as a relatively thin, nearly white band with the grayish Pogonip Group below and the almost black Ely Springs Dolomite above. All strata are often vertically displaced by normal faulting.

== Change to active margin and uplift ==
The western edge of the North American continent was later pushed against the oceanic plate under the adjacent ocean. An area of great compression called a subduction zone was formed in the early-to-mid Mesozoic, which replaced the quiet, sea-covered continental margin with erupting volcanoes and uplifting mountains. A chain of volcanoes pushed through the continental crust parallel to the deep trench, fed by magma rising from the subducting oceanic plate as it entered the Earth's hot interior. Thousands of feet (hundreds of meters) of lavas erupted, pushing the ocean over 200 miles (320 km) to the west.

Compressive forces built up along the entire length of the broad continental shelf. The Sierran Arc, also called the Cordilleran Mesozoic magmatic arc, started to form from heat and pressure generated from the subduction. Compressive forces caused thrust faults to develop and granitic blobs of magma called plutons to rise in the Death Valley region and beyond, most notably producing the Sierra Nevada Batholith to the west. Thrust faulting was so severe that the continental shelf was shortened and some parts of older formations were moved on top of younger rock units.

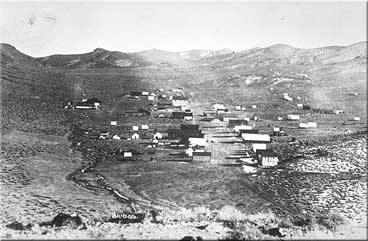
Skidoo townsite in 1906

The plutons in the park are Jurassic and Cretaceous aged and are located toward the park's western margin where they can be seen from unimproved roads. One of these relatively small granitic plutons was emplaced 67–87 Ma and spawned one of the more profitable precious metal deposits in the Death Valley area, giving rise to the town and mines of Skidoo. In the Death Valley area these solidified blobs of magma are located under much of the Owlshead Mountains and are found in the western end of the Panamint Mountains. Thrusted areas can be seen at Schwaub Peak in the southern part of the Funeral Mountains.

A long period of uplift and erosion was concurrent with and followed the above events, producing a major unconformity. Sediments worn off the Death Valley region were shed both east and west and carried by wind and water; the eastern sediments ended up in Colorado and are now famous for their dinosaur fossils. No Jurassic to Eocene sedimentary formations exist in the area except for some possibly Jurassic-age volcanic rock around Butte Valley. Large parts of previously deposited formations were removed; probably by streams that washed the sediment into the Cretaceous Seaway that longitudinally divided North America to the east.

== Development of a plain ==
After 150 million years of volcanism, plutonism, metamorphism, and thrust faulting had run their course, the early part of the Cenozoic era (early Tertiary, 65–30 Ma) was a time of repose; neither igneous nor sedimentary rocks of this age are known here. A relatively featureless plain was formed from erosion over many millions of years. Deposition resumed some 35 Ma in the Oligocene epoch on a flood plain that developed in the area; sluggish streams migrated laterally over the surface, laying down cobbles, sand, and mud. Outcrops of the resulting conglomerates, sandstone, and mudstone of the Titus Canyon Formation can be observed in road cuts at Daylight Pass on Daylight Pass Road, which becomes State Route 374 a short distance from the pass. Several other similar formations were also laid down.

Large volcanic eruptions, originating near the Nevada Test Site, covered the Death Valley area and much of Nevada in thick sequences of silica-rich ash 27 million years ago. The ash has a rhyolitic composition, which is the volcanic equivalent of the plutonic rock granite; it covered what would later become the Grapevine Mountains in 1,200 feet (370 m) of ash. This ash filled in valleys and depressions; by 20 million years ago, the region from the Death Valley area across Nevada was a volcanic plain.

== Extension produces the Basin and Range ==
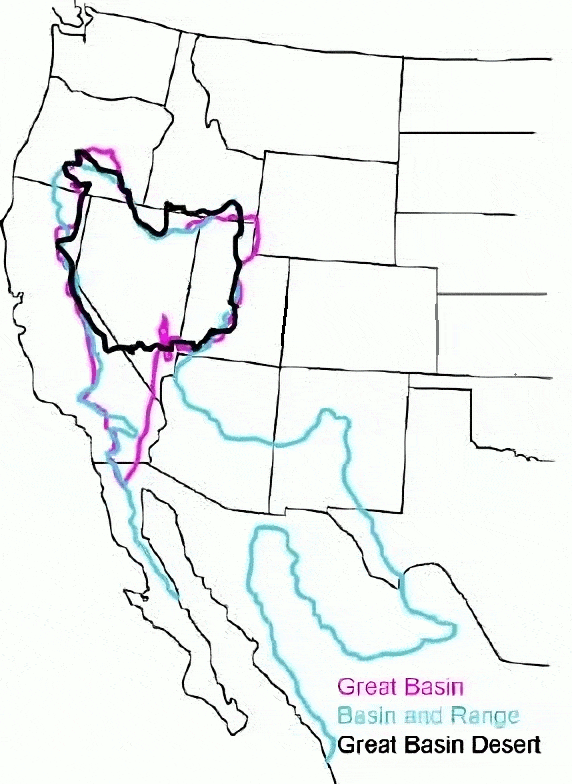
Full extent of the Basin and Range. (NPS image)

Starting around 16 Ma in Miocene time and continuing into the present, a large part of the North American Plate in the region has been under extension by literally being pulled apart. Debate still surrounds the cause of this crustal stretching, but an increasingly popular idea among geologists called the slab gap hypothesis states that the spreading zone of the subducted Farallon Plate is pushing the continent apart. Whatever the cause, the result has been the formation of a large and still-growing region of relatively thin crust; the region grew an average of 1 inch (2.5 cm) per year initially and then slowed to 0.3 inches (0.76 cm) per year in the last 5 million years. Geologists call this region the Basin and Range Province.

Extensional forces causes rock at depth to stretch like silly putty and rock closer to the surface to break along normal faults into downfallen basins called grabens; small mountain ranges known as horsts run parallel to each other on either side of the graben. Normally the number of horsts and grabens is limited, but in the Basin and Range region there are dozens of horst/graben structures, each roughly north–south trending. A succession of these extend from immediately east of the Sierra Nevada, through almost all of Nevada, and into western Utah and southern Idaho. The crust in the Death Valley region between Lake Mead and the southern Sierra Nevada has been extended by as much as 150 miles (240 km).

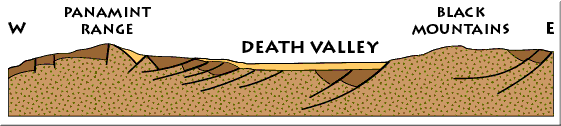
The deep Death Valley basin is filled with sediment (light yellow) eroded from the surrounding mountains. Black lines show some of the major faults that formed the valley. (USGS image)

The Furnace Creek Fault system, located in what is now the northern part of Death Valley, started to move about 14 Ma and the Southern Death Valley Fault system likely began to move by 12 million years ago. Both fault systems move with a right-lateral, or dextral, offset along strike-slip faults. With such faults, the opposite side of the fault appears to be moving right when facing the fault from either side. Both fault systems run parallel to and at the base of the ranges. Very often the same faults move laterally and vertically, simultaneously making them strike-slip and normal (i.e. oblique-slip). These two systems are also offset from each other; the area between the offset is thus put under enormous oblique tension, which intensifies subsidence there; Furnace Creek Basin opened in this area and the rest of Death Valley followed in stages. One of the last stages was the formation of Badwater Basin, which occurred by about 4 Ma. Data from gravimeters show that Death Valley's bedrock floor tilts down toward the east and is deepest under Badwater Basin; there is 9,000 feet (2,700 m) of fill under Badwater. By about 2 Ma Death Valley, Panamint Valley and their associated ranges were formed.

Much of the extra local stretching in Death Valley that is responsible for its lower depth and wider valley floor is caused by left lateral strike-slip movement along the Garlock Fault south of the park (the Garlock Fault separates the Sierra Nevada range from the Mojave Desert). This particular fault is pulling the Panamint Range westward, causing the Death Valley graben to slip downward along the Furnace Creek Fault system at the foot of the Black Mountains. The rocks that would become the Panamint Range may have been stacked on top of the rocks that would become the Black Mountains and the Cottonwood Mountains. Under this interpretation, as the Black Mountains began to rise, the Panamint/Cottonwood Mountains slid westward off of them along low-angle normal faults, and starting around 6 Ma, the Cottonwood Mountains slid northwest off the top of the Panamint Range. There is also some evidence that the Grapevine Mountains may have slid off the Funeral Mountains. Another interpretation of the evidence is that the Black and Panamint Mountains were once side by side and were pulled apart along normal faults. These normal faults, in this view, are steep near the surface but become low angle at depth; the mountain blocks rotated as they slid to produce the tilted mountains seen today.

Total movement of the Pamamint block between the Garlock and Furnace Creek Faults is 50 miles (80 km) to the northwest, giving birth to Death Valley in the process. A few of the 20 to 25 degree-sloped surfaces along which this mass of 20,000 to 30,000 feet (6,100 to 9,100 m) of rock slipped, are exposed in Death Valley. These features are called "turtlebacks" due to their turtle shell-like appearance.

== Volcanism and valley-fill sedimentation ==
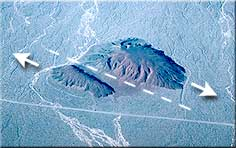
Split Cinder Cone was produced by magma that followed a fault plane. That same fault has since moved laterally, tearing the small volcano in half. (Tom Bean, NPS image)

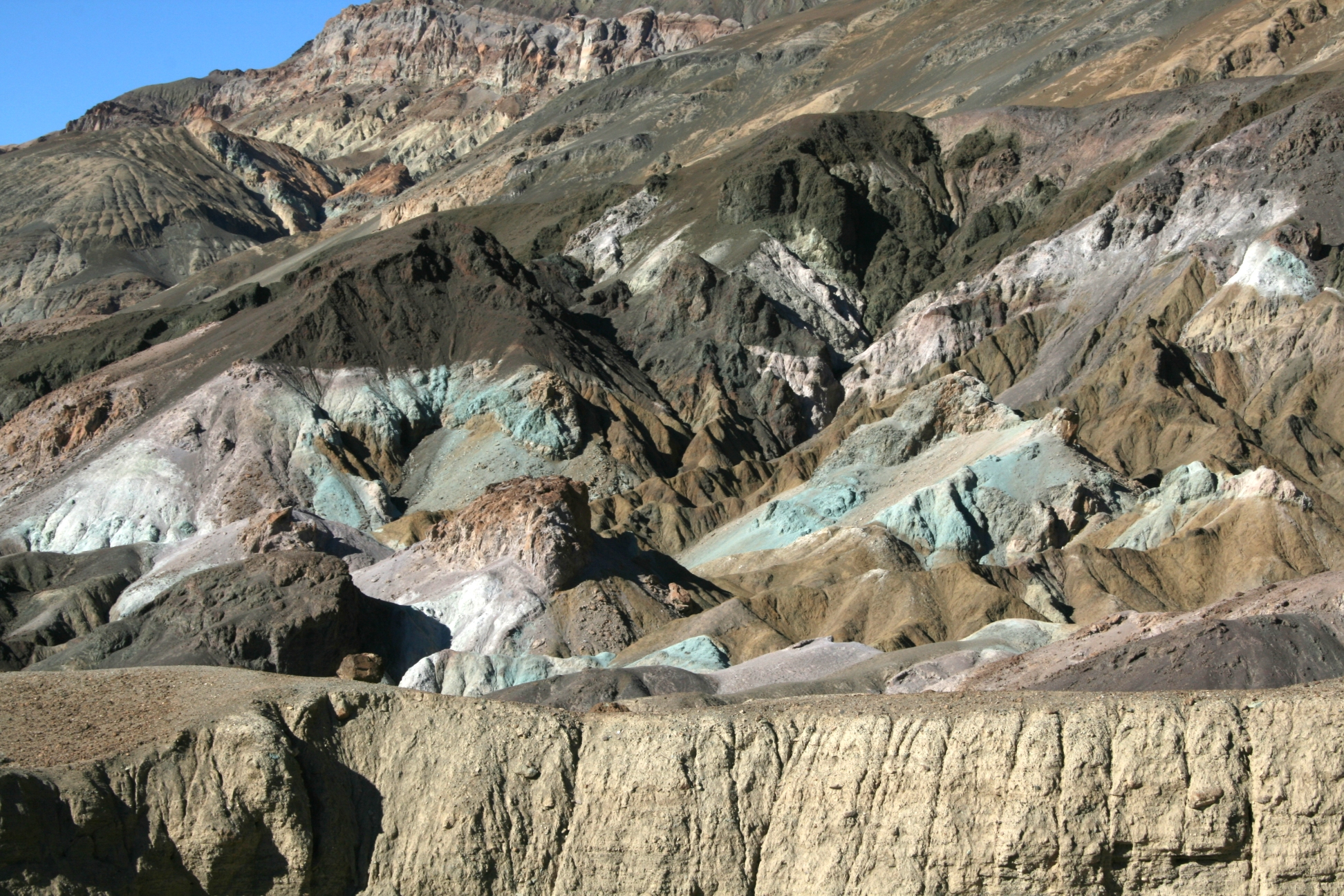
Artist's Palette got its colors from volcanic deposits.

Igneous activity associated with the extension occurred from 12 to 4 Ma. Both intrusive (plutonic/solidified underground) and extrusive (volcanic/solidified above ground) igneous rocks were produced. Basaltic magma followed fault lines to the surface and erupted as cinder cones and lava flows. Some volcanic rocks were re-worked by hydrothermal systems to form colorful rocks and concentrated mineral formations, such as boron-rich minerals like borax; a Pliocene-aged example is the 4,000-foot (1,200 m)-thick Artist Drive Formation. Gold and silver ores were also concentrated by mineralizing fluids from igneous intrusions. Other times, heat from magma migrating close to the surface would superheat overlaying groundwater until it exploded, not unlike an exploding pressure-cooker, forming blowout craters and tuff rings. One example of such a feature is the roughly 2000-year-old and 800 feet (240 m) deep Ubehebe Crater (photo) in the northern part of the park; nearby smaller craters may be less than 200 to 300 years old.

Sediment filled the subsiding Furnace Creek Basin as the area was pulled apart by Basin and Range extension. The resulting 7,000-foot (2,100 m)-thick Furnace Creek Formation is made of lakebed sediments that consist of saline muds, gravels from nearby mountains and ash from the then-active Black Mountain volcanic field. Boron, which is abundant in this formation, is dissolved by ground water and flows out onto the northern end of the Death Valley playa. Today this formation is most-prominently exposed in the badlands at Zabriskie Point. Additional subsidence of the Furnace Creek Basin was filled by the four-million-year-old Funeral Formation, which consists of 2,000 feet (610 m) of conglomerates, sand, mud and volcanic material. Another smaller basin to the south was filled by the Copper Canyon Formation around the same time. Footprints and fossils of camels, horses, and mammoths are in all three of these Pliocene formations.

About 2–3 Ma, in the Pleistocene, continental ice sheets expanded from the polar regions of the globe to cover lower latitudes far north of the region, starting a series of cold glacial periods that were interrupted by warmer interglacial periods. Snowmelt from alpine glaciers on the nearby Sierra Nevada during glacial periods fed rivers that flowed into the valleys of the region year round. Since the topography of the Basin and Range region was largely formed by faulting, not by river erosion, many of the basins have no outlets, meaning they will fill up with water like a bathtub until they overflow into the next basin. So during the cooler and wetter pluvial climates of the glacial periods, much of eastern California, all of Nevada, and western Utah were covered by large lakes separated by linear islands (the present day ranges).

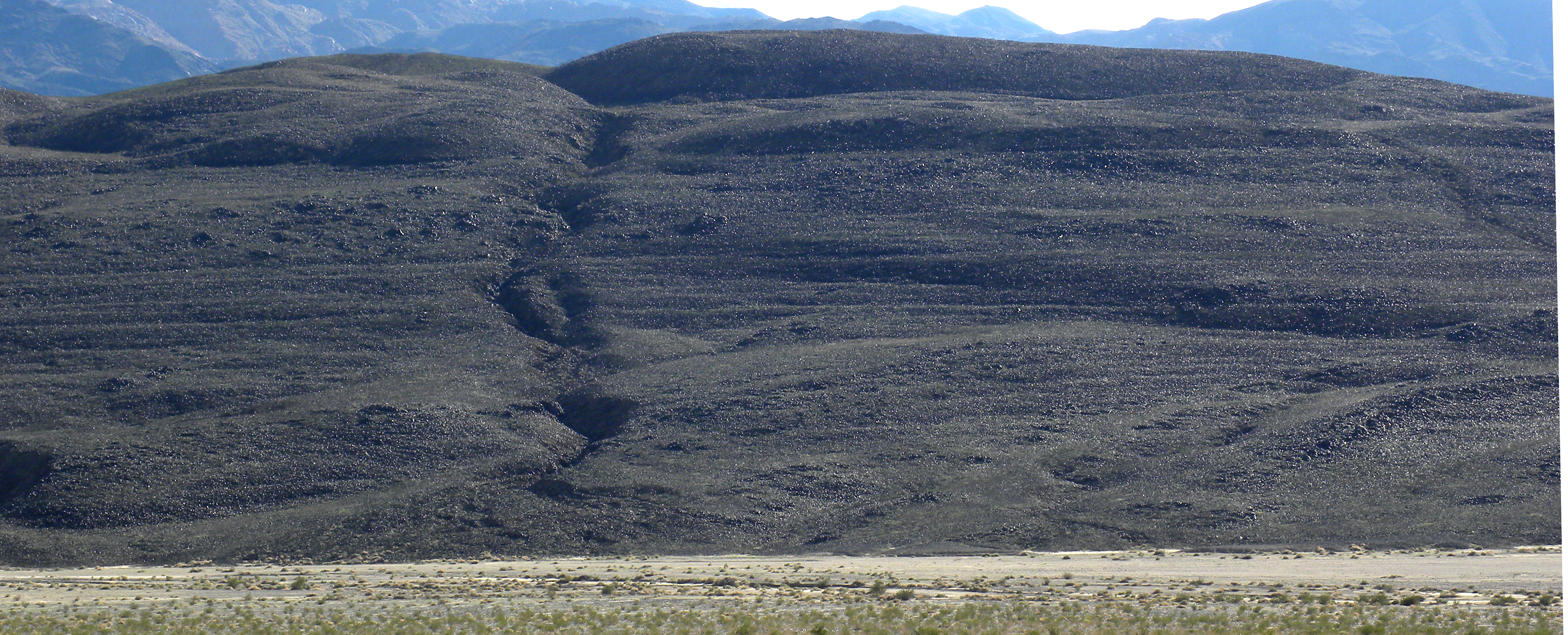
Shoreline Butte showing Lake Manly shorelines

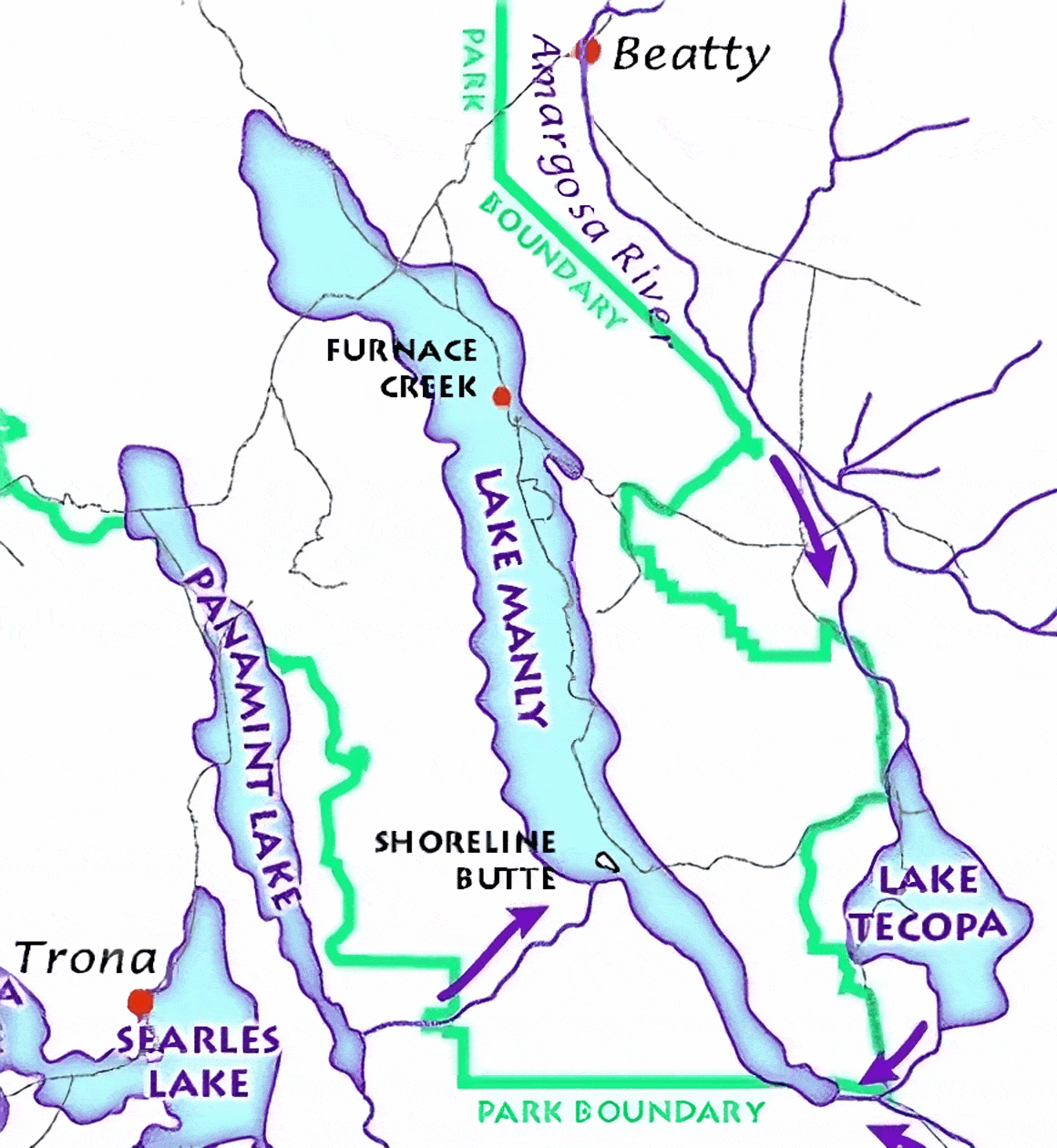
The Lake Manly lake system as it might have looked during its last maximum extent 22,000 years ago. Arrows indicate river water flow, gray lines are current highways, and red dots are towns. (USGS image)

Lake Manly was the lake that filled Death Valley during each glacial period from at least 240,000 years ago to as late as 10,500 years ago; the lake typically dried up during each interglacial period, such as the current one. Lake Manly was the last in a chain of lakes that were fed by the Amargosa and Mojave Rivers, and possibly also the Owens River; it was also the lowest point in the Great Basin drainage system. At its height during the Last glacial period some 22,000 years ago, water filled Lake Manly to form a body of water that may have been 585 feet (178 m) deep and 90 miles (140 km) long. Much smaller lakes filled parts of Death Valley during interglacials; the largest of these was 30 feet (9.1 m) deep and lasted from 5000 to 2000 years ago. Panamint Lake filled Panamint Valley to a maximum depth of 900 feet (270 m); when it was full, Panamint Lake overflowed into Lake Manly somewhere around the southern end of the Panamint Mountains.

Lake Manly and its sister lakes started to dry up about 10,000 years ago as the alpine glaciers that fed the rivers that filled the lakes disappeared and the region became increasingly arid. Fish that had migrated into the lake system from the Colorado River started to die off; the only survivors are the minnow-sized Death Valley pupfish and related species that adapted to living in springs. Ancient weak shorelines called strandlines from Lake Manly can easily be seen on a former island in the lake called Shoreline Butte.

Stream gradients increased on flanking mountain ranges as they were uplifted. These swifter moving streams are dry most of the year but have nevertheless cut true river valleys, canyons, and gorges that face Death and Panamint valleys. In this arid environment, alluvial fans form at the mouth of these streams. Very large alluvial fans merged to form continuous alluvial slopes called bajadas along the Panamint Range. The faster uplift along the Black Mountains formed much smaller alluvial fans because older fans are buried under playa sediments before they can grow too large. Slot canyons are often found at the mouths of the streams that feed the fans, and the slot canyons in turn are topped by V-shaped gorges. This forms what looks like a wineglass shape to some people, thus giving them their names, "wineglass canyons".

== Formation of the Walker Lane ==
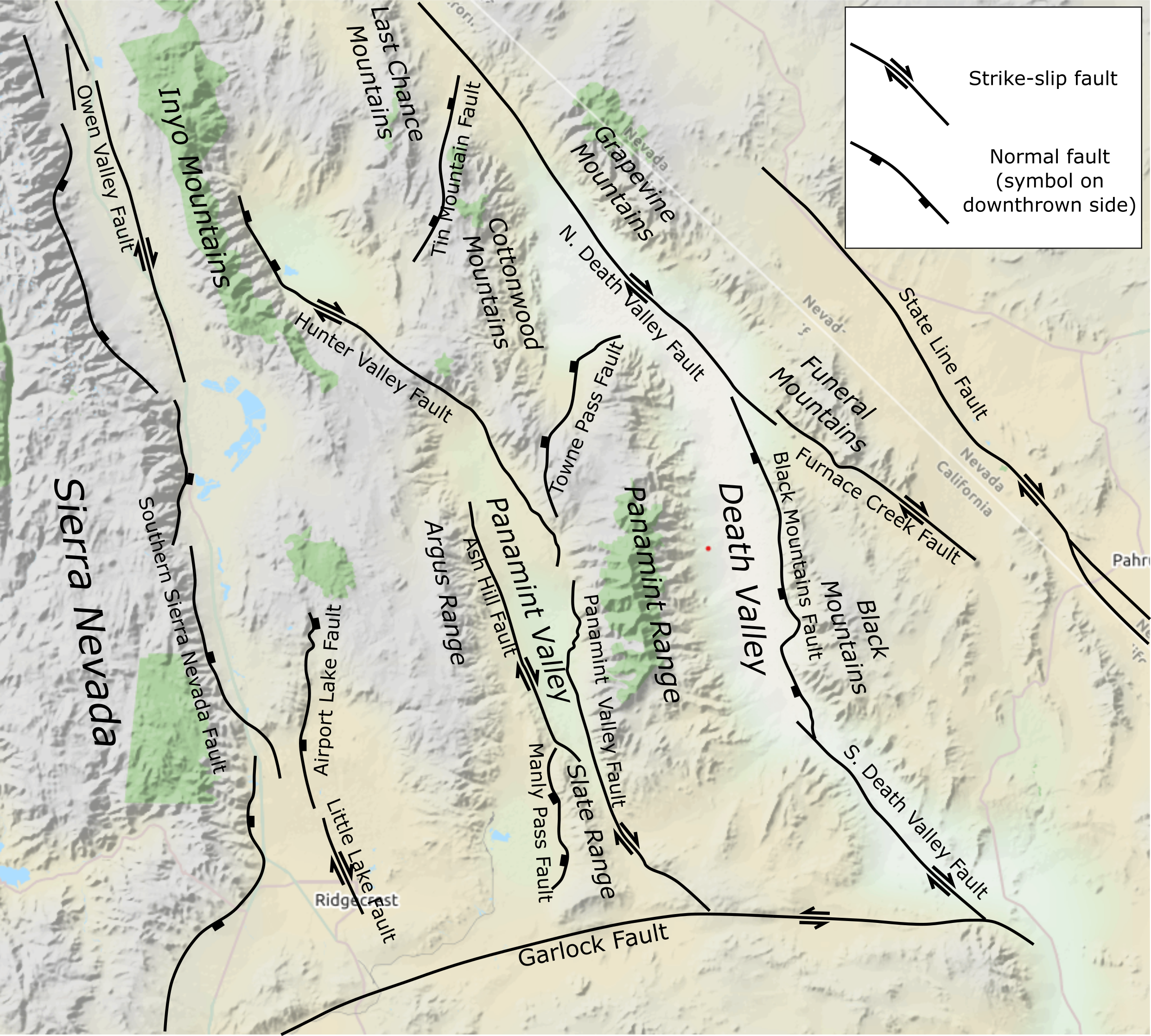
Faults in the Death Valley area active during the Quaternary

The Quaternary tectonics of the Death Valley area show the increasing impact of right-lateral strike-slip faulting. Death Valley itself is currently an active pull-apart basin developed between the Northern and Southern Death Valley Faults, with mainly normal faulting along the Black Mountains Fault zone between these two major strike-slip fault zones. These faults form part of a broader zone of faulting that extends between the eastern edge of the Sierra Nevada just across the border into Nevada, part of the southern Walker Lane (also described as the northern part of the Eastern California Shear Zone). The Walker Lane currently accommodates a significant part of the plate boundary motion between the Pacific Plate and the North American Plate and it has been proposed that this proportion will increase over time, with this zone eventually becoming the site of the plate boundary, accompanied by abandonment of the San Andreas Fault. However, there are currently no right-lateral strike-slip faults that pass through the Garlock Fault at the southern end of this zone, suggesting that this change will not occur for several millions of years at the earliest.

According to GPS data, the southern part of the Walker Lane accommodates 9–12 mm per year of right lateral shear. Only about half of this amount can be explained by movement on the main fault zones, with the remainder being distributed on smaller, less well-defined structures. There have been no historical earthquakes in the Death Valley area, but major earthquakes have occurred on other faults within the southern Walker Lane, such as the M7.4 1872 Owens Valley earthquake on the Owens Valley Fault and the M7.1 mainshock of the 2019 Ridgecrest earthquakes, which was a result of movement on previously unmapped NW-SE trending right lateral strike-slip fault strands, close to the Little Lake and Airport Lake faults. Holocene ruptures have been identified on most of the major faults in the area.

== Table of formations ==
This table of formations exposed in the Death Valley area lists and describes the exposed formations of the Death Valley National Park and the surrounding area.

System	Series	Formation	Lithology and thickness	Characteristic fossils
Quaternary	Holocene		Fan gravel; silt and salt on floor of playa, less than 100 feet (30 m) thick	None
	Pleistocene		Fan gravel; silt and salt buried under floor of playa; perhaps 2,000 feet (600 m) thick	
		Funeral fanglomerate	Cemented fan gravel with interbedded basaltic lavas, gravels cut by veins of calcite (Mexican onyx); perhaps 1,000 feet (300 m) thick	Diatoms, pollen
Tertiary	Pliocene	Furnace Creek Formation	Cemented gravel, silty and saliferous playa deposits; various salts, especially borates, more than 5,000 feet (1,500 m) thick	Scarce
	Miocene	Artist Drive Formation	Cemented gravel; playa deposits, much volcanic debris, perhaps 5,000 feet (1,500 m) thick	Scarce
	Oligocene	Titus Canyon Formation	Cemented gravel; mostly stream deposits; 3,000 feet (900 m) thick	Vertebrates, titanotheres, etc.
	Eocene and Paleocene		Granitic intrusions and volcanics, not known to be represented by sedimentary deposits	
Cretaceous and Jurassic		Not represented, area was being eroded		
Triassic		Butte Valley Formation of Johnson (1957)	Exposed in Butte Valley 1 mile (1.6 km) south of this area; 8,000 feet (2,400 m) of metasediments and volcanics	Ammonites, smooth-shelled brachiopods, belemnites, and hexacorals
	Pennsylvanian and Permian	Formations at east foot of Tucki Mountain	Conglomerate, limestone, and some shale. Conglomerate contains cobbles of limestone of Mississippian, Pennsylvanian, and Permian age. Limestone and shale contain spherical chert nodules. Abundant fusulinids. Thickness uncertain on account of faulting; estimate 3,000 feet (900 m), top eroded.	Beds with fusulinids, especially Fusulinella
Carboniferous	Mississippian and Pennsylvanian	Rest Spring Shale	Mostly shale, some limestone, abundant spherical chert nodules. Thickness uncertain because of faulting; estimate 750 feet (230 m).	None
	Mississippian	Tin Mountain Limestone and younger limestone	Mapped as 1 unit. Tin Mountain Limestone 1,000 feet (300 m) thick, is black with thin-bedded lower member and thick-bedded upper member. Unnamed limestone formation, 725 feet (221 m) thick, consists of interbedded chert and limestone in thin beds and in about equal proportions.	Mixed brachiopods, corals, and crinoid stems. Syringopora (open-spaced colonies) Caninia cf. C. cornicula.
Devonian	Middle and Upper Devonian	Lost Burro Formation	Limestone in light and dark beds 1 to 10 feet (0.30 to 3.05 m) thick give striped effect on mountainsides. Two quartzite beds, each about 3 feet (0.91 m) thick, near base, numerous sandstone beds 800 to 1,000 feet (240 to 300 m) above base. Top 200 feet (60 m) is well-bedded limestone and quartzite. Total thickness uncertain because of faulting; estimated 2,000 feet (600 m).	Brachiopods abundant, especially Spirifer, Cyrtospirifer, Productilla, Carmarotoechia, Atrypa. Stromatoporoids. Syringopora (closely spaced colonies).
Silurian and Devonian	Silurian and Lower Devonian	Hidden Valley Dolomite	Thick-bedded, fine-grained, and even-grained dolomite, mostly light color. Thickness 300 to 1,400 feet (90 to 430 m).	Crinoid stems abundant, Including large types. Favosites.
Ordovician	Upper Ordovician	Ely Springs Dolomite	Massive black dolomite, 400 to 800 feet (120 to 240 m) thick.	Streptelasmatid corals: Grewingkia, Bighornia. Brachiopods.
	Middle and Upper (?) Ordovician	Eureka Quartzite	Massive quartzite, with thin-bedded quartzite at base and top, 350 feet (110 m) thick.	None
	Lower and Middle Ordovician	Pogonip Group	Dolomite, with some limestone, at base, shale unit in middle, massive dolomite at top. Thickness, 1,500 feet (460 m).	Abundant large gastropods in massive dolomite at top: Palliseria and Maclurites, associated with Receptaculites. In lower beds: Protopliomerops, Kirkella, Orthid brachiopods.
Cambrian	Upper Cambrian	Nopah Formation	Highly fossiliferous shale member 100 feet (30 m) thick at base, upper 1,200 feet (370 m) is dolomite in thick alternating black and light hands about 100 feet (30 m) thick. Total thickness of formation 1,200 to 1,500 feet (370 to 460 m).	In upper part, gastropods. In basal 100 feet (30 m), trilobite trash beds containing Elburgis, Pseudagnostus, Horriagnostris, Elvinia, Apsotreta.
	Middle and Upper Cambrian	Bonanza King Formation	Mostly thick-bedded arid massive dark-colored dolomite, thin-bedded limestone member 500 feet (150 m) thick 1,000 feet (300 m) below top of formation, 2 brown-weathering shaIy units, upper one fossiliferous, Total thickness Uncertain because of faulting; estimated about 3,000 feet (900 m) in Panamint Range, 2,000 feet (600 m) in Funeral Mountains.	The only fossiliferous bed is shale below limestone member neat middle of formation. This shale contains linguloid brachiopods and trilobite trash beds with fragments of "Ehmaniella."
	Lower and Middle Cambrian	Carrara Formation	An alternation of shaly and silty members with limestone members transitional between underlying clastic formations and overlying carbonate ones. Thickness about 1,000 feet (300 m) but variable because of shearing.	Numerous trilobite trash beds in lower part yield fragments of olenellid trilobites.
	Lower Cambrian	Zabriskie Quartzite	Quartzite, mostly massive arid granulated due to shearing, locally it) beds 6 inches (15 cm) to 2 feet (0.61 m) thick. Thickness more than 150 feet (46 m), variable because of shearing.	No fossils
	Lower Cambrian and Lower Cambrian (?)	Wood Canyon Formation	Basal unit is well-bedded quartzite above 1,650 feet (500 m) thick ' shaly Unit above this 520 feet (160 m) thick contains lowest olenellids in section; top unit of dolomite and quartzite 400 feet (120 m) thick.	A few scattered olenellid trilobites and archaeocyathids in upper part of formation. Scolithus? tubes.
		Stirling Quartzite	Well-bedded quartzite in beds 1 to 5 feet (0.30 to 1.52 m) thick comprising thick members of quartzite 700 to 800 feet (210 to 240 m) thick separated by 500 feet (150 m) of purple shale, crossbedding conspicuous in quartzite. Maximum thickness about 2,000 feet (600 m).	None
		Johnnie Formation	Mostly shale, in part olive brown, in part purple. Basal member 400 feet (120 m) thick is interbedded dolomite arid quartzite with pebble conglomerate. Locally, fair dolomite near middle arid at top. Thickness more than 4,000 feet (1,200 m).	None
Precambrian		Noonday Dolomite	In southern Panamint Range, dolomite in Indistinct beds; lower part cream colored, upper part gray. Thickness 800 feet (240 m). Farther north, where mapped as Noonday(?) Dolomite, contains much limestone, tan and white, and some limestone conglomerate. Thickness about 1,000 feet (300 m).	Scolithus? tubes
		Unconformity		
		Kingston Peak(?) Formation	Mostly diamictite, sandstone, and shale; some limestone arid dolomite olistoliths near middle. At least 3,000 feet (900 m) thick. Although tentatively assigned to Kingston Peak Formation, similar rocks along west side of Panamint Range have been identified as Kingston Peak.	None.
		Beck Spring Dolomite	Not mapped; outcrops are to the west. Blue-gray cherry dolomite, thickness estimated about 500 feet (150 m) Identification uncertain.	None
	Pahrump Series	Crystal Spring Formation	Recognized only in Galena Canyon and south. Total thickness about 2,000 feet (600 m). Consists of basal conglomerate overlain by quartzite that grades upward into purple shale arid thinly bedded dolomite, upper part, thick bedded dolomite, diabase, and chert. Talc deposits where diabase intrudes dolomite.	None
		Unconformity		
		Rocks of the crystalline basement	Metasedimentary rocks with granitic intrusions	None

== Table of salts ==
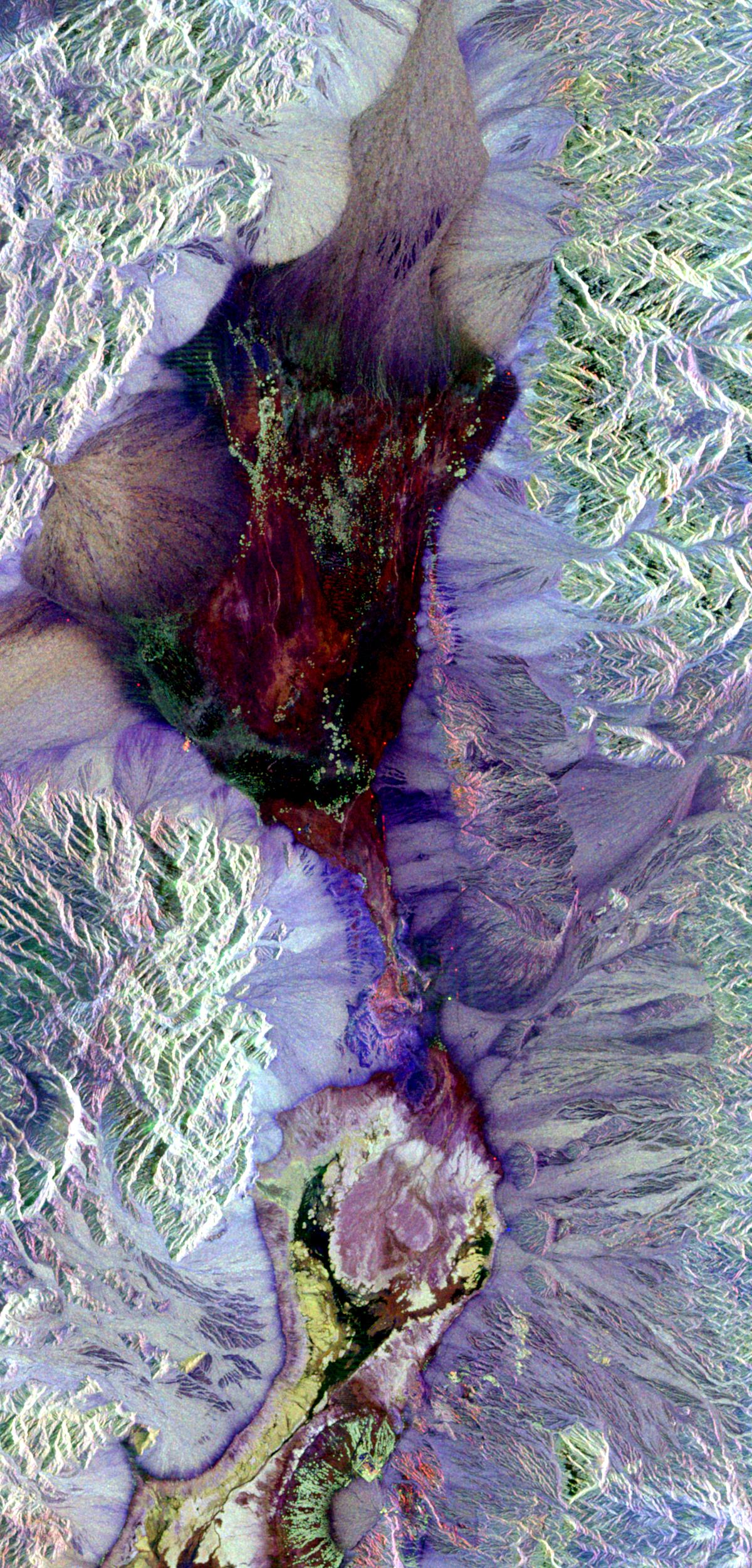
This false-color radar image shows central Death Valley and the different surface types in the area. Radar is sensitive to surface roughness with rough areas showing up brighter than smooth areas, which appear dark. This is seen in the contrast between the bright mountains that surround the dark, smooth basins and valleys of Death Valley. The image shows Furnace Creek alluvial fan (green crescent feature) at the far right, and the sand dunes near Stove Pipe Wells at the center. (NASA image)

Table of salts found in Death Valley
Mineral	Composition	Known or probable occurrence
Halite	NaCl	Principal constituent of chloride zone and of salt-impregnated sulfate and carbonate deposits.
Sylvite	KCl	With halite.
Trona	Na_{3}H(CO_{3})_{2}2H_{2}O	Carbonate zone of Cottonball Basin, especially in marshes.
Thermonatrite	Na_{2}CO_{3}·H_{2}O	Questionably present on floodplain in Badwater Basin, would be expected in marshes of carbonate zone in Cottonball Basin.
Gaylussite	Na_{2}Ca(CO_{3})2·5H_{2}O	Carbonate zone and floodplain in Badwater Basin.
Calcite	CaCO_{3}	Occurs as clastic grains in sediments underlying salt pan and as sharply terminated crystals in clay fraction of carbonate zone and in sediments underlying sulfate zone.
Magnesite	MgCO_{3}	Obtained in artificially evaporated brines from Death Valley; not yet identified in salt pan; may be expected in carbonate zone of Cottonball Basin.
Dolomite	CaMg(CO_{3})2	identified only as a detrital mineral; may be expected in carbonate zone.
Northupite and/or tychite	Na_{3}MgCl(CO_{3}) and/or Na_{6}Mg_{2}(SO_{4})·(CO_{3})_{4}	An isotropic mineral, having index of refraction in the range of Northupite and Tychite, has been observed in saline facies of sulfate zone in Cottonball Basin.
Burkeite	Na_{6}(CO_{3})(SO_{4})_{2}	Sulfate zone in Cottonball Basin.
Thenardite	Na_{2}SO_{4}	Common in all zones in Cottonball Basin and in sulfate marshes in Middle and Badwater basins.
Mirabilite	Na_{2}SO_{4}·10H_{2}O	Occurs on floodplains in Cottonball Basin immediately following winter storms.
Glauberite	Na_{2}Ca(SO_{4})_{2}	Common on floodplains except in central part of Badwater Basin; sulfate zone in Cottonball Basin.
Anhydrite	CaSO_{4}	As layer capping massive gypsum 1 mile (2 km) north of Badwater. Possibly also as dry-period efflorescence on floodplains.
Bassanite	2CaSO_{4}·H_{2}O	As layer capping massive gypsum along west side of Badwater Basin and as dry-period efflorescence in floodplains.
Gypsum	CaSO_{4}·2H_{2}O	In sulfate caliche, layer in carbonate zone, particularly in Middle and Badwater basins, in sulfate marshes and as massive deposits in sulfate zone.
Bloedite	Na_{2}Mg(SO_{4})_{2}·4H_{2}O	Questionably present in efflorescence on floodplain in chloride zone.
Polyhalite	K_{2}Ca2Mg(SO_{4})_{4}·2H_{2}O	Questionably present on floodplain in chloride zone.
Celestine	SrSO_{4}	Found with massive gypsum.
Kernite	Na_{2}B_{4}O_{7}·4H_{2}O	Possibly present in Middle Basin in surface layer of layered sulfate and chloride salts.
Tincalconite	Na_{2}B_{4}O_{7}·5H_{2}O	Probably occurs as dehydration product of borax.
Borax	Na_{2}B_{4}O_{7}·10H_{2}O	Floodplains and marshes in Cottonball Basin.
Inyoite	Ca_{2}B_{6}O_{11}·13H_{2}O	Questionably present (X-ray determination but unsatisfactory) in floodplain in Badwater Basin.
Meyerhofferite	Ca_{2}B_{6}O_{11}·7H_{2}O	Found in all zones in Badwater Basin and in rough silty rock salt in Cottonball Basin
Colemanite	Ca_{2}B_{6}O_{11}·5H_{2}O	Questionably present (X-ray determination but unsatisfactory) in floodplain in Badwater Basin.
Ulexite	NaCaB_{5}O_{9}·8H_{2}O	Common in floodplain in Cottonball Basin; known as "cottonball"
Proberite	NaCaB_{5}O_{9}·5H_{2}O	A fibrous borate with index of refraction higher than ulexite occurs on dry areas in Cottonball Basin following hot dry spells and in surface layer of smooth silty rock salt.
Soda niter	NaNO_{3}	Weak, but positive chemical tests obtained locally.

== See also ==
- Places of interest in the Death Valley area
- Category: Death Valley
- Category: Geology of California
