= Tulaneia =

Tulaneia Temporal range: latest Ediacaran ~540–538.8 Ma

Scientific classification
- Kingdom: Animalia
- Phylum: †Petalonamae
- Class: †Erniettomorpha
- Family: †Erniettidae
- Genus: †Tulaneia; Runnegar and Horodyski in Runnegar et al., 2025
- Species: †T. amabilia

Binomial name
- †Tulaneia amabilia Runnegar and Horodyski in Runnegar et al., 2025

Extinct lyre-shaped genus of erniettomorph

Tulaneia is an extinct organism from the latest Ediacaran of Nevada, and was alive around 540 – 538.8 Ma. With a lyre-shaped body, it is a part of the class Erniettomorpha, and is also a monotypic genus, containing only Tunlaneia amabilia. It was previously assigned to Ernietta in 1991.

== Discovery and naming ==
The fossil material of Tulaneia were found in the Lower Member of the Wood Canyon Formation in Nevada, and were originally attributed to Ernietta in 1991. Fossil material that had previously been collected during 1991 after this assignment would become the holotype and paratypes after re-description in 2024, and thus be formally re-assigned and named in 2025.

The generic name Tulaneia is in honour of the Tulane University in New Orleans, due to its encouragement and support of research in paleontology and natural history overall, as seen through one of the authors of the 2025 study, Robert J. Horodyski. The specific name amabilia derives from the Latin word amabilis, to mean "lovely", in reference to exceptional preservation of the fossil material.

== Description ==
Tulaneia amabilis is a lyre-shaped erniettomorph, which is composed of up to 30 tubular modules, which can get up to 5 mm (0.2 in) in width, and 9 mm (0.4 in) in depth. The modules themselves are arranged in a palisade-like construction, getting to their aforementioned widest point at the proximal edge of the body itself, decreasing in width and separating towards the distal end, terminating at a blunt point. In one specimen, the tips notably bifurcate, splitting out into two tips rather than one, which has been inferred to be unique to the genus, although it is noted the possibly of developmental abnormality is not ruled out entirely.

Tulaneia was noted to share similarities with a Dickinsonia-like fossil from the Farm Aar locality in Namibia, although it was further noted that the Dickinsonia-like fossil has modules growing from a central mid-line, whilst Tulaneia has unidirectional growth. The modules themselves also differ, as in Tulaneia, they are consistent along the long axis of the organism, something also seen in other erniettamorphs, whilst the modules of the Dickinsonia-like fossil are not consistent.

== Palaeoenvironment ==
All fossils of Tulaneia were noted to have been completely, or partially, filled in with clean quartz sand before they were buried, with the quartz sand contrasting with the surrounding matrix and rock the fossils where suspended within. From this, it has been inferred that Tulaneia lived in a high-energy shore-face environment, similar to what is seen in the Stirling Quartzite which underlies the Wood Canyon Formation, or it was transported from an onshore to an offshore environment during a storm surge event, being deposited alongside cobbles in a deep-water environment.

== See also ==
- List of Ediacaran genera
