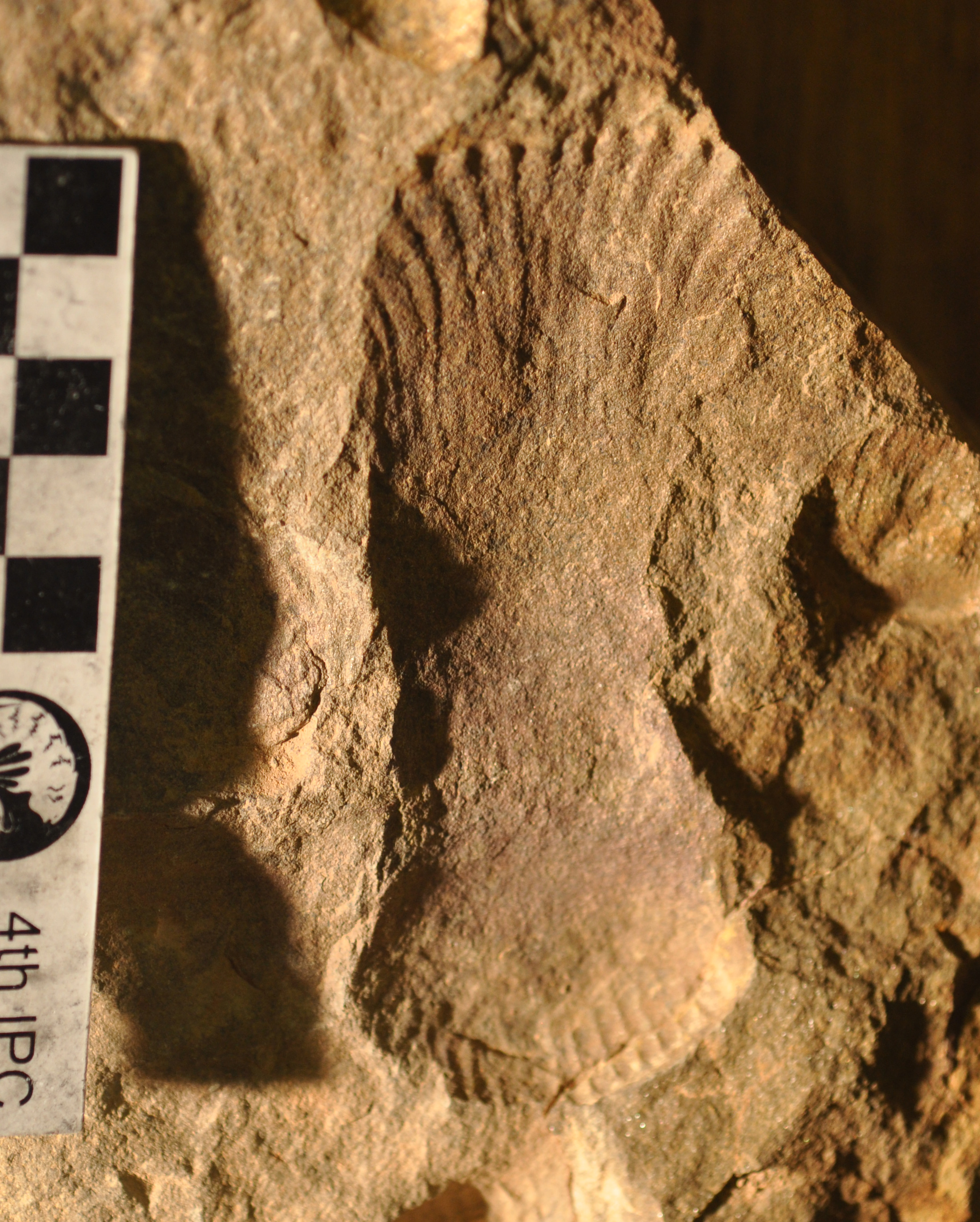
- Fossil of the type genus, Ernietta

Scientific classification
- Kingdom: Animalia
- Phylum: †Petalonamae
- Class: †Erniettomorpha
- Family: †Erniettidae; Pflug, 1972

Genera
- † Ernietta; † Tulaneia

Synonyms
- See: text

= Erniettidae =

Erniettidae Temporal range: late Ediacaran ~548–538.8 Ma

Extinct family of bag-like organisms

Erniettidae is an extinct family of the class Erniettomorpha, which is considered a part of the wider phylum Petalonamae. They were alive during the late Ediacaran, from around from 548 to 538.8 Ma, and are most notable for their bag-like appearance, and infaunal lifestyle. It was originally created in 1972 to contain upwards of 12 genera previously split out from Ernietta, although it now only contains two valid genera.

== Description ==
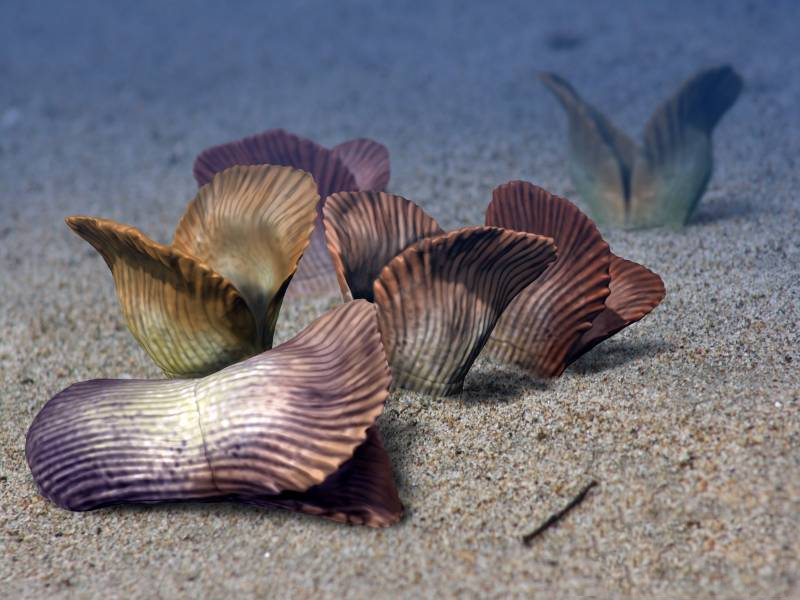
A reconstruction of a group Ernietta plateauensis.

Created in 1972 by Pflug, erniettids are predominately rounded, bag-like organisms constructed of up to 70 tubular modules arranged in parallel arrays akin to palisade walls, whilst some are more lyre-like in shape. The walls of these organisms were likely organic in nature, and were made up of an outer-wall and inner-wall, with each module distally terminating with a stubby or conical end, whilst others end with more pointed terminations. Erniettids are commonly found living in infaunal shallow-water marine environments.

== Distribution ==
Genera of the family Erniettidae can be found in Nama Group in Namibia, Africa, and the uppermost Ediacaran of the Wood Canyon Formation in Nevada, United States.

== Taxonomy ==
Erniettidae currently includes the following genera:

- †Ernietta Pflug, 1966
  - †Ernietta plateauensis Pflug, 1966
- †Tulaneia Runnegar et Horodyski in Runnegar et al., 2025
  - †Tulaneia amabilia Runnegar et Horodyski in Runnegar et al., 2025

=== Original classifications ===
When created in 1972 by Pflug, it originally contained up to 13 genera, Ernietta included. Some of these genera where included in subfamilies, and had multiple species. These genera, their respective species, and the subfamilies they were a part of have since 1981 been rejected and or synonymized back into Ernietta, due to most of them being the result of minor preservational and taphonomic differences. As per Martin Glaessner 1979, these were as follows, noting any synonymization that had already taken place:

Subfamily †Erniettinae Pflug, 1972

- †Ernietta Pflug, 1966
  - †Ernietta plateauensis Pflug, 1966
  - †Ernietta aarensis Pflug, 1972
  - †Ernietta tsachanabis Pflug, 1972
- †Erniofossa Pflug, 1972
  - †Erniofossa prognatha Pflug, 1972
- †Ernionorma Pflug, 1972
  - †Ernionorma abyssoides Pflug, 1972
  - †Ernionorma peltis Pflug, 1972
  - †Ernionorma clausula Pflug, 1972
  - †Ernionorma rector Pflug, 1972
  - †Ernionorma corrector Pflug, 1972
  - †Ernionorma tribunalis Pflug, 1972

Erniettinids were noted to be flattened to hemicylindrical in nature, and have tubular modules separated by a clear zigzagged median line. The subfamilies Ernionominae and Erniodiscinae were combined with Erniettinae. On a genus level, Erniodiscus and Erniaster were synonymized with Erniofossa, whilst Erniobaris would be synonymized into Ernionorma.

Subfamily †Erniobetinae Pflug, 1972

- †Erniobeta Pflug, 1972
  - †Erniobeta scapulosa Pflug, 1972
  - †Erniobeta forensis Pflug, 1972
- †Erniograndis Pflug, 1972
  - †Erniograndis sandalix Pflug, 1972
  - †Erniograndis paraglossa Pflug, 1972

Erniobetinids are noted to have tall, columnar bodies, with the median line positioned near the apex and bore transverse, incised sutures.

The following taxa would be rejected and synonymized into Ernietta by Glaessner, 1979:

Family †Erniotaxidae Pflug, 1972

- Subdamily †Erniotaxinae Pflug, 1972
  - †Erniotaxis Pflug, 1972
    - †Erniotaxis segmentrix Pflug, 1972

Unattributed to a family

- †Erniocarpus Pflug, 1972
  - †Erniocarpus carpoides Pflug, 1972
- †Erniocentris Pflug, 1972
  - †Erniocentris centriformis Pflug, 1972
- †Erniocoris Pflug, 1972
  - †Erniocoris orbiformis Pflug, 1972
- †Erniopelta Pflug, 1972
  - †Erniopelta scrupula Pflug, 1972
