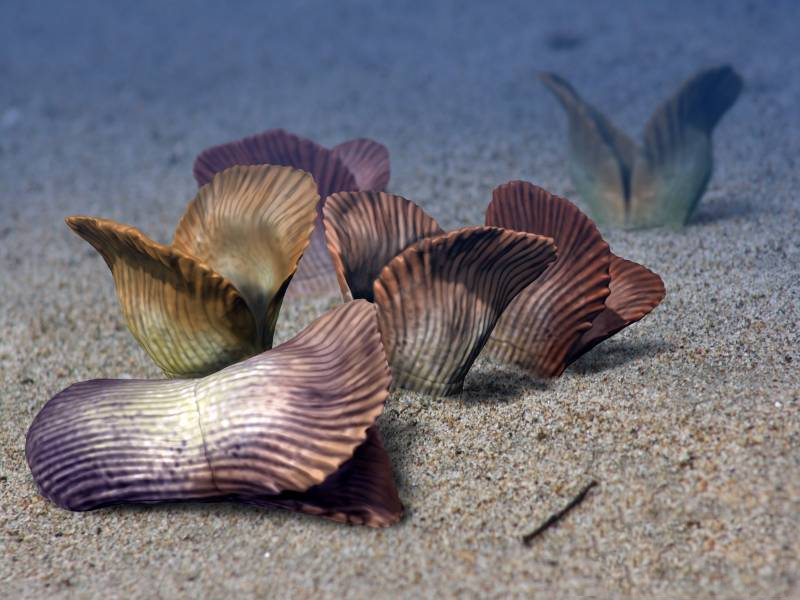
- CGI reconstruction of an E. plateauensis colony

Scientific classification
- Kingdom: Animalia
- Phylum: †Petalonamae
- Class: †Erniettomorpha
- Family: †Erniettidae
- Genus: †Ernietta
- Species: †E. plateauensis

Binomial name
- †Ernietta plateauensis Pflug, 1966

Synonyms
- See text

= Ernietta =

Ernietta Temporal range: late Ediacaran ~548–541 Ma

Extinct genus of bag-like erniettomorph

Ernietta is an extinct organism from the late Ediacaran of Namibia, and was alive around 548 – 541 Ma, and lived infaunally within substrates. Based of the preservation of fossil material and modelling, it has been found that Ernietta was sessile in nature, and had a sack-shaped body. It is a monotypic genus, containing only Ernietta plateauensis.

It has been found that its original holotype fossil is more likely to be a specimen of Pteridinium simplex, another erniettomorph. As such, a neotype has been proposed, using the original holotype specimen of the now synonymized Erniograndis sandalix.

== Discovery ==
Fossils of Ernietta, including the holotype and proposed neotype, were found in the Buchholzbrunn Member of the Dabis Formation, in Namibia, Africa.

== Description ==
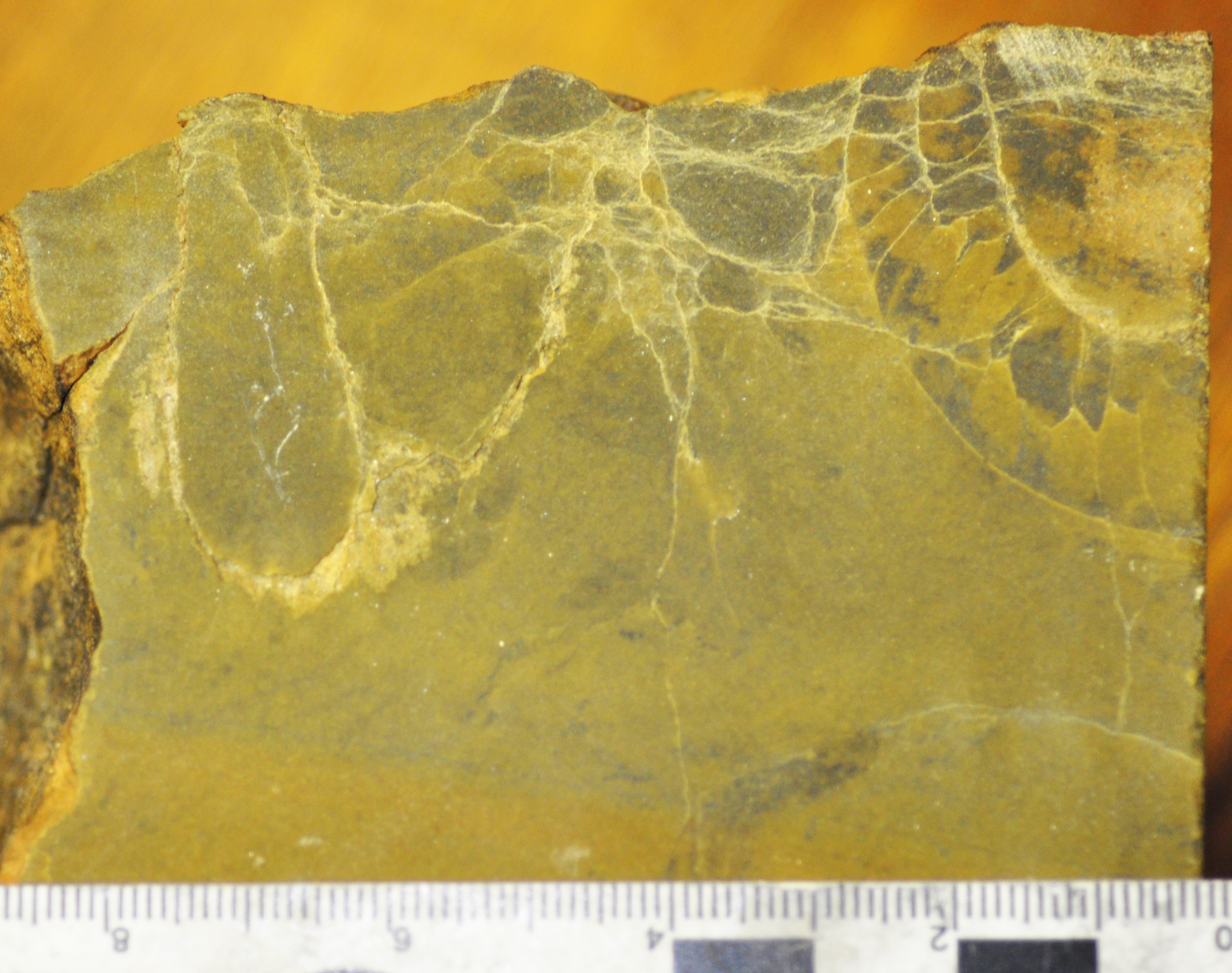
Cross-sectional view of Ernietta plateauensis from the Ediacaran Kliphoek Member of the Dabis Formation. Farm Aar, near Aus, Namibia.

Ernietta plateauensis is a sack-shaped erniettomorph, which is composed of organic walls that are oval-shaped in cross section, whilst they are U to V-shaped in a lateral profile, and is known to get up to 15 cm (6 in) in length. The walls are made up of 70 tubular modules that meet at a zig-zag median line at its based, which when nearing the dorsal margin they begin to separate, terminating with a pointed end, and range from 1–6 mm (0–0 in) in width. On well preserved and complete specimens, a notable suture is also present on the upper parts of the organism. Some specimens of Ernietta have been found with fragments of an outer wall, although this is notably rare, and has been suggested these may either be the result of abnormal development, regeneration after injury, or an unknown taphonomic process. The suture itself has also been inferred to possibly be the result of traumatic injury, with the top of the organism being torn off during a storm-surge, and recovering after, resulting in the suture. This has been backed up by the suture being lower on specimens from other localities.

A large collection of notably small specimens of Ernietta, with the smallest measuring at 4 mm (0 in) in diameter and being composed of only four visible modules, and one only 1 mm (0 in) in diameter and being entirely composed of a singular module, was found in the type locality of the Buchholzbrunn Member. Noted to have most likely been transported to their final positions, likely being hydrodynamically similar to pebbles, it has been inferred that this collection of specimens represent larval to juvenile stages of Ernietta. It is likely that Ernietta grew with the insertion of new modules at one or both ends of the median line, although it is noted that the varied preservation makes this difficult to confirm.

== Paleoecology ==
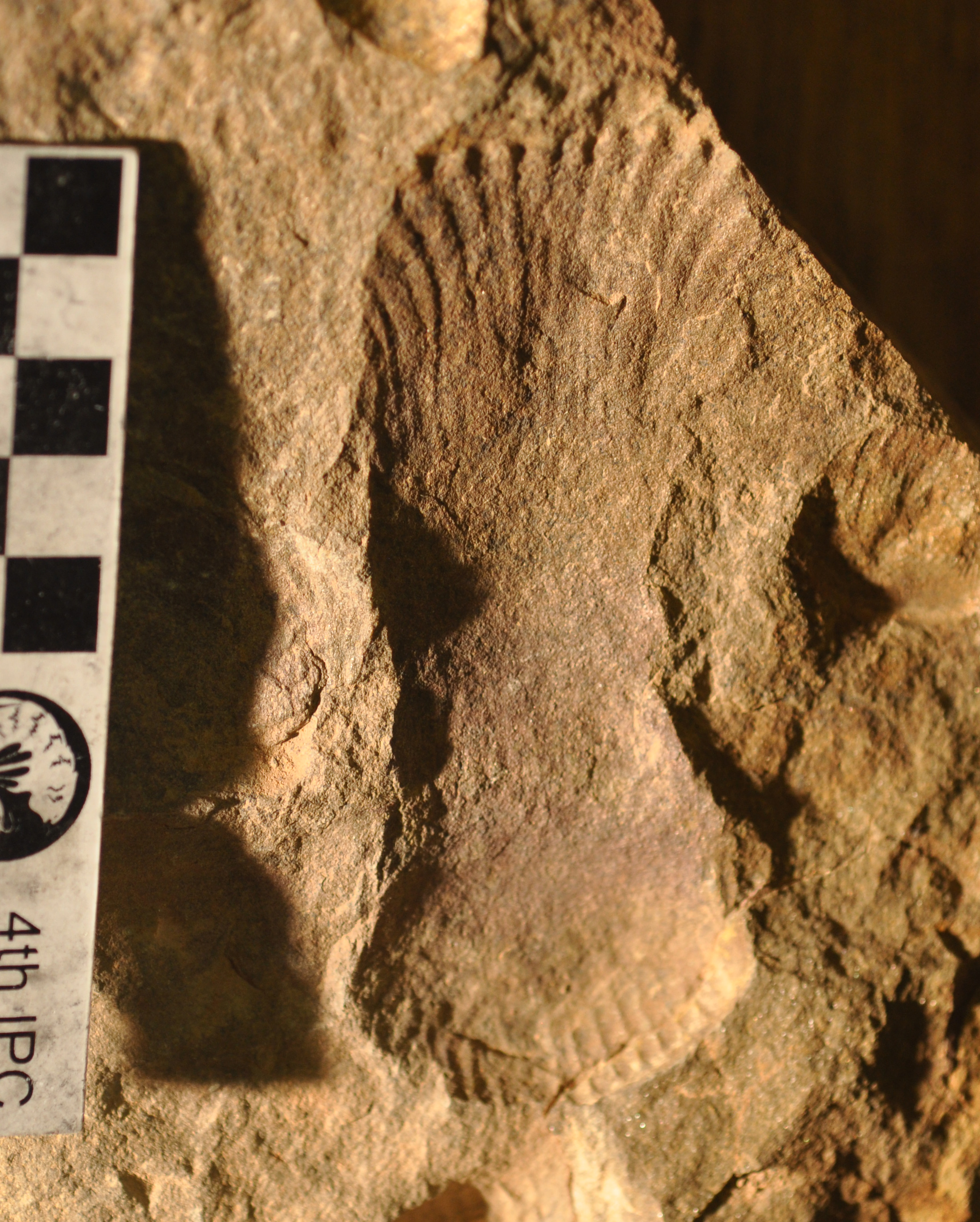
Ernietta plateauensis from the Kliphoek Member of the Dabis Formation. Farm Aar, Namibia.

Ernietta lived an infaunal lifestyle, inferred from a new locality discovered in 2016 at the Farm Aar site in southern Namibia, which recovered a number of specimens preserved in situ. The depositional environment of the site in question has been interpreted as sub-tidal, with periodic influxes of storm-induced sands. After this, a further study was undertaken, which confirmed that individuals did live partly buried in the substrate, and were also filled to some degree by sediments settling inside the organism. This would have resulted from nutrient filled water slowly flowing into and circulating within the cavity of Ernietta, which would have been aided by the frill of Ernietta possessing a shape similar to an "upturned bell", making Ernietta a suspension feeder. As for how it collected the collected nutrients is unknown, and it has been suggested that the structures to undertake this were not preserved in fossils.

Based on hydrodynamic modelling on Ernietta, it has been inferred that it likely inhabited shallow water marine environments, and lived in large aggregations. The tendency for Ernietta to form these aggregations with multiple other individuals has been noted to have likely optimized the delivery of nutrients, with it enhancing the vertical mixing and direction of nutrient-rich currents into the cavities of individuals downstream. As such, it has been interpreted as the earliest example of commensalism, where organisms act to mutual benefit. The shallow water marine interpretation has been back up later studies, with Ernietta only being found in shallow marine facies at Farm Hansburg. The facies in question represents a protected shallow marine environment, with limited wave- and storm-influence, likely permitting the aggregations of Ernietta to thrive, and be better preserved.

Other forms of feeding have also been put forward, such as Ernietta absorbing nutrients passively, although later studies discounted this due to the high volume to surface area ratio observed in Ernietta. One researcher, Gregory Retallack (1994) proposed that Ernietta may have instead gotten nutrients via associated symbiotic algae. Retallack has also suggested that Ernietta may have lived in freshwater environments, based on its low boron content compared to other Ediacaran fossils. He has also noted that specimens have been found covered with thin layers of wind-drift sand from alluvial levees.

== Distribution ==
Ernietta is known from the Kuibis Subgroup of the Nama Group in Namibia. Ernietta had previously been reported from the Wood Canyon Formation in Nevada, although a later study would see these specimens re-assigned to the genus Tulenia in 2025. Another potential occurrence has been noted in Windermere group of British Columbia in Canada, although this had yet to be formally described. Alongside this, records of Ernietta-like fossils have been found in older strata of the Brachina Subgroup.

== Taxonomy and history ==
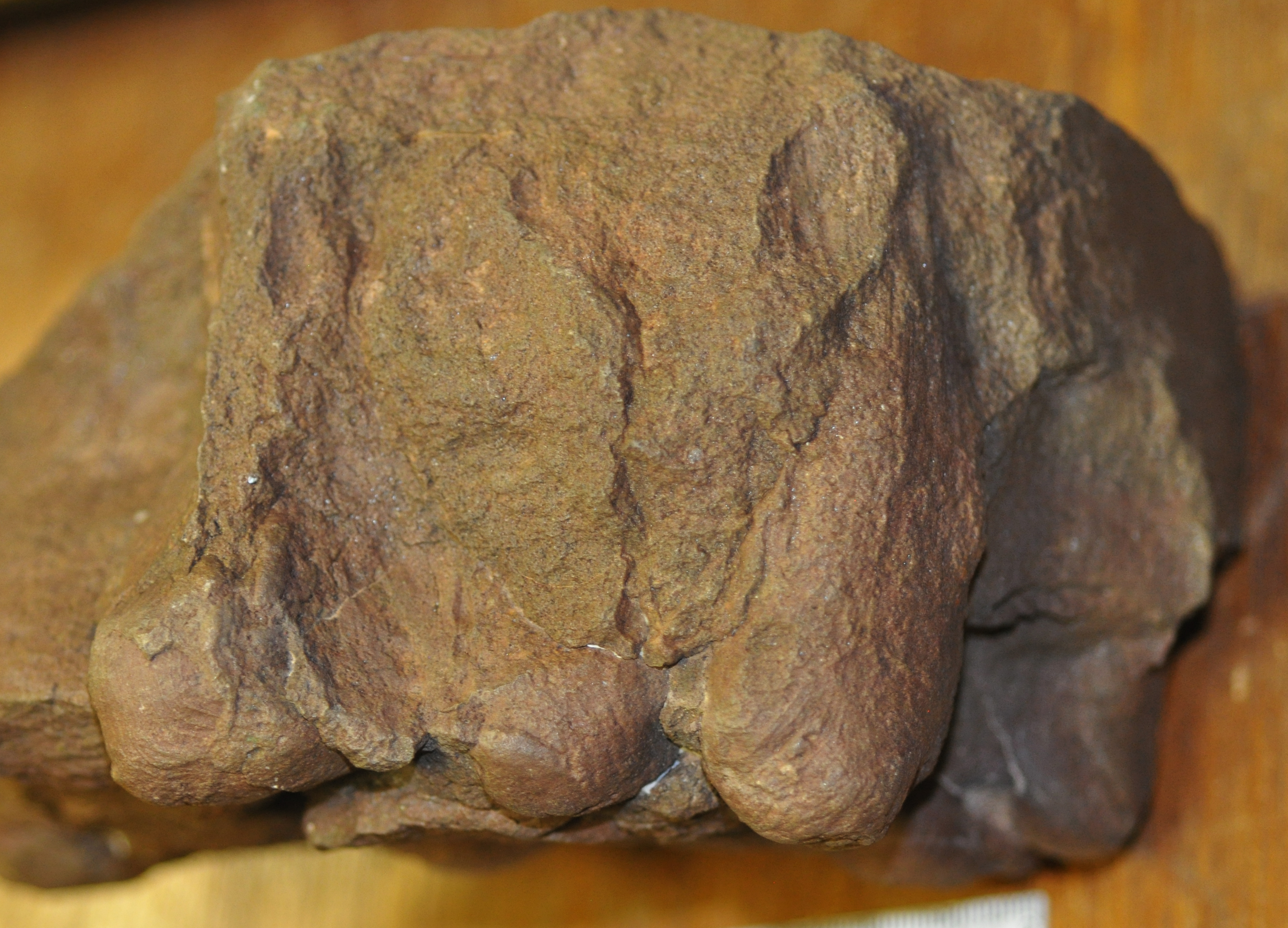
Congregation of multiple individuals of E. plateauensis from the Ediacaran Kilhoek Member of the Dabis Formation in Farm Aar, Aus, Namibia.

Ernietta has always been placed within the class Erniettomorpha under the family Erniettidae, for which it is the type genus of both. Although, it has been noted by Runnegar et al. (2024), the holotype fossil of Ernietta is more likely to be a specimen of Pteridinium simplex, which would make Ernietta a junior synonym of Pteridinium. As such, it has been proposed that the original holotype fossil of Erniograndis sandalix to be designated neotype of Ernietta, as to retain the usage of a well known and used name.

Ernietta itself contains only one species, Ernietta plateauensis, which was described in 1966 by Pflug. In 1972, Pflug would describe a large number of new fossils, creating 11 new genera and 24 new species, all of which would later slowly be synonymized back into Ernietta plateauensis. These synonymized taxa were as follows:

- Ernietta tschanabis Phlug, 1972

E. aarensis Phlug, 1972

- Erniaster aportus Phlug, 1972

E. patellus Phlug, 1972

- Erniobaris baroides Phlug, 1972

E. epistuta Phlug, 1972
E. gula Phlug, 1972
E. parietalis Phlug, 1972

- Erniobeta forensis Phlug, 1972

E. scapulosa Phlug, 1972

- Erniocarpus sermo Phlug, 1972
- Erniocentris centriformis Phlug, 1972
- Erniodiscus clypeus Phlug, 1972

E. rutilus Phlug, 1972

- Erniofossa prognatha Phlug, 1972
- Erniograndis paraglossa Phlug, 1972

E. sandalix Phlug, 1972

- Ernionorma abyssoides Phlug, 1972

E. clausula Phlug, 1972
E. peltis Phlug, 1972
E. rector Phlug, 1972
E. tribunalis Phlug, 1972

- Erniopelta scruputa Phlug, 1972
- Erniotaxis segmontrix Phlug, 1972

== See also ==
- List of Ediacaran genera
- Ediacaran biota
- Ediacaran
- Geology of Namibia
