= Nopah Formation =

Geologic formation in Utah, United States

- Stratigraphic range: Cambrian
- Type: Formation

Lithology
- Primary: dolomite, limestone
- Other: shale

Location
- Region: Utah, Nevada
- Country: United States

The Nopah Formation is a geologic formation in Utah. It preserves fossils dating back to the Cambrian period.

== See also ==
- List of fossiliferous stratigraphic units in Utah
- Paleontology in Utah
