= Noonday Dolomite =

Geologic formation in California, United States

- Stratigraphic range: Ediacaran
- Type: Geological Formation
- Sub-units: "Algal Dolomite" and "Sandy Dolomite" Members
- Underlies: Johnnie Formation
- Overlies: (Unconformably) Pahrump Group
- Thickness: 0–1,500 ft (0–457 m)

Lithology
- Primary: Dolomite
- Other: Limestone, Shale, Graywacke

Location
- Region: California
- Country: United States

The Noonday Formation is an Ediacaran aged geologic formation in California, primarily within the Death Valley, Kingston Range and the Panamint Range. Stromatolite structures are common in the formation, ranging from Domal to Tubestone structures.

== Geology ==
The Noonday Formation is composed of two members, the Lower Algal Dolomite member, and the Upper Sandy Dolomite Member. Within the eastern area of the Death Valley, there is a wedge of clastic material between these two members, consisting of lavender shale and graywacke, and further thickness going southwest. In the central and northern parts of the Panamint Range, another unit can be found in between the lower and upper members, composed of laminated silty and sandy limestones, and was formally known as the Radcliff Formation.

=== Members ===
The members within the formation are as follows, in ascending stratigraphic order (lowest to highest):

- Lower Algal Dolomite Member: This member consists of light-coloured dolomite rocks, and possibly contains the trace fossil Skolithos (Spelled in its older spelling of Scolithus), although it has been noted these are simply algal in origin. It was formally known as the Sentinel Dolomite, before the Noonday Dolomite was extended.
- Upper Sandy Dolomite Member: This member is composed of clastic dolomite, which is commonly cross-stratified. There are also detrital quartz grains found throughout the member. It was a part of the lower section of the now formally named Redlands Dolomitic Limestone, before the Noonday Dolomite was extended.

== Fossils ==
Within the Lower Algal Dolomite Member of the Noonday Formation, there can be found stromatolites layered up to 100 m (330 ft) or more in thickness, which are domal in nature and have an average diameter of 1.5 cm (0.6 in), which were previously reported as Skolithos. It was noted that if they were Skolithos burrows, they occur far below any previous reported appearance of the ichnofossil, and metazoa in general.

The Domal Stromatolites were put through multiple possible interpretations, such as being Columnar Stromatolites, which was discounted due to the overall geometry of the structures; being Solution Pipes, which was also discounted due to a lack of sub-aerial weathering between the mounds and overlying sediments; or Defluidization Channels, which, despite being favoured due to the irregular shapes and upward termination, although the nature of the fluid itself remained difficult to figure out, with the structures thus being interpreted as algal-boundstones, bioherms or reefs, in the form of Domal Stromatolites, which would give way to more sparse stromatolite mounds in the Upper Sandy Dolomitic Limestone member. The tubular structures would later be reinterpreted as Tubestone Stromatolites, due to the weak stromatolite lamination and well-developed microclotted nature of the tubes.
