= Bonanza King Formation =

Geologic formation in Nevada, United States

- Stratigraphic range: Cambrian
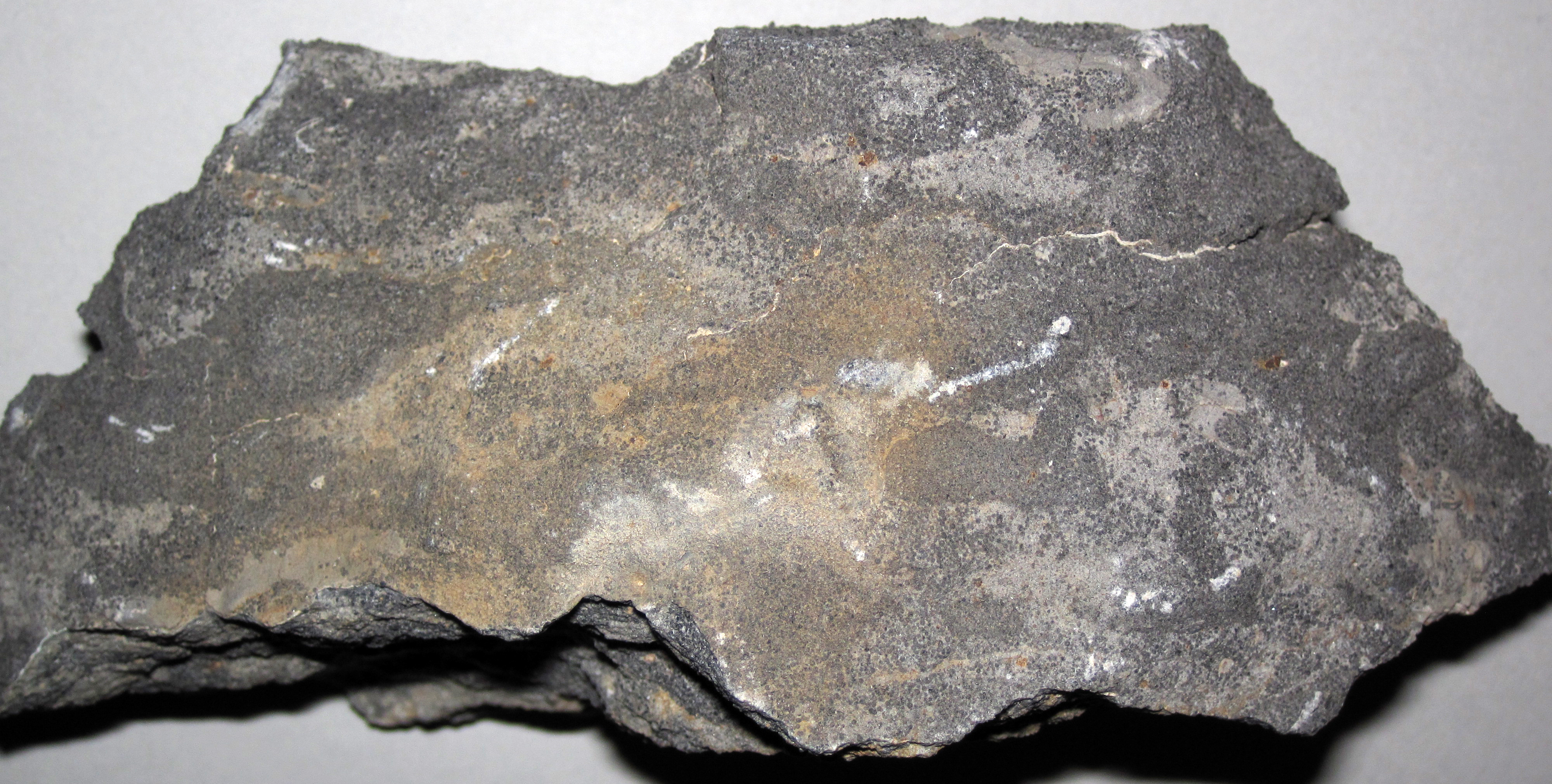
- Weathered limestone from the Bonanza King Formation (Desert Range, Nevada)
- Type: Formation

Lithology
- Primary: Limestone
- Other: Dolomite

Location
- Region: Nevada
- Country: United States

The Bonanza King Formation is a geologic formation in Nevada. It preserves fossils dating back to the Cambrian period.

== See also ==
- List of fossiliferous stratigraphic units in Nevada
- Paleontology in Nevada
