= Johnnie Formation =

Geologic formation in the Mojave Desert

- Stratigraphic range: Ediacaran 580–550 Ma
- Type: Geologic formation
- Sub-units: See: Members
- Underlies: Stirling Quartzite
- Overlies: Noonday Dolomite
- Area: 10,000 sq mi (26,000 km^{2})
- Thickness: 0–5,000 feet (0–1,524 m)

Lithology
- Primary: Shale
- Other: Siltstone, Quartzite, Conglomerate, Limestone and Dolomite

Location
- Region: Mojave Desert, California and Nevada
- Country: United States

The Johnnie Formation is a geologic formation in the northern Mojave Desert of Inyo County, California and Nevada.

It can be seen in the Providence Mountains and Kelso Mountains. It also preserves microbial mat structures dating back to the Ediacaran period of the Neoproterozoic Era.

== Geology ==
Due to the large area and thickness of the formation, the Johnnie Formation primarily consists of shales, siltstones, quartzites, conglomerates, limestones and dolomites, outcropping in the Death Valley, Kingston Range, the Funeral Mountains, as well as Nevada, in the Spring Mountains, Nevada Test Site and Desert Range. It is also highly variable compared to other formations within the wider area, making it hard to correlate it to said other formations, which are more uniform.

=== Members ===
The Johnnie Formation is composed of six members in the Kingston Range of the Death Valley, which are as follows, in ascending stratigraphic order (lowest to highest):

==== "Transitional" Member ====
This member is up to 485 ft (148 m) thick, and is dominated by very fine, medium-gray crystalline dolomite and sandy dolomite, which can weather to a pale-orange. The sandy dolomites contain fine to very coarse grains of quartz, and both the crystalline and sandy dolomite rocks contain scattered pebbles and granules of quartz. They are also inter-stratified with fine to coarse grained yellow gray quartzite, and greenish-gray siltstone, yellow gray shale and ark yellowish brown or dark gray argillite, making up 25% of the member. Algal structures are also known from this member.

==== "Quartzite" Member ====
This member is up to 480 ft (150 m) thick, and as the name suggests, is dominated by yellowish-gray, pale-brownish-gray and pinkish-gray fine to coarse-grained quartzite rock. In some parts of the member, this quartzite is also conglomeratic, containing granules and pebbles of quartz. There are also small amounts of dolomitic sandstone, dolomite, and siltstone.

==== "Lower Carbonate-bearing" Member ====
This member is the thinnest member of the six, only getting up to 177 ft (54 m) thick, but is poorly defined. As the name suggests, it is composed of carbonate layers. In one part of the member, there are very fine medium-gray crystalline laminated to thin-bedded dolomite rocks up to 8 ft (2.4 m) , alongside a 25 ft (7.6 m) unit of dolomite, sandstone and shale. In most other areas of the known member, there are light-gray, olive-gray and pale-yellowish-brown dolomite and sandy dolomite, including small amounts of quartzite, dolomitic sandstone, and siltstone, up to 100 ft (30 m) thick. It also contains light-medium-gray massive dolomite, also up to 100 ft (30 m) thick.

==== "Siltstone" Member ====
This member is up to 585 ft (178 m) thick, and as the name suggests, is primarily composed of siltstones, and sometimes either sandstone or quartzite. The siltstone is composed of fine to coarse silt, and is a moderate yellowish-brown, light-greenish-gray, or yellowish-gray. In some areas of the member, the siltstone has been metamorphosed, turning into a phyllitic siltstone or argillite. The siltstone is inter-stratified with pale to dark-yellowish-brown sandstone or quartzite, usually very fine grained and laminated to thin-bedded. There may also be tuffaceous rocks, although multiple studies have struggled to pin-point exactly what it is, possibly due to the rock being highly altered, or the amount of tuffaceous material is too low to be read.

==== "Upper Carbonate-bearing" Member ====
This member is up to 590 ft (180 m) thick, and is composed of dolomite, quartzite, and siltstone. The dolomite rocks are the distinctive feature of this member, being medium-gray, yellowish-gray or olive-gray on freshly revealed surfaces, weathering to a moderate-yellowish-brown or grayish-orange over time. It is aphanitic to very fine crystalline and is laminated to thin-bedded, and also contains irregular layers of gray chert in some areas. It also contains very fine to fine grains of quartz to dolomitic sandstone. As for the quartzite and sandstone layers of the member, they are yellowish-gray to pale-yellowish-brown, ranging from very fine to fine grained, rarely fine to medium grained, and laminated. The siltstone layers are greenish-gray to pale-yellowish-brown. All these layers are evenly proportioned in thickness at about 50 ft (15 m) at their thickest, although in some areas the dolomite layers can get as low as 10 ft (3.0 m).

==== Rainstorm Member ====
This member is the thicket member out of the six, getting up to 1,136 ft (346 m) thick, and is the most widespread, outcropping in the Death Valley Kingston Range area, the Spring Mountains, Nevada Test Site and the Desert Range, and is consistent in its rock types throughout its entire area. It itself is composed of three units, from bottom to top informally known as the "Siltstone Unit", "Carbonate Unit", and "Siltstone and Quartzite Unit", which consist of the following rocks:

- Siltstone Unit : This unit is the thinnest, getting up to only 100 ft (30 m) thick. It is dominated by greenish-gray, medium-gray, moderate-yellowish-gray and grayish-red fine to coarse textured siltstones. In some parts of this unit, there are also small amounts of very fined grained sandstones. In the middle to upper parts of the unit, there is also a distinctive grayish-orange oolite dolomite layer, known as the "Johnnie Oolite", between 6–12 ft (1.8–3.7 m) thick. This layer contains oolites, which range from 0.2–1 mm (0.0–0.0 in) in diameter, found within a very fine crystalline matrix. This layer is commonly found overlying a 10–45 ft (3.0–13.7 m) thick layer of purple fine textured sandstones or shales.
- Carbonate Unit : This unit is up to 250 ft (76 m) thick. It contains pale-red to grayish-red siltstone and limy siltstone, alongside pale-red limestones. All these are laminated to very thin-bedded, as well as ripple laminated. There are also ripple marks, possible flute casts and drag marks, most commonly found in on the siltstone layer, and is not known from any the formation within the Mojave Desert. In the southern areas of this unit, it is composed of dolomites instead of siltstones and limestones. These dolomites are very-pale-orange to grayish-orange very fine crystalline laminated and thin-bedded. Inter-stratified within these dolomite layers, there are also sandstones, quartzites, dolomitic sandstones and siltstones.
- Siltstone and Quartzite Unit : This unit is the thickest, getting up to 600 ft (180 m) thick in some areas. It is dominated by greenish-gray and light-olive-gray fine to coarse textured siltstones, as well as yellowish-gray and light-greenish-gray laminated to very thin-bedded very fine grained sandstones. There is also brown-weathering dolomites, getting up to 100 ft (30 m) thick. The top 200 ft (61 m) consist entirely of dolomite rocks.

== Paleobiota ==
The Johnnie Formation is mostly noted for containing microbial laminations, alongside Stromatolite structures.

== See also ==
- List of fossiliferous stratigraphic units in California
