= Wood Canyon Formation =

Geologic formation in the northern Mojave Desert

- Stratigraphic range: Ediacaran – Cambrian 540–532.83 Ma
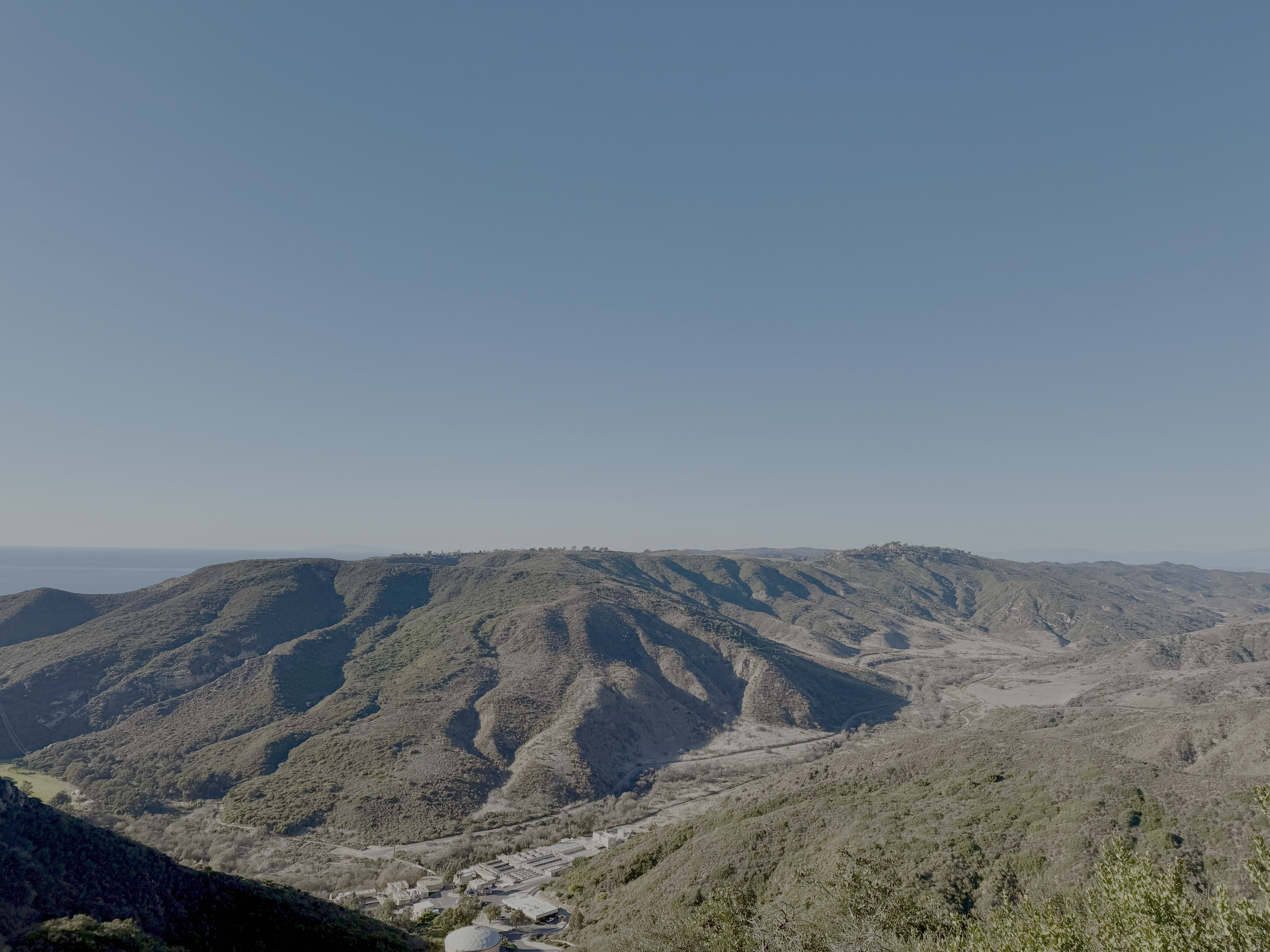
- A view of Wood Canyon from the south, the locality after which the formation is named.
- Type: Geologic formation
- Sub-units: 'Upper', 'Middle' and 'Lower' members
- Underlies: Zabriskie Quartzite
- Overlies: Stirling Quartzite
- Thickness: 0–4,000 feet (0–1,219 m)

Lithology
- Primary: Sandstone
- Other: Limestone, Siltstone, Quartzite, Shale, Dolostone, Conglomerate

Location
- Coordinates: 36.42°N 116.07°W
- Region: Mojave Desert, California and Nevada
- Country: United States

Type section
- Named for: Wood Canyon
- Wood Canyon Formation (Nevada)

The Wood Canyon Formation is a geologic formation in the northern Mojave Desert of Inyo County, California and Nye County and Clark County, Nevada.

It can be seen in the Panamint Range and Funeral Mountains adjoining Death Valley, within Death Valley National Park; and in the Spring Mountains in Clark County.

== Geology ==
The 570+ million years old formation underlies the Zabriskie Quartzite Formation, and overlies the Stirling Quartzite.

It has three unnamed members, simply known as 'Upper', 'Middle', and 'Lower', that mainly consist of limestone, conglomerate rocks and dolostone respectively, with sandstone and siltstones found within the 'Upper' and 'Lower' members, with the latter itself further containing quartzite and shales. The 'Upper' and 'Middle' members are Cambrian in age, including the upper rocks of the 'Lower' member, whilst the rest of the 'Lower' member is Ediacaran in age.

== Paleobiota ==
The Wood Canyon Formation spans from the late Ediacaran period of the Neoproterozoic Era into the Lower Cambrian Period of the Paleozoic Era. As for the fossils and biota found within the formation, the Cambrian strata is home to olenellid trilobites and archaeocyathid sponges, whilst the Ediacaran strata contains petalonamid forms like Pteridinium and ichnotaxon traces like Helminthoidichnites.

Color key
Taxon	Reclassified taxon	Taxon falsely reported as present	Dubious taxon or junior synonym	Ichnotaxon	Ootaxon	Morphotaxon

Notes
Uncertain or tentative taxa are in small text; ~~crossed out~~ taxa are discredited.

=== Cambrian ===
All the organisms and trace fossils from the Cambrian sections of the formation.

==== Arthropoda ====
Genus	Species	Notes	Images
Olenellidae indet.	Unapplicable	Redlichiid trilobite arthropods.	
Nevadia (?)	N. gracile (?)	Redlichiid trilobite arthropods, from the family Nevadiidae. Misslabelled as Nevadella gracile, tentative assignment. Some studies also note this to possibly be Judomia.	

==== Lophotrochozoa ====
Genus	Species	Notes	Images
Kutorgina (?)	Kutorgina sp. (?)	Rhynchonelliform brachiopods, tentative assignment.	
Hyolithes (?)	Hyolithes sp. (?)	Lophotrochozoan Hyolith, tentative assignment.	

==== Porifera (Sponges) ====
Genus	Species	Notes	Images
Cordilleracyathus (?)	Cordilleracyathus (?)sp.	Archeocyathid sponge.	
Archaeocyathus (?)	Archaeocyathus (?)sp.	Archeocyathid sponge.	

==== Echinodermata ====
Genus	Species	Notes	Images
Helicoplacus	H. gilberti	Oblong echinoderm.	

==== Petalonamae ====
Genus	Species	Notes	Images
Swartpuntia	S. germsi	Sessile frondose organism, although assignment has been questioned based on the possibility that known specimens could be referred to other known Cambrian frondose organisms.	

==== incertae sedis ====
Genus	Species	Notes	Images
Harlaniella	H. confusa	Ribbon-like organism.	
Tirasiana (?)	T. disciformis (?)	Discoidal organism, tentative assignment. Possibly junior synonym of Aspidella.	

==== Ichnogenera ====
Genus	Species	Notes	Images
Bergaueria	Bergaueria isp.	Resting place of Cnidarians.	
Conichnus	Conichnus isp.	Burrows.	
Cruziana	C. pectinata; C. tenella	Burrows.	
Dolopichnus	Dolopichnus isp.	Burrows.	
Didymaulichnus	D. miettensis	Burrows.	
Psammichnites	P. gigas	Burrows.	
Rusophycus	Rusophycus isp.	Burrows.	
Skolithos	S. linearis	Burrows.	
Treptichnus	T. pedum	Burrows.	
Zoophycos	Zoophycos isp.	Feeding trace of polychaete worms.	

=== Ediacaran ===
All the organisms and trace fossils from the Ediacaran sections of the formation.

==== Petalonamae ====
Genus	Species	Notes	Images
Charnia (?)	Charnia sp. (?)	Sessile frondose organism, tentative assignment.	
Ernietta	E. plateauensis	Sessile bag-like frondose organism. Reclassified as Tulaneia.	
Pteridinium	Pteridinium sp.	Frondose organism.	
Swartpuntia	S. germsi	Sessile frondose organism, assignment has been questioned due to poor preservation.	
Tulaneia	T. amabilia	Sessile bag-like frondose organism.	

==== incertae sedis ====
Genus	Species	Notes	Images
Archaeichnium	A. haughtoni	Tubular organism. A recent 2017 suggests reported specimens may instead be poorly preserved Gaojiashania specimens, although future studies do not note this.	
Costatubus	C. bibendi	Tubular fossil, first occurrence in this formation and new species. A study done in the same year discovered some of the first remains of cloudinomorph soft-tissue material within the tubes, resembling bilaterian-like through-guts, which would also make them the oldest known guts in the fossil record.	
Cloundina	Cloundina sp.	Tubular organism. A recent 2017 suggests reported specimens may instead be poorly preserved Gaojiashania specimens, although future studies do not note this.	
Conotubus	Conotubus sp.	Tubular organism.	
Corumbella	Corumbella sp.	Tubular organism.	
Gaojiashania	Gaojiashania sp.	Tubular organism.	
Saarina	S. hagadorni	Tubular fossil, first occurrence in this formation and new species. A study done in the same year discovered some of the first remains of cloudinomorph soft-tissue material within the tubes, resembling bilaterian-like through-guts, which would also make them the oldest known guts in the fossil record.	
Nimbia (?)	N. occlusa (?)	Discoid organism, tentative assignment.	
Onuphionella	Onuphionella sp.	Tubular organism, first known occurrence in Ediacaran aged rock. A recent 2017 suggests reported specimens may instead be poorly preserved Gaojiashania specimens, although future studies do not note this.	

==== Ichnogenera ====
Genus	Species	Notes	Images
Helminthoidichnites	Helminthoidichnites isp.	Burrows.	
Palaeophycus	Palaeophycus isp.	Burrows.	
Planolites	Planolites isp.	Burrows.	
Bilobate trails	???	Trails, bears similarities with the ichnogenus Scolicia.	

==== Undescribed ====
Genus	Species	Notes	Images
Conical calcareous fossils	Unapplicable	Calcareous fossils that are conical in shape, although their poor preservation hinders any proper assignments. They have been suggested to represent the well-known and common organism Cloudina, the small shelly fossil Wyattia, or even a new genus.	
Enigmatic tubular fossils	Unapplicable	Various pyritized tubular forms ranging from 0.3 to 7 cm in length and 1 to 5 mm in diameter.	

== See also ==
- List of fossiliferous stratigraphic units in California
- List of fossiliferous stratigraphic units in Nevada
- Paleontology in California
- Paleontology in Nevada
