= Stirling Quartzite =

Geologic formation in the Mojave Desert

- Stratigraphic range: Ediacaran
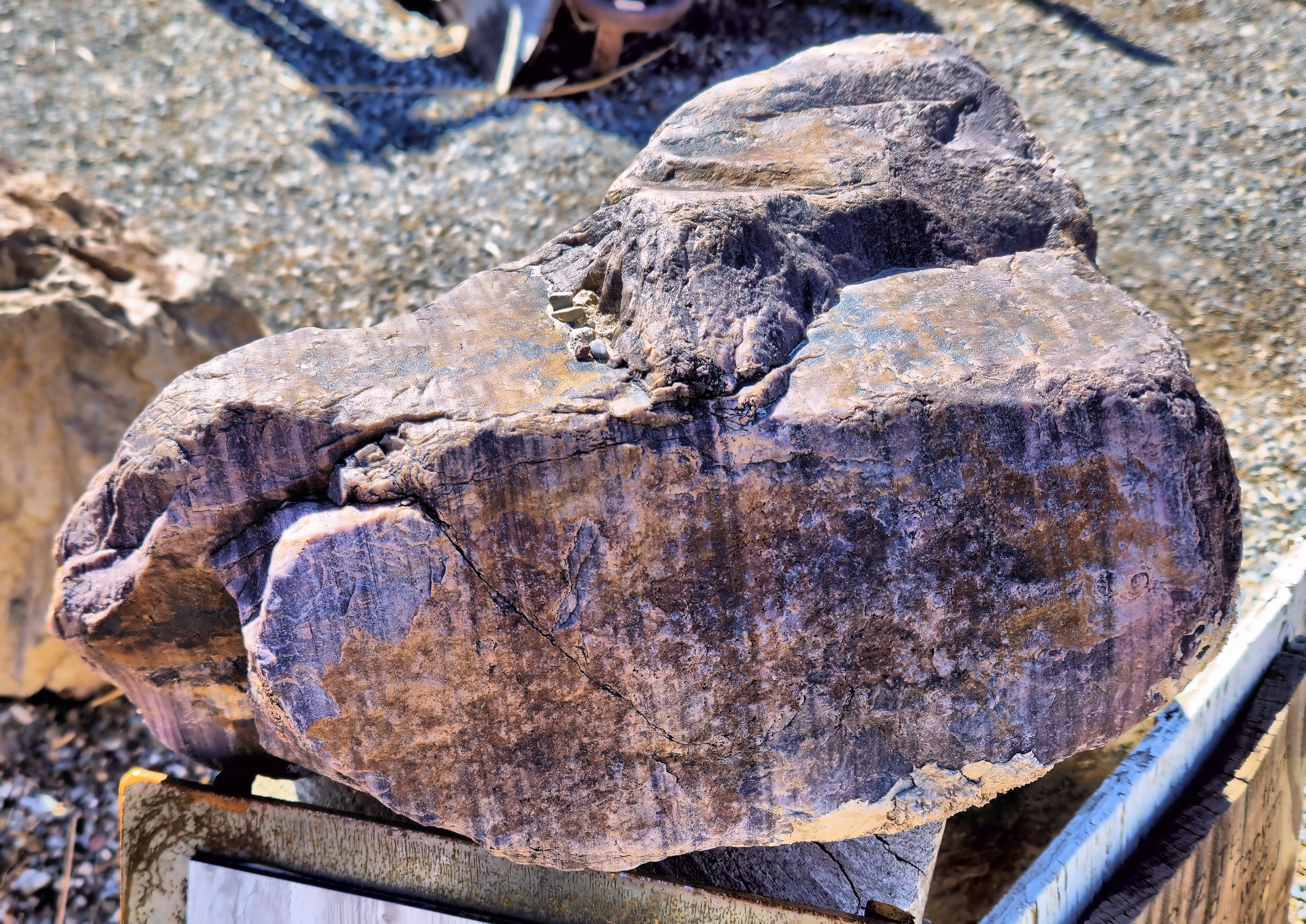
- Stirling quartzite from the Mojave desert.
- Type: Geologic formation
- Sub-units: "Upper", "Middle" and "Lower" Members
- Underlies: Wood Canyon Formation
- Overlies: Johnnie Formation
- Area: 40,000 km^{2} (15,000 sq mi)
- Thickness: 100–1,600 metres (330–5,250 ft)

Lithology
- Primary: Quartzite
- Other: Siltstone, Sandstone, Feldspars, Carbonate rock, Pebble Conglomerate

Location
- Region: Mojave Desert, California and Nevada
- Country: United States

The Stirling Quartzite is a geologic formation in the northern Mojave Desert of Inyo County, California and Nye County and Clark County, Nevada.

It can be seen in the Panamint Range and Funeral Mountains adjoining Death Valley within Death Valley National Park; and in the Spring Mountains in Clark County. It also preserves rare fossils dating back to the Ediacaran period of the Neoproterozoic Era.

== Geology ==
The formation underlies the Wood Canyon Formation and overlies the Johnnie Formation. The formation itself, as the name suggests, mainly consists of quartzite rocks, interbedded with varying sandstones, siltstones, carbonate rocks and occasional pebble conglomerates. It is also noted that the mineral feldspars appears throughout the formation, which are weather from rounded to sub-angular grains.

== Dating ==
Whilst most studies agree that the Stirling Quartzite is firmly Ediacaran in age due to the base of the overlying Wood Canyon Formation being aged at the latest Ediacaran and the lower strata of the Johnnie Formation having a recovered date of 640±0.09 Ma, the Stirling Quartzite has not been properly dated, excluding provenances within the formation.

Using detrital zircon geochronology on two zircon sample groups, NR9 and NR30, collected from the aforementioned provenances within the Upper and Lower members of the Stirling Quartzite respectively. The age range recovered for the NR9 samples was between 2729±0 Ma and 573±0 Ma, whilst the age range recovered for the NR30 samples was between 2754±0 Ma and 927±0 Ma.

== Paleobiota ==
The Stirling Quartzite is home to very few and rare Ediacaran fossils, with assignments to all fossils found within being tentative at best.

Color key: Taxon / Reclassified taxon / Taxon falsely reported as present / Dubious taxon or junior synonym / Ichnotaxon / Ootaxon / Morphotaxon

Notes
Uncertain or tentative taxa are in small text
~~crossed out~~ taxa are discredited.

=== incertae sedis ===
Genus	Species	Notes	Images
Cloudina	Cloudina sp.	Tubular organism, tentative assignment.	
Nimbia	N. occlusa	Discoidal organism, tentative assignment.	

==== Ichnogenera ====
Genus	Species	Notes	Images
Planolites	Planolites isp.	Burrows, occur right at the top of the "Upper Member".	

== See also ==
- List of fossiliferous stratigraphic units in California
- List of fossiliferous stratigraphic units in Nevada
