= Daggett, California =

Unincorporated town in California, United States

- Unincorporated town
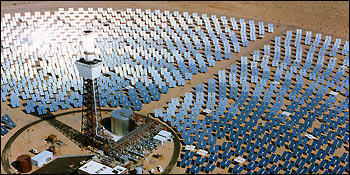
- Solar Two experimental solar power plant

- Location within the State of California Daggett, California (the United States)
- Coordinates: 34°51′48″N 116°53′17″W
- Country: United States
- State: California
- County: San Bernardino
- Founded: 1883
- Elevation: 2,014 ft (614 m)

Population (2000)
  - Total: 200
- Time zone: UTC-8 (Pacific (PST))
  - Summer (DST): UTC-7 (PDT)
- ZIP codes: 92327
- Area codes: 442/760
- FIPS code: 06-17778
- GNIS feature ID: 241219

Daggett is an unincorporated town located in San Bernardino County, California, in the United States. The town is located on Interstate 40, ten miles (16 km) east of Barstow, at an elevation of approximately 2,000 feet (610 m). The town has a population of about 200. The ZIP code is 92327 and the community is inside area code 760.

== History ==
The town was founded in the 1880s just after the discovery of silver in the mines near Calico to the north. In 1882, the Southern Pacific Railroad with the Atlantic & Pacific Railroad (Later Atchison, Topeka and Santa Fe Railway, BNSF) from Mojave was being completed in the area and it was thought that a good name for the town would be Calico Junction. It was decided to name the city after then Lieutenant Governor of California, John Daggett during the spring of 1883. There were plans to make Daggett the main station of the area and to have a rail yard there to handle the heavy trains coming from the East, but due to the silver mining making the prices of land go too high, the ATSF moved to Barstow and established the main rail station there. In 1903, the San Pedro, Los Angeles & Salt Lake Railroad (later Union Pacific Railroad) also built their line from Las Vegas through Daggett to reach Los Angeles and East San Pedro by borrowing trackage of the ATSF through to Barstow to allow the servicing of their engines at the roundhouse located there.

Borax was also important to Daggett's economy and the town's history. For two years, it was the terminal of the Twenty-mule team run from Death Valley, but after one of their swampers, William Pitt, was lynched, the Pacific Borax Company changed the terminal to Mojave. Later on in 1891, Francis Marion Smith the 'Borax King' moved to Daggett from Death Valley's Harmony Borax Works to install mining operations at a borax mine called Borate, which was located about three miles east of Calico. This operation required many laborers to come and help, it was reported that Pacific Coast Borax Company employed nearly 200 men to work in the mines. At first, the borax was hauled by the 20 Mule Team, but Smith sought to replace the mules with a cheaper, efficient means of transportation. The Borate and Daggett Railroad was built in 1898 to take over the duty of hauling borax from the mules.

In the 1890s, there were three stores, two restaurants, three saloons, three hotels, a lumberyard, and a Chinese eating place. But after 1911 when richer borax deposits were discovered north of Daggett in Death Valley at the Lila C. Mines, all the mining operations were moved there, which caused Daggett to go into a steady decline which continues even to this day. Despite the establishment of the solar energy plants, Daggett still struggles to hang on to life. However, there are still some people who travel through the town to reach Yermo, California and Las Vegas today.

== Airport ==
Daggett is close to the location of Barstow-Daggett Airport. The facility is a general aviation airport serving the Barstow area. It is also the regional weather information center. The airport was built as a modification center for the Douglas A-20 Havoc bomber aircraft that were sent to Russia as part of the Lend-Lease program during World War II.

== Education ==
Daggett is part of the Silver Valley Unified School District.

Silver Valley High School is located at 35484 Daggett-Yermo Road.

== Government ==
Parks, Water, and firefighting services are provided by Daggett Community Services District

== Demographics ==
As of 2003, 1,000 people lived in and around Daggett, though nearly 1,500 live in the surrounding area. Only about 200 people live in the town.

== Infrastructure ==
The world's first commercial solar power plants, SEGS I (built in 1984) and SEGS II (built in 1985) of the SEGS network were located in Daggett.

Daggett was also home to a unique solar thermal energy plant named Solar One, a pilot project which was operational from 1982 to 1986. The plant used mirror-like heliostats to aim sunlight at a collecting cylinder located on a solar power tower (a type of solar furnace), through which oil flowed. The large quantity of sunlight reflected on the sphere superheated the oil, which was then used to create steam for power generation. The plant was upgraded in 1995 as part of the Solar Two project. Solar Two substituted molten salt compounds instead of oil as an energy storage medium.

During calibration of the power plant's thousands of heliostats, a ball of glowing light was sometimes seen in the nearby area. This effect was caused by the heliostats focusing sunlight onto a specific point. As the intensity of the light increased, it reflected off dust in the desert air. This phenomenon was sometimes seen by passersby on nearby Interstate 40 and 15.

Solar Two was decommissioned in 1999, and the facility was converted in 2001 into a gamma-ray astronomy telescope. The facility is now known as CACTUS (Converted Atmospheric Cherenkov Telescope Using Solar-2). CACTUS, which is operated by the University of California, Davis but owned by Southern California Edison, operated from late 2004 until late 2005.

On November 25, 2009, the Solar Two tower was demolished. The site was leveled by Southern California Edison. All heliostats and other hardware were removed. Plans are in place to develop a training facility for Southern California Edison to train personnel on construction and maintenance of high power transmission lines and towers.

At the Coolwater Generating Station (600 MW natural gas, decommissioned in 2015), a 482 MW photovoltaic power station with 394 MW of battery began construction in October 2021.

== Transportation ==
Daggett is a station on the BNSF Railway on the Needles Subdivision. Trains are frequent on the line as this line goes to Chicago. It is also a junction of the Cima subdivision of the Union Pacific Railroad, the former Los Angeles and Salt Lake Railroad, line from Salt Lake City, Utah via Las Vegas, Nevada. The Union Pacific runs via trackage rights on the BNSF and goes to Riverside, California.

Back in its heyday, Daggett had two narrow gauge railroads, the Borate and Daggett Railroad and the Waterloo Mining Railroad, both built to export silver and borax ore out of the Calico Mountains several miles north. Both were 3 ft gauge, and both were serviced by two steam locomotives each. After 1907, both of these railroads were closed down and abandoned due to the mining companies moving to the north in Death Valley. The old railroad beds can still be traced in some places in the desert, but now most of the old grades have been paved over to support cars and off-road vehicles.

== Cemetery ==
The Daggett Cemetery, which features graves dating back to the early 1900s, is located at 34°51′31″N 116°52′48″W.

== In popular culture ==
Daggett appears in The Cardigans' video for "My Favourite Game". The 1940 movie The Grapes of Wrath used Daggett as a filming location.

== Climate ==
According to the Köppen Climate Classification system, Daggett has a semi-arid climate, abbreviated "BSk" on climate maps. There is very little rainfall year-round and diurnal temperature variation is high. In the winter, nights are often very cold while days are mildly cool. Meanwhile, summer nights are mildly warm while days can be extremely hot.

Climate data for Barstow-Daggett Airport, California (1981-2010)
Month	Jan	Feb	Mar	Apr	May	Jun	Jul	Aug	Sep	Oct	Nov	Dec	Year
Mean daily maximum °F (°C)	60.7 (15.9)	64.7 (18.2)	71.6 (22.0)	78.9 (26.1)	88.8 (31.6)	98.3 (36.8)	104.2 (40.1)	102.6 (39.2)	94.9 (34.9)	82.4 (28.0)	69.0 (20.6)	59.5 (15.3)	81.4 (27.4)
Daily mean °F (°C)	48.4 (9.1)	52.3 (11.3)	58.3 (14.6)	64.8 (18.2)	74.0 (23.3)	82.6 (28.1)	88.8 (31.6)	87.4 (30.8)	80.1 (26.7)	68.3 (20.2)	55.7 (13.2)	47.2 (8.4)	67.4 (19.7)
Mean daily minimum °F (°C)	36.0 (2.2)	39.8 (4.3)	45.0 (7.2)	50.7 (10.4)	59.3 (15.2)	67.0 (19.4)	73.3 (22.9)	72.2 (22.3)	65.3 (18.5)	54.2 (12.3)	42.4 (5.8)	34.8 (1.6)	53.4 (11.9)
Average precipitation inches (mm)	0.60 (15)	0.66 (17)	0.50 (13)	0.17 (4.3)	0.05 (1.3)	0.06 (1.5)	0.46 (12)	0.26 (6.6)	0.21 (5.3)	0.18 (4.6)	0.34 (8.6)	0.57 (14)	4.06 (103)
Source: Western Regional Climate Center
