= Smith Mountain (Death Valley) =

Mountain in the American state of California

- Location within California Location within the United States

Highest point
- Elevation: 5,915 ft (1,803 m) NAVD 88
- Prominence: 1,593 ft (486 m)
- Listing: Desert Peaks Section List
- Coordinates: 36°01′05″N 116°41′21″W

Geography
- Location: Death Valley National Park, Inyo County, California, U.S.
- Parent range: Black Mountains,
- Topo map(s): USGS, Gold Valley, CA

Climbing
- Easiest route: Cross country hike class 1

Smith Mountain, 5,915 feet (1,803 m), is a peak in the Black Mountains of the Amargosa Range in Death Valley National Park in California.

It is named after Francis Marion "Borax" Smith, of the local Pacific Coast Borax Company enterprise.

== See also ==
- 20 Mule Team Borax
- Harmony Borax Works
- Francis Marion Smith
- Death Valley Railroad
