= Borate and Daggett Railroad =

Railroad in California

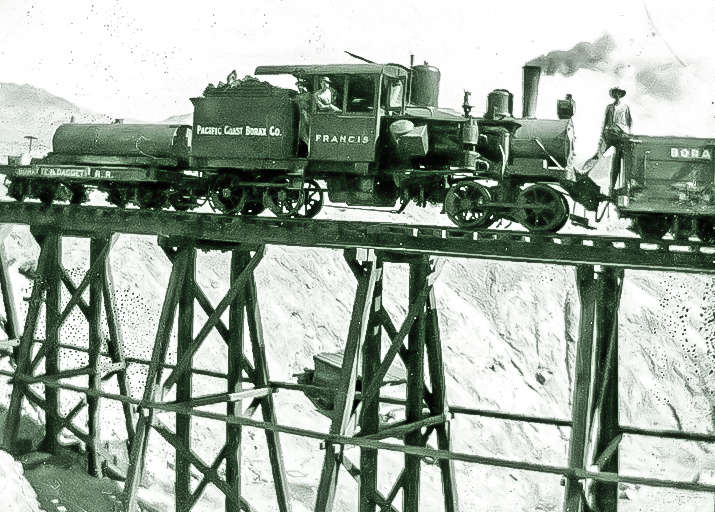
- Borate & Daggett Railroad train on high trestle just before Borate, engine is #2 "Francis"

Overview
- Headquarters: Daggett, California
- Locale: Daggett, California to Borate, California
- Dates of operation: 1898–1907

Technical
- Track gauge: 3 ft (914 mm)

The Borate and Daggett Railroad was a 3 ft (914 mm) narrow gauge railroad built to carry borax in the Mojave Desert. The railroad ran about 11 miles (18 km) from Daggett, California, US, to the mining camp of Borate, three miles (4.8 km) to the east of Calico.

== History ==
In 1883, prospectors discovered a rich vein of colemanite borax in the Calico Mountains 4 miles east from the silver mining town of Calico. The claim was bought by mining tycoon William Tell Coleman, who owned and worked several borax mines in Death Valley, including the Harmony Borax Works, famous for the Twenty-mule teams which were used to haul borax to the railroads at Mojave, California. In 1888, Coleman suffered financial reverses and sold his properties to Francis Marion Smith, who combined his holdings into the Pacific Coast Borax Company in 1890. Smith was interested in using the borax deposits at Calico, now called "Borate," as his new company's main source of income. By 1899, Borate had become the largest borax mine in the world, outputting 22,000 short tons (19,643 long tons; 19,958 t) of borate out of over a dozen shafts at the mine.

At first, twenty-mule teams had been used to haul the borax to the railhead at Daggett, California, but Smith was not happy with the cost and upkeep with the mules and wagons, and in 1894, made efforts to replace them with a Daniel Best steam tractor (now called "Old Dinah") which was not well equipped for running in the desert. After two years, "Dinah" was retired and Smith set to construct a narrow-gauge railroad between Borate and Daggett. The railroad was completed in 1898, and used two Heisler steam locomotives named "Marion" and "Francis" after Francis Marion Smith himself, to haul the ore. They also built a roasting mill on the halfway point on the railroad, also named "Marion" for Francis Marion Smith. Here the little engines brought the ore to be roasted and loaded into burlap bags. A 3rd rail was built to the mill to accommodate bringing standard gauge boxcars to the mill, so little time can be wasted transferring the borax between the narrow-gauge and standard gauge railroads.

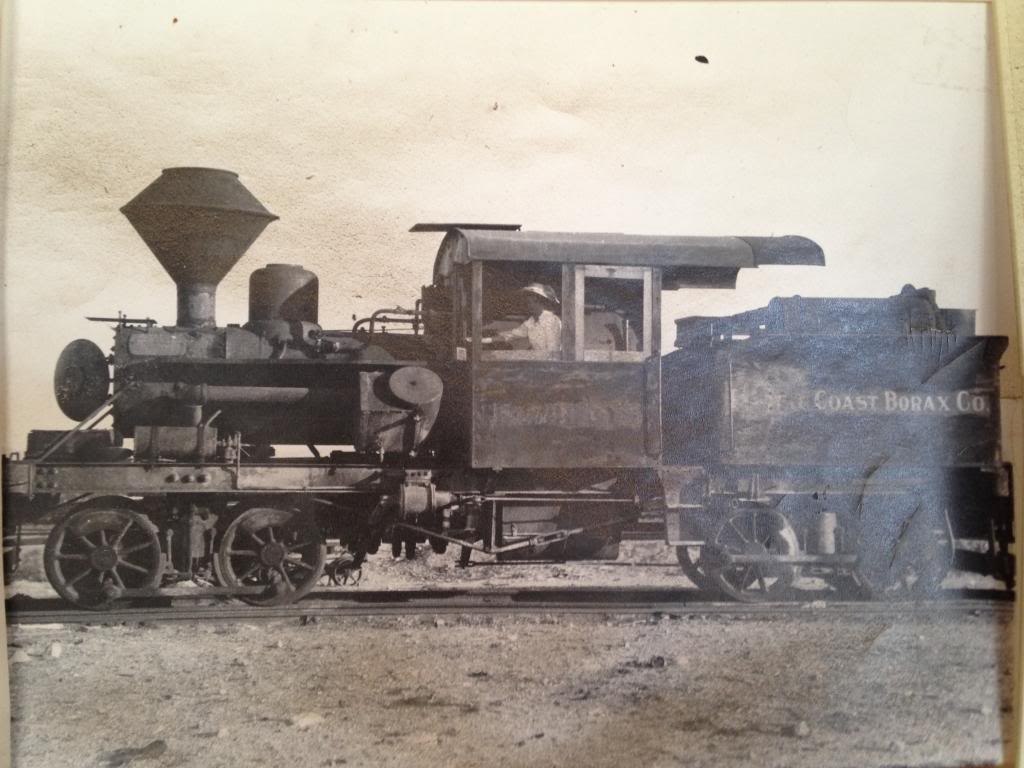
Borate & Daggett Heisler locomotive #1 "Marion" (s/n 1018), at Daggett, California in 1910. It went on to work for the Forest Lumber Company in Oregon until the lumber mill at Pine Ridge burned to the ground in 1939.

By 1904, the decline in quality of the borate ore was beginning to show, and Smith immediately set his sights to Death Valley to find a successor for borate. He soon located the Lila C. Mine, which was over 142 miles (229 km) north of Daggett, and ordered the construction of the Tonopah and Tidewater Railroad to export the ore from the Lila C. to the nearest rail connection at Ludlow, California. As soon as the T&T reached the Lila C. in October 1907, all mining operations at Borate were ceased and the Borate & Daggett Railroad abandoned. Most of the rails were taken up and sold for scrap, and the two locomotives along with the rolling stock were left behind on a little siding in Daggett adjacent to the Santa Fe mainline. They would not see use again until 1913, when Pacific Coast Borax required narrow-gauge railway equipment to help construct the Death Valley Railroad. When completed, the old and tired Heisler locomotives lived out their days with their predecessors in the timber fields of Oregon and northern California.

Borate & Daggett Heisler locomotive #2 "Francis" (s/n 1026), at Daggett, California in 1910. The locomotive helped to construct the Death Valley Railroad in 1913, before being sold to the Nevada Short Line Railway in 1916 where it retained its number #2. It ended its days working for the Terry Lumber Company (later Red River) at Round Mountain, California until about 1925.

== See also ==
- United States Potash Railroad
- Waterloo Mining Railroad
