= Twenty-mule team =

Transport of borax across Death Valley

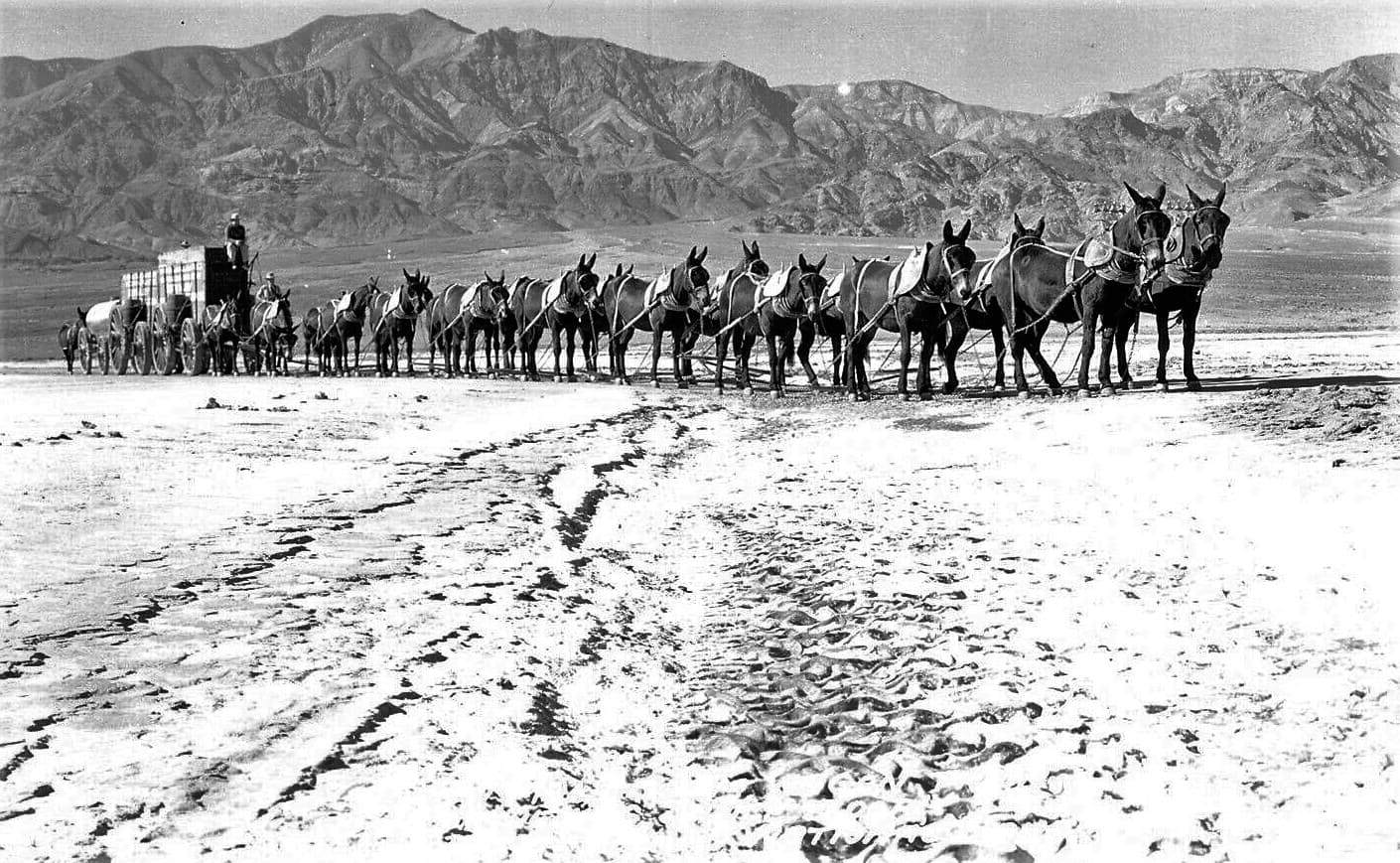
Twenty-mule team in Death Valley, California

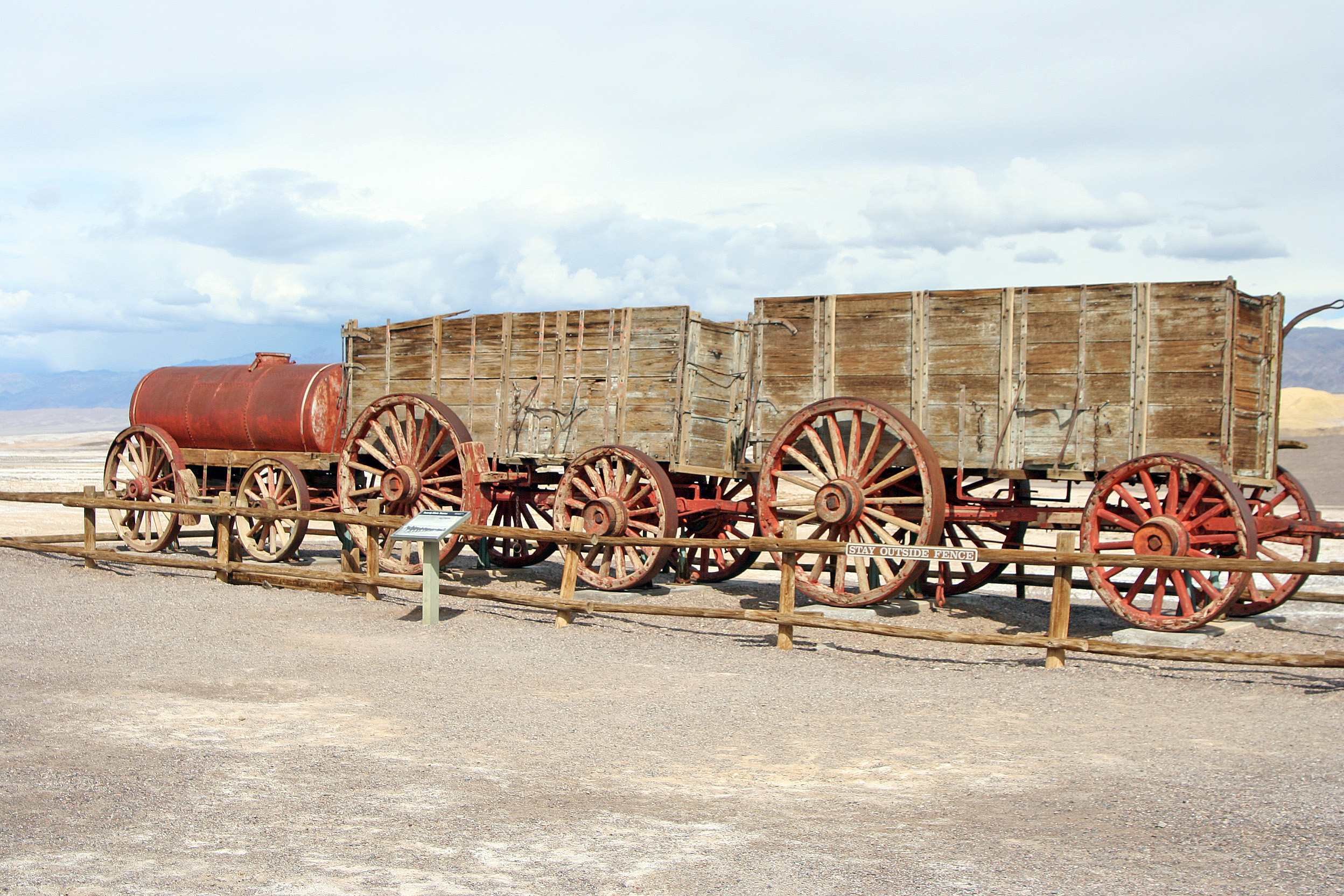
Twenty-mule-team wagons on display in Death Valley, California

Twenty-mule teams were teams of eighteen mules and two horses attached to large wagons that transported borax out of Death Valley from 1883 to 1898. They traveled from mines across the Mojave Desert to the nearest railroad spur, 165 miles (266 km) away in Mojave. The routes were from the Harmony and Amargosa Borax Works to Daggett, California, and later Mojave, California. After Harmony and Amargosa shut down in 1888, the mule team's route was moved to the mines at Borate, 3 miles (5 km) east of Calico, back to Daggett. There they worked from 1891 until 1898 when they were replaced by the Borate and Daggett Railroad.

The wagons were among the largest ever pulled by draft animals, designed to carry 10 short tons (9 metric tons) of borax ore at a time.

== History ==
In 1877, six years before twenty-mule teams would be introduced in Death Valley, Scientific American reported that Francis Marion Smith and his brother had shipped their company's borax in a 30-ton load using two large wagons, with a third wagon for food and water, drawn by a 24-mule team over a 160-mile (260 km) stretch of desert between Columbus, Nevada and Wadsworth, Nevada.

The teams hauled more than 20 million pounds (9,100 t) of borax out of Death Valley in the six years of operation, with Pacific Coast Borax shipping their borax by train starting in 1898.

== Mules ==
All were mules except for the two closest to the wagon—the wheelers—which were horses. The wheelers were ridden by one of the two men generally required to operate the wagons and were typically larger than their mule brethren. They had great brute strength for starting the wagons moving and could withstand the jarring of the heavy wagon tongue, but the mules were smarter and better suited to work in desert conditions. In the Proceedings Fifth Death Valley Conference on History and Prehistory, two articles discussed freight operations in the Mojave with specific details on the use of mules and horses. In "Of Myths and Men: Separating Fact from Fiction in the Twenty Mule Team Story", author Ted Fave discussed how the teams were assembled, trained, and used. "Nadeau's Freighting Teams in the Mojave", based on Remi Nadeau's historic accomplishments hauling freight throughout the desert region, gives further insight as to the superiority of mules for general use.

The teamster drove the team with a single long rein, known as a "jerk line", and the aid of a long blacksnake whip. The teamster usually rode the left wheeler, but he could also drive from the trailer seat, working the brake on steep descents. The swamper usually rode the trailer, but in hilly country, he would be on the back action available to work the brake. From the trailer, armed with a can of small rocks, he could pelt an inattentive mule and send it back to work. Both men were responsible for readying the team, feeding and watering of the mules, and any veterinary care or repairs that needed to be done. There was a mid-day stop to feed and water the mules in harness. The night stops had corrals and feed boxes for the mules. A day's travel averaged about 17 miles (27 km), varying slightly from leg to leg. It took about ten days to make a trip one way. Cabins were constructed by the company for use of drivers and swampers at the night stops.

== Wagons ==
The vehicles

The carriage assembly

The twenty-mule-team wagons were designed to carry 10 short tons (9.1 tonnes) of borax ore at a time. The rear wheels were seven feet (2.1 m) high, and fitted with 1-inch-thick (25 mm) iron tires. The solid oak wagon beds measured 16 feet (4.9 m) long by 6 feet (1.8 m) deep, and weighed 7,800 pounds (3,500 kg) empty. Due to their rugged construction, none ever broke down in transit. The first wagon was the trailer, the second was "the tender" or the "back action", and the tank wagon containing water brought up the rear. With the mules, the caravan stretched over 180 feet (55 m). When loaded with ore the total weight of the mule train, wagons and all, was 73,200 pounds (33,200 kg; 36.6 short tons).

The water tank held 1,200 US gallons (4,500 L), and supplied the mules with water en route. There were water barrels on the wagons for the teamster and the swamper. Water supplies were refilled at springs along the way, as it was not possible to carry enough water for the entire trip. Feed and water for the return trip were dispersed at camps along the road by outbound teams from Mojave pulling empty borax wagons. At one point on the route an additional 500-US-gallon (1,900 L) wagon was added to the outbound train to take water to a dry camp, which was used by a return team and the cycle repeated.

== Promotion and fame ==
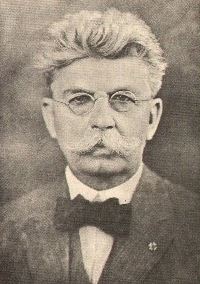
"Borax Smith", borax magnate and promoter of the "twenty-mule team"

Francis Marion Smith, who came to be known as "Borax Smith", founded Pacific Borax, the manufacturers of 20 Mule Team Borax. Cora Keagle recounted his history in an article, "Buckboard Days in Borate", published in Desert Magazine in September 1939. Smith was a great promoter and sent drivers out with jerk-line teams to major U.S. cities to promote the company's laundry product with free samples. The exhibition teams were typically mules for the promotion value, but Smith explained that in actual use, wheel horses were a standard practice. Outside contractors hauling for the company typically used mixed teams.

Joe Zentner wrote of the origins of the advertising campaign on the Desert USA website in "Twenty Mule Teams on the move in Death Valley". Bill Parkinson, formerly a night watchman for the company, had to learn quickly how to drive the team when he was given the role of "Borax Bill". He was the first, but not the last, driver known by that name. The 1904 St. Louis World's Fair was the maiden appearance for the team and was such a success that Parkinson went on tour.

The team eventually made its way to New York City, parading down Broadway. After that showing, the mules were sold, and the wagons shipped back to California. The mules also appeared at the Golden Gate Bridge dedication, according to The Last Ride, the Borax Twenty Mule Team 1883–1999..

A short item in the June 1940 edition of Desert Magazine mentioned that two of the original borax wagons were en route to the New York World's Fair. The item followed with the note that muleskinner "Borax Bill" Parkinson had driven an original wagon from Oakland, California, to New York City in 1917, spending two years on the journey. The mule team also made periodic re-enactment appearances on hauls into Death Valley.

In 1958, a twenty-mule team made a symbolic haul out of the new pit at U.S. Borax, commemorating the transition from underground to open-pit mining. Other appearances for twenty-mule teams included President Wilson's inauguration in 1917.

Promotional team appearances ended with an outing in the January 1, 1999, Rose Parade. The team had a shakedown outing in a 1998 Boron, California, parade. The company spent $100,000, refitting the 115-year-old wagons and obtaining harnesses and mules for the performance. There were no plans for additional public appearances for advertising purposes, as the company no longer had a retail product line.

U.S. Borax put out a paperback publication titled The Last Ride, the Borax Twenty Mule Team 1883–1999 that included many details about the history of the team and the preparation for the Rose Parade outing. There is a photo of Borax Bill driving the team down Broadway in New York City with bells on every animal. Most of the time, only the leaders wore bells. Another picture shows the team in San Francisco in 1917. This picture clearly shows the teamster on a horse. Another historic picture shows a working borax freight team with a mix of horses and mules.

A road that somewhat follows the route of the twenty-mule teams through California City, California is named Twenty Mule Team Parkway. The main street in Boron, California, a former alignment of California State Route 58, is named Twenty Mule Team Road.

== California Historical Landmark ==
20 Mule Team Terminus
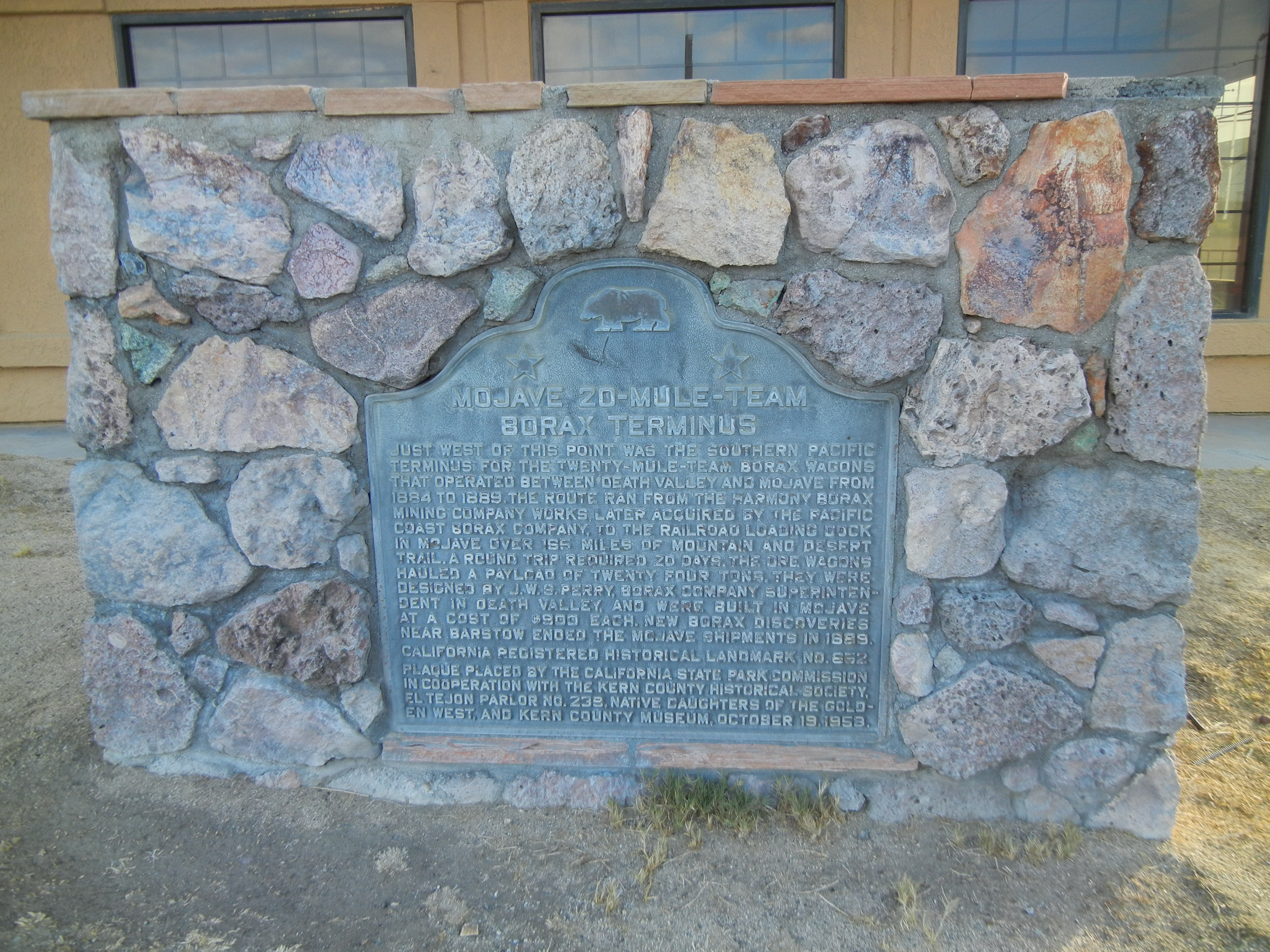
- 20 Mule Team Terminus: Sign in Mojave, CA
- Location: 16246 Sierra Highway, Mojave, California
- Coordinates: 35°03′25″N 118°10′30″W

California Historical Landmark
- Official name: Mule Team Borax Terminus
- Designated: July 1, 1958
- Reference no.: 778

The Mule Team Borax Terminus is a California Historical Landmark number 652. Mule Team Borax Terminus was located at what is now 16246 Sierra Highway, Mojave, California. California Historical Landmark status was given on July 1, 1958. A Twenty-mule team was used to haul the ore.

The California State Historical Landmark reads:

Just west of this point was the Southern Pacific terminus for the 20-mule-team borax wagons that operated between Death Valley and Mojave from 1884 to 1889. The route ran from the Harmony Borax Mining Company works, later acquired by the Pacific Coast Borax Company, to the railroad loading dock in Mojave over 165 miles of mountain and desert trail. A round trip required 20 days. The ore wagons, which hauled a payload of 24 tons, were designed by J. W. S. Perry, Borax Company superintendent in Death Valley, and built in Mojave at a cost of $900 each. New borax discoveries near Barstow ended the Mojave shipments in 1889.
