= Ryan, California =

Unincorporated community in California, United States

Ryan Ryan Camp
- Unincorporated community
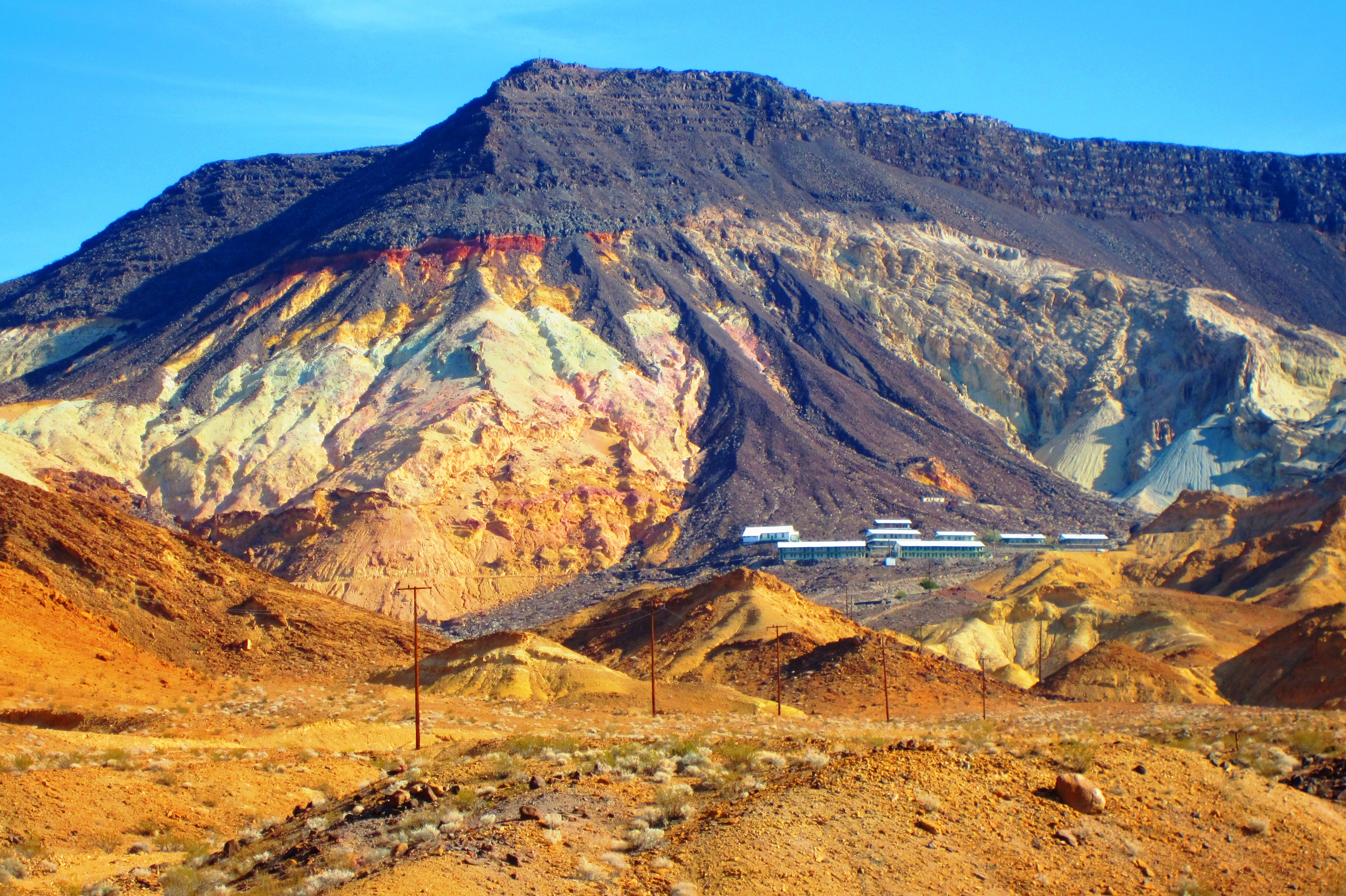
- View of Ryan, California from Death Valley National Park, at the junction of Furnace Creek Road and Ryan Road

- Location in California
- Coordinates: 36°19′23″N 116°40′17″W
- Country: United States
- State: California
- County: Inyo
- Elevation: 3,045 ft (928 m)
- Website: www.dvconservancy.org/ryan-california/

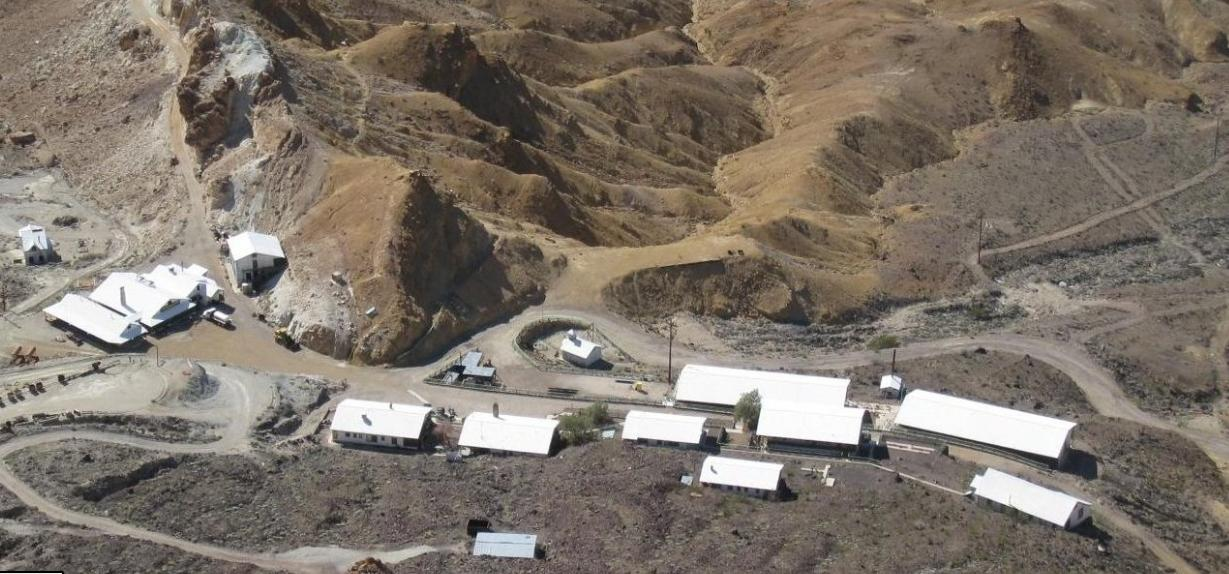
View of Ryan, CA from above that includes many of the surviving buildings

Ryan (also known as Ryan Camp) is an unincorporated community in Inyo County, California, United States that is now privately owned and stewarded by the Death Valley Conservancy. A former mining community, company town, and seasonal hotel, it is now under careful restoration and preservation. Ryan is situated at an elevation of 3,045 feet (928 m) in the Amargosa Range, and is 8 miles (13 km) northeast of Dante's View and 15 miles (24 km) southeast of Furnace Creek. The Ryan Historic District was listed on the National Register of Historic Places in 2025.

== Etymology ==
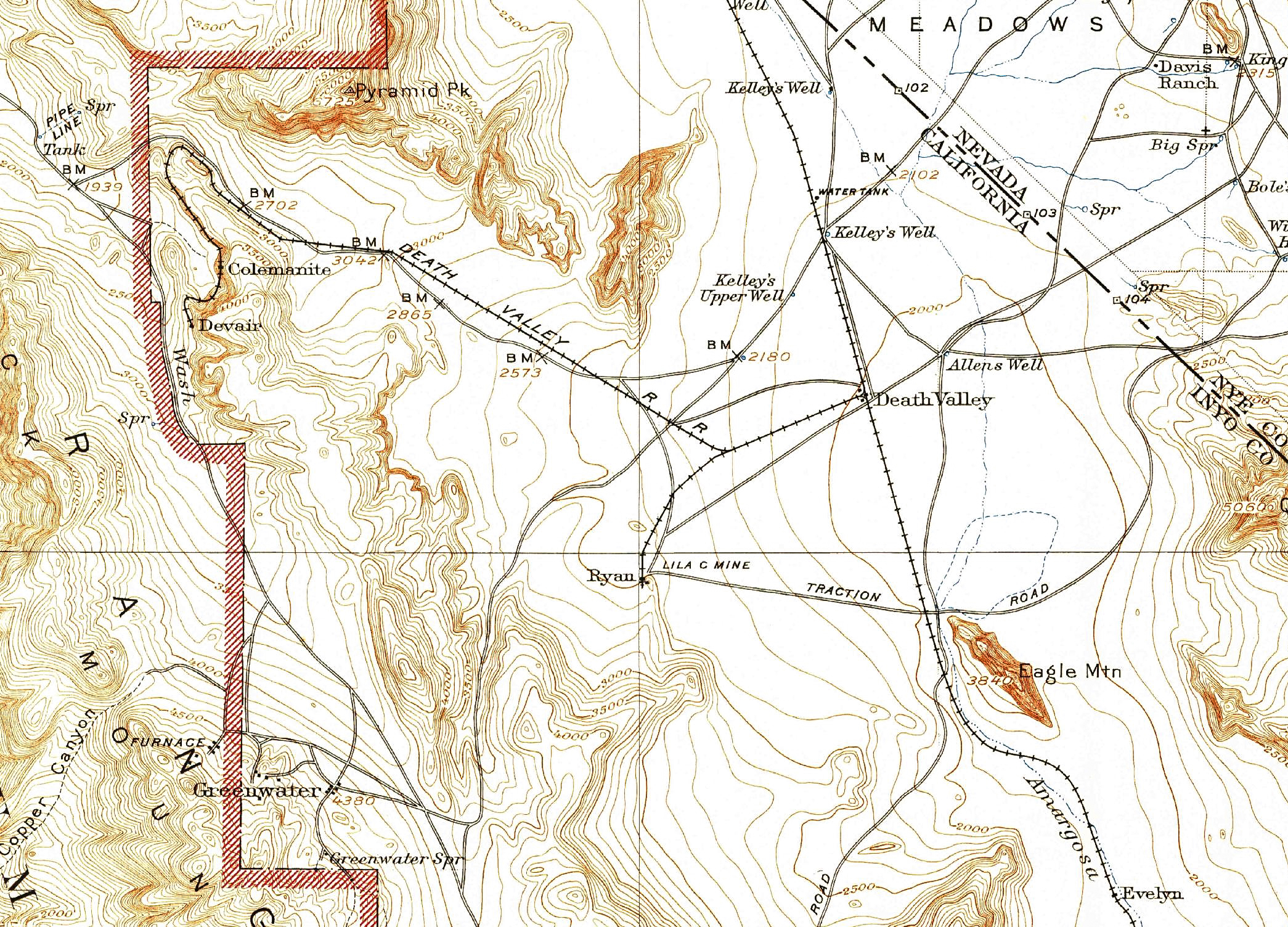
Detail from a 1930 USGS map of the Death Valley Railroad running from Death Valley Junction to the Lila C mine and New Ryan (depicted as Devair on this map)

The mining community of Lila C was constructed in 1907 near the Lila C mine, which produced colemanite for the Pacific Coast Borax Company. The town was named by its owner William Tell Coleman, after his daughter, Lila C. Coleman. Soon after its completion, the community of Lila C became known as "Ryan", in honor of John Ryan (1849–1918), who was General Manager of the Pacific Coast Borax Company and a trusted employee of "Borax" Smith until his death in 1918. The Ryan post office was opened at Lila C in 1907.

When a new mining camp was first constructed 11 miles (18 km) to the northwest of Lila C in 1914, the new settlement was named Devar (misspelled as Devair on a 1930 topographic map), an acronym for DEath VAlley Railroad. The name was later changed to Ryan in honor of John Ryan and the old camp at the Lila C. The new camp is currently known as Ryan, CA or Ryan Camp.

== History ==
Ryan was the western terminus for the Death Valley Railroad, the eastern terminus of which was located at Death Valley Junction near the borax works of the Pacific Coast Borax Company in the early 20th century.

According to the Death Valley Conservancy, "Ryan was a luxurious mining camp by any standards of the day – with electricity, steam heat and refrigeration it also boasted a school, a hospital, post office, recreation hall/church (shipped down in sections from Rhyolite) and a general store."

After borax production had stopped in 1928, in an effort to increase revenues on the Tonopah and Tidewater Railroad which had carried the borax ore, Pacific Coast Borax converted the miners' lodgings into tourist accommodations and gave tourists visiting Death Valley trips on the narrow gauge rail line into the mine. The Death Valley View Hotel operated full-time from 1927 until 1930, the year the Death Valley Railroad ceased to function. After 1930 the hotel was used as overflow accommodations for the Furnace Creek Ranch and Inn through the 1950s.

The Death Valley Conservancy is the current caretaker of Ryan Camp. The donation of Ryan Camp to the Death Valley Conservancy was completed by Rio Tinto Borax Corporation on May 6, 2013. The Death Valley Conservancy is a nonprofit charity led by the former Rio Tinto Chief Executive of Energy & Minerals, Preston Chiaro, as the DVC's president.

== Historic District ==
The Ryan Historic District was listed on the National Register of Historic Places in 2025. The historic district includes Ryan, remnants of the Death Valley Railroad and the Baby Gauge Railroad, the Upper and Lower Biddy mine complexes, road, and trails.

The district was recognized as significant under National Register Criterion A due to its connections to the early 20th-century borax mining industry in Death Valley, the rise of Death Valley tourism, 1950s film, and Cold War-era civil defense programs. Additionally, it qualified under Criterion C for its distinctive yet unified representation of early 20th-century Pacific Coast Borax corporate vernacular-style architecture and innovative engineering. Lastly, it met Criterion D for archaeology.

== Tours ==
While Ryan is closed to the general public for safety and historic preservation reasons, the Death Valley Conservancy offers occasional public tours. Tour participants can be selected by signing up on the Death Valley Conservancy's Ryan Tours webpage.

== Climate ==
This area has a large amount of sunshine year round due to its stable descending air and high pressure. According to the Köppen climate classification system, Ryan has a desert climate, abbreviated "Bwh" on climate maps.
