= Lila C, California =

Lila C
- Ghost town
- Location in California Lila C (the United States)
- Coordinates: 36°14′36″N 116°29′56″W
- Country: United States
- State: California
- County: Inyo
- Elevation: 2,562 ft (781 m)

Lila C (also known as Ryan or Old Ryan) is a former settlement in Inyo County, California, United States. It was located 6.25 miles (10 km) southwest of Death Valley Junction, at an elevation of 2562 feet (781 m).

== Borax Company ==
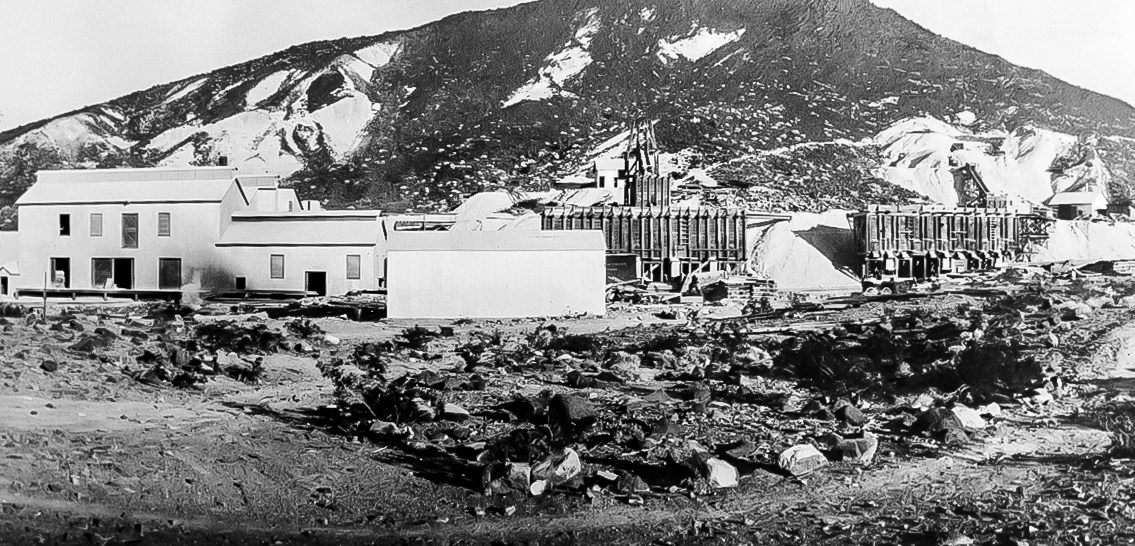
Lila C mine 1910

The settlement was connected by rail to the Lila C mine, which produced Colemanite for the Pacific Coast Borax Company, from which it got its name. The property was named by its owner William Tell Coleman, for his daughter, Lila C. Coleman. Francis Marion Smith subsequently obtained the property and started the first borax operations there in 1906. Production began several months before the Tonopah and Tidewater Railroad had reached the mine, and mule teams were used to cover the remaining distance until the railroad arrived. The name was also changed to Ryan at that time, in honor of John Ryan, "Borax" Smith's trusted supervisor.

The Ryan post office was opened here in 1906, and transferred to (new) Ryan in 1914. After that, Lila C was then also known as "Old Ryan."
