= Columbus Marsh =

Drainage basin in Nevada, United States

- Location within Nevada
- Floor elevation: 4,511 ft (1,375 m)

Geography
- Location: Esmeralda County, Nevada, United States
- Coordinates: 38°05′09″N 117°57′54″W
- Interactive map of Columbus Marsh

Columbus Marsh is a playa in Nevada, United States. William Troup (or Troop) discovered cottonball borax at the site in 1870 or 1871. Joseph Mosheimer and Emile K. Stevenot, who operated one of the borax concentrating plants at Columbus, hired Francis Marion Smith to cut wood for their plant on nearby Miller Mountain in the Candelaria Hills. Smith subsequently discovered borax himself at Teel's Marsh, where he had sufficient financial success to expand and acquire the borax works at Columbus himself in 1880.
