= Death Valley Railroad =

Railroad in California, United States

Overview
- Headquarters: Ryan, California
- Reporting mark: DVRR
- Locale: Ryan, California and Death Valley Junction, California
- Dates of operation: 1914–1931

Technical
- Track gauge: 3 ft (914 mm)

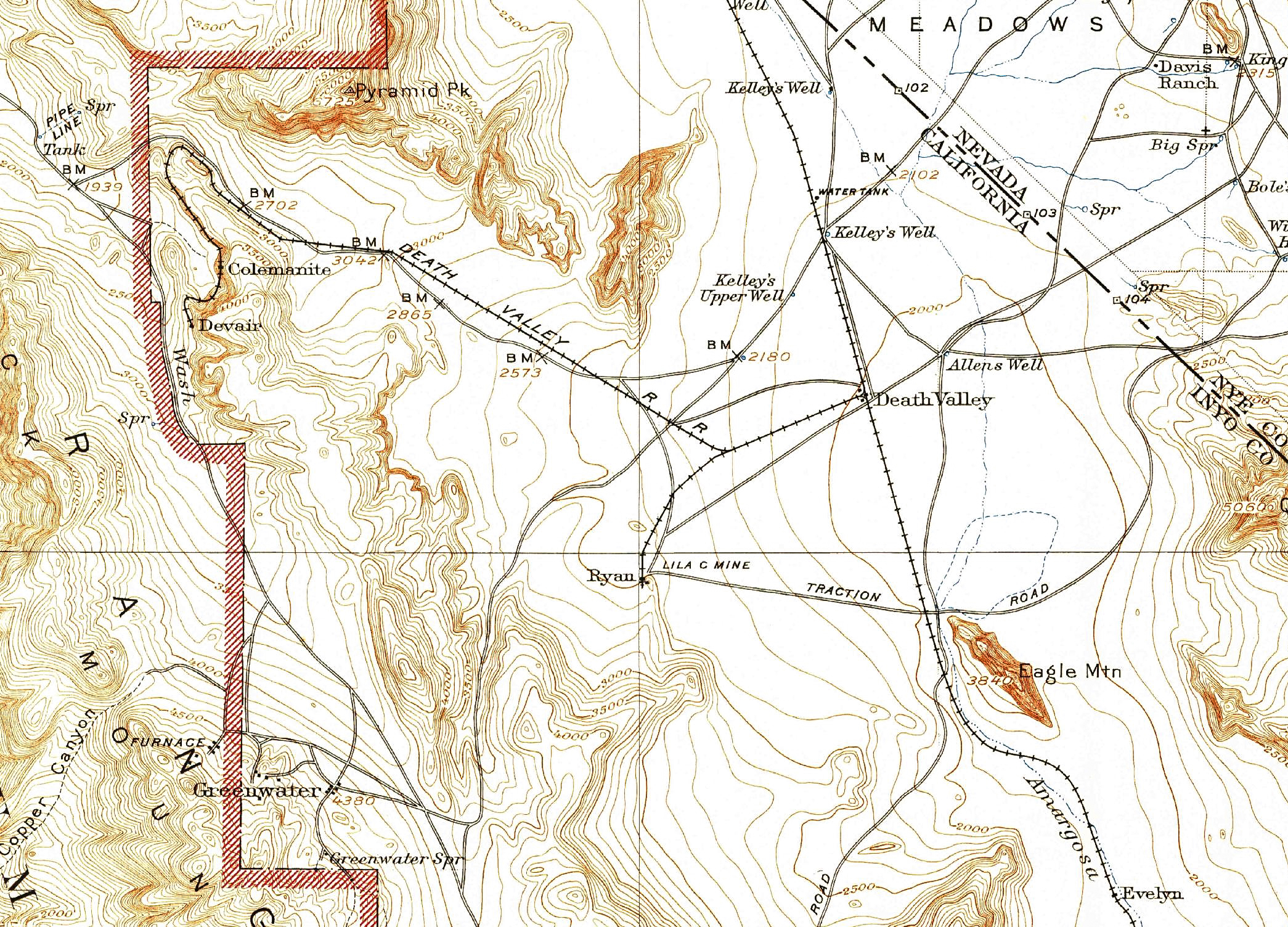
A map of the Death Valley Railroad running from Death Valley Junction all the way up to the mines at Ryan near Colemanite

The Death Valley Railroad (DVRR) was a 3 ft (914 mm) narrow-gauge railroad that operated in California's Death Valley to carry borax with the route running from Ryan, California, and the mines at Lila C, both located just east of Death Valley National Park, to Death Valley Junction, a distance of approximately 20 miles (32 km).

== History ==
When mining operations at the Lila C. Mine were declining around 1914, Pacific Coast Borax Company began scouting the land outside Furnace Creek for richer borax deposits. Once they found some a bit west of the present mines, plans were put forward to build a narrow-gauge railroad from the new mines to connect with the Tonopah and Tidewater Railroad at Death Valley Junction to ship the borax away for processing and packaging.

The line was built by a separate company from Pacific Coast Borax Company, because they were struggling with financial issues at the time. Equipment and Heisler locomotive #2 "Francis" from the Pacific Coast Borax Company's old Borate and Daggett Railroad were used to build the Death Valley Railroad. After the line was completed, two 2-8-0 steam locomotives were bought from the Baldwin Locomotive Works to work the line and Francis was sold off.

One train ran per day bringing food and water to the workers at the Ryan mine, and bought ore back late in the afternoon. After better deposits of borax were discovered at Boron, the Death Valley Railroad tried to resort to tourist operations by bringing in a Brill railcar to transport tourists to the old mines. Due to a lack of profit from tourists and freight trains and the closure of the mines, the railroad closed in 1931.

Much of the railroad ran parallel to what is today State Route 190. After this railroad ceased operations, the United States Potash Company bought the equipment, track and rolling stock to construct their own line located near Loving, New Mexico, which became the United States Potash Railroad. All the rails from the Death Valley Railroad were used on the new line until about 1941 when they were replaced by heavier-pound rails from the Atchison, Topeka & Santa Fe Railroad. The line was used until 1967 when better potash deposits were discovered in Saskatchewan and Pacific Coast Borax Company merged with U.S. Potash and became U.S. Borax & Chemical Cooperation.

== Preservation ==
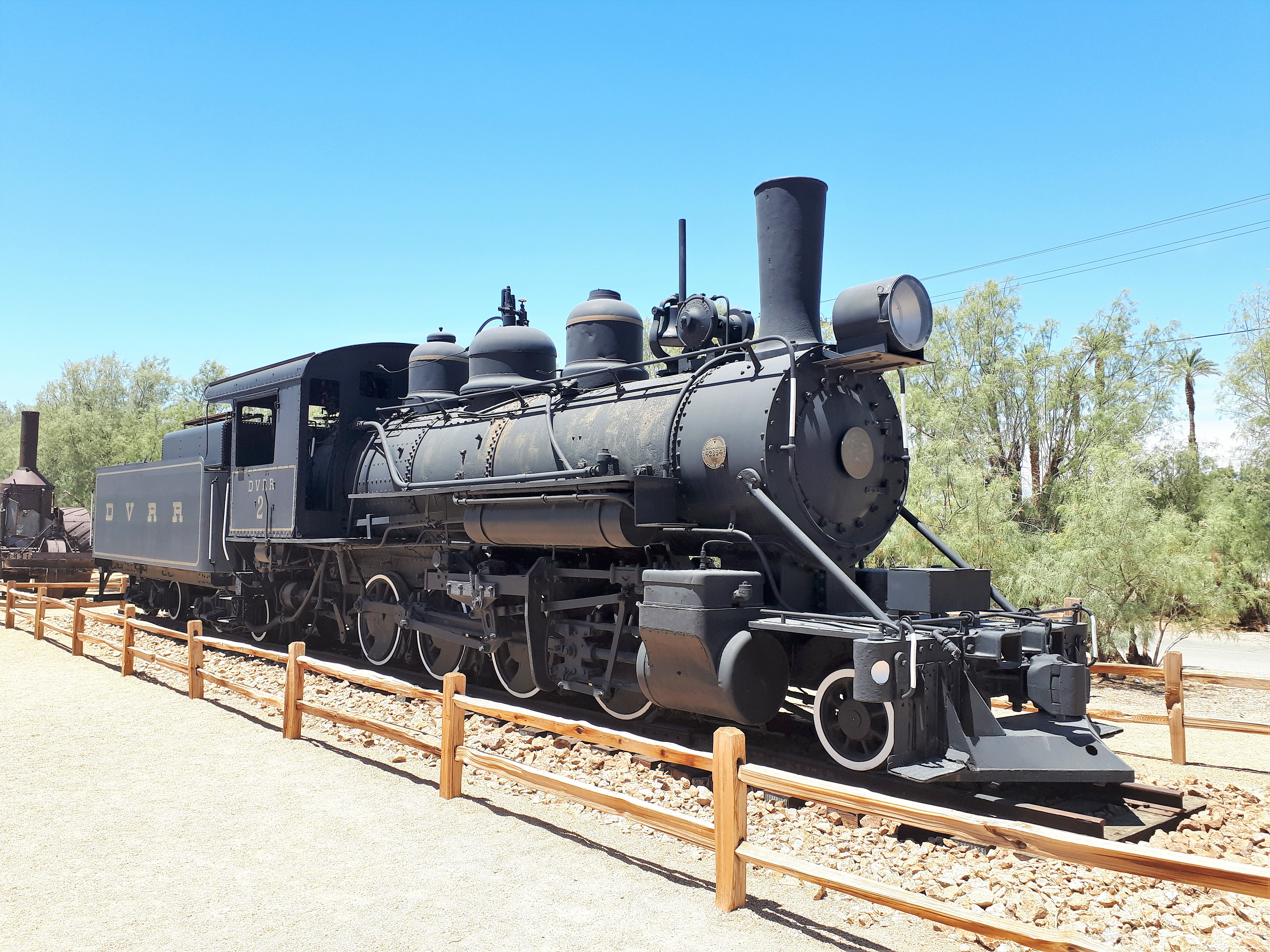
DVRR No. 2 at the Borax Museum at Furnace Creek, Death Valley National Park

All three engines that were on the Death Valley Railroad are preserved. After the United States Potash Railroad turned over their operations to diesel locomotives in the 1950s, the two ex-Death Valley Railroad engines were both singled out for preservation.

No. 1 was sent to Carlsbad, New Mexico and put on display in between Park Drive and E. Riverside Drive and sports the bold lettering of "U.S. Potash" on the sides of her tender.

No. 2 also worked for the United States Potash Railroad, but she was bought by the Death Valley National Park and is now currently at the Borax Museum at Furnace Creek.

A railcar was bought in the later years of the line in 1928, when Pacific Coast Borax attempted to save their dying railroads, DVRR included, from the scrapheap by promoting them as tourist attractions. It too, was bought by the United States Potash Railroad to transport workers to the potash mines. By 1967, it was worn out, but the Laws Rail Museum of Bishop, California managed to step in just in time to save it from scrap. After several years of extensive restoration, it now runs on the museum's 3 ft (914 mm) narrow-gauge track.

The bogey trucks of some of the old DVRR ore cars are said to still exist at Laws, whilst the old caboose (#100) still exists on the property of the old potash refinery site at Loving, New Mexico. The tankcar bodies (also ex-DVRR) are also located just outside Carlsbad.

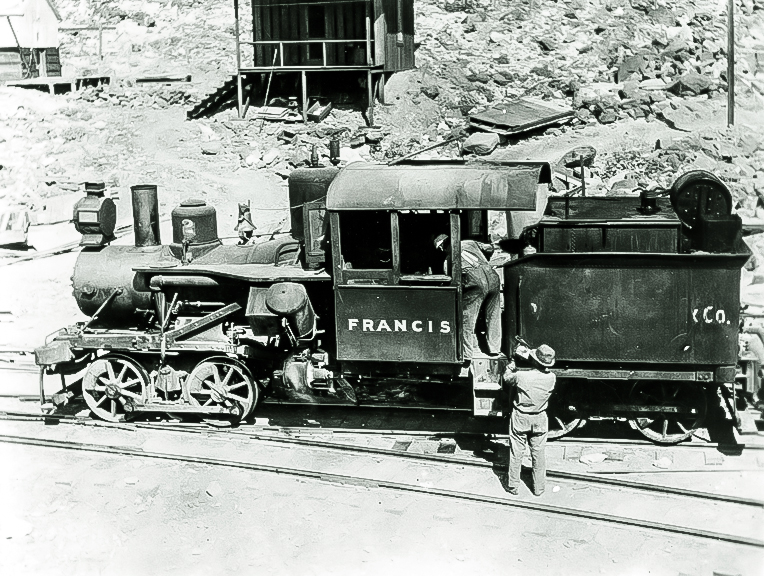
Heisler locomotive No. 2 "Francis" on the wye track at Ryan (formerly Devar), circa 1916.

The old Heisler locomotive "Francis" formerly from the Borate and Daggett Railroad, saw some years of service on the DVRR after construction was completed, that is until the arrival of Baldwin #2 in 1916. At that time the Heisler was sold off to the Nevada Short Line Railway, and ultimately saw use in the timber fields working for the Terry Lumber Company (later Red River Lumber). It was scrapped around 1925 after the closure of the Terry lumber mill following a devastating fire.
