= United States Potash Railroad =

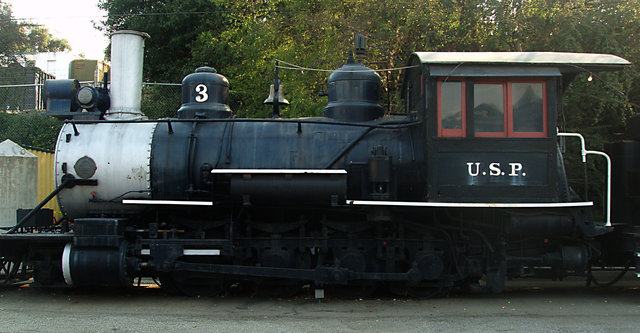
United States Potash Company Engine Number 3 on display at Fairplex (Pomona, California)

The United States Potash Railroad was a 3 ft (914 mm) narrow gauge railroad built in 1931 to carry potash from the mines to the mill at Loving, New Mexico where the Atchison, Topeka & Santa Fe Railroad had a spur that went out to the refinery to carry out the processed potash. The 16-mile (26 km) railroad was located at Loving, New Mexico, just east of Carlsbad, New Mexico, USA, and Carlsbad Caverns National Park.

== History ==
The railroad was originally built and operated with former Death Valley Railroad equipment, rails and employees. The two 2-8-0 Baldwin locomotives from the Death Valley Railroad, along with another engine of similar design coming from the Morenci & Southern Railroad, pulled the trains until about 1948 when they were replaced by specially-built diesel-electric locomotives from General Electric.

The railroad ceased operation in 1967 when U.S. Potash merged with Pacific Coast Borax Company to become the U.S. Borax & Chemical Corporation. Then they were bought out by Rio Tinto Minerals and moved their mining focus onto the borax at Boron.

== Preservation ==
Whilst the three diesels were scrapped, the three steam engines that worked the line all survived. No. 1 is currently on display near Municipal Beach Park at Carlsbad, New Mexico, No. 2 is on display at the Borax Museum at Furnace Creek in Death Valley, as she was Death Valley Railroad's No. 2 and sports her former railroad's colors. No. 3 is on display at the RailGiants Train Museum at Fairplex, Pomona, California. Death Valley Railroad's No. 5, a Brill railcar was used to transport workmen from Loving to work at the mine and the mill and she is now preserved at the Laws Railroad Museum at Bishop. A few trucks from the old DVRR ore cars and caboose are now at the Laws Railroad Museum. Two tankcar bodies, also ex-Death Valley Railroad, are located near Carlsbad.

== See also ==
- Trona Railway: a potash railroad in California
