= Pacific Coast Borax Company =

United States mining company founded in 1890

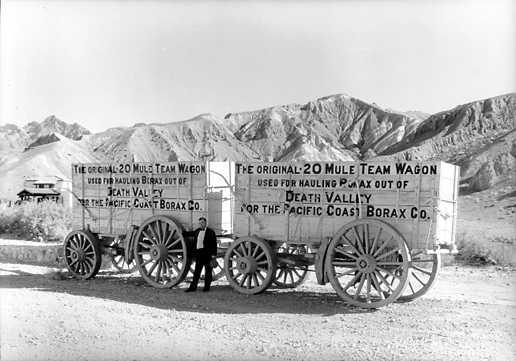
A 20-Mule Team Wagon, in Death Valley, California

The Pacific Coast Borax Company (PCB) was a United States mining company founded in 1890 by the American borax magnate Francis Smith, the "Borax King".

== History ==
The roots of the Pacific Coast Borax Company lie in Mineral County, Nevada, east of Mono Lake, where Smith, while contracting to provide firewood to a small borax operation at nearby Columbus Marsh, spotted Teel's Marsh while looking westward from the upper slopes of Miller Mountain where the only nearby trees were growing. Eventually, to satisfy his curiosity, Smith and two assistants visited Teel's Marsh and collected samples, that proved to assay higher than any known sources for borate. Returning to Teel's Marsh, Smith and his helpers staked claims and laid the foundation for his career as a borax miner.

With the help of his older brother, Julius, who came west from the family home in Wisconsin, and financial support from the two Storey brothers, operations began in 1872 under the name, Smith and Storey Brothers Borax Co. When the Storey brothers' interests were subsequently acquired in 1873, the name was shortened to Smith Brothers Borax Co. A few years later (circa 1884) it was changed again to Teel's Marsh Borax Co. In 1880, the separate and previously existing Pacific Borax Company (with no "Coast" in the name) was acquired by Smith. Frank Smith also developed holdings with his business associate William Tell Coleman at the Harmony Borax Works as well as the Meridian Borax Company, which were subsequently combined to form the Pacific Borax, Salt & Soda Company in 1888. The Pacific Coast Borax Co. name was not adopted until Smith acquired all of Coleman's borax interests in central Nevada and California, after Coleman's bankruptcy, and incorporated them all under the new company name in 1890.

== Processing plants ==
There were processing plants in Alameda, California and Bayonne, New Jersey.

One of the earliest reinforced concrete buildings constructed in the United States was the Pacific Coast Borax Company's refinery in Alameda, designedd by Ernest L. Ransome and built in 1893. It was the first to use ribbed floor construction as well as concrete columns.

== Death Valley ==
The Harmony Borax Works were part of what was acquired from Coleman by Smith in 1890. The borax was shipped via the Death Valley Railroad that the company built to the east, from Ryan, California, to Death Valley Junction, California. It then transferred to the narrow gauge Death Valley Railroad to meet up with the Tonopah and Tidewater Railroad (T&T) which ran from the Amargosa Valley south to the Atchison, Topeka and Santa Fe Railway railhead in Ludlow, California. The Borax Museum, located in Death Valley National Park, has a locomotive on display from the Death Valley Railroad.

== Other mines ==
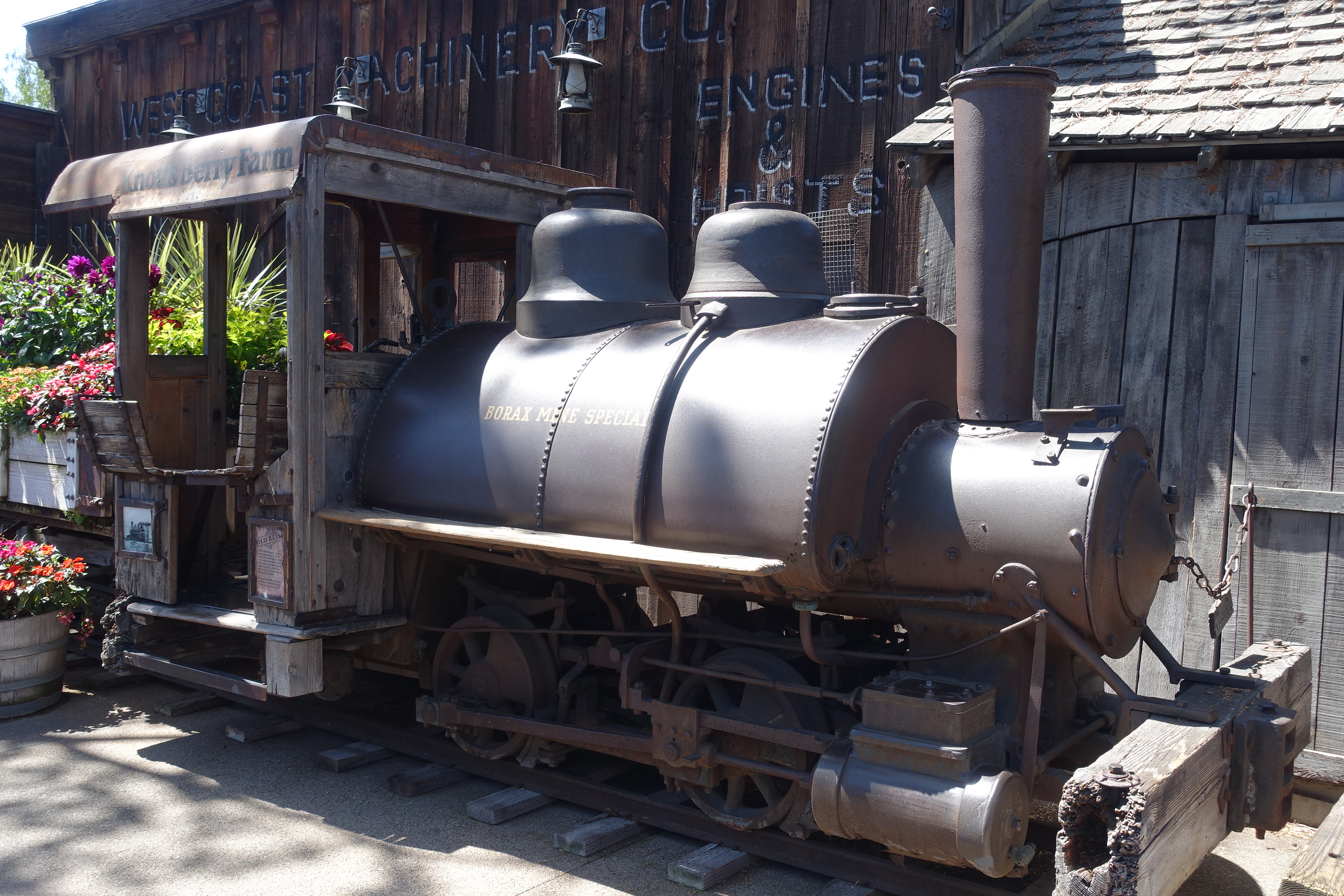
Westend chemical plant engine, on display at Knott's Berry Farm.

As Death Valley mining ran down, Smith developed new mines in the Calico Mountains near Yermo, California, and built the Borate and Daggett Railroad to haul product to the railhead in Daggett, California. Later, the company developed methods to process material from Searles Lake in the Searles Valley, building the company town of Westend and a siding on the Trona Railway for shipping to the railhead at Searles, California. Christian Brevoort Zabriskie joined the company in 1885, became its vice president and stayed until 1933. Zabriskie Point above Death Valley is named in his honor. A narrow-gauge steam engine that once served the Westend chemical plant is preserved at Knott's Berry Farm.

== 20 Mule Team Borax ==
The company established and aggressively developed and marketed the 20 Mule Team Borax trademark in order to promote the sale of its product. The name derived from the 20-mule teams that were used to transport borax out of Death Valley in the 1880s from Harmony Borax Works near Furnace Creek Ranch, owned by William Tell Coleman at that time and sold to Smith in 1890. They also produced Boraxo hand soap. The radio version of Death Valley Days ran from 1930 to 1951. The TV series Death Valley Days was hosted at one point by "Borateem-pitchman" and future U.S. President Ronald Reagan.

== Death Valley Junction Civic Center ==
In Death Valley Junction, California in 1923–24, the Pacific Coast Borax Company constructed, at a cost of $300,000 ($5,635,922 in 2025 dollars), a U-shaped Civic Center complex, around three sides of a town square, designed by architect Alexander Hamilton McCulloh. The Spanish Colonial Style adobe buildings included company offices, a store, an employee dorm, a 23-room hotel, dining room, lobby, gymnasium, billiard room and ice cream parlor.

At the northeast corner of the complex, was Corkill Hall, used for dances, church services, movies, funerals and town meetings, and became the Amargosa Opera House, in 1967.

Remodeled in 1927, in 1967, the west side of the complex became the Amargosa Hotel.

== Death Valley Hotel ==
In 1926, the Pacific Coast Borax Company created a subsidiary called the Death Valley Hotel Company to construct a Mission Revival style-luxury hotel near the Furnace Creek springs in the foothills of the Funeral Mountains overlooking Death Valley. The Furnace Creek Inn opened in February 1927, with transport via the motor-coach from the Ryan station of the Tonopah and Tidewater Railroad.

== U.S. Borax ==
In 1956, the Pacific Coast Borax Company merged with United States Potash Corporation to form U.S. Borax, which itself was acquired by Rio Tinto in 1967. As a wholly owned subsidiary, the company now is called Rio Tinto Borax and continues to supply nearly half the world's borates. U.S. Borax sold its flagship consumer product lines (Boraxo, Borateem and 20 Mule Team) to Dial Corporation in 1988. It continues to operate the Rio Tinto Borax Mine, which is the largest open-pit mine in California next to the company town of Boron, in the Mojave Desert east of Mojave, California.

The Trona operation later became part of Searles Valley Minerals.

== See also ==
- Panamint Valley
- Indian Wells Valley
- Potash wars (California)
