= Columbus, Nevada =

- Ghost town
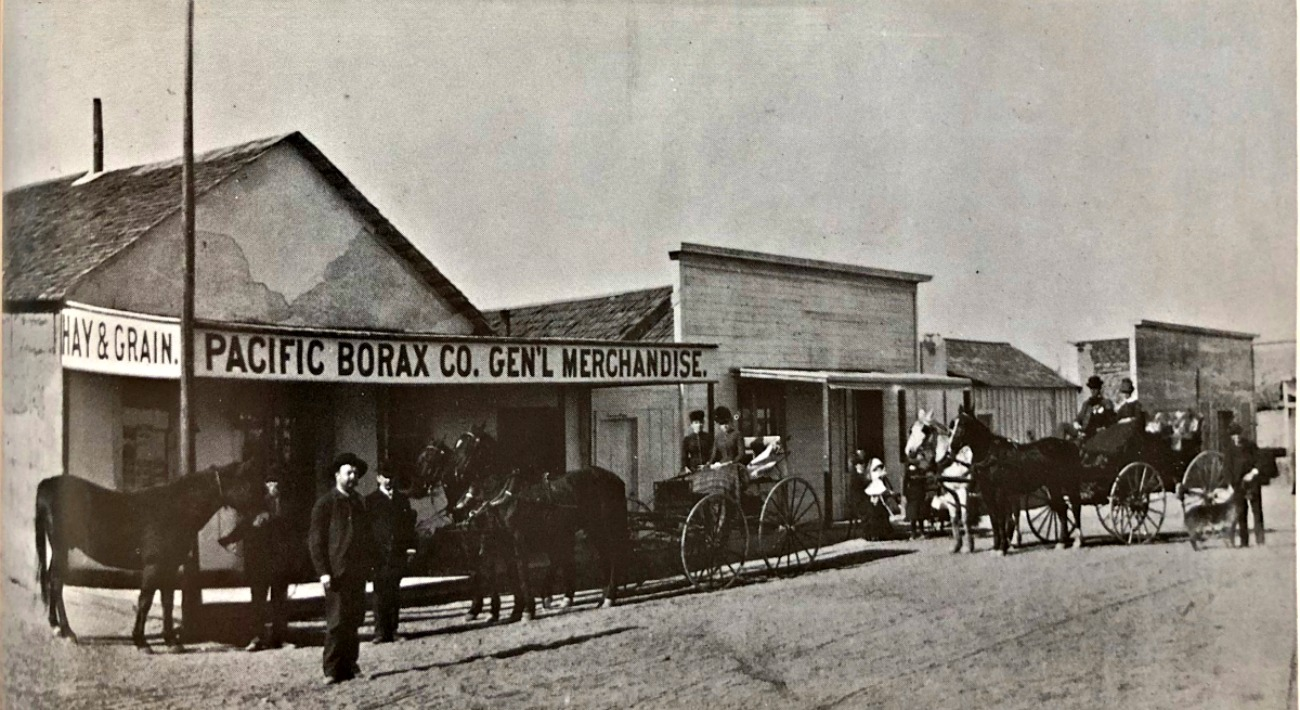

- Location within the state of Nevada Columbus (the United States)
- Coordinates: 38°06′37″N 118°01′09″W
- Country: United States
- State: Nevada
- County: Esmeralda
- Time zone: UTC-8 (Pacific (PST))
  - Summer (DST): UTC-7 (PDT)

Nevada Historical Marker
- Reference no.: 20

Columbus was a borax mining boom town in Esmeralda County, Nevada, United States. Its remnants are located on the edge of the Columbus Salt Marsh.

== History ==
In 1863, a group of Spanish miners discovered silver in the area. The Columbus mining camp was established two years later, when American miners began to mine gold and silver nearby. A stamp mill was moved to the town from Aurora in 1866. Columbus was the ideal location for a mill, as it was the only stop for several miles with sufficient amounts of water for the operation of a mill. It was not until 1871 that borax was discovered near the town's site, and as a result Columbus increased substantially in its importance.

Borax was discovered at a salt marsh near town by William Troop in 1871. The site later became known as the Columbus Marsh. By 1873, four borax companies were actively working the deposits on the marsh. Columbus' zenith occurred around 1875, when there were around 1,000 people in the town. Borax plants ran continuously day and night, for eight months during the year. The town had a post office and local newspaper, The Borax Miner, an adobe school, and an iron foundry. Stage express offered daily service to Fish Lake Valley, Candelaria, and, after 1876, Wadsworth.

Columbus began to decline in 1875, when the Pacific Borax Company built a larger plant at Fish Lake, 30 miles south of the town. By 1880, the population had dwindled to 100 people. By the mid-1880s, mining and commercial activity had ceased in the area, and Columbus slowly became a ghost town.

== Notes ==
William Caruthers, in his Loafing Along Death Valley Trails (Ontario: Death Valley Publishing Co., 1951), says that Francis M. "Borax" Smith discovered the borax at Columbus Marsh.

== Gallery ==
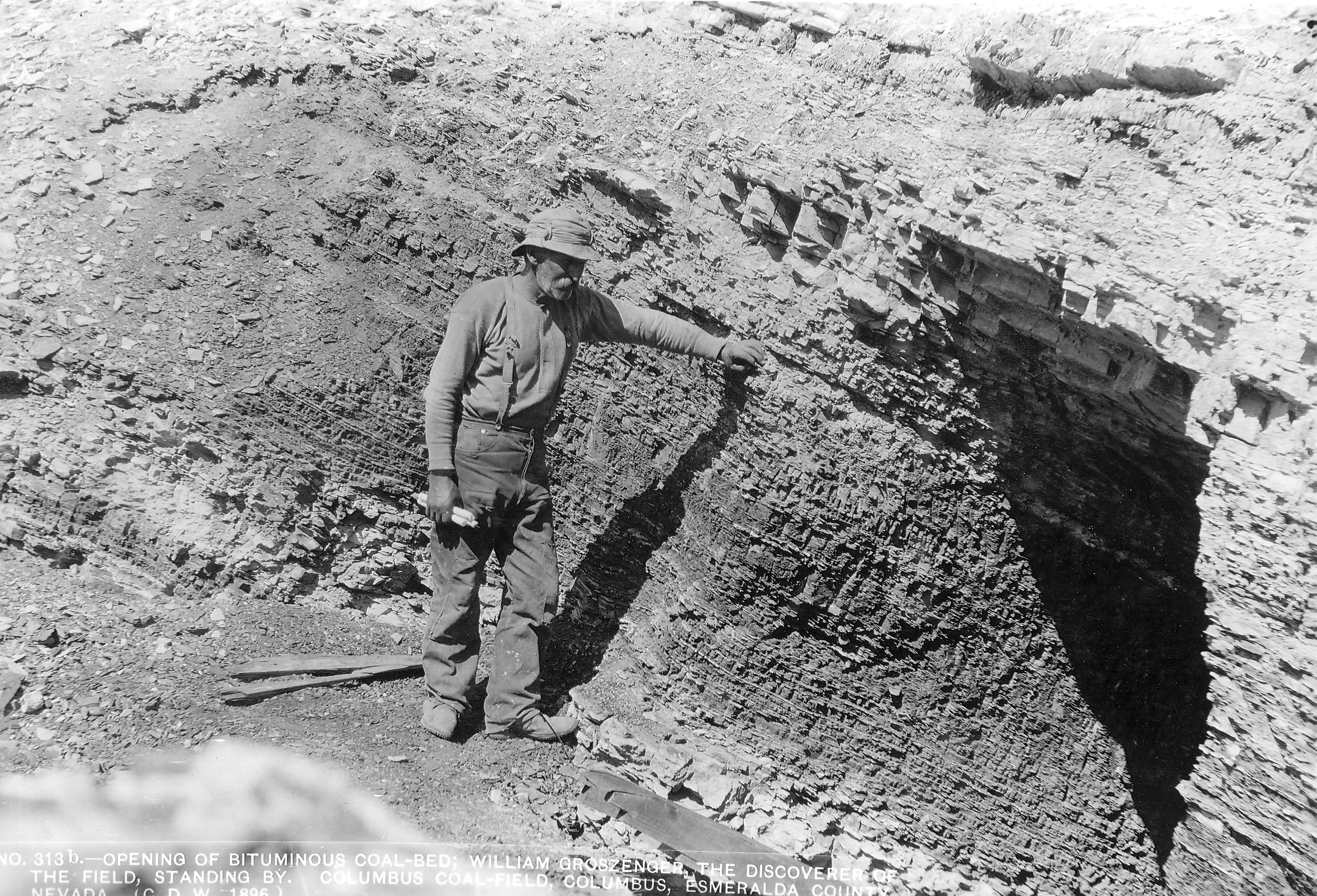
William Groszenger, next to the Columbus coal field, 1896

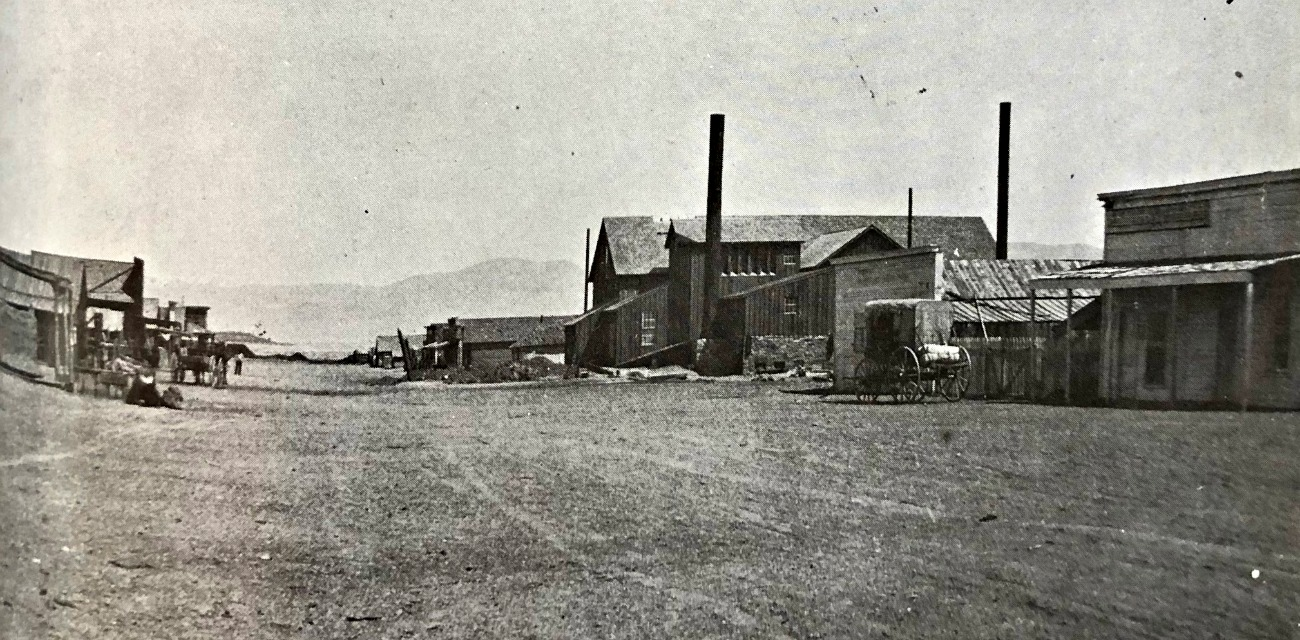
Downtown Columbus, 1870s

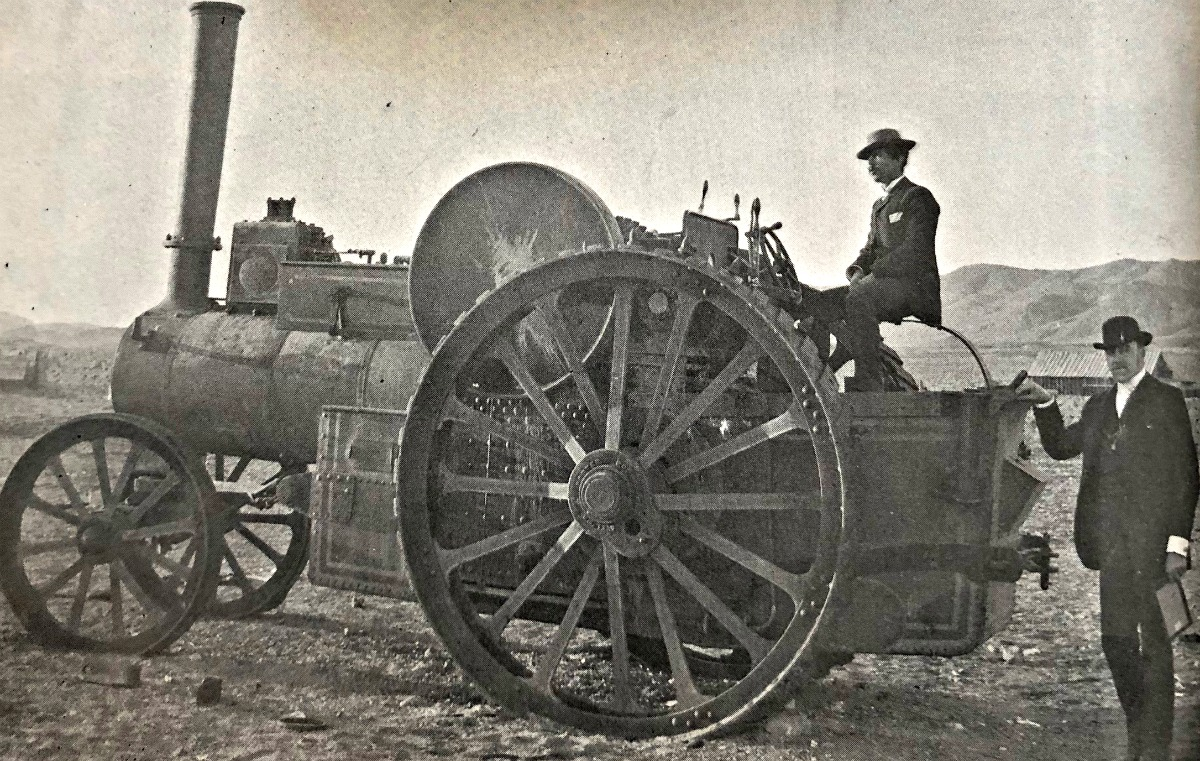
Steam tractor, Columbus, 1890s

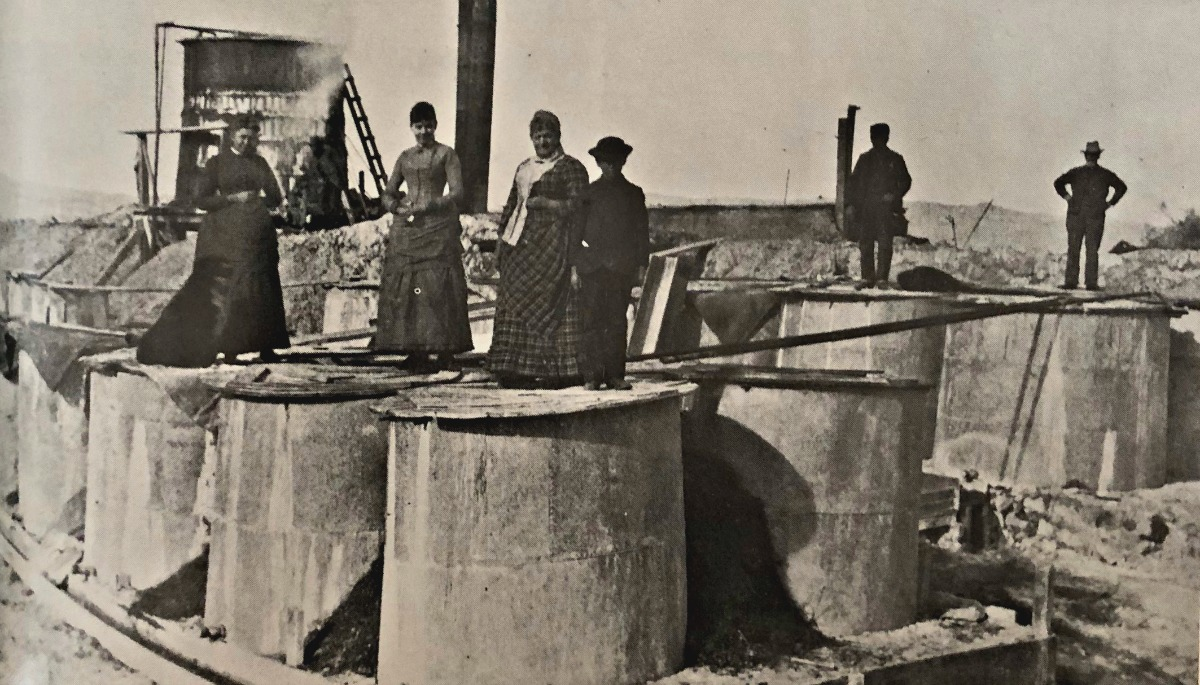
Borax refining tanks, Columbus, 1870s
