= Teel's Marsh =

Playa in Nevada, United States

- Location within Nevada

Geology
- Type: playa

Geography
- Location: Mineral County, Nevada, United States
- Coordinates: 38°12′19.893″N 118°21′35.398″W
- Interactive map of Teel's Marsh

Teel's Marsh is a playa in Nevada, United States. It was the site of "Borax" Smith's first borax works at Marietta, Nevada in 1872, and became the start of his operations that soon became the largest borax operation in the world.
