= Swamper (occupational title) =

Occupational term for an assistant worker in support of a skilled worker

Swamper is an occupational slang term for an assistant worker (unskilled helper, maintenance person, or someone who performs odd jobs) in support of a skilled worker. According to the Oxford English Dictionary, the term has its origins circa 1857 in the southern United States to refer to a workman who cleared roads for a timber feller in a swamp.

== Usage ==
- In the trucking industry (primarily moving & storage), a truck driver's assistant who performs a variety of tasks as a helper under supervision of the operator but does not drive.
- In logging, somebody who clears brush ahead of skilled fellers, clears paths for logs to be transported to the landing, or limbs felled trees before they are bucked.
- In the restaurant industry, a kitchen aid, and personnel who clean up after closing of a restaurant, bar, or nightclub.
- In the United States Forest Service, a firefighter who assists a more skilled firefighter. For example a saw swamper clears cut brush and trees behind a sawyer and a dozer swamper works as an assistant to a bulldozer operator.
- In commercial river outfitting, an assistant to the main pilot of the boat, who helps with cooking and setup and takedown of campsites.
- A laborer in the oil and gas transportation services used in the exploration, development and production of oil and natural gas resources.
- In US Prisons a swamper is a cleaner and general assistant to Corrections Officers.
