= 20 Mule Team Borax =

American cleaning product brand

- Product type: Laundry aid, household cleaner, mold cleaner, insecticide
- Current owner: Henkel
- Country: Harmony Borax Works, Death Valley, California
- Introduced: 1891; 135 years ago
- Related brands: Boraxo hand soap (discontinued)
- Markets: United States, Canada
- Previous owners: Pacific Coast Borax Company (1891–1956), U.S. Borax, Inc. (1956–1988)
- Website: www.20muleteamlaundry.com

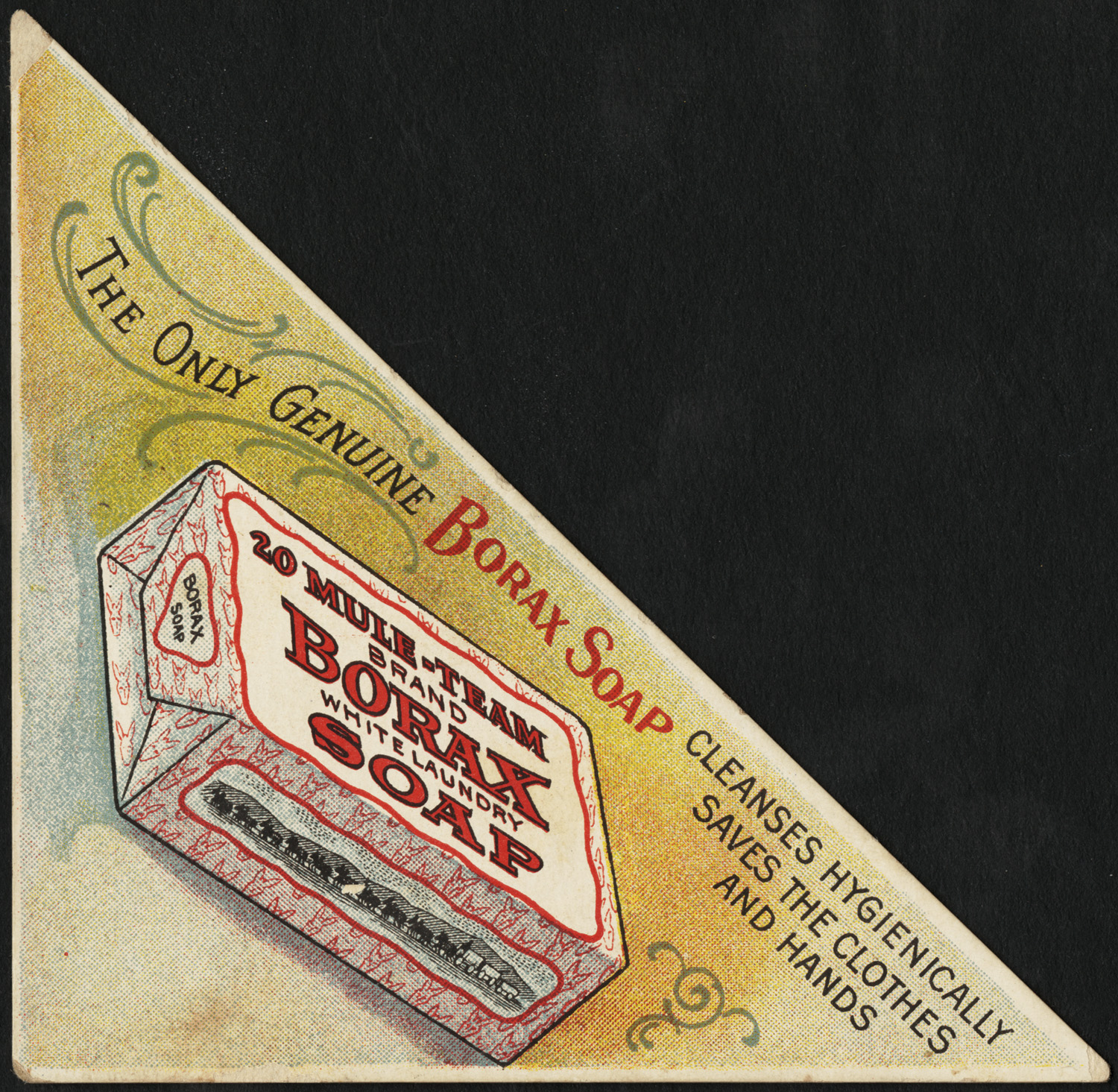
20 Mule Team brand Borax white laundry soap

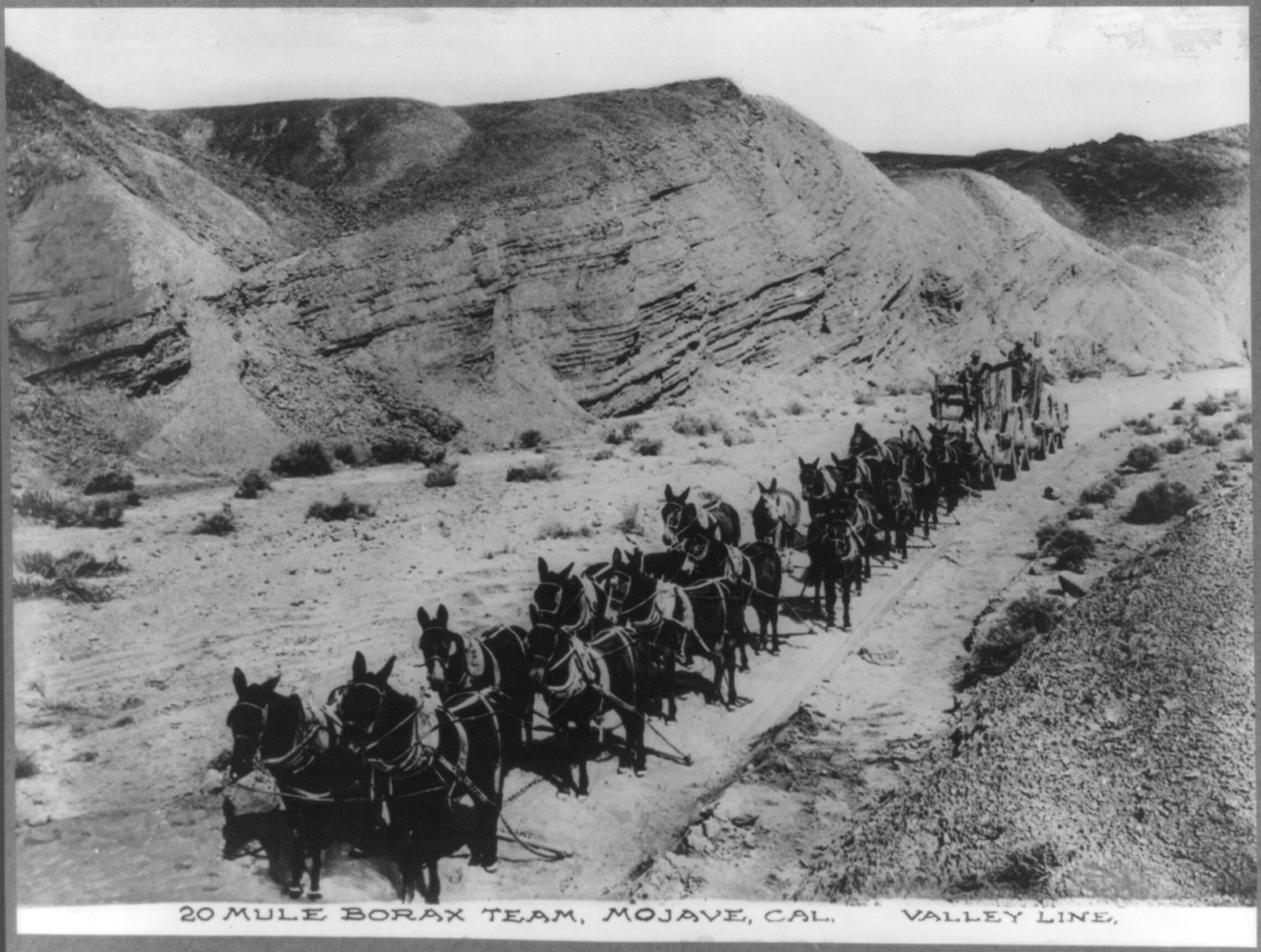
The mule teams hauled borax from the mine to the nearest railroad - in this case, at Mojave, California. Rail transportation was far less expensive than wagon transport.

20 Mule Team Borax is a brand of non chlorine bleach cleaner, manufactured in the United States by The Dial Corporation, a subsidiary of Henkel. The product consists of a mix of borax (also known as sodium borate, sodium tetraborate, or disodium tetraborate) and other chemicals.

Named after the 20-mule teams that were used by William Tell Coleman's company to move borax out of Death Valley, California, to the nearest rail spur between 1883 and 1889.

== Related products ==
Borateem Bleach, Borateem Plus bleach substitute, and 20 Mule Team Borax were all once manufactured by United States Borax & Chemical Corporation (now known as US Borax, Inc.). Borateem products originally contained over 98% borax. Borateem, now manufactured by Dial Corporation, is a chlorine-free, color-safe bleach powder but contains no borax.

Boraxo, also originally a 20 Mule Team product, was a borax-based powdered hand soap first manufactured by the Pacific Coast Borax Company, later by US Borax via merger, and finally acquired by Dial. The Boraxo line expanded to include powdered and liquid hand cleaners but was discontinued by Dial in 2021 or 2022.

== History ==
20-mule teams were first used by Francis Marion Smith to transport borax from the desert. Smith subsequently acquired Coleman's holdings in 1890 and consolidated them with his own to form the Pacific Coast Borax Company. After the 20-mule teams were replaced by a new rail spur, the name 20 Mule Team Borax was established and aggressively promoted by Pacific Coast Borax to increase sales.

Stephen Mather, son of J. W. Mather and administrator of the company's New York office, persuaded Smith to add the name 20 Mule Team Borax to accompany the sketch of the mule team already on the box. The 20-mule team symbol was first used in 1891 and registered in 1894. In 1988, just over 20 years after the acquisition of U.S. Borax by Rio Tinto, the Boraxo, Borateem and 20-Mule Team product lines were sold to Dial Corporation by U.S. Borax.

Dial is now an American consumer products unit of Henkel.
