= Mojave, California =

- Unincorporated community
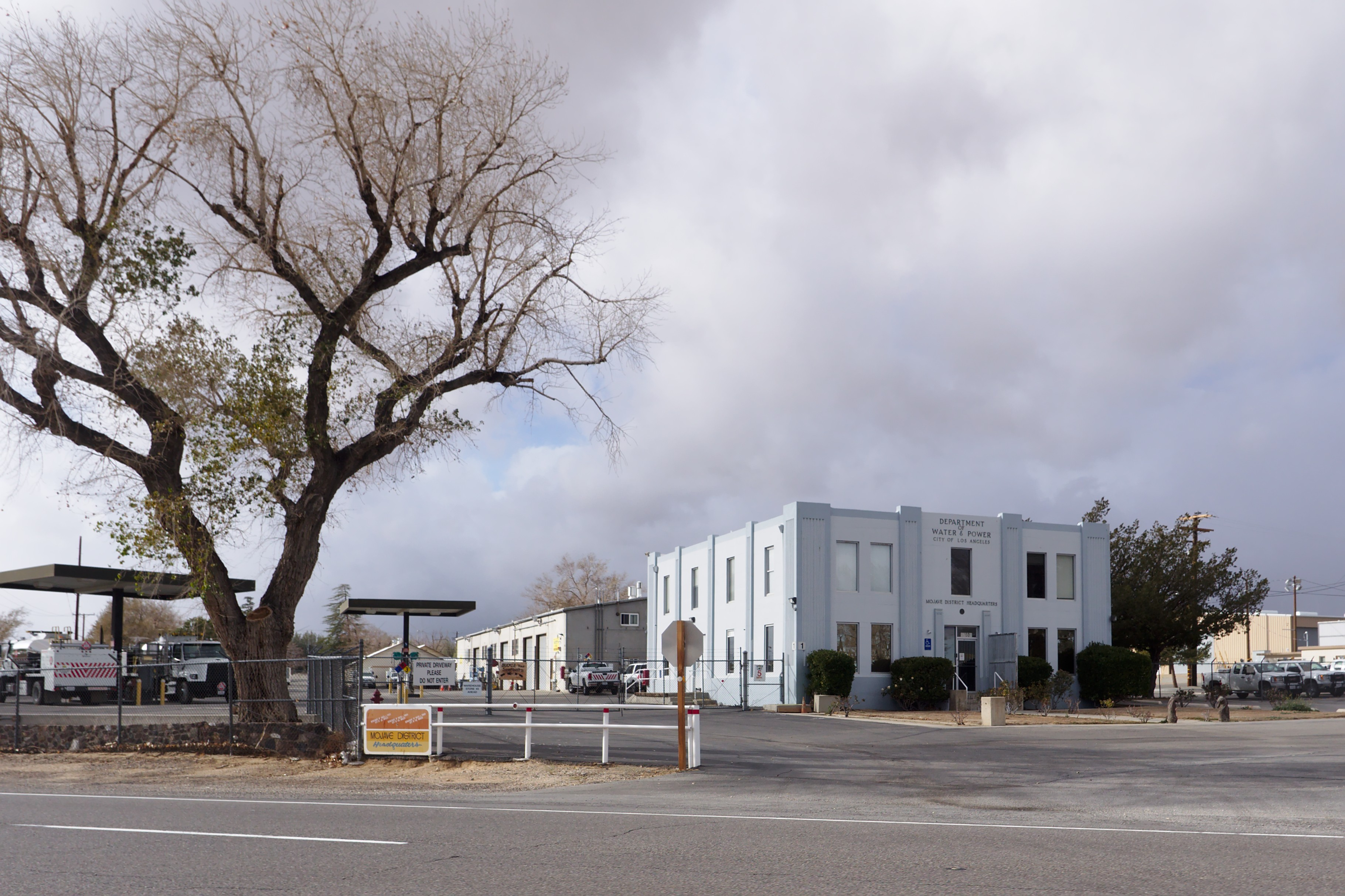
- LADWP Mojave District Headquarters

- Location in Kern County and the state of California

- Location in the United States
- Coordinates: 35°03′09″N 118°10′26″W
- Country: United States
- State: California
- County: Kern

Government
  - State senator: Shannon Grove (R)
  - Assemblymember: Tom Lackey (R)
  - U. S. rep.: Vince Fong (R); Jay Obernolte (R)

Area
  - Total: 58.453 sq mi (151.392 km^{2})
  - Land: 58.373 sq mi (151.185 km^{2})
  - Water: 0.080 sq mi (0.207 km^{2}) 0.14%
- Elevation: 2,762 ft (842 m)

Population (2020)
  - Total: 4,699
  - Density: 80.50/sq mi (31.08/km^{2})
- Time zone: UTC-8 (PST)
  - Summer (DST): UTC-7 (PDT)
- ZIP codes: 93501, 93502, 93519
- Area code: 661
- FIPS code: 06-48452
- GNIS feature ID: 1652752
- Website: visitmojave.com

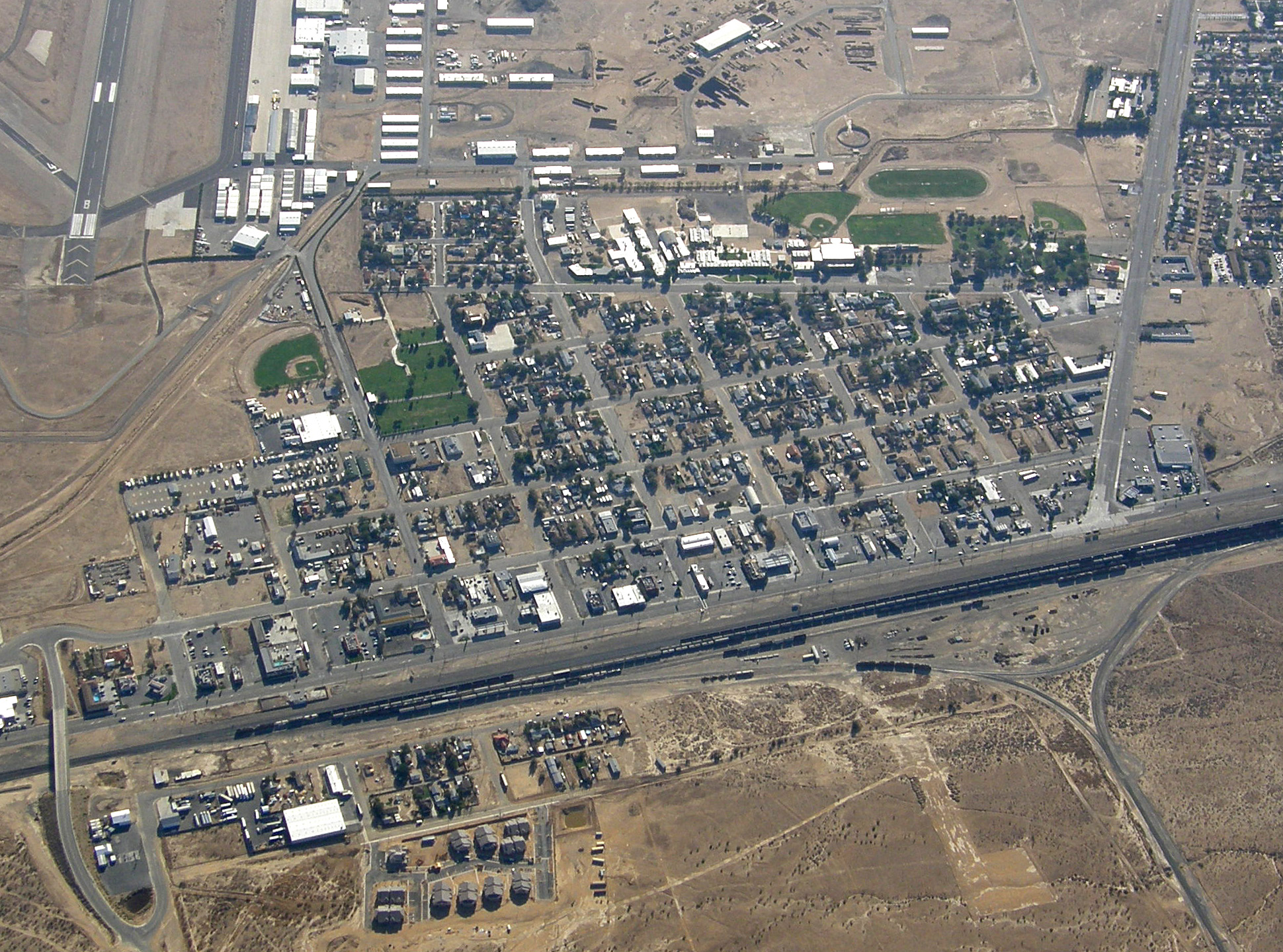
Mojave, looking east, from 10,000 feet (3,000 m)

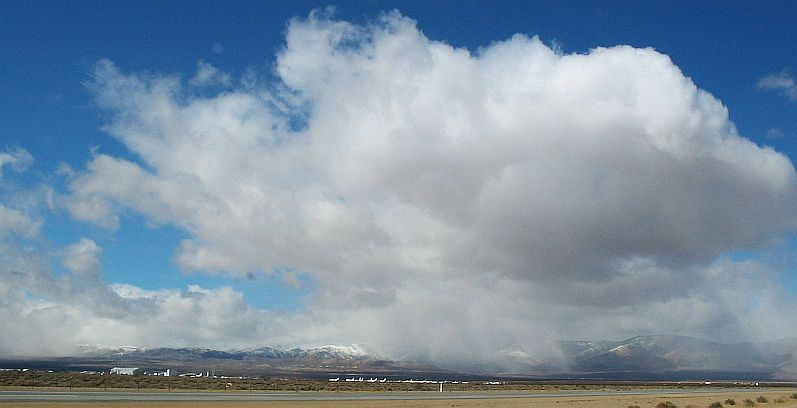
The Mojave Air and Space Port as viewed from nearby Highway 58

Mojave (formerly Mohave) is an unincorporated community in Kern County, California, United States. Mojave is located 50 miles (80 km) southeast of Bakersfield, and 100 miles (161 km) north of Los Angeles, at an elevation of 2,762.46 feet (842.00 m). The town is located in the western region of the Mojave Desert, below and east of Oak Creek Pass and the Tehachapi Mountains. Mojave is on the Pacific Crest Trail.

The population was 4,700 at the 2020 census, up from 4,238 at the 2010 census. Telephone numbers in Mojave follow the format (661) 824-xxxx and the area includes three postal ZIP Codes.

== History ==
The town of Mojave began in 1876 as a construction camp on the Southern Pacific Railroad. From 1884 to 1889, the town was the western terminus of the 166-mile (267 km), twenty-mule team at Harmony Borax Works in Death Valley. It later served as headquarters for construction of the Los Angeles Aqueduct.

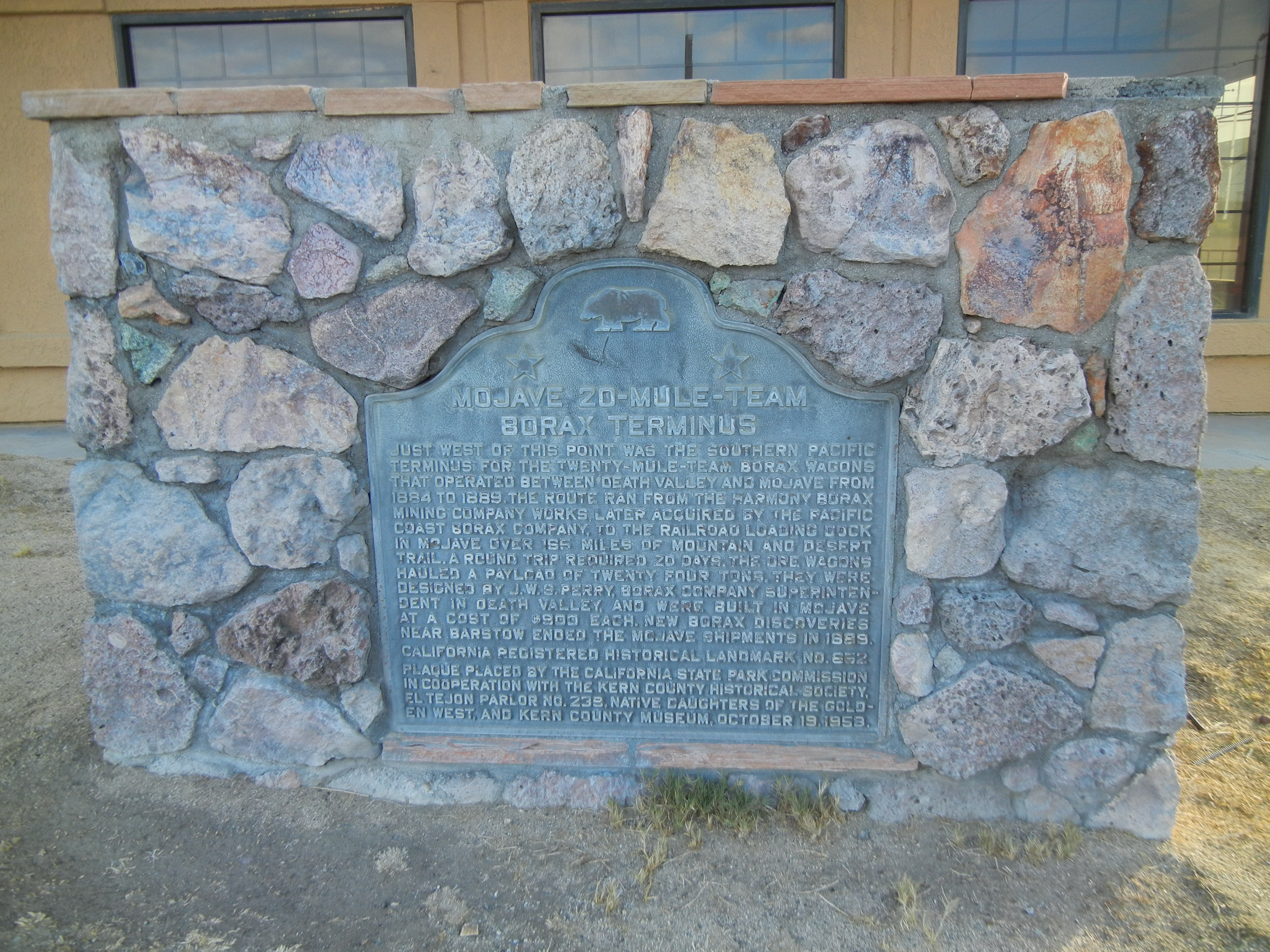
20 Mule Team Terminus: Sign in Mojave, CA

=== Mojave Airport: aviation and military use ===
Located near Edwards Air Force Base, Naval Air Weapons Station China Lake, and Palmdale Regional Airport, Mojave has a rich aerospace history. Besides being a general-use public airport, Mojave has three main areas of activity: flight testing, space industry development, and aircraft heavy maintenance and storage. The closest airfield to the city, formerly known as the Mojave Airport, is now part of the Mojave Air and Space Port.

In 1935, Kern County established the Mojave Airport 0.5 miles (0.8 km) east of town to serve the gold and silver mining industry in the area. The airport consisted of two dirt runways, one of which was oiled, but it lacked any fueling or servicing facilities. In 1941, the Civil Aeronautics Board began improvements to the airport for national defense purposes that included two 4,500 by 150 foot (1,372 by 46 m) asphalt runways and an adjacent taxiway. Kern County agreed the airport could be taken over by the military in the event of war.

Following the Japanese attack on Pearl Harbor in December 1941, the U.S. Marine Corps took over the airport and expanded it into Marine Corps Auxiliary Air Station (MCAAS) Mojave. The two existing runways were extended and a third one added. Barracks were constructed to house 2,735 male and 376 female military personnel. Civilian employment at the base would peak at 178. The Marines would eventually spend more than $7 million on the base, which totaled 2,325 acres (941 ha).

Many of the Corps' World War II aces received their gunnery training at Mojave. During World War II, Mojave hosted 29 aircraft squadrons, four Carrier Aircraft Service Detachments, and three Air Warning Squadrons. At its peak, the air station had 147 training and other aircraft. Mojave also had a 75 by 157 foot (23 by 48 m) swimming pool that was used to train aviators in emergency water egress and for recreation. The base's 900-seat auditorium hosted several USO shows that featured Bob Hope, Frances Langford and Marilyn Maxwell.

With the end of WWII, MCAAS was decommissioned on February 7, 1946; a U.S. Navy Air Station was established the same day. The Navy used the airport for drone operations for less than a year, closing it on January 1, 1947. The base remained closed for four years until the outbreak of the Korean War. Mojave was reactivated as an auxiliary landing field to MCAS El Toro. The airport was recommissioned as a MCAAS on December 31, 1953. Squadrons used Mojave for ordnance training when El Toro had bad weather. Marine Corps reserve units were temporarily deployed to Mojave for two week periods. MCAAS Mojave personnel peaked at 400 military and 200 civilians during this period.

In 1961, after the USMC transferred operations to MCAS El Centro, Kern County obtained title to the airport. In February 1972, the East Kern Airport District (EKAD) was formed to administer the airport; EKAD maintains the airport to this day. To a great extent EKAD was the brainchild of Dan Sabovich who heavily lobbied the state for the airport district's creation and ran EKAD until 2002.

During the 1970s, Mojave Airport was served by commuter air carrier Golden West Airlines with scheduled passenger flights operated with de Havilland Canada DHC-6 Twin Otter turboprops direct to Los Angeles (LAX).

=== Mojave Air and Space Port ===
On November 20, 2012, the EKAD Board of Directors voted to change the name of the district to the Mojave Air and Space Port. Officials said that the spaceport name is well known around the world, but EKAD is not. The change took effect on January 1, 2013.

The airport is now the home of various aerospace companies and institutions such as Scaled Composites and the civilian National Test Pilot School. The town was home to the Rutan Voyager, the first aircraft to fly around the world nonstop and unrefueled. The airport is also the first inland spaceport in the United States, and was the location of the first private spaceflight, the launch of SpaceShipOne on June 21, 2004.

Mojave also has a Mojave Transportation Museum.

== Geography ==
Mojave is located at 35°03′09″N 118°10′26″W. According to the United States Census Bureau, the census-designated place has a total area of 58.45 square miles (151.4 km^{2}), over 99% of which is land.

=== Climate ===
Mojave has a desert climate (Köppen: BWk). It has hot summers and cool winters. Average January temperatures are a maximum of 57.8 °F (14.3 °C) and a minimum of 34.3 °F (1.3 °C). Average July temperatures are a maximum of 97.7 °F (36.5 °C) and a minimum of 69.8 °F (21 °C). There are an average of 98 days with highs of 90 °F (32 °C) and an average of 45.7 days with lows of 32 °F (0 °C). The record high temperature was 118 °F (48 °C) on August 5, 1914. The record low temperature was 8 °F (−13 °C) on December 23, 1990.

Average annual rainfall is 5.96 inches (15.1 cm). There are an average of 22 days with measurable precipitation. The wettest year was 1983 with 15.51 inches (39.4 cm) and the driest year was 1942 with 0.85 inches (2.2 cm). The most rainfall in one month was 6.85 inches (17.4 cm) in February 1998. The most rainfall in 24 hours was 3 inches (7.6 cm) on January 30, 1915. Snow is relatively rare in Mojave, averaging 1.7 inches (4.3 cm). The most snowfall in one month was 11 inches (28 cm) in February 1911.

Climate data for Mojave, California, 1991–2020 normals, extremes 1904–2021
Month	Jan	Feb	Mar	Apr	May	Jun	Jul	Aug	Sep	Oct	Nov	Dec	Year
Record high °F (°C)	82 (28)	90 (32)	89 (32)	99 (37)	104 (40)	112 (44)	117 (47)	118 (48)	110 (43)	100 (38)	96 (36)	79 (26)	118 (48)
Mean maximum °F (°C)	68.5 (20.3)	73.0 (22.8)	79.6 (26.4)	87.0 (30.6)	95.1 (35.1)	102.1 (38.9)	106.8 (41.6)	105.0 (40.6)	99.9 (37.7)	92.0 (33.3)	79.4 (26.3)	69.3 (20.7)	107.9 (42.2)
Mean daily maximum °F (°C)	57.9 (14.4)	60.4 (15.8)	66.5 (19.2)	71.6 (22.0)	80.8 (27.1)	90.8 (32.7)	97.2 (36.2)	97.2 (36.2)	89.5 (31.9)	78.4 (25.8)	66.2 (19.0)	56.5 (13.6)	76.1 (24.5)
Daily mean °F (°C)	45.3 (7.4)	47.6 (8.7)	53.4 (11.9)	58.4 (14.7)	67.0 (19.4)	77.2 (25.1)	83.1 (28.4)	82.2 (27.9)	75.0 (23.9)	63.9 (17.7)	52.4 (11.3)	44.2 (6.8)	62.5 (16.9)
Mean daily minimum °F (°C)	32.8 (0.4)	34.9 (1.6)	40.3 (4.6)	45.3 (7.4)	53.2 (11.8)	63.6 (17.6)	69.1 (20.6)	67.2 (19.6)	60.6 (15.9)	49.4 (9.7)	38.6 (3.7)	31.8 (−0.1)	48.9 (9.4)
Mean minimum °F (°C)	23.4 (−4.8)	27.6 (−2.4)	31.9 (−0.1)	36.1 (2.3)	42.6 (5.9)	50.5 (10.3)	60.6 (15.9)	58.2 (14.6)	50.3 (10.2)	39.6 (4.2)	30.1 (−1.1)	22.9 (−5.1)	21.0 (−6.1)
Record low °F (°C)	10 (−12)	16 (−9)	17 (−8)	27 (−3)	32 (0)	38 (3)	43 (6)	47 (8)	31 (−1)	22 (−6)	13 (−11)	8 (−13)	8 (−13)
Average precipitation inches (mm)	1.08 (27)	1.49 (38)	0.80 (20)	0.21 (5.3)	0.13 (3.3)	0.03 (0.76)	0.18 (4.6)	0.17 (4.3)	0.10 (2.5)	0.42 (11)	0.34 (8.6)	0.81 (21)	5.76 (146.36)
Average snowfall inches (cm)	0.5 (1.3)	0.1 (0.25)	0.2 (0.51)	0.0 (0.0)	0.0 (0.0)	0.0 (0.0)	0.0 (0.0)	0.0 (0.0)	0.0 (0.0)	0.0 (0.0)	0.0 (0.0)	0.4 (1.0)	1.2 (3.06)
Average precipitation days (≥ 0.01 in)	3.9	4.2	2.8	1.5	0.7	0.2	0.3	0.4	0.4	1.4	1.6	2.8	20.2
Average snowy days (≥ 0.1 in)	0.2	0.1	0.0	0.0	0.0	0.0	0.0	0.0	0.0	0.0	0.0	0.1	0.4
Source 1: NOAA
Source 2: XMACIS2

== Demographics ==
Historical population
Census	Pop.	Note	%±
1950	2,055		—
1960	1,845		−10.2%
1970	2,573		39.5%
1980	2,886		12.2%
1990	3,763		30.4%
2000	3,836		1.9%
2010	4,238		10.5%
2020	4,699		10.9%
U.S. Decennial Census; 1860–1870 1880-1890; 1900 1910 1920; 1930 1940 1950; 1960 1970 1980; 1990 2000 2010; 2020

For statistical purposes, the United States Census Bureau has defined Mojave as a census-designated place (CDP). Mojave first appeared as an unincorporated place in the 1950 U.S. census; and as a census designated place in the 1980 United States census.

=== Racial and ethnic composition ===
Mojave CDP, California – Racial and ethnic composition Note: the US Census treats Hispanic/Latino as an ethnic category. This table excludes Latinos from the racial categories and assigns them to a separate category. Hispanics/Latinos may be of any race.
Race / Ethnicity (NH = Non-Hispanic)	Pop 2000	Pop 2010	Pop 2020	% 2000	% 2010	% 2020
White alone (NH)	2,291	1,843	1,430	59.72%	43.49%	30.43%
Black or African American alone (NH)	208	603	923	5.42%	14.23%	19.64%
Native American or Alaska Native alone (NH)	36	28	47	0.94%	0.66%	1.00%
Asian alone (NH)	73	44	71	1.90%	1.04%	1.51%
Native Hawaiian or Pacific Islander alone (NH)	5	11	5	0.13%	0.26%	0.11%
Other race alone (NH)	11	4	48	0.29%	0.09%	1.02%
Mixed race or Multiracial (NH)	126	113	175	3.28%	2.67%	3.72%
Hispanic or Latino (any race)	1,086	1,592	2,000	28.31%	37.56%	42.56%
Total	3,836	4,238	4,699	100.00%	100.00%	100.00%

=== 2020 census ===
As of the 2020 census, Mojave had a population of 4,699. The population density was 81 inhabitants per square mile (31/km^{2}). The median age was 32.3 years. 30.2% of residents were under the age of 18 and 12.4% were 65 years of age or older. The age distribution was 8.7% aged 18 to 24, 26.4% aged 25 to 44, and 22.4% aged 45 to 64. For every 100 females, there were 97.3 males, and for every 100 females age 18 and over there were 92.4 males age 18 and over.

The census reported that 99.6% of the population lived in households, 0.4% lived in non-institutionalized group quarters, and no one was institutionalized. 0.0% of residents lived in urban areas, while 100.0% lived in rural areas.

There were 1,677 households, out of which 37.3% included children under the age of 18. Of all households, 31.8% were married-couple households, 9.5% were cohabiting couple households, 34.0% had a female householder with no spouse or partner present, and 24.6% had a male householder with no spouse or partner present. 29.2% of households were one person, and 9.4% were one person aged 65 or older. The average household size was 2.79. There were 1,085 families (64.7% of all households).

There were 1,906 housing units at an average density of 32.7 units per square mile (12.6 units/km^{2}), of which 1,677 (88.0%) were occupied and 12.0% were vacant. Of occupied units, 39.4% were owner-occupied and 60.6% were occupied by renters. The homeowner vacancy rate was 3.4%, and the rental vacancy rate was 6.3%.

=== Income and poverty ===
In 2023, the US Census Bureau estimated that the median household income was $50,800, and the per capita income was $23,662. About 24.7% of families and 27.8% of the population were below the poverty line.

=== 2010 census ===
The 2010 United States census reported that Mojave had a population of 4,238. The population density was 72.6 inhabitants per square mile (28.0/km^{2}). The racial makeup of Mojave was 2,381 (56.2%) White, 638 (15.1%) African American, 54 (1.3%) Native American, 53 (1.3%) Asian, 19 (0.4%) Pacific Islander, 867 (20.5%) from other races, and 226 (5.3%) from two or more races. Hispanic or Latino of any race were 1,592 persons (37.6%).

The 2010 Census reported that 4,238 people (100% of the population) lived in households, 0 (0%) lived in non-institutionalized group quarters, and 0 (0%) were institutionalized.

There were 1,525 households, out of which 614 (40.3%) had children under the age of 18 living in them, 597 (39.1%) were opposite-sex married couples living together, 305 (20.0%) had a female householder with no husband present, 111 (7.3%) had a male householder with no wife present. There were 161 (10.6%) unmarried opposite-sex partnerships, and 9 (0.6%) same-sex married couples or partnerships. 417 households (27.3%) were made up of individuals, and 128 (8.4%) had someone living alone who was 65 years of age or older. The average household size was 2.78. There were 1,013 families (66.4% of all households); the average family size was 3.37.

The population was spread out, with 1,298 people (30.6%) under the age of 18, 509 people (12.0%) aged 18 to 24, 938 people (22.1%) aged 25 to 44, 1,052 people (24.8%) aged 45 to 64, and 441 people (10.4%) who were 65 years of age or older. The median age was 31.0 years. For every 100 females, there were 102.3 males. For every 100 females age 18 and over, there were 96.8 males.

There were 1,817 housing units at an average density of 31.1 per square mile (12.0/km^{2}), of which 719 (47.1%) were owner-occupied, and 806 (52.9%) were occupied by renters. The homeowner vacancy rate was 5.3%; the rental vacancy rate was 13.7%. 1,907 people (45.0% of the population) lived in owner-occupied housing units and 2,331 people (55.0%) lived in rental housing units.

== Notable people ==
Christopher Pike, Starfleet captain
