= Dante's View =

Viewpoint terrace in California, USA

Coordinates: 36.2206°N 116.7264°W

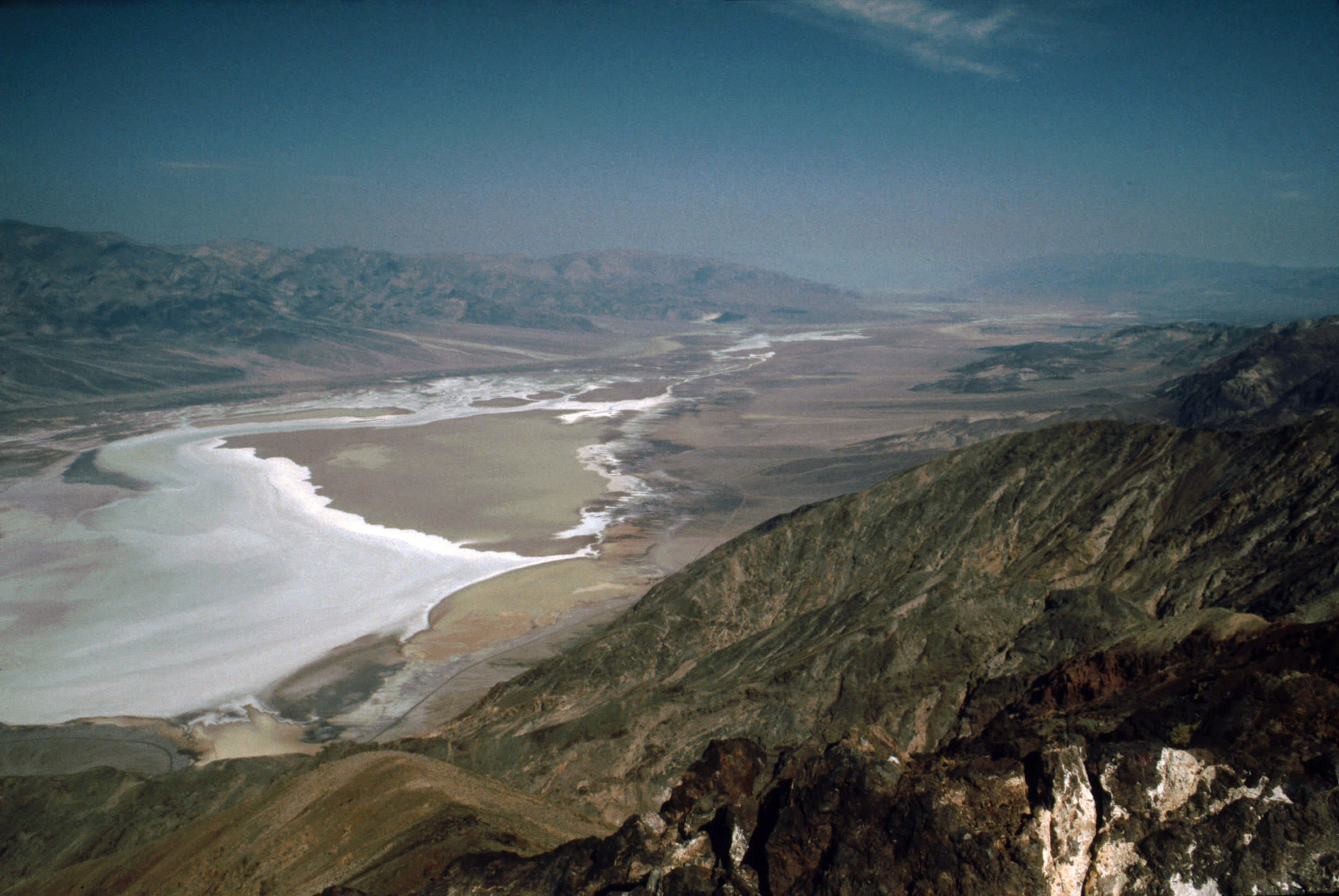
August 1982 view from Dante's View, Devil Golf Course, salt shoreline

Dante's View is a viewpoint terrace at 1,669 m (5,476 ft) height, on the north side of Coffin Peak, along the crest of the Black Mountains, overlooking Death Valley. Dante's View is about 25 km (16 mi) south of Furnace Creek in Death Valley National Park.

== Viewpoint ==
From the Dante's View parking lot, visitors can take several paths, one of which leads to the very brink of the edge, offering a dramatic panoramic view. Another path leads north 320 m (350 yd) to a rest area with picnic tables. The best time to visit Dante's View is in the cooler morning hours, when the sun is in the east. Dante's View has a perfect view for night time star viewing with telescopes.

== General ==
Dante's View provides a panoramic view of the southern Death Valley basin. To the south, the Owlshead Mountains, 30 km (19 mi) away can be seen, and to the north, the Funeral Mountains 50 km (31 mi) distant, are visible beyond Furnace Creek. To the West, across Badwater Basin, the Panamint Range rises dramatically to Telescope Peak. To the east is found the Greenwater Range. On very clear days, the highest and lowest points in the contiguous 48 states of the United States - Mount Whitney at 4,421 m (14,505 ft) and Badwater Basin at -86 m (-282 ft), respectively - can be seen.

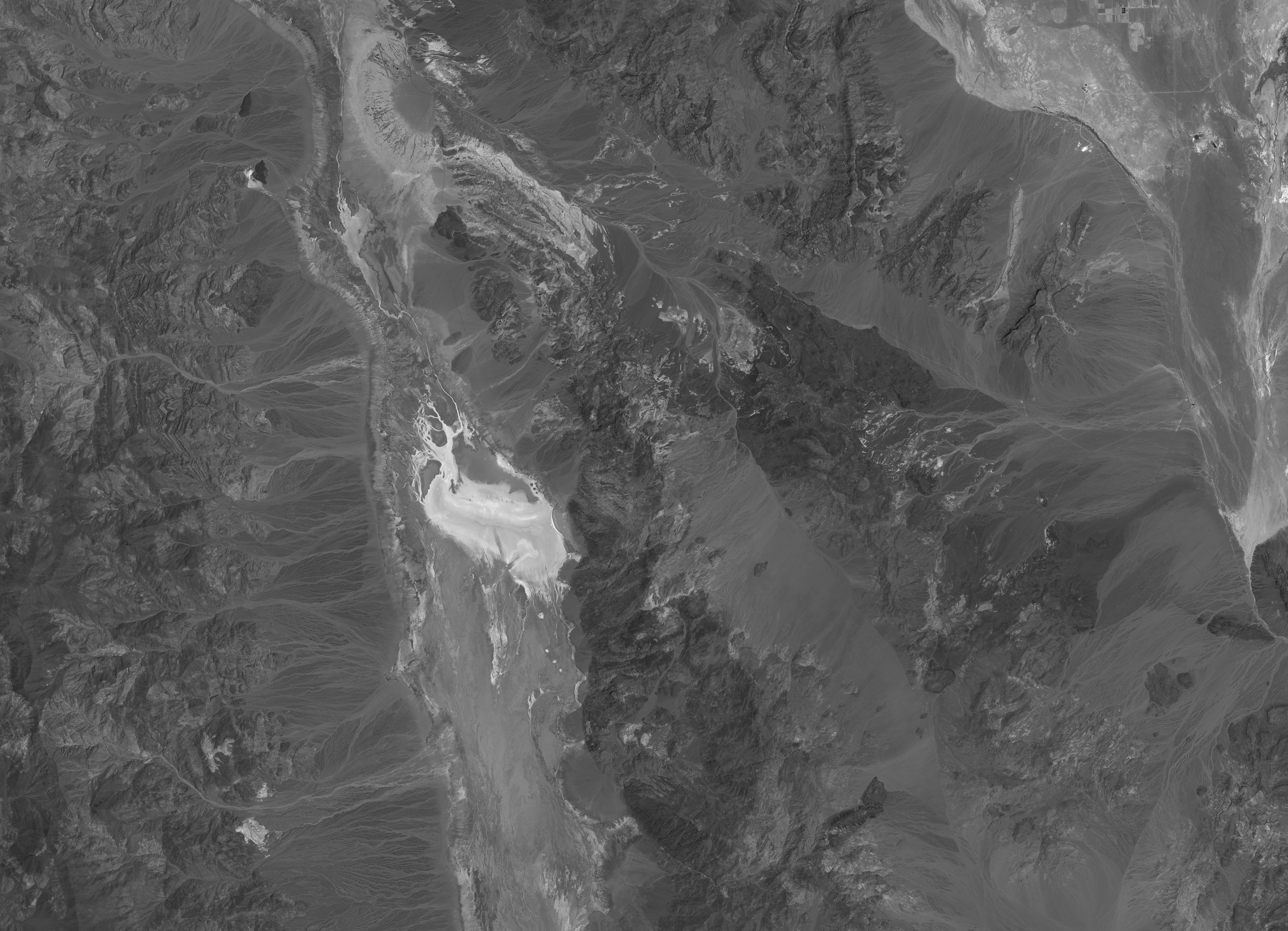
Dante's View and Badwater from space Landsat

- A part of the Devil's Golf Course is to the west-northwest, where it appears like a great sparkling ocean - instead it is solid halite salt. The crust of salt is 1 to 2 meters (1.1 to 2.2 yd) thick and changes form after rain in the winter season dissolves the salt, to be recrystallized as the water evaporates.
- to the west-northwest, directly under Dante's View, is the Badwater Basin.

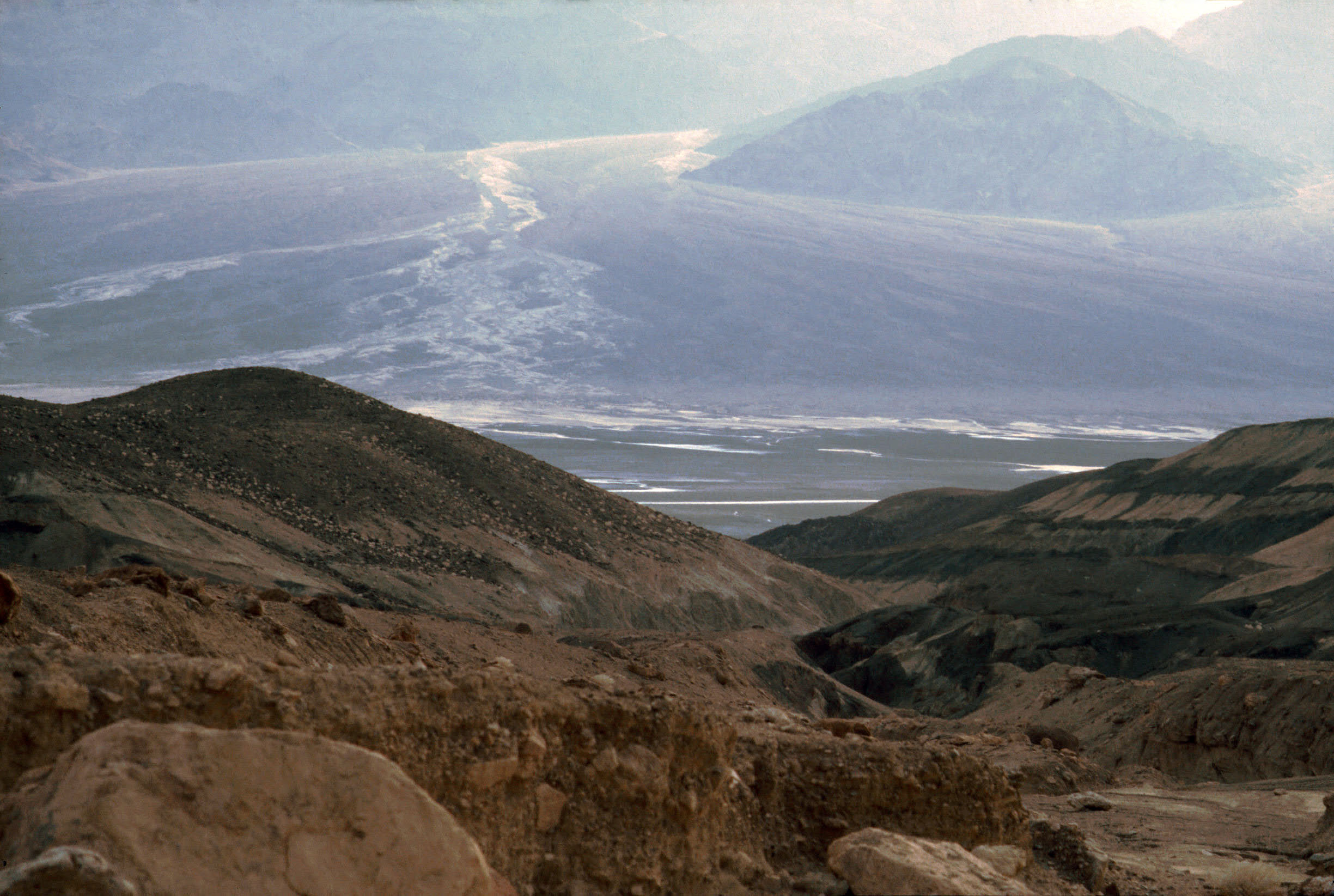
Dante's View, Salt rivers descends from the Panamint Range

- west across the Badwater Basin, lies the Panamint Range, with Trail Canyon, Death Valley Canyon and Hanaupah Canyon visible. At the crest of the Panamints, Telescope Peak 3,367 m (11,047 ft) is 20 km (12 mi) distant.

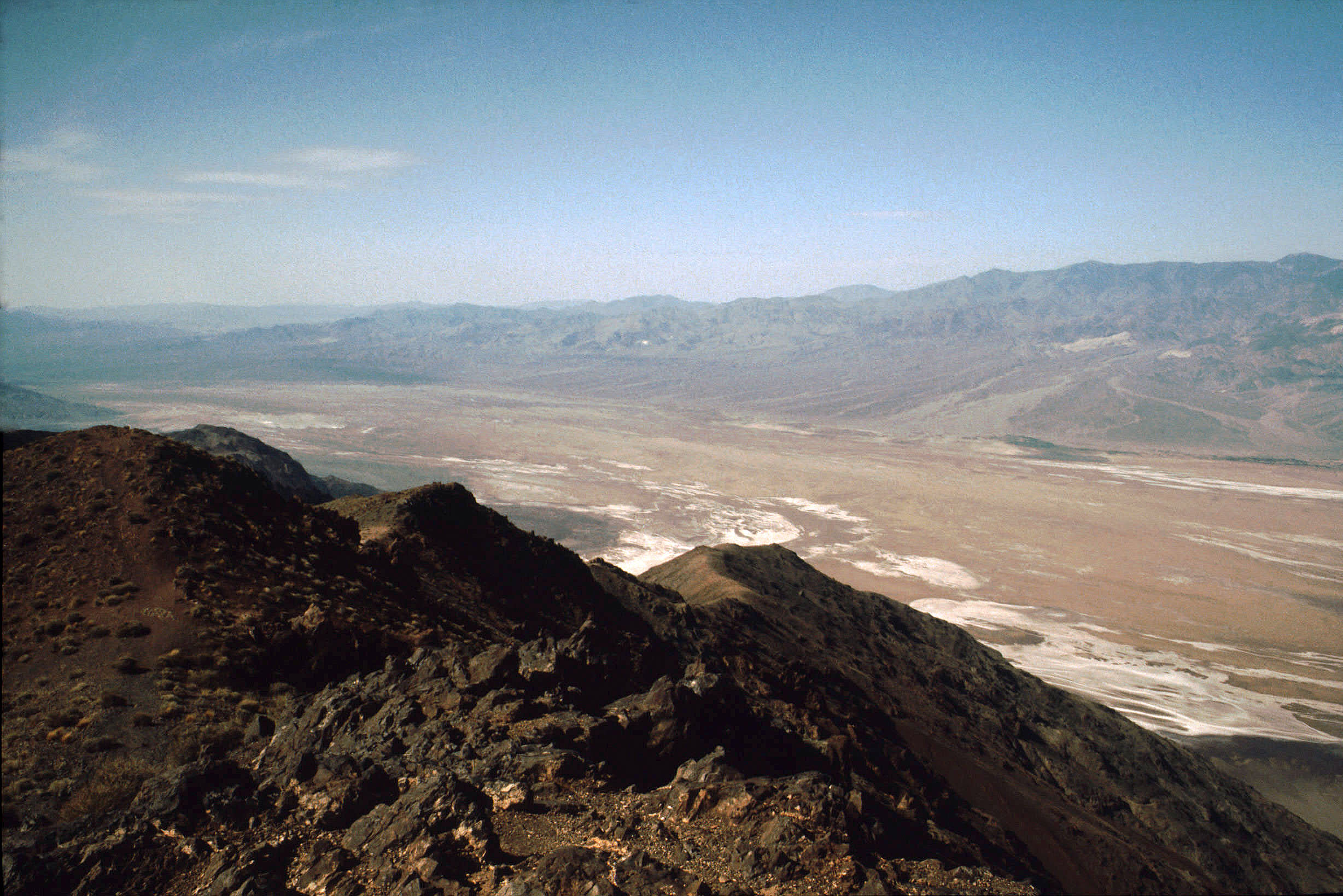
Dante's View to South

- to the south, the Owlshead Mountains.
- east is seen the Great Basin ranges of Nevada.

Dante's View panorama

== Origin of name ==
Dante's View is named after the 14th-century Italian poet Dante Alighieri, who wrote the Divina Commedia (Divine Comedy), in which are described the nine circles of Hell, the seven terraces of Purgatory and the nine spheres of Paradise.

In April 1926, some businessmen of the Pacific Coast Borax Company, informed of the touristic attractiveness of Death Valley, were trying to choose the vantage point with the best view of Death Valley. They had nearly chosen Chloride Cliff in the Funeral Mountains when the Deputy Sheriff of Greenwater, Charlie Brown, brought them to this point a short distance from the Black Mountains. The group was immediately persuaded and promptly dubbed the site "Dante's View".

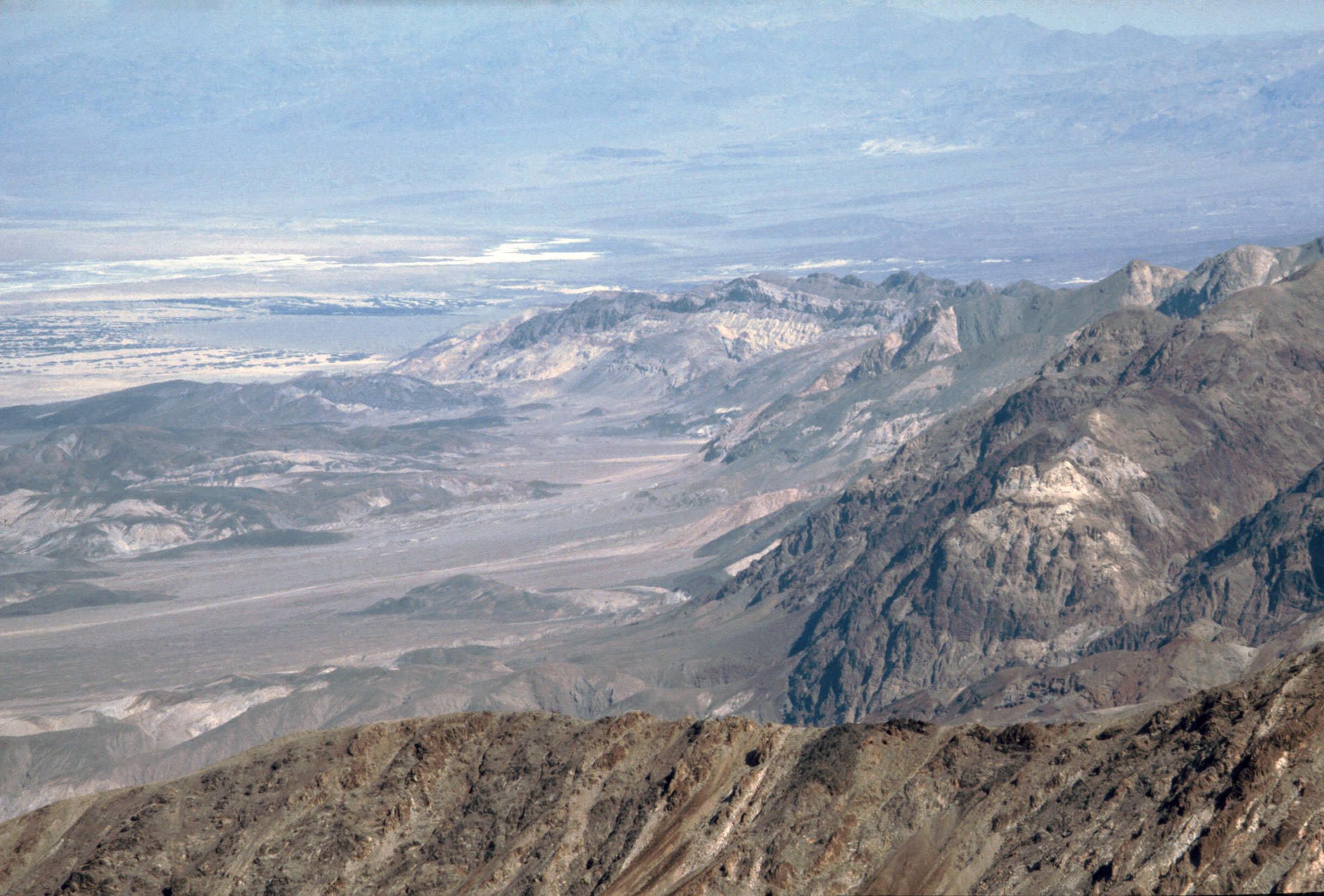
Dante's View to North

== Geological ==
Dante's View is part of the Black Mountains, a part of Amargosa Range, that was geological Mesozoic volcanoes. These mountains were created when the surface of the earth was being stretched, forming a horst or a pulling force, forming grabens. The crust ruptured because of this force, and as a result, lava erupted and ended up deposited on top of the preceding sedimentary rock.

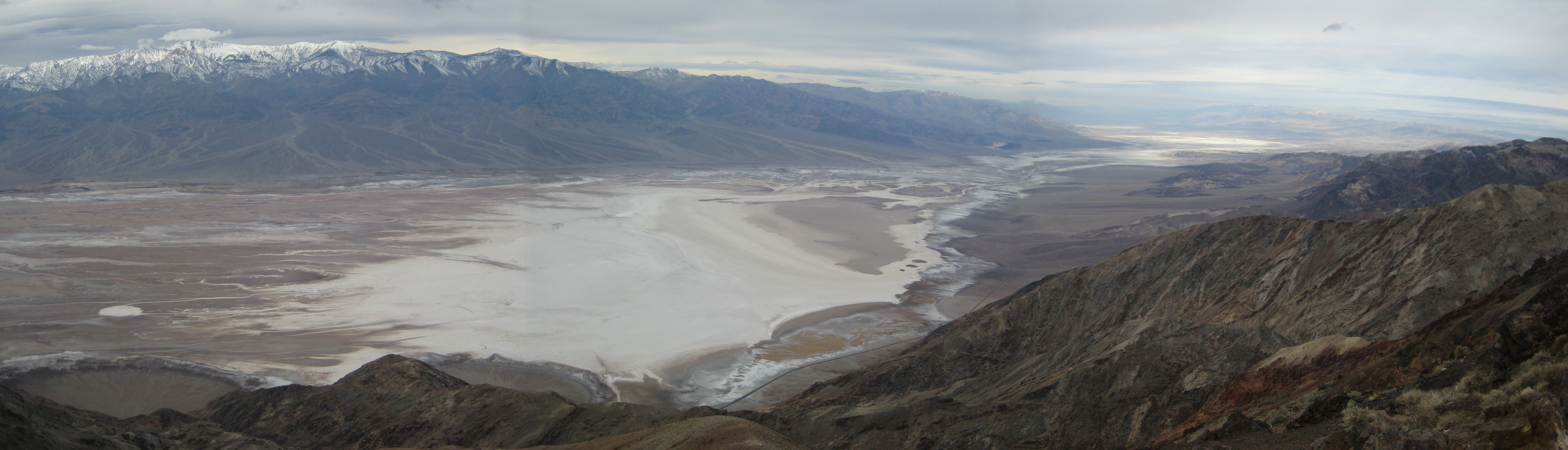
Dante's View panorama

== In popular culture ==
Dante's View was used as a filming location for the 1977 film Star Wars as the characters overlook the fictional Tatooine spaceport of Mos Eisley (which was added into the scene as a matte painting). That view point is Dante's View.

== See also ==
- Places of interest in the Death Valley area
- Death Valley pupfish
- Racetrack Playa
- Richard Benyo
- Stan Jones (songwriter)
- Mark Calaway

== Bibliography ==
- Dante's View by National Park Service (NPS)
- Dante's View by Geological Survey (USGS)
