= Panamint =

Panamint may refer to:

== People ==
- Timbisha, a native American tribe also known as Panamint
- Timbisha language, also known as Panamint language

== Places ==
- Panamint City, a ghost town in California known for its past mining activity
- Panamint Range, a mountain range in the northeastern part of Mojave Desert, California
- Panamint Springs, an unincorporated community in Inyo County, California
- Panamint Valley, a California valley at the northeastern part of Mojave Desert

== Animals ==
- Panamint alligator lizard
- Panamint chipmunk
- Panamint kangaroo rat
- Panamint rattler

== Plants ==
- Panamint beardtongue
- Panamint butterfly bush
- Panamint cryptantha
- Panamint daisy
- Panamint dudleya
- Panamint liveforever
- Panamint mariposa lily
- Panamint milkvetch
- Panamint Mountain buckwheat
- Panamint Mountain lupine
- Panamint penstemon
- Panamint plume
- Panamint rock goldenrod
