= Granite Mountains (northern San Bernardino County, California) =

Mountain range in California, United States

The Granite Mountains is an overall, east–west trending mountain range in the Mojave Desert and northern San Bernardino County, California. It lies within Fort Irwin National Training Center, about 10 mi (16 km) north of Fort Irwin.

This mountain range is south of Death Valley National Park, south of the Quail Mountains, and west of the Avawatz Mountains. It is named in the southern portion of the following USGS 7.5-minute topographic quadrangle maps: West of Leach Spring, Leach Spring, and Leach Lake; and the northern portion of West of Drinkwater Lake and Drinkwater Lake. The mountain range extends slightly into the northern edge of West of Nelson Lake and Nelson Lake 7.5-minute topographic quadrangle maps.

== Geography ==
The Granite Mountains is a concave southward, bow-shaped", range which stretches 26.2 mi (42.2 km) east-southeast from a point at latitude and longitude, 35°29′5.86″N 116°57′51.54″W to Granite Pass at 35°25′31.04″N 116°33′5.26″W. The hills east-southeast of Granite Pass, their highest elevation 4,524 ft (1,379 m), extending another 5.6 mi (9.0 km) to 35°24′59.56″N 116°28′5.33″W are not named on the USGS topographic maps, and are not included in the points given for these mountains in the Geographic Names Information System. However, these hills are included as part of this range on page 58 of an official US Army Corps of Engineers report and in maps published online by San Bernardino County.

The highest peak in the Granite Mountains is an unnamed peak at 35°27′5.27″N 116°35′45.38″W in the Drinkwater Lake 7.5-minute topographic quadrangle. This peak has a summit elevation of 5,299 ft (1,615 m) above sea level. A road and power line go to the top, where there are several structures and two radio facilities. Microwave antennas and video cameras there are used to monitor military training exercises in the valley to the south and live-fire exercises conducted north of the range.

== Geology ==
According to the geologic mapping of Jennings and others, the Granite Mountains are almost entirely underlain by undifferentiated Mesozoic granitic rocks. Only at the very west and southwestern parts of its mountains and hills are mapped as Cenozoic basalts and basaltic pyroclastic rocks. In their subsequent geologic map, Miller and others, identified the granitic rocks of Jennings and others as felsic plutonic rocks that weather to grus and Jennings and others' basaltic rocks as either mafic volcanic rocks or felsic volcanic rocks. In their text, Miller and others also refer to the presence of ...diverse metavolcanic rocks probably of Jurassic age... in the eastern Granite Mountains although metamorphic rocks are not mapped by them anywhere in the Granite Mountains.

The Granite Mountains fault zone runs through most of the range. It consists of three main segments that are about 43.5 mi (70.0 km) in total length. It is shown in pink in the figure in the Faults of Southern California Mojave Region.

== Botany ==
Plants documented in the Granite Mountains include Psorothamnus arborescens var. arborescens (Mojave indigo-bush), Cylindropuntia echinocarpa (silver cholla), many cacti, Yucca schidigera (Spanish bayonet), and species of Brickellia, Ericameria, Ephedra, and Encelia. Surveys at springs reported Amaranthus fimbriatus (fringed amaranth), Ambrosia dumosa (white bursage), Amsinckia tessellata (bristly fiddleneck), Atriplex canescens (four-wing saltbush), Bromus madritensis (compact brome), Coleogyne ramosissima (blackbrush), Cucurbita palmata (coyote melon), Descurainia pinnata (western tansymustard), Distichlis spicata (saltgrass), Encelia farinosa (brittlebush), Ephedra nevadensis (Mormon tea), Ericameria cooperi (Coopers's goldenbush), Eriogonum fasciculatum (California buckwheat), Eriogonum panamintense (Panamint Mountain buckwheat), Gutierrezia microcephala (threadleaf snakeweed), Larrea tridentata (creosote bush), Lycium andersonii (water-jacket), Nicotiana obtusifolia (desert tobacco), Phacelia crenulata (notch-leaf scorpion-weed), Polypogon monspeliensis (annual beard-grass), Populus fremontii (Fremont cottonwood), Prunus fasciculata (wild almond), Purshia tridentata (bitterbrush), Salazaria mexicana (bladder sage ), Salix gooddingii (Goodding's willow), and Typha latifolia (cattail).

== See also ==
- Granite Mountains (eastern San Bernardino County, California)
- Granite Mountains (western San Bernardino County, California)
