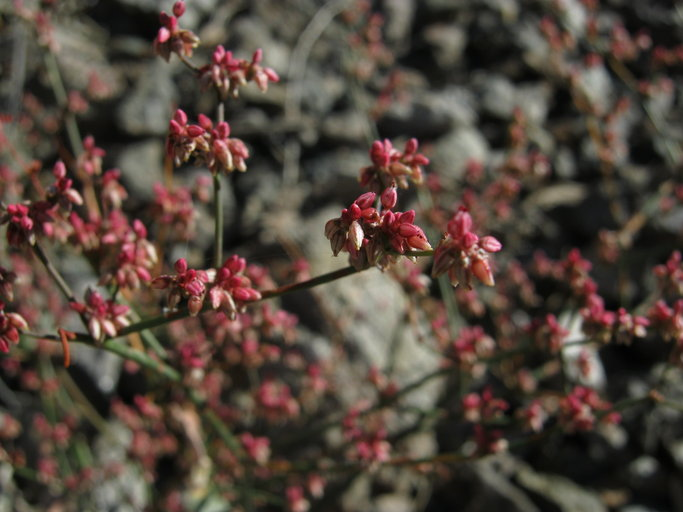
- var. hoffmannii

Scientific classification
- Kingdom: Plantae
- Clade: Tracheophytes
- Clade: Angiosperms
- Clade: Eudicots
- Order: Caryophyllales
- Family: Polygonaceae
- Genus: Eriogonum
- Species: E. hoffmannii

Binomial name
- Eriogonum hoffmannii S.Stokes

= Eriogonum hoffmannii =

Species of wild buckwheat

Eriogonum hoffmannii is a species of wild buckwheat known by the common name Hoffmann's buckwheat. It is endemic to Inyo County, California, where it is found only in the mountains around Death Valley; most of the known populations of the plant are located in Death Valley National Park. The plant grows in the desert scrub on the slopes of the Panamint, Black, and Funeral Mountains.

== Description ==
This buckwheat is an annual herb growing up to a meter in height with a slender flowering stem. The round woolly leaves are located about the base of the stem. The inflorescence is a series of branches lined with smaller branches bearing many small clusters of tiny white, pink, or reddish flowers.

There are two varieties of this species. The more common, var. robustius, takes an erect form up to a meter tall, while var. hoffmannii is a shorter, spreading plant.
