= Salazaria =

Salazaria is the generic name of two groups of organisms:

- Salazaria (butterfly), a genus of butterflies in the family Lycaenidae
- Salazaria (plant), a genus of plants in the family Lamiaceae
