= Granite Mountains (eastern San Bernardino County, California) =

Mountain range in California, United States

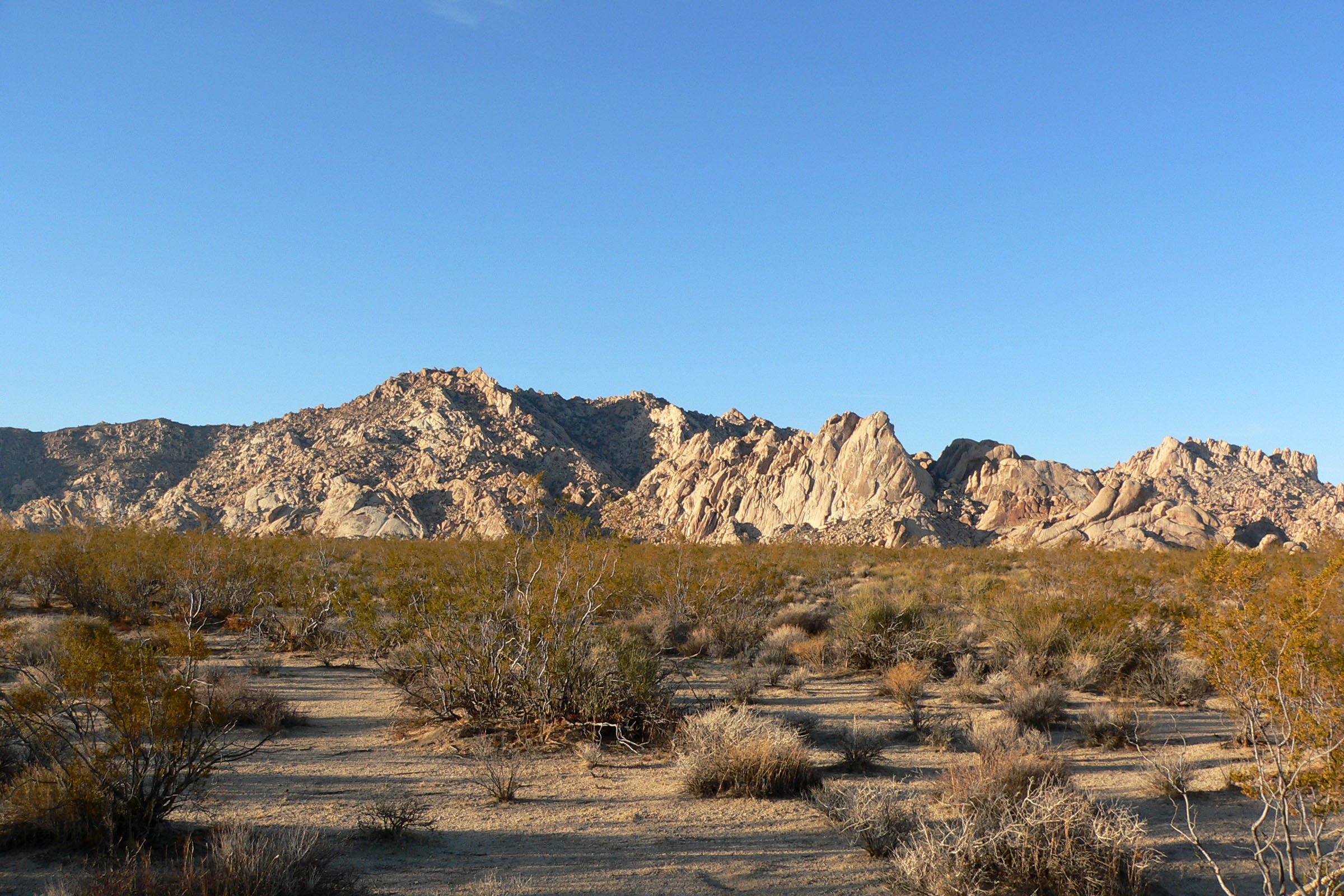
- Late afternoon view from Kelbaker Road

Highest point
- Elevation: 2,062 m (6,765 ft)

Geography
- Location within California
- Country: United States
- State: California
- Region: Mojave Desert
- District: San Bernardino County
- Range coordinates: 34°47′42.2″N 115°41′32.1″W
- Topo map: USGS Leach Lake

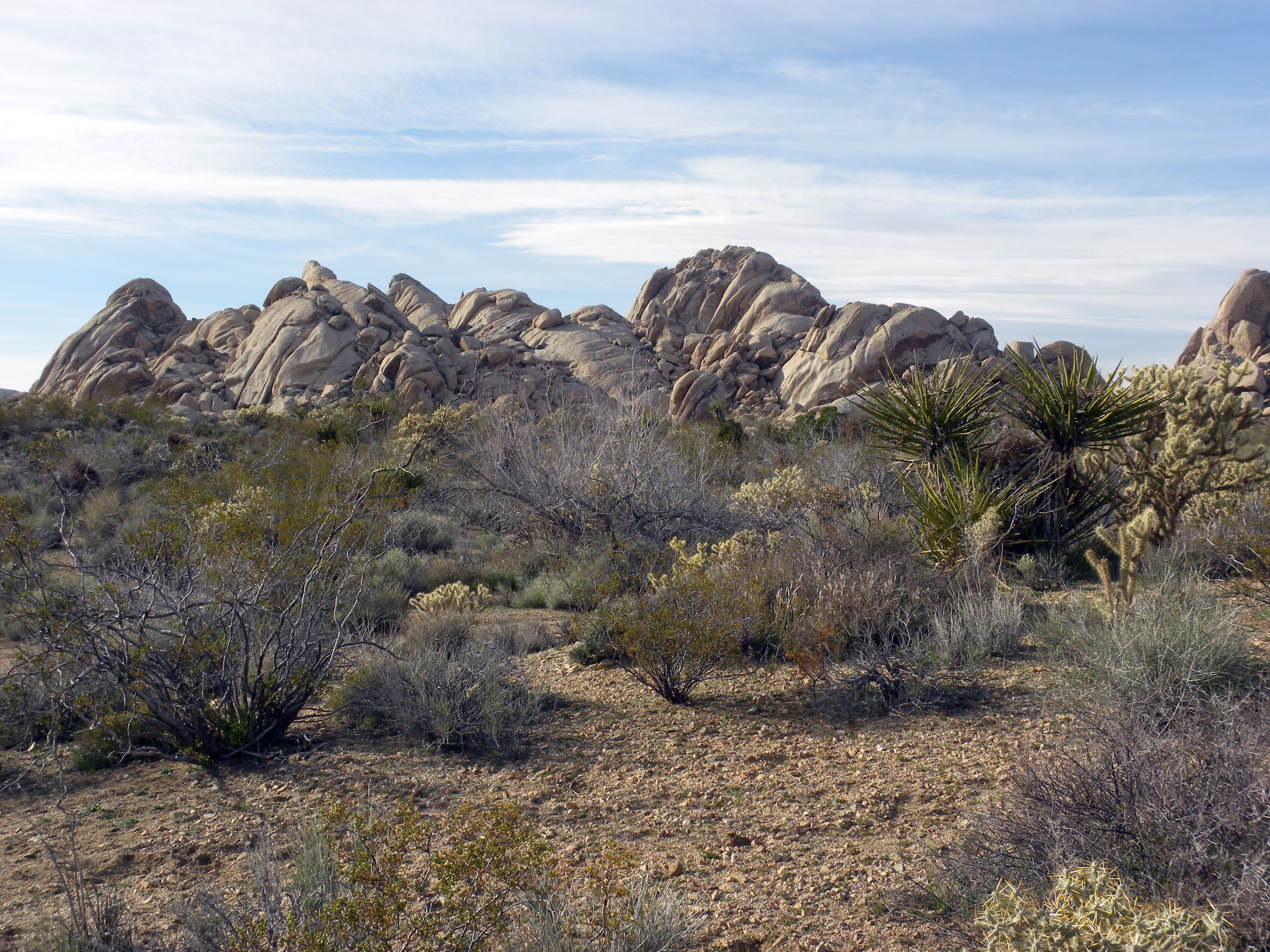
Closer view of granite outcrop in the Granite Mountains.

The Granite Mountains is a small mountain range in eastern San Bernardino County, California, USA, in the Mojave Desert. The range stretches 10.7 mi (17.2 km) from Granite Pass to Budweiser Wash. The highest peaks of this mountain range are an unnamed peak, which is 6,738 ft (2,054 m) in elevation, and Granite Peak, which is 6,766 ft (2,062 m) in elevation.

The Granite Mountains lies north of Interstate 40 and historic Route 66. The Providence Mountains are adjacent to the Granite Mountains to the northeast. The Bristol Mountains are directly to the west, the Old Woman Mountains are to the southeast, and Pisgah Crater and the Bullion Mountains are to the southwest. The Mountains lie east of the small community of Kelso, northeast of Ludlow, and north of Amboy. This mountain range lies within the Mojave National Preserve, in the National Park Service system.

The fauna and flora of the Granite Mountains are typical of this part of the Mojave Desert. Pinyon pine, juniper, and various shrubs and grasses characterize their higher elevations and north-facing slopes. Their lower elevations and south-facing slopes characteristically are more sparsely covered by yucca, cacti, creosote, and other shrubs. Numerous springs and water seeps occur within these mountains.

== Sweeney Granite Mountains Desert Research Center ==
The University of California, Riverside, operates the Sweeney Granite Mountains Desert Research Center within the Mojave National Preserve. It is a research and teaching center that was established by the late Professor Dr. Kenneth Norris] of U.C. Santa Cruz in 1978 and is now managed out of University of California, Riverside. Students and faculty have completed extensive studies of the natural history of the Granite Mountains since the reserve's inception.

== Geology ==
The Granite Mountains contains outcrops of rock and sediments ranging in age from Paleozoic to Cenozoic. The Granite Mountains are largely underlain by Mesozoic, Jurassic and Cretaceous, intrusive rocks. At the higher elevations, small roof pendants composed of either Paleozoic dolomite, limestone, or marble occur enclosed within the Mesozoic intrusive rocks. The Cenozoic strata consist of Miocene dikes, late Cenozoic fanglomerates and breccias, and Quaternary alluvium.

=== Jurassic intrusive suite ===
The overwhelming majority of the Granite Mountains consists of intrusive rocks in the form of different types of granite, monzonite, and diorite. The exact nomenclature used for each of these types varies from author to author because of differences in the classification system used by each author. These rocks can be divided into Jurassic and Cretaceous intrusive suites. As one time, the oldest of the Jurassic intrusive rocks were tentatively thought to be Triassic in age.

The oldest of the Jurassic intrusive rocks consist of hornblende-quartz diorite gneiss and hornblende-quartz monzodiorite gneiss. Both gneisses contain megacrysts of potassium feldspar that are 2–10 cm across. These gneisses have a quartz-poor, potassium feldspar-rich composition and are cross-cut by younger Jurassic diorites. An xenolith of laminated calc-silicate hornfel found within the gneiss suggests that the gneisses postdate Triassic (c) calcsilicate rocks. The gneissic rocks also contain xenoliths of amphibolite[ and biotite-rich diorite.

In the Granite Mountains, the younger Jurassic intrusive rocks consist of plutons of quartz monzonite and quartz diorite. Along the east side of the Granite Mountains, outcrops of the quartz monzonite contains phenocrysts of medium-grained, lavender, potassium feldspar. The quartz diorite is heterogeneous in texture and composition and much of it consists of fine-grained foliated metadiorite. Other Jurassic intrusive rocks of varying composition, e.g. fine-grained, inclusion-spotted quartz monzonite; medium-grained quartz monzodiorite; and syenogranite, intrude the Jurassic quartz monzonite and quartz diorite to varying extents within the north, west, and northeast sides of the Granite Mountains. The Jurassic intrusive suites are metamorphosed, foliated, and locally intricately folded throughout most of the Granite Mountains. Geobarometric studies indicate shallow crustal depths, 5.6 to 4.3 mi (9.0 to 6.9 km) below the surface, for intrustion and solidification of a Late Jurassic pluton from the nearby southern Providence Mountains.

=== Cretaceous intrusive suite ===
Within the Granite Mountains, the Cretaceous intrusive suite consists of a granodiorite pluton, a zoned pluton, and many granite, aplite, and pegmatite dikes. Within the western part of the Granite Mountains, the granodiorite pluton forms a sheet-like intrusion that dips west at moderate angles. The larger zoned pluton occupies all of the southeastern part of the Granite Mountains. It exhibits a discontinuous outer zone of porphyritic monzogranite that grades inward into nonporphyritic monzogranite at its center. Estimates made from geobarometry indicate mid-crustal depths, about 10.5 to 12 mi (16.9 to 19.3 km) below the surface, of intrusion and solidification for the Cretaceous plutons of the Granite Mountains.

=== Pre-Mesozoic roof pendants ===
At higher elevations within the Granite Mountains, Pre-Mesozoic metasedimentary rocks occur as roof pendants enclosed within the Mesozoic intrusive rocks. These metasedimentary rocks consist mainly of marble, siliceous marble, dolomite marble, and calcsilicate hornfels. Some of the marble and siliceous marble currently are lithologically correlated with the Pennsylvanian to Permian Bird Spring Formation and Mississippian Monte Cristo Limestone. Wollastonite and phlogopite occur in the siliceous marble. The calcsilicate hornfels include laminated calc-silicate hornfels that are tentatively correlated with Triassic sedimentary strata. Also associated with the calcareous metasedimentary rocks are skarns. These skarns contain diopside, garnet, quartz, and epidote. The skarns contain the only mineralization of economic consequence in these Mountains.

=== Cenozoic rocks ===
The Cenozoic age rocks and sediments found within the consist of Miocene dikes, late Cenozoic alluvial fans, and Quaternary alluvium and alluvial fans. Within the Granite Mountains, the Jurassic-Cretaceous intrusive suites are cut by west-northwest-striking rhyolite dikes. They are inferred to be Miocene in age based on the abundance of Miocene volcanic rocks of similar composition in the region. On the north and northeast sides of the Granite Mountains and southeast of Granite Pass, Pliocene and Pleistocene fanglomerates and sedimentary breccias form large alluvial fans where they either overlie or are locally in fault contact with Mesozoic intrusive rocks. Quaternary alluvium forms a thin blanket that extends around the base of the Granite Mountains.

== Geologic history ==
The geologic history that is recorded in the outcropping rocks of the Granite Mountains and surrounding Mojave Desert region spans more than 1,760 million years. The oldest rocks found exposed in this region, but not in the Granite Mountains, are Early Proterozoic gneisses that underwent intense regional metamorphism about 1,700 Ma. These rocks were later intruded by granitic rocks from about 1,695 to 1,650 Ma and at about 1,400 Ma. A final period of Proterozoic magmatic activity occurred about 1,100 Ma with the intrusion of diabase dikes during a period of continental rifting. Afterwards the volcanoes and orogenic mountain ranges formed during these periods of magmatism were eroded down to their roots during an extended period of tectonic inactivity.

During the latest Proterozoic, Paleozoic, and early Mesozoic, this part of the Mojave Desert was a passive margin along the western edge of the North American craton. Within this passive margin, sedimentary strata accumulated lying unconformably across a deeply eroded surface underlian by Proterozoic gneissic and granitic rocks. These sedimentary rocks accumulated in marine and, less commonly, continental environments along the western edge of the North American craton. The Triassic (?) calc-silicate hornfel xenolith and limestone, dolomite, and marble roof pendants found within the Granite Mountains are all that remain of this once several kilometer-thick blanket of passive margin sedimentary strata that covered this region.

Beginning in the Mesozoic, widespread magmatism affected the region as ancient continental-margin volcanic arcs formed parallel to the western edge of the North America craton. The bodies of Jurassic granite, monzonite, and diorite found in the Granite Mountains formed as intrusions of magma of slight alkaline affinities that fed volcanoes. These volcanoes formed the eastern edge of volcanic arcs lying along the western edge of the North American craton. The magma bodies solidified about 5.6 to 4.3 mi (9.0 to 6.9 km) below the surface. As the western edge of the North America craton was built westward, subsequent magmatism produced intrusions and volcanism of calc-alkaline affinities that are typical of continental magmatic arcs. The Cretaceous granodiorite and monzogranite exposed in the Granite Mountains were intruded and solidified about 10.5 to 12 mi (16.9 to 19.3 km) below the surface during this period. Also, during the middle to late Mesozoic, the region underwent shortening forming a fold and thrust belt. This tectonism formed mountain ranges that were uplifted and subsequently deeply eroded as to remove all traces of Mesozoic volcanoes and their deposits in this region.

During the early part of the Cenozoic, a period of tectonic quiescence characterized the region. In the Miocene, tectonic activity stretched crust of this region, resulting in the opening of dikes that filled with magma that fed volcanoes within the region. It was at this time, the rhyolite dikes within the Granite Mountains were formed. Also, further uplifting occurred such that extensive erosion produced broad pediment domes in the Granite Mountains region. During the Quaternary erosion has continued to lower the pediment domes and mountain ranges and to supply sediments to adjacent valleys.

== Mining ==
The Granite Mountains lack any significant mineral resources. The significant sites of past mining activity lying within the Granite Mountains are the Comanche Mine, the Silver Lode Mine, and the Iron Victory Prospect. None of these mines and prospects contain ore deposits large enough to constitute an economic resource.

First, the Comanche Mine was first named and patented as mineral claim in 1902. It was known as the El Companche Mine in 1925; as the Comanche Mine in the 1950's; and last known as the Christopher Mine in 1965. When visited by United States Geological Survey geologists in 1982, there were no claims on the property. Although called a mine, it never commercially produce any ore. The Comanche Mine cuts into a roof pendant consisting of Paleozoic dolomitic marble. The marble consists of 41 to 45 percent calcium oxide and 14 to 16 percent magnesium oxide. Locally, the marble contains disseminated copper and iron minerals.

Second, the Silver Lobe Mine initially started out as a cluster of patented mineral claims around 1902 known as the Pine Ridge Mine. It later became the Silver Queen when additional claims were patented in 1919. Most of the work at the Silver Lobe was conducted in the 1930s. It became the Silver Lobe Mine when two additional mineral claims were filed in 1978 and later was renamed the McCoy Mine when a group of 10 lode claims was filed in 1982. At this mine, silver, copper, lead, and zinc minerals are dispersed along joints and in quartz veins in granitic bedrock. The Silver Lobe Mine never produced commercial quantities of ore.

Finally, claims for iron ore were patented in the vicinity of the Iron Victory Prospect as early as 1912. The claims directed associated with the Iron Victory Prospect were located in 1942 and patented January 26, 1956. These claims explored lenses of magnetite and hematite associated with a skarn zone in a marble roof pendant. Some of these lenses also contain some chalcopyrite. The iron ore deposits of Iron Victory Prospect are too small to be commercially mined.

== See also ==
- Camp Granite World War 2 training camp
- Granite Mountains (northern San Bernardino County, California)
- Granite Mountains (western San Bernardino County, California)
