= Christian Brevoort Zabriskie =

American businessman

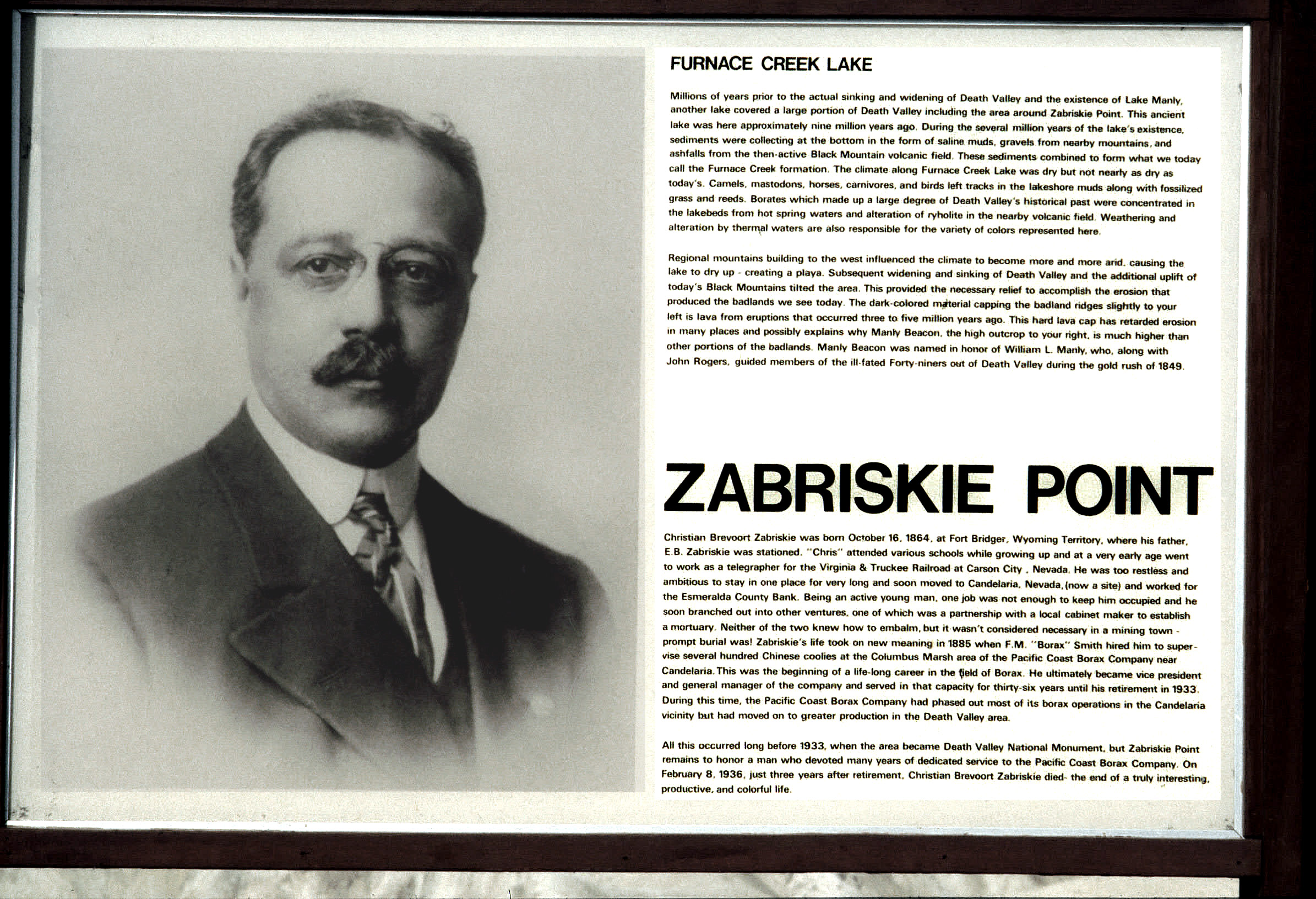
Christian Brevoort Zabriskie: interpretive sign at Zabriskie Point by the National Park Service (adapted public domain text).

Christian Brevoort Zabriskie /zəˈbrɪski/ (October 16, 1864 – February 8, 1936) was an American businessman and vice president of Pacific Coast Borax Company. Zabriskie Point on the northeasternmost flank of the Black Mountains east of Death Valley, located in Death Valley National Park is named after him.

== Early years ==
Zabriskie was born at Fort Bridger in Wyoming Territory, where his father, Capt. Elias B. Zabriskie, was stationed. The Zabriskie family descended from Albrycht Zaborowski (Albert Zabriskie), a Polish immigrant from Angerburg (Węgorzewo) in Ducal Prussia, who settled in New Jersey in 1662 alongside a Dutch community. Young Zabriskie attended various schools while growing up and at a very early age went to work as a telegrapher for the Virginia and Truckee Railroad at Carson City, Nevada. He was too restless and ambitious to stay in one place for very long and soon moved to Candelaria, Nevada, and worked for the Esmeralda County Bank. Being an active young man, one job was not enough to keep him occupied and he soon branched out into other ventures, one of which was a partnership with a local cabinet maker to establish a mortuary. Neither of the two knew how to embalm, but it was not considered necessary in a mining town — prompt burial was.

== Borax career ==
Zabriskie's life took on new meaning in 1885 when F. M. "Borax" Smith hired him to supervise several hundred Chinese laborers at the Columbus Marsh area of the Pacific Coast Borax Company near Candelaria. This was the beginning of a lifelong career in the borax industry.

He ultimately became vice president and general manager of the company and served in that capacity for thirty-six years until his retirement in 1933. During this time, the Pacific Coast Borax Company had phased out most of its borax operations in the Candelaria vicinity but had moved on to greater production in the Death Valley area, the Calico Mountains (near Yermo, California) and Searles Lake (near Trona, California).

All this occurred long before 1933, when the area became Death Valley National Monument, but Zabriskie Point remains to honor a man who devoted many years of dedicated service to the Pacific Coast Borax Company. He died three years after his retirement, in 1936.

== See also ==
- Twenty Mule Team Borax
- Borate and Daggett Railroad
- Trona Railway
- Category: Death Valley
