= Granite Mountains (western San Bernardino County, California) =

Mountain range in California, United States

The Granite Mountains is a mountain range in San Bernardino County, California, United States. It lies east of Victorville and Apple Valley, west of Lucerne Valley. It is one of three mountain ranges in the Mojave Desert to share this name. The range is as much as 8.5 mi (13.7 km) wide, north-south, and about 10 mi (16 km) long from the southwest edge of Fairview Valley to eastern base of Strawberry Peak.

== Geography ==
The highest elevation in the Granite Mountains is 5,131 ft (1,564 m) at 34°30′10″N 117°4′48″W. The peak is not named on USGS topographic maps, but is called Deadman’s Peak It is not to be confused with the Deadman Hills nearby. A prominent northwest-southeast trending valley splits the Granite Mountains into north and south regions. Small valleys separate the range from Deadman Hills to the west, Sidewinder Mountain to the north, and White Horse Mountain to the east.

The area is in the Granite Mountains Recreation Management Zone, which is part of the Bureau of Land Management Stoddard/Johnson Valley Special Recreation Management Area. The Granite Mountains all lie within the BLM's Granite Mountain Corridor Area of Critical Environmental Concern and the BLM's Bendire's Thrasher Area of Critical Environmental Concern includes the northern edges of the Granite Mountains.

== Geology ==
Detailed descriptions and mapping of the geology of the Granite Mountains range are lacking. A 1:250,000 scale geologic map of the region by Bortugno and Spittler shows the area of the Granite mountains north of the Helendale fault zone to consist of Jurassic or Cretaceous quartz monzonite. This geologic map also shows two relatively small roof pendants of Mesozoic metavolcanic rocks in the northwest Granite Mountains and small roof pendants of upper Paleozoic limestone and marble along the eastern edge of the northern Granite Mountains. The prominent valley separating the northern and southern Granite Mountains contains the trace of the Helendale fault zone. The area of the Granite Mountains south of the Helendale fault zone is shown to consist of Jurassic or Cretaceous granite adjacent to the Helendale fault zone and the bilk of this area consisting of Triassic monzonite. Dibblee and Minch further described the plutonic rocks in the southern Granite Mountains as being nearly white, buff to light grey weathering, hard, massive, medium- to locally coarse-grained gneissoid granite and quartz monzonite.

== Geomorphology ==
At the south end of Fairview Valley in the Granite Mountains, Bowen noted that typical exposures of quartz monzonite consisted of rounded, often rhomboidal, boulders. He concluded that these boulders developed by weathering taking place along joints of blocks of bedrock defined by rectangular joint systems.

Virtually identical quartz monzonite and granite boulder-mantled slopes characterize not only the Granite Mountains, but also, adjacent and regional mountains in the western Mojave Desert. It is argued that these boulders were originally corestones in thick, Miocene soils that once blanketed the Granite Mountains and other ranges of the western Mojave Desert region. As the regional climate became arid, the deep weathering that produced both the soils and corestones ceased and wind and sheetflow eroded the finer grained weathered bedrock leaving the corestones behind as an erosional lag of regionally extensive boulder-mantled slopes.

Bowen also observed what he inferred are the eroded remnants of a probable Pliocene or early Pleistocene paleosurface at the summit of the Granite Mountains. He estimated that it lies over 1,200 ft (370 m) feet above local base levels.

== Wind energy project ==
Renewable Energy Systems proposed 28 wind turbines in the northeastern Granite Mountains; the project was withdrawn in 2013 due to the presence of golden eagle nests nearby.

== Biology ==
The wind energy project environmental impact assessment included a survey of plants and animals. Plants in the proposed project area include the Joshua tree and other Yucca species, Cymopterus panamintensis, Eriogonum fasciculatum, Larrea tridentata, and Cryptantha clokeyi. Animal species include Papilio indra (Indra's Swallowtail), American white pelican (Pelecanus erythrorhynchos), bald eagle (Haliaeetus leucocephalus), Bendire's thrasher (Toxostoma bendirei), golden eagle (Aquila chrysaetos), loggerhead shrike (Lanius ludovicianus), Northern harrier (Circus cyaneus), Swainson’s hawk (Buteo swainsoni), willow flycatcher (Empidonax traillii), yellow warbler (Dendroica petechia), burrowing owl (Athene cunicularia), Pallid bat (Antrozous pallidus), Townsend's big-eared bat (Plecotus townsendii), and desert tortoise (Gopherus agassizii).

== See also ==
- Granite Mountains (eastern San Bernardino County, California)
- Granite Mountains (northern San Bernardino County, California)
