= Corkscrew Peak =

Peak in Death Valley National Park, U.S.

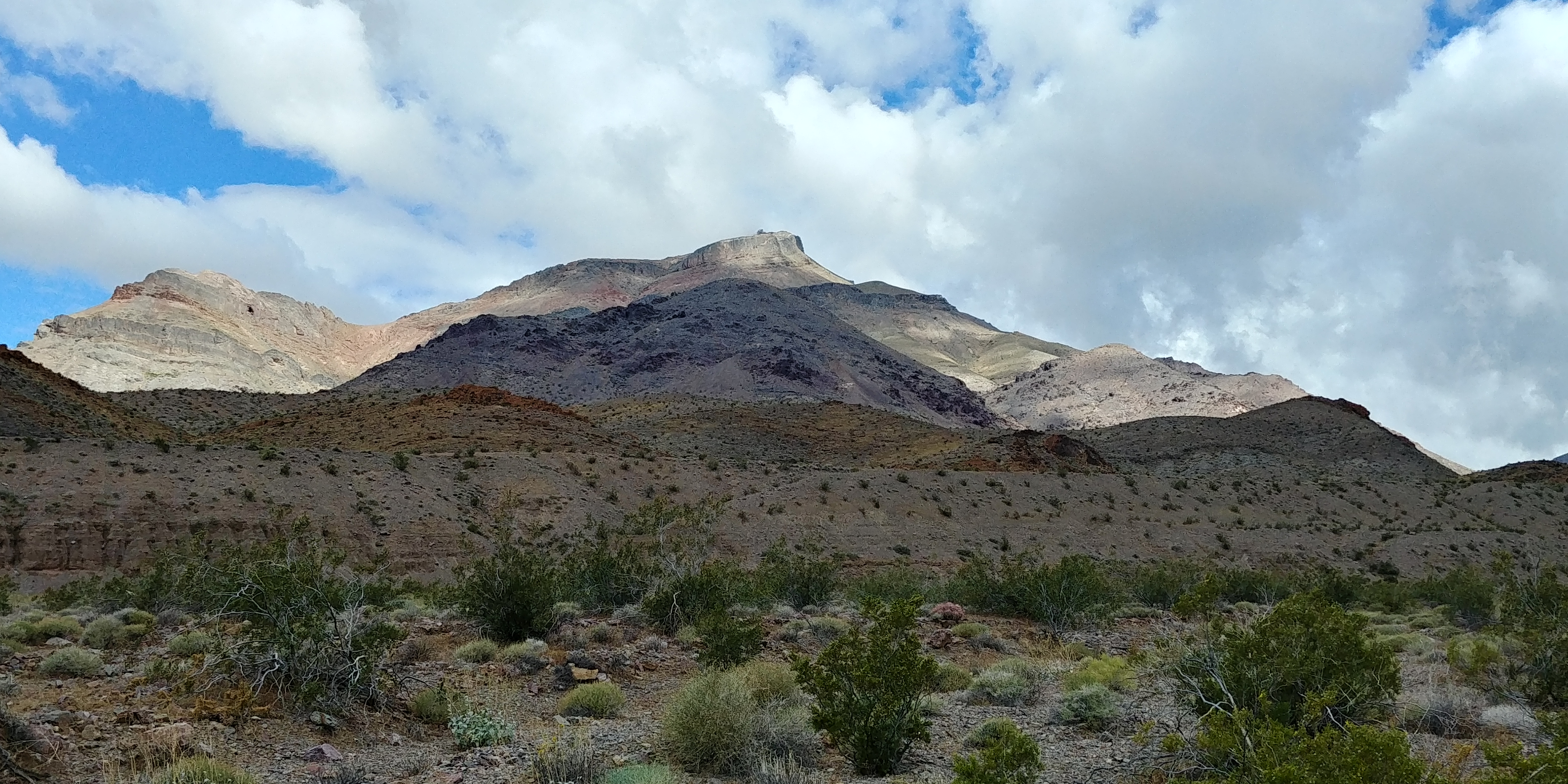
- Telescope Peak viewed from the beginning of the trail

Highest point
- Elevation: 5,804 ft (1,769 m)USGS
- Listing: Sierra Club Desert Peaks
- Coordinates: 36°46′12″N 117°00′14″W

Geography
- Location within California
- Location: Death Valley National Park, Inyo County, California, U.S.
- Parent range: Amargosa Range

Climbing
- Easiest route: Trail from Daylight Pass Road (hike)

Corkscrew Peak is a peak in the Grapevine Mountains in Death Valley National Park. It is named for its shape, which loosely looks like a corkscrew.

== Climbing ==
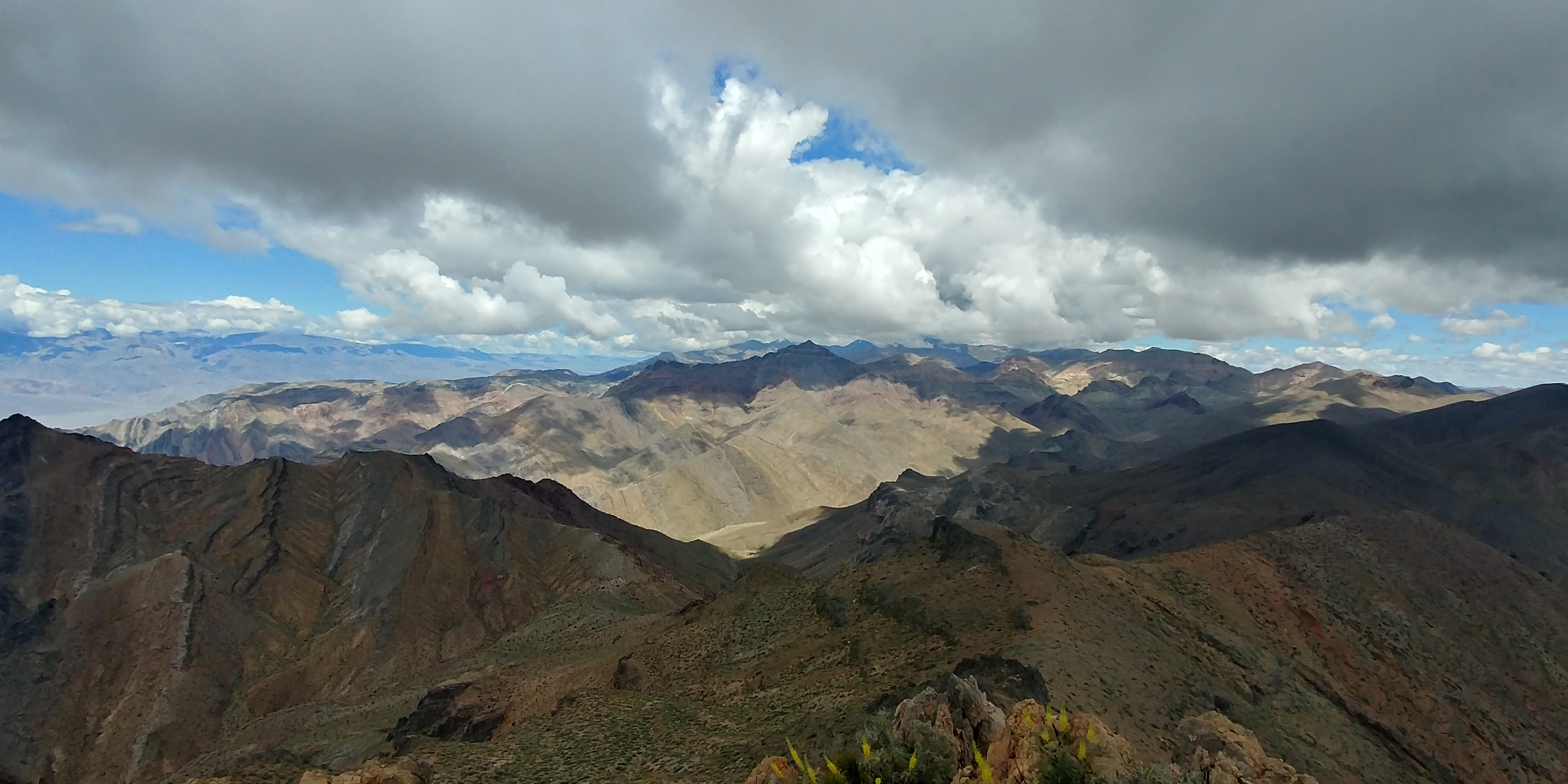
View from Corkscrew peak, looking North

The trail starts from Daylight Pass Road. Its length is 5.8 kilometers. It follows a wash for about 3 kilometers, then a small canyon, and finally, a steep (25% average) ridge to the summit.
