= Funeral Mountains =

Mountain range along the eastern wall of Death Valley

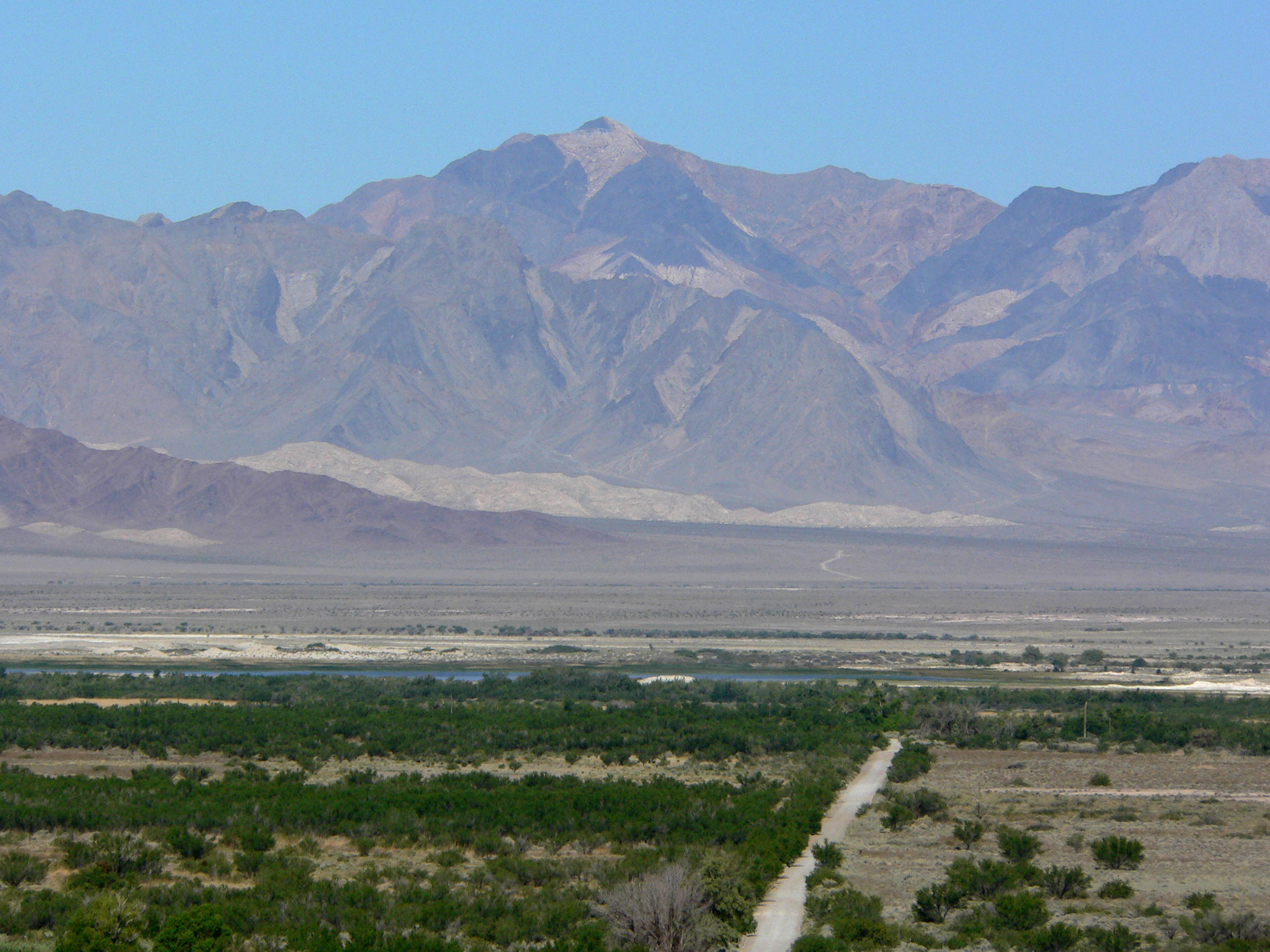
- Pyramid Peak seen from Ash Meadows in Nevada

Highest point
- Elevation: 2,043 m (6,703 ft)

Geography
- Location within California
- Country: United States
- State: California
- District: Inyo County
- Range coordinates: 36°23′30″N 116°36′43″W
- Topo map: USGS East of Echo Canyon

The Funeral Mountains is a short, arid mountain range in the United States along the California-Nevada border approximately 100 mi (160 km) west of Las Vegas. The mountains are considered a subrange of the Amargosa Range that form the eastern wall of Death Valley.

The crest of the range is within Death Valley National Park. The range is separated from the Grapevine Mountains to the northwest by the narrow Boundary Canyon and is separated from the Black Mountains by Furnace Creek Wash on the southwest and from the Greenwater Range at the narrow Travertine Point on the south. The broad flats of the Amargosa Desert lie across the border to the northeast in Nevada. The highest point in the range is Pyramid Peak, at 6703 ft (2043 m).

The first movement of Ferde Grofé's Death Valley Suite is a symphonic musical portrayal of pioneer settlers trudging through the dry craggy peaks of the Funeral Mountains.

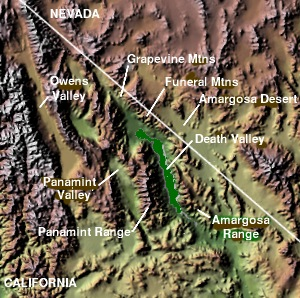
Death Valley

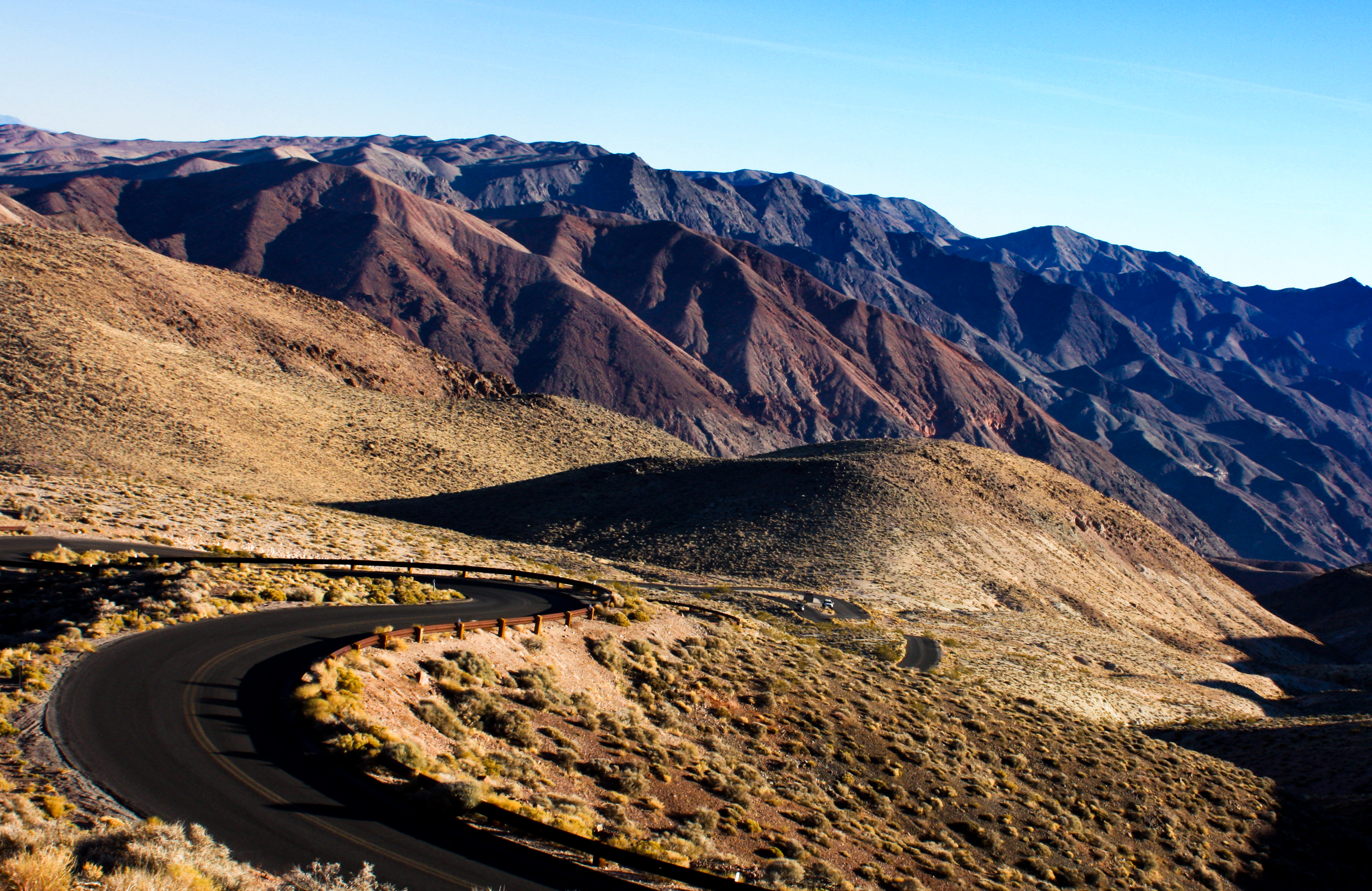
The winding road from Dante's View descends into the Funeral Mountains, Death Valley National Park.
