= Gower Gulch (Death Valley) =

Gulch on the eastern side of Death Valley in Inyo County, California

Coordinates: 36°25′0.33″N 116°49′24.94″W

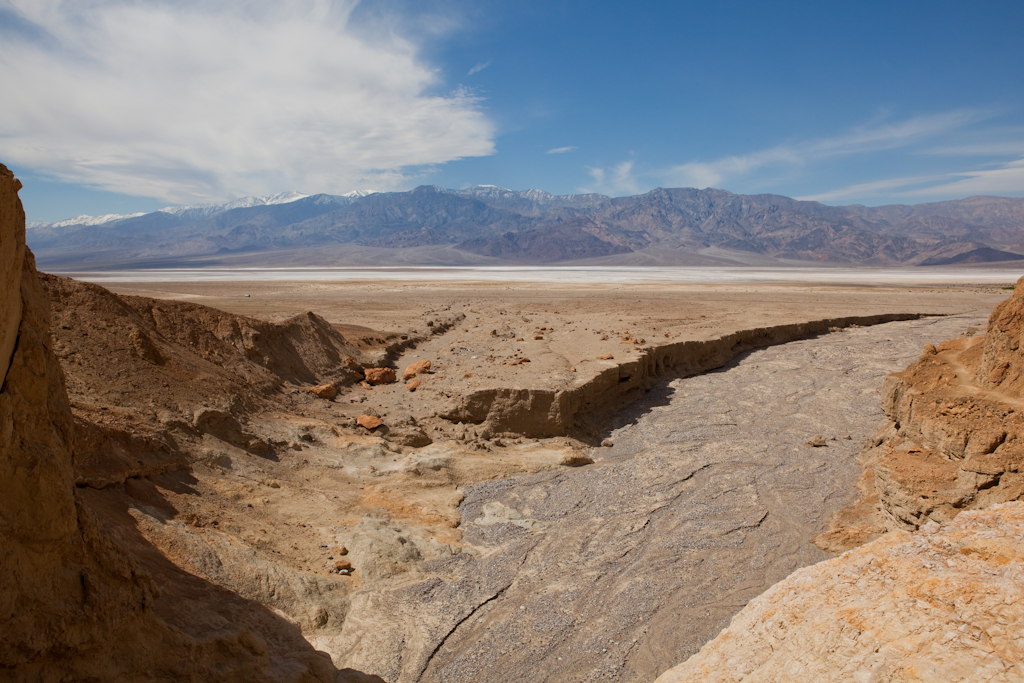
Gower Gulch, March 2010

Gower Gulch is a small gulch on the eastern side of Death Valley in Inyo County, California. It is located in the Black Mountains. Gower Gulch is visible from Zabriskie Point and is about one and a half miles long.

== History ==
Gower Gulch is named after Harry P. Gower, an official of the Pacific Coast Borax Company and co-owner of the Furnace Creek Inn and Ranch, before Death Valley became a national monument. The gulch contained mines, camps, and roads during the late 19th century and early 20th century.

== Geology ==
Gower Gulch passes through three geological formations:

- the Badlands in the easternmost portion
- the Artist's Palette Formation mid channel
- the Playa Formation at the channel head.

There are two areas of dry waterfalls: the Upper Knickzone near Zabriskie Point and the Lower Knickzone near the gulch's Alluvial fan. The tallest fall, at the head of the alluvial fan, is approximately 25 ft. high, the only way around it being a ledge on the northern side of the fan. The alluvial fan has a deep channel, called a telescoping channel, that runs north-west from Gower Gulch's mouth.

== Mining ==
Gower Gulch was mined in after the 1880s, when a 1 1/2-mile-long (2.4 km) road starting at the northern side of Zabriskie Point was built by the Pacific Coast Borax Company. This road allowed wagons and autos to reach the ten borax mine claims in the gulch. many of these mines are still visible today, though mines on the floor bed of Gower Gulch have been filled in with sediment from past floods.

== Diversion ==
In 1941 a 5-foot-deep (1.5 m) Furnace Creek-Gower Gulch Flood diversion channel was blasted upstream from Zabriskie Point to divert flood waters from the Furnace Creek Wash and the resorts into Gower Gulch. The diversion increased the size of Gower Gulch's drainage basin from 2.77 km^{2} to 455.63 km^{2}, an increase of 16,348%. As a result, massive erosion of the channel took place as debris from Furnace Creek were channeled into Gower Gulch. Today the diversion has sunk to over 20 feet deep with two dry falls, one three feet and another ten feet high.

== See also ==
- Category: Death Valley
