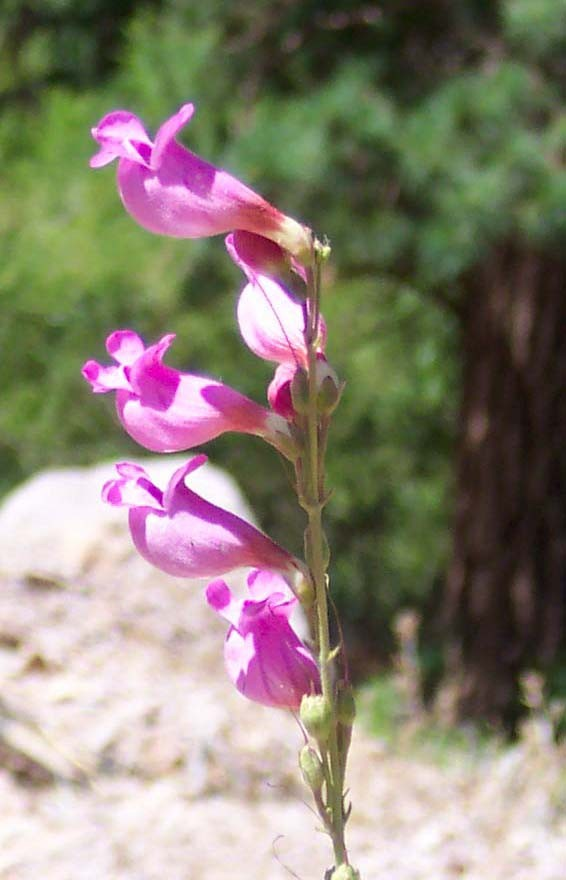
- var. floridus

Conservation status
- Vulnerable (NatureServe)

Scientific classification
- Kingdom: Plantae
- Clade: Tracheophytes
- Clade: Angiosperms
- Clade: Eudicots
- Clade: Asterids
- Order: Lamiales
- Family: Plantaginaceae
- Genus: Penstemon
- Species: P. floridus

Binomial name
- Penstemon floridus Brandegee

Varieties
- Penstemon floridus var. austini (Eastw.) N.H.Holmgren; Penstemon floridus var. floridus

Synonyms
- List: Penstemon floridus subsp. typicus D.D.Keck

= Penstemon floridus =

Plant species in the veronica family

Penstemon floridus is a species of flowering plant in the plantain family known by the common names Panamint penstemon and rose penstemon.

It is native to the lower mountain and plateau areas of the Mojave Desert, within eastern California and southwestern Nevada. It grows in canyons, arroyos, and sagebrush scrub.

== Description ==
Penstemon floridus is a herbaceous plant that grows to between 50 and 120 centimeters (1.6 and 3.9 ft) tall when full grown. Its stems can either grow straight up or grow outward a short amount before curving to grow upwards. They are hairless and glaucous, covered in natural waxes giving them a somewhat gray or blue coloration.

Plants have both basal and cauline leaves, ones that grow directly from the base of the plant and those that are attached to the stems. The leaves are thick and generally dentate, having large teeth along their edges. The basal leaves and the lowest ones on the stems have short petioles and range in length from 5 to 10 centimeters (2.0 to 3.9 in) and are usually 2 to 4.5 cm (0.79 to 1.77 in) wide, though on occasion they may be just 8 millimeters wide. They also come in a variety of shapes including obovate to ovate, oblanceolate, or lanceolate. On the stems there are six to nine pairs of leaves. The upper ones may have their bases directly attached to the main stem and may also clasp it.

The hairy and glandular inflorescence is 30 to 80 cm (1.0 to 2.6 ft) at the end of each stem with nine to nineteen groups of flowers. The flowers all face one direction. The flowers are showy and measure 2.1 to 3.2 cm long with a wide throat that is narrower at the mouth, especially in var. floridus, resembling an inflated pink pufferfish. The color of the fused petals can be lavender to light pink, rose pink, or light yellow, but always with darker red nectar guide lines.

== Taxonomy ==
The scientific description and name of Penstemon floridus was published by Townshend Stith Brandegee in 1899.

=== Varieties ===
There are two varieties of this species. Where they meet in the southern Silver Peak Range and southern White Mountains they hybridize.

==== Penstemon floridus var. austinii ====
Austin's beardtongue, named for Stafford Wallace Austin, collector of plants and husband of writer Mary Hunter Austin. It has two synonyms as it was initially described by Alice Eastwood as a species named Penstemon austini in 1905. In 1937 it was described as a subspecies by David D. Keck before it was reclassified as a variety by Noel H.Holmgren in 1979. It grows in Inyo County, California where it is found on the Grapevine Mountains, Inyo Mountains, Last Chance Range, Panamint Range, and White Mountains. Across the boarder in Esmeralda County, Nevada, they grow on the Silver Peak Range. Further west in Nye County the variety can be found on Shoshone Mountain and Tolicha Peak.

==== Penstemon floridus var. floridus ====
The autonymic variety grows to the north in the central Sierra Nevada. In California it grows at the north end of Owens Valley and also in the White Mountains in Inyo and Mono counties. While in Nevada it only grows in Esmeralda County in the Silver Peak Range.

=== Names ===
The species name, floridus, means "many flowered". In English it is known by the common name Panamint penstemon. It is also known as rosy penstemon.

== Range and habitat ==
Penstemon floridus is limited to the deserts of Nevada and southern California. It grows with desert sagebrush and pinyon-juniper woodland communities, usually in the gravelly soil of arroyos and canyons.

=== Conservation ===
In 1998 the conservation organization NatureServe evaluated Penstemon floridus and rated it as vulnerable (G3).

== See also ==
- List of Penstemon species
