= Amargosa Range =

Mountain range bordering Death Valley

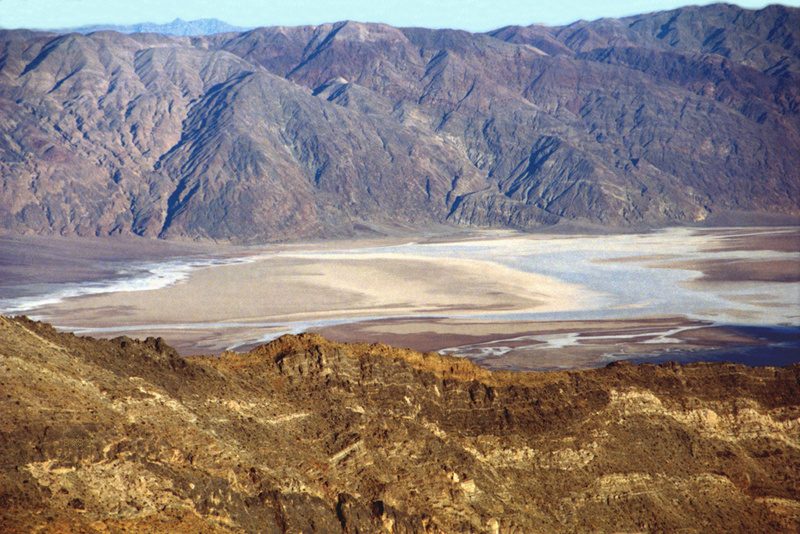
- From Telescope Peak trail

Highest point
- Peak: Grapevine Peak
- Elevation: 8,738 ft (2,663 m)
- Coordinates: 36°30′27″N 116°38′4″W

Dimensions
- Length: 110 mi (180 km)

Geography
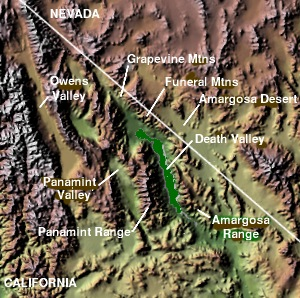
- Death Valley landmarks

The Amargosa Range is a mountain range in Inyo County, California, San Bernardino County, California, and Nye County, Nevada. The 110-mile (180 km) range runs along most of the eastern side of California's Death Valley, separating it from Nevada's Amargosa Desert. The U-shaped Amargosa River flows clockwise around the perimeter of the range, ending 282 feet (86 m) below sea level in the Badwater Basin.

The mountain range is named after the Amargosa River, so-named for the Spanish word for bitter because of the bitter taste of the water.

In order from north to south, the Grapevine Mountains (including the range's highest point, 8,738 feet (2,663 m) Grapevine Peak), the Funeral Mountains, and the Black Mountains form distinct sections. Many of Death Valley National Park's most well-known features, such as Zabriskie Point and Artists Drive are located in or are part of the Amargosa Range.

The Amargosa mountains are also home to Corkscrew Peak, so named because it resembles a corkscrew.
