= Zabriskie Point =

Part of the Amargosa Range in Death Valley National Park, California, United States

Coordinates: 36°25′12″N 116°48′40″W

Zabriskie Point (/zəˈbrɪski/) is a part of the Amargosa Range located east of Death Valley in Death Valley National Park in California, United States, noted for its erosional landscape. It is composed of sediments from Furnace Creek Lake, which dried up 5 million years ago—long before Death Valley came into existence.

Panoramic view from Zabriskie Point

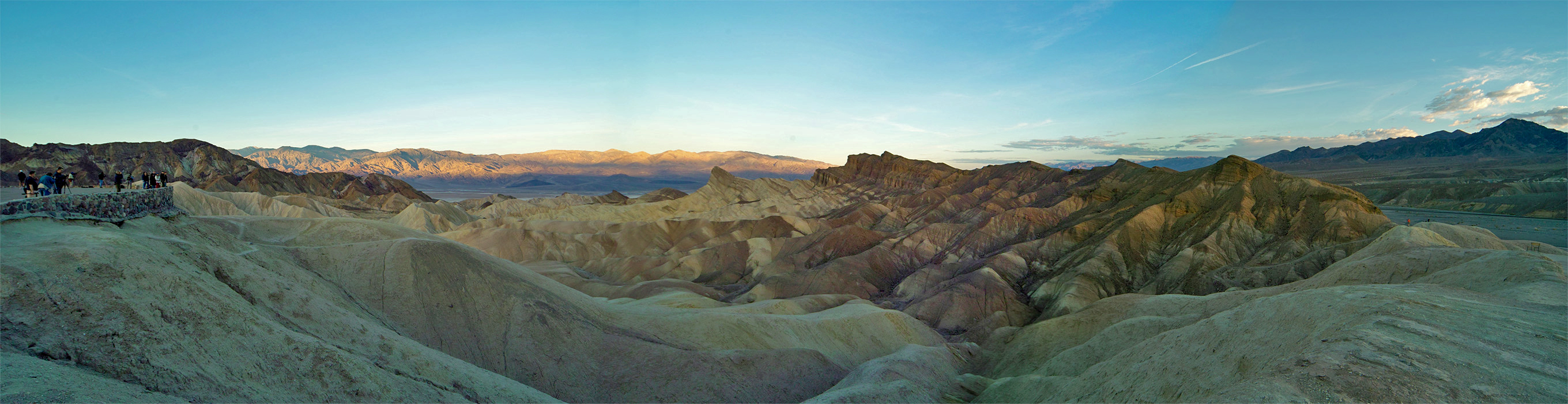
Another panoramic view from Zabriskie Point, at sunrise

== Name ==
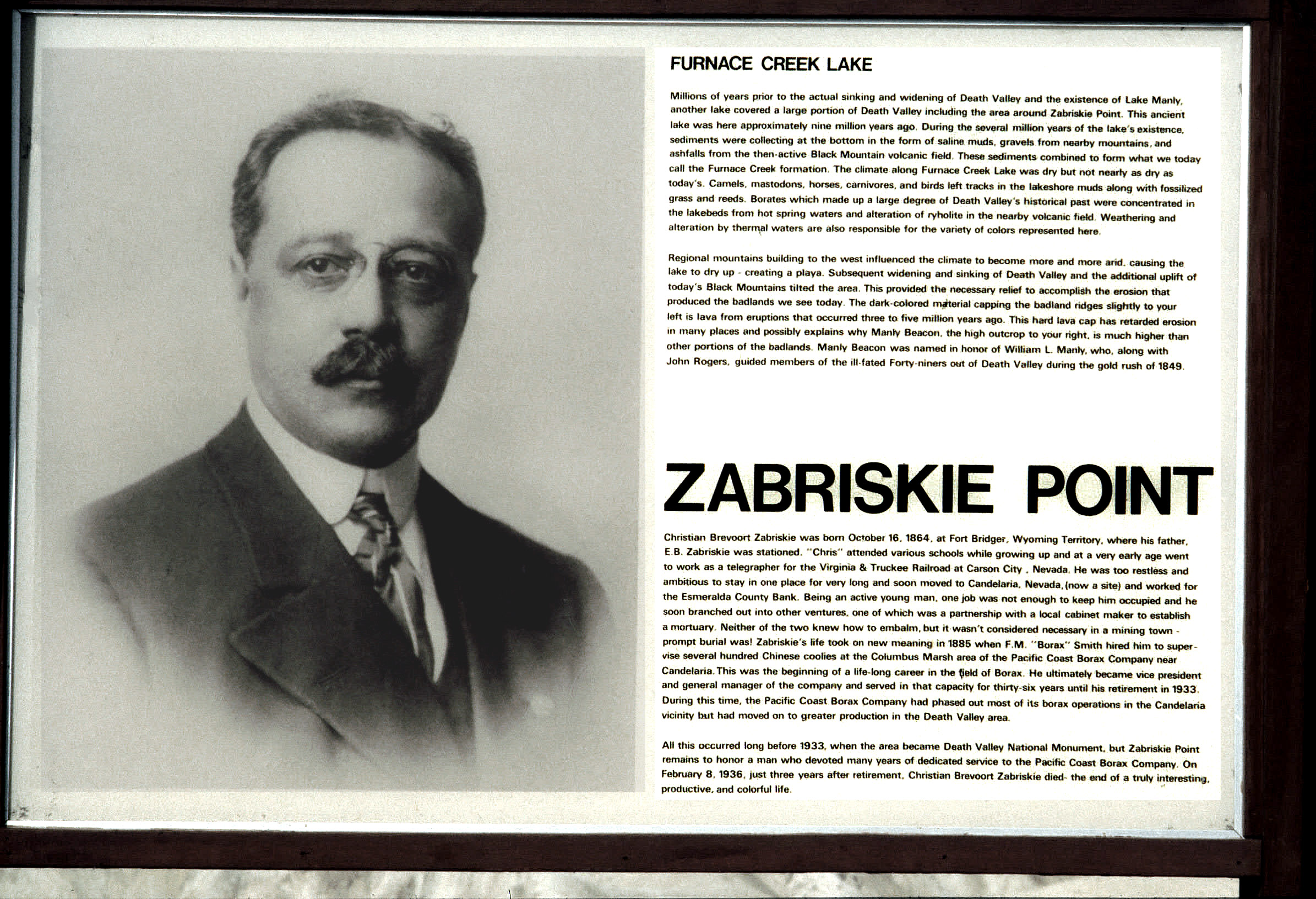
Portrait of Christian Brevoort Zabriskie, on an interpretive sign at the Zabriskie Point site in Death Valley National Park

The location was named after Christian Brevoort Zabriskie, vice-president and general manager of the Pacific Coast Borax Company in the early 20th century. The company's twenty-mule teams were used to transport borax from its mining operations in Death Valley.

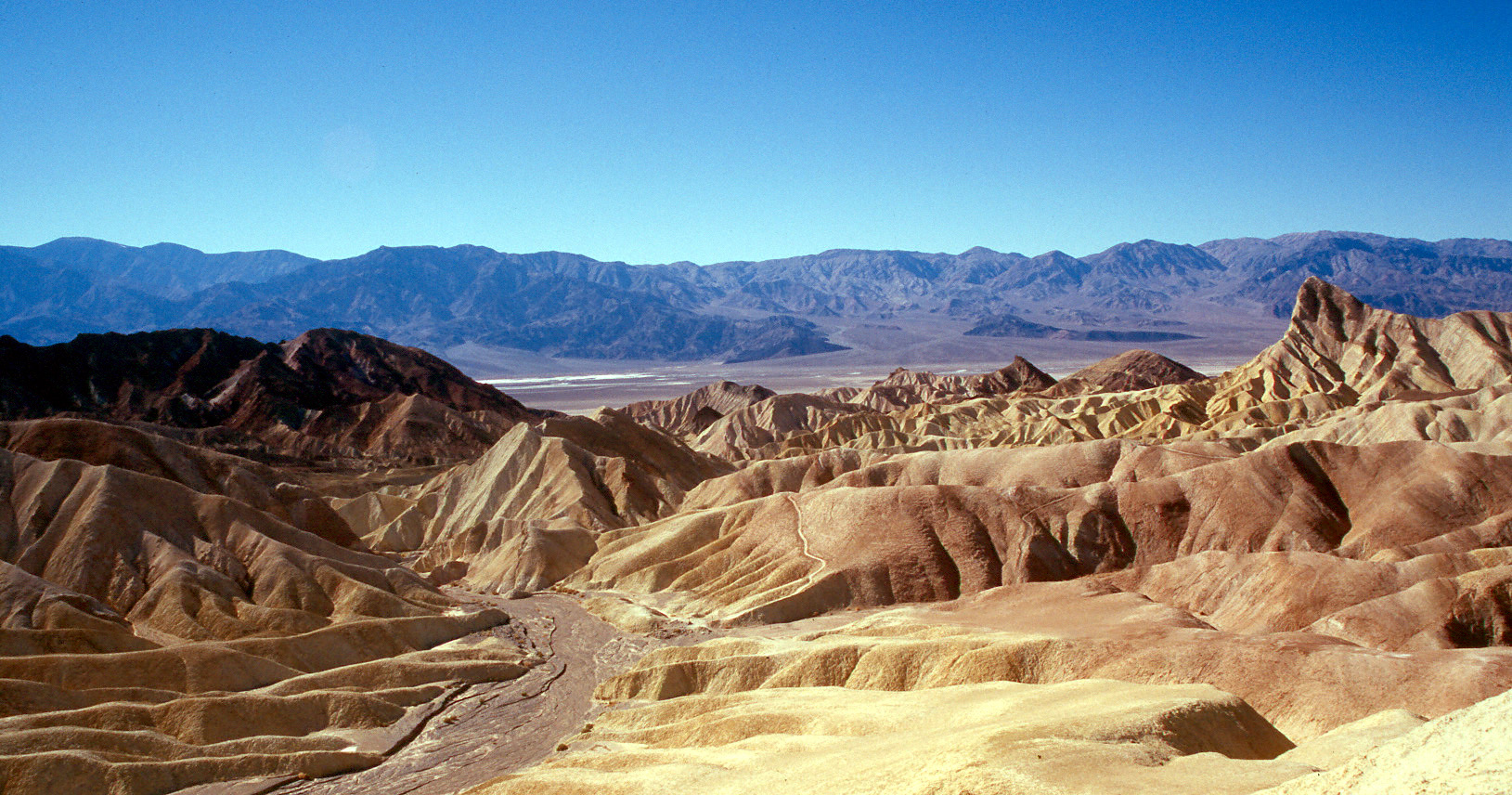
Zabriskie Point, Death Valley (USA)

== History ==
Millions of years prior to the actual sinking and widening of Death Valley and the existence of Lake Manly (see Geology of the Death Valley area), another lake covered a large portion of Death Valley including the area around Zabriskie Point. This ancient lake began forming approximately nine million years ago. During several million years of the lake's existence, sediments were collecting at the bottom in the form of saline muds, gravels from nearby mountains, and ashfalls from the then-active Black Mountain volcanic field. These sediments combined to form what we today call the Furnace Creek Formation. The climate along Furnace Creek Lake was dry, but not nearly as dry as in the present. Paracamelus, mastodons, wild horses, carnivores, and birds left tracks in the lakeshore muds, along with fossilized grass and reeds. Borates, which made up a large portion of Death Valley's historical past were concentrated in the lakebeds from hot spring waters and alteration of rhyolite in the nearby volcanic field. Weathering and alteration by thermal waters are also responsible for the variety of colors represented there.

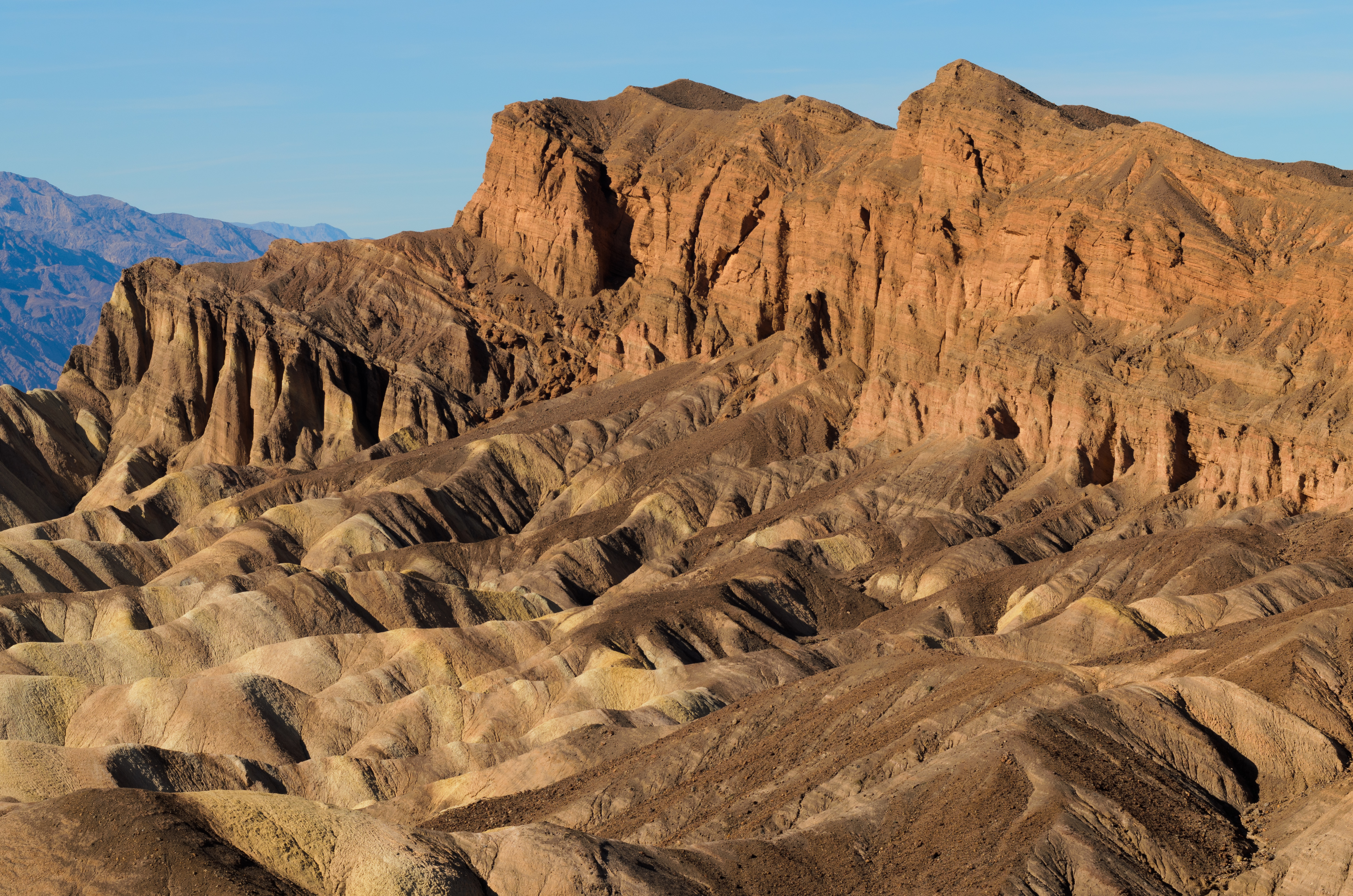
Close-up of Red Cathedral, to the right of Manly Beacon

Regional mountain-building to the west influenced the climate to become more and more arid, causing the lake to dry up, and creating a dry lake. Subsequent widening and sinking of Death Valley and the additional uplift of today's Black Mountains tilted the area. This provided the necessary relief to accomplish the erosion that produced the badlands we see today. The dark-colored material capping the badland ridges (to the left in the panoramic photograph) is lava from eruptions that occurred three to five million years ago. This hard lava cap has retarded erosion in many places and possibly explains why Manly Beacon, the high outcrop to the right, is much higher than other portion of the badlands. (Manly Beacon was named in honor of William L. Manly, who along with John Rogers, guided members of the ill-fated party of Forty-niners out of Death Valley during the California Gold Rush of 1849.)

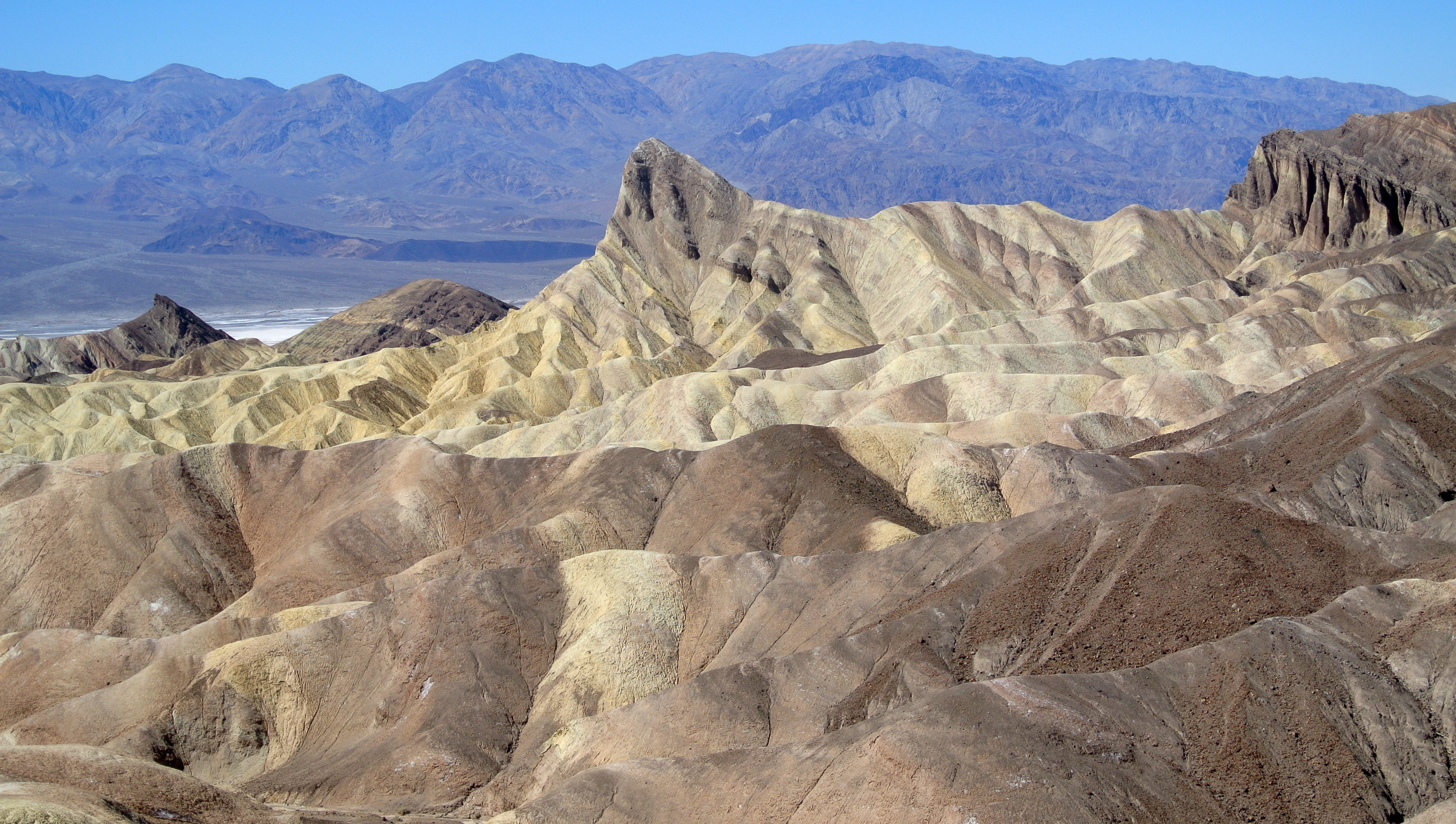
View of Manly Beacon from Zabriskie Point, showing convolutions, texture, and color contrasts in the eroded rock

The primary source of borate minerals gathered from Death Valley's playas is Furnace Creek Formation. The Formation is made up of over 5000 feet (1500 m) of mudstone, siltstone, and conglomerate. The borates were concentrated in these lakebeds from hot spring waters and altered rhyolite from nearby volcanic fields.

== In literature and the arts ==
Zabriskie Point is the title of a 1970 movie by Italian director Michelangelo Antonioni; its soundtrack features music by British bands Pink Floyd and the Rolling Stones, Americans Jerry Garcia and the Grateful Dead, and others.

This location is featured prominently on the cover of U2's album The Joshua Tree.

This location was used to represent the surface of Mars in the 1964 film Robinson Crusoe on Mars.

Zabriskie Point is the name of Radio Massacre International's album released in 2000.

Zabriskie Point is a Soviet code for a location on the surface of the Moon in Omon Ra, a dystopian thriller novel by Victor Pelevin.

Zabriskie Point is a significant location in the novels Fall of Night, Dust and Decay, and Fire and Ash by Jonathan Maberry, in each case, as the location of a top secret chemical and biological research station.

Zabriskie Point was used as a film location for the 1960 Universal film Spartacus, showing Gladiator school boss Peter Ustinov on muleback trekking to an Egyptian mine to buy slaves to put in training.

Shots taken from Zabriskie Point of Red Cathedral and Manly Beacon were used as the basis for shots that were then digitally altered to form the planet of Arvala-7 in the first season of The Mandalorian.

The philosopher Michel Foucault called his 1975 acid trip at Zabriskie Point the greatest experience of his life.
