= Quail Mountains =

Mountain range in California, United States

- Location within California

Highest point
- Elevation: 1,218 m (3,996 ft)

Geography
- Country: United States
- State: California
- District: San Bernardino County
- Range coordinates: 35°36′44.869″N 116°49′53.135″W
- Topo map: USGS Leach Spring

The Quail Mountains are located southwest of Death Valley National Park in eastern California, USA. The range lies to the north of the Granite Mountains and south of the Owlshead Mountains, and reaches an elevation of 1,555 meters above sea level.

The mountains lie along the border of Death Valley National Park and the Naval Air Weapons Station China Lake, which is a restricted area. The Slate Range is to the northwest.
