= Owlshead Mountains =

Mountains in California

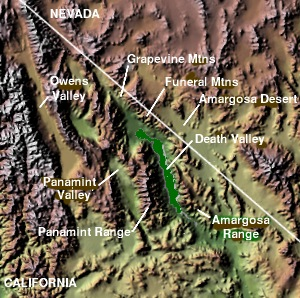
- Death Valley landmarks

Highest point
- Elevation: 712 m (2,336 ft)

Geography
- Location within California
- Country: United States
- State: California
- District: San Bernardino County
- Range coordinates: 35°43′45″N 116°44′14″W
- Topo map: USGS Owl Lake

The Owlshead Mountains are at the southern end of Death Valley National Park near the border of the Fort Irwin Military Reservation in Inyo and San Bernardino Counties, California, US.

== Geography ==
The range lies in the Mojave Desert, north of the Granite Mountains and the Avawatz Mountains, south of the Black Mountains at the south end of Death Valley. The Greenwater Range is to the northeast, the Slate Range is west, and the Kingston Range east.

The mean annual precipitation in the range is five inches or less. The Owlshead Mountains are arranged in a semi-circular pattern, with the Amargosa River to the north.

The Owlshead Mountains are primarily known for the scenic canyons found within the range that are made up of Decomposed granite. Some of the most well-known canyons include Wingate Slot Canyon, Slickenside Canyon, Talc Canyon, Owlshead Canyon, Contact Canyon, Granite Canyon, Through Canyon, Smoke Tree Canyon, Passage Canyon, Sand Canyon, and Sagenite Canyon. Visitation to these canyons is limited due to their remote location and the long distances required to reach them by hiking. Within the range there are three usually dry playa lake beds – Owl Lake, Lost Lake, and Wingate Lake.

== See also ==
- Mountain ranges of the Mojave Desert
- Epsom Salts Monorail
