= Grapevine Peak =

Mountain in Death Valley National Park, Nevada, United States

- Location within Nevada

Highest point
- Elevation: 8,743 ft (2,665 m) NAVD 88
- Prominence: 4,562 ft (1,390 m)
- Coordinates: 36°58′02″N 117°08′59″W

Geography
- Location: Nye County, Nevada, U.S.
- Parent range: Grapevine Mountains
- Topo map: USGS GRAPEVINE PEAK

Grapevine Peak is the highest mountain in the Grapevine Mountains of Nye County in Nevada, United States. It is the fourth-most topographically prominent peak in Nye County and ranks seventeenth among the most topographically prominent peaks in Nevada. The peak is located within the boundaries of Death Valley National Park.
