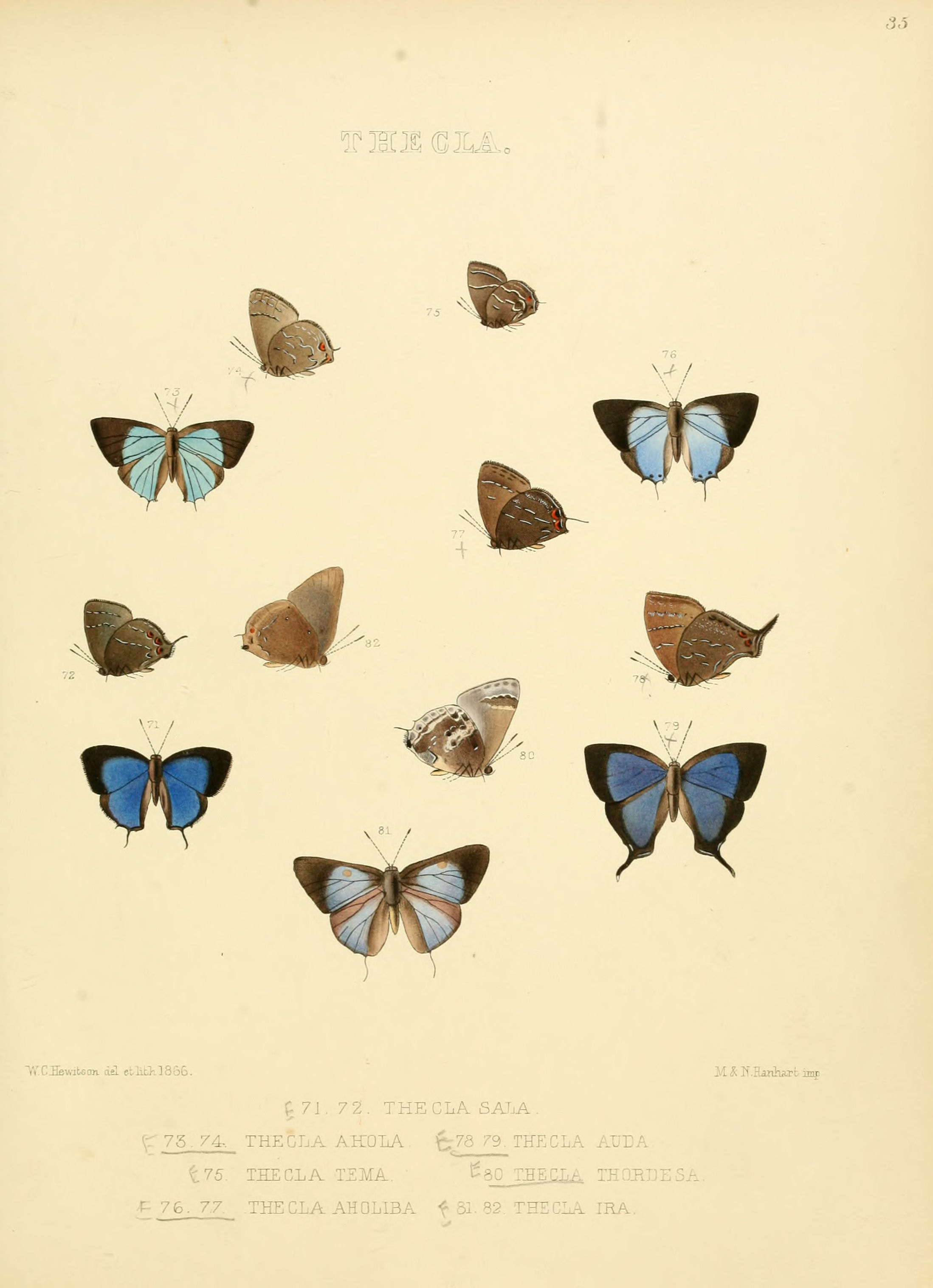
- Salazaria sala (figures 71 and 72)

Scientific classification
- Kingdom: Animalia
- Phylum: Arthropoda
- Class: Insecta
- Order: Lepidoptera
- Family: Lycaenidae
- Subfamily: Theclinae
- Tribe: Eumaeini
- Genus: Salazaria; D'Abrera & Bálint, 2001

= Salazaria (butterfly) =

Butterfly genus in family Lycaenidae

Salazaria is a gossamer-winged butterfly genus of tribe Eumaeini in the subfamily Theclinae. As far as is known, these butterflies occur in the northern Andean region around Ecuador.

It is generally agreed that they represents a distinct lineage worthy of recognition as a full genus. However, there is some dispute about whether the name was validly established, or is a nomen nudum. The matter has been submitted to the ICZN for discussion.

Two named species are placed here. Several additional species assumed to belong here have also been discovered, but not yet described:

- Salazaria elizabetha (Salazar, Vélez & Johnson, 1997) Colombia
- Salazaria sala (Hewitson, 1867) Colombia
- ?Salazaria sp. 'Ecuador 1'
- ?Salazaria sp. 'Ecuador 2'
- ?Salazaria sp. 'Ecuador 3'
- ?Salazaria sp. 'Ecuador 4'
- ?Salazaria sp. 'Peru'
