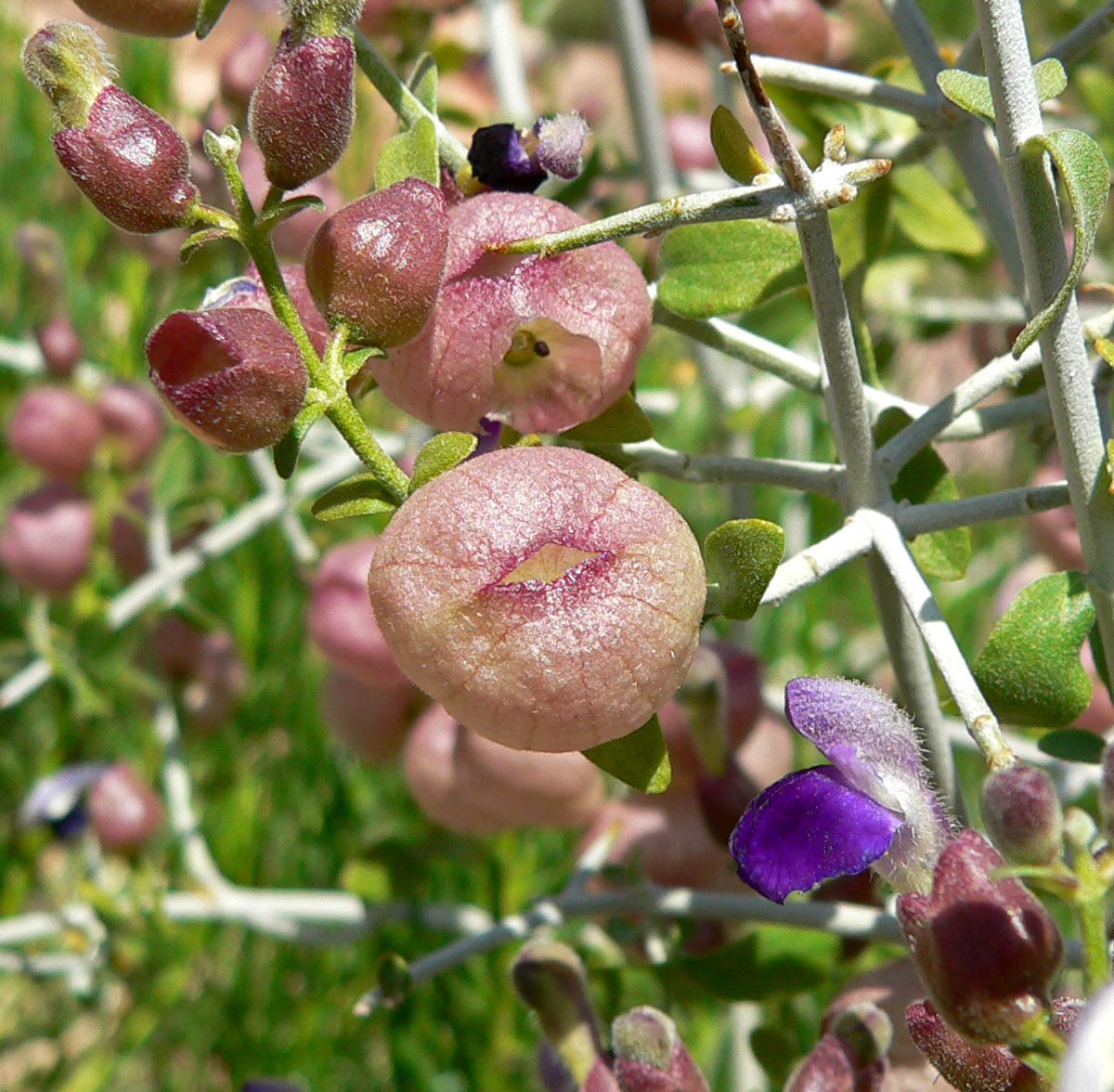
- Flower and "bladders"

Scientific classification
- Kingdom: Plantae
- Clade: Tracheophytes
- Clade: Angiosperms
- Clade: Eudicots
- Clade: Asterids
- Order: Lamiales
- Family: Lamiaceae
- Genus: Scutellaria
- Species: S. mexicana

Binomial name
- Scutellaria mexicana (Torr.) A.J. Paton

Synonyms
- Salazaria mexicana Torr.

= Scutellaria mexicana =

Species of shrub

Scutellaria mexicana, commonly known by variants on bladder sage or paperbag bush, is a shrub of the mint family Lamiaceae distinctive for its calyx lobes that develop into small bag- or bladder-like shells around the fruits.

== Habitat and range ==
It is widespread in sandy and gravelly slopes, desert dry washes, and canyons in the southwestern deserts of North America, including in creosote bush scrub and Joshua tree woodland plant communities in the Mojave, Sonoran and Chihuahuan Deserts in southern California, Nevada, southwestern Utah, Arizona, western Texas, Chihuahua, Sonora, and Baja California.

These bushes occupy a variety of habitats in their range, including washes, gravelly or sandy slopes, shrubland, and woodland, often growing intermixed with other shrubs. The range extends from the eastern slopes of the Sierra Nevada and the deserts of California, east to Texas and south into Mexico. They are relatively common; although both the foliage and flowers are sparse, the distinctive pattern of bags makes them easy to spot from a distance.

== Description ==
=== Growth pattern ===
This plant takes the form of a rounded shrub, typically 50–100 cm high, sometimes larger.

=== Stems and leaves ===
The stems form a spreading rigid pattern, with the tips often becoming spine-like. The branching pattern is distinctive, with opposite side branches forming right angles to the main stem. The plant drops its leaves in dry conditions (drought deciduous).

The leaves are opposite, small, 3–15 mm long and 2–8 mm wide, ovate to elliptic, have smooth edges (entire), and with a very short or nonexistent petiole.

=== Inflorescence and fruit ===
The 2-lipped flowers develop in pairs facing away from each other; the upper lip is white to light violet and hairy, while the lower lip is 3-lobed and intense dark violet. The calyx starts out as simply a base to the flower, reddish-purple in shade, and then as the flower ages, it expands into its distinctive bag shape, 1–2 cm across, the dried flower eventually falling out of the hole in the end.

The fruit inside the dried calyx bags is composed of 4 nutlets. The plant drops its leaves in dry conditions (drought deciduous). The dried bags help with seed dispersal by wind.

Flowering is generally April through June, but the bags are durable and may last on the plant into winter, becoming dry and papery.

== Etymology ==
The former genus name, "Salazaria", is after astronomer José Salazar y Larregui, Mexican commissioner for the United States and Mexican Boundary Survey of 1848–55.
