= Greenwater Range =

Mountain range in California, United States

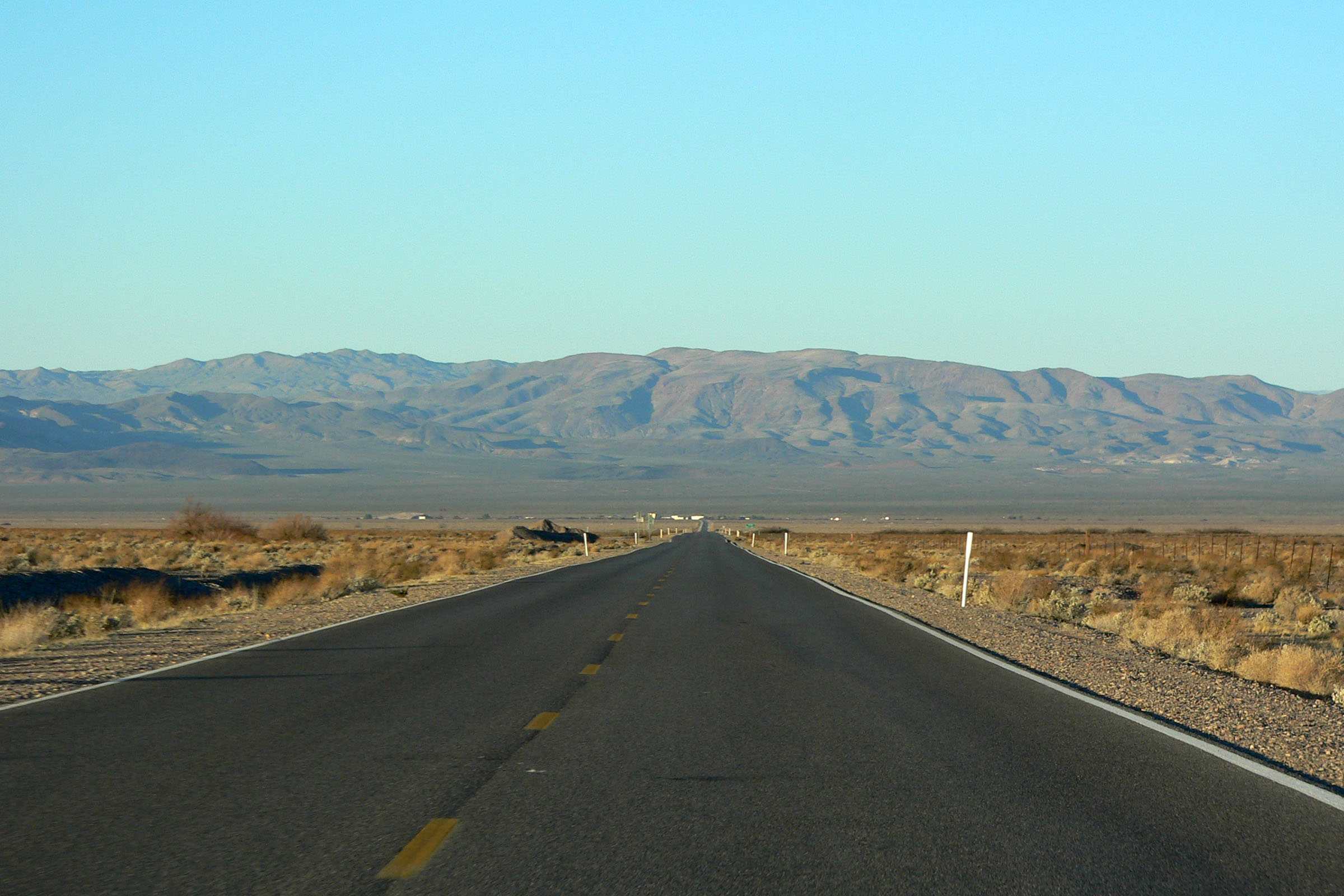
- The Greenwater Range is on the horizon beyond Death Valley Junction.

Highest point
- Elevation: 1,130 m (3,710 ft)

Geography
- Location within California
- Country: United States
- State: California
- District: Inyo County
- Range coordinates: 36°10′18.841″N 116°32′48.151″W
- Topo map: USGS Greenwater Canyon

The Greenwater Range is a mountain range located in the eastern Mojave Desert in Inyo County, California. They are located west of the section of California State Route 127 north of Shoshone, California.

== Geography ==
The mountains lie a short distance to the east of the Black Mountains, and south of the Amargosa Range, and northwest of the Nopah Range. Ryan, California is in the northern section, and the southern part of the range is within Death Valley National Park.

Death Valley Junction, home of the Amargosa Opera House and Hotel, and the Amargosa River are to the east of the Greenwater Range.
