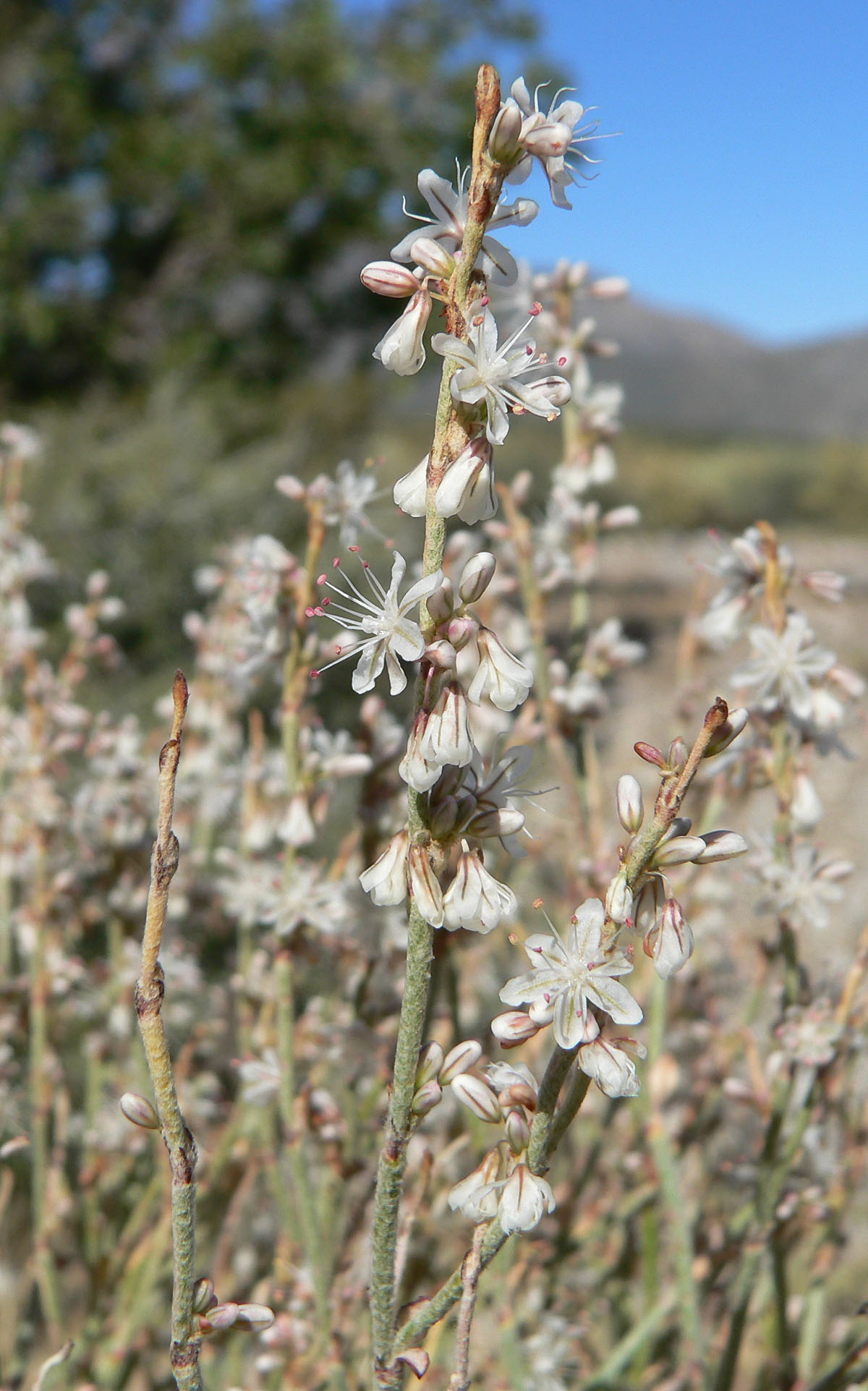

Conservation status
- Vulnerable (NatureServe)

Scientific classification
- Kingdom: Plantae
- Clade: Tracheophytes
- Clade: Angiosperms
- Clade: Eudicots
- Order: Caryophyllales
- Family: Polygonaceae
- Genus: Eriogonum
- Species: E. panamintense

Binomial name
- Eriogonum panamintense C.V.Morton

= Eriogonum panamintense =

Species of wild buckwheat

Eriogonum panamintense is a species of wild buckwheat known by the common name Panamint Mountain buckwheat. It is native to several of the desert mountain ranges of eastern California and western Nevada, including the Panamint Range. It grows in various types of mountain ridge habitat, such as sagebrush and coniferous woodland.

== Description ==
This is a perennial herb producing small clumps of erect stems up to about 40 centimeters. The woolly, oval leaves are located around the base of the stems. The inflorescence is a spreading array of branches lined with clusters of white to off-white to brownish flowers, each of which is no more than half a centimeter long.
