= Roof pendant =

Geological feature

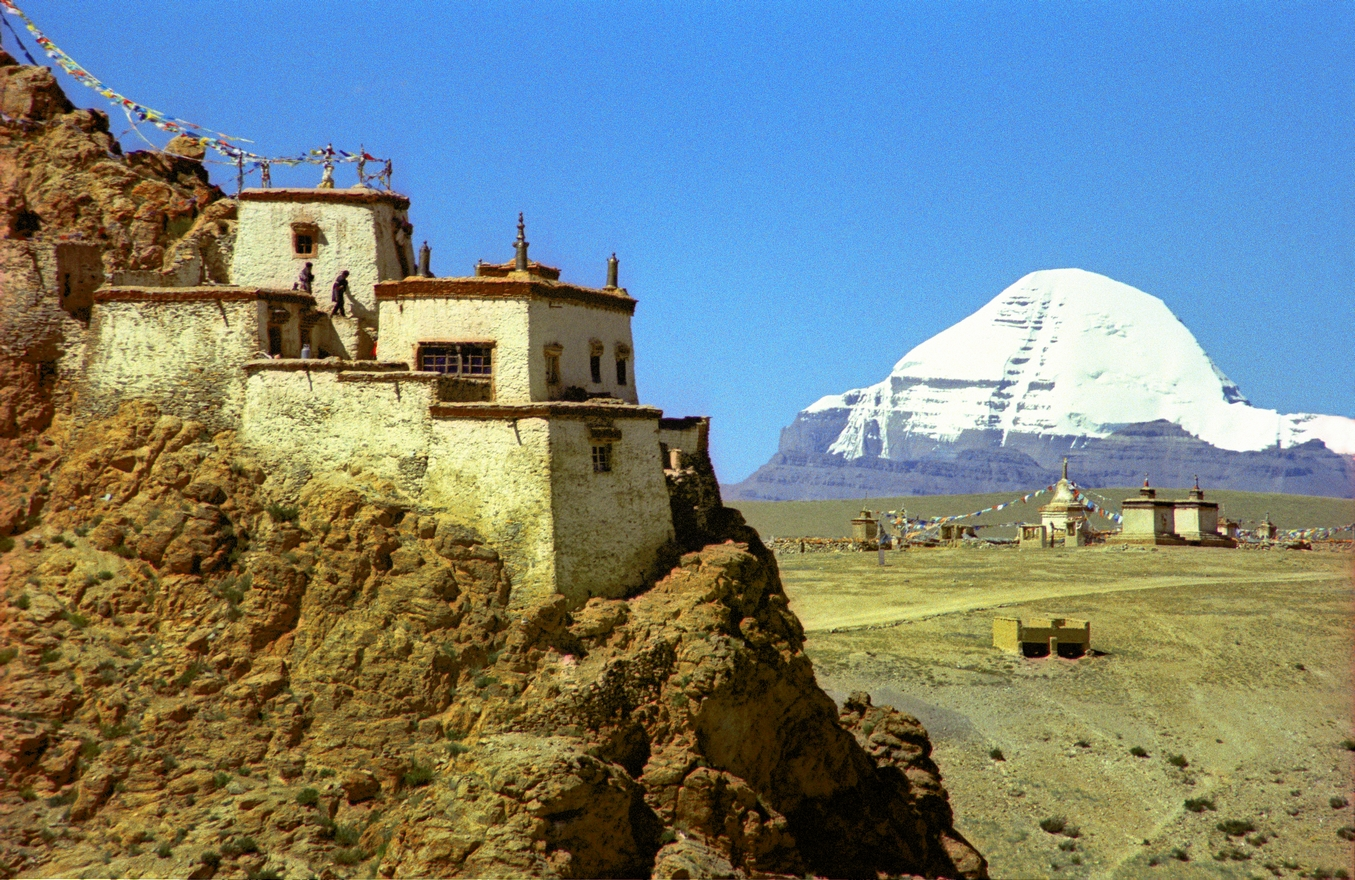
View of Mount Kailash, Tibet (in the right distance), showing both the metasedimentary roof pendant and the underlying granite rock which caused the metamorphosis of the sediments above.

In structural geology, a roof pendant, also known as a pendant, is a mass of country rock that projects downward into and is entirely surrounded by an igneous intrusion such as a batholith or other pluton. In lay terminology sometimes "rock hat" is used. A roof pendant is an erosional remnant that was created by the removal of the overlying country rock that formed the roof of the igneous intrusion that encloses it. If this downward protruding mass of roof rock separates two different plutons it is known as either septum or screen. Roof pendants typically have been strongly metamorphosed through the processes of contact metamorphism.

A classic, well-documented example of a roof pendant is the strata that comprise Mount Morrison within the Sierra Nevada in Mono and Fresno counties, California. It lies midway between Mono Lake on the north and Bishop, California, on the south. Mount Morrison consists of a roof pendant that underlies an area of 62 km^{2} (24 sq mi). This roof pendant consists of a 15,000-meter-thick (49,000 ft) sequence of complexly folded and faulted metasedimentary strata and metavolcanic strata. The eastern two-thirds of this roof pendant consists of Cambrian to Silurian and Pennsylvanian to Permian metasedimentary strata. Metavolcanic rocks of Mesozoic age comprise the western third of the roof pendant. Mesozoic granitic rocks enclose and intrude the pendant rocks. These granitic rocks consist predominantly of quartz monzonite and granodiorite with local, minor, scattered bodies of granite, aplite, diorite and gabbro. These pendants are part of a discontinuous, 140-kilometre-long (87 mi), northwest-trending belt of roof pendants that are preserved within the granitic plutons of Sierra Nevada.

== See also ==
- Xenolith
- Enclave
