= Black Mountains (California) =

Mountain range in Death Valley National Park, United States

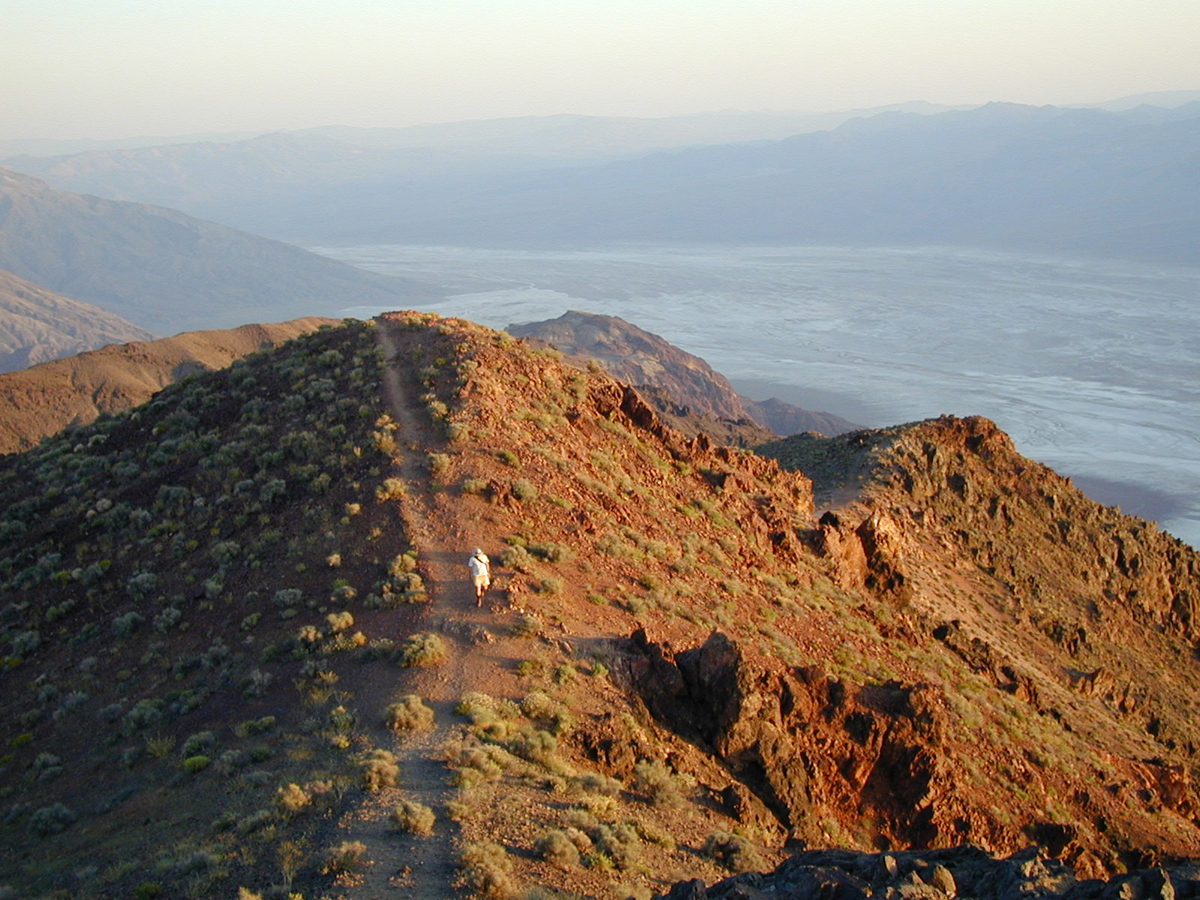
- A hiker walks up Dante's View, in the Black Mountains

Highest point
- Peak: Funeral Peak, Black Mountains (California)
- Elevation: 6,384 ft (1,946 m)

Geography
- Location within California Location within the United States
- Country: United States
- State: California
- District: Inyo County
- Range coordinates: 36°8′55.837″N 116°39′31.160″W
- Topo map: USGS Dantes View

The Black Mountains are a mountain range located in the southern part of Inyo County and northern San Bernardino County, California, in the southeast part of Death Valley National Park.

== Geography ==
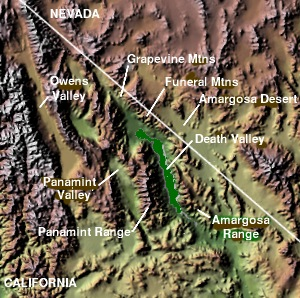
Geography of Death Valley National Park area.

The Black Mountains are a southern range of the Amargosa Range System and lie in a generally north–south direction at their southwestern end. Their formation has been classified as the Amargosa Chaos.

Lower Death Valley lies to the west & southwest of the Black Mountains section, with Greenwater Valley and the Greenwater Range to the northeast. The Black Mountains and Greenwater Range abut the Funeral Mountains on the north, also at the southern terminus of the Amargosa Range. The Amargosa River turns south-southwest, around the three sub-ranges, then northwest into Death Valley. The Owlshead Mountains are to the south across the Amargosa River and its steep descent into Death Valley.

Features

The range reaches an elevation of 6,384 feet (1,946 m) above sea level at Funeral Peak. Dante's View and Coffin Peak lie at the northern end of the range.

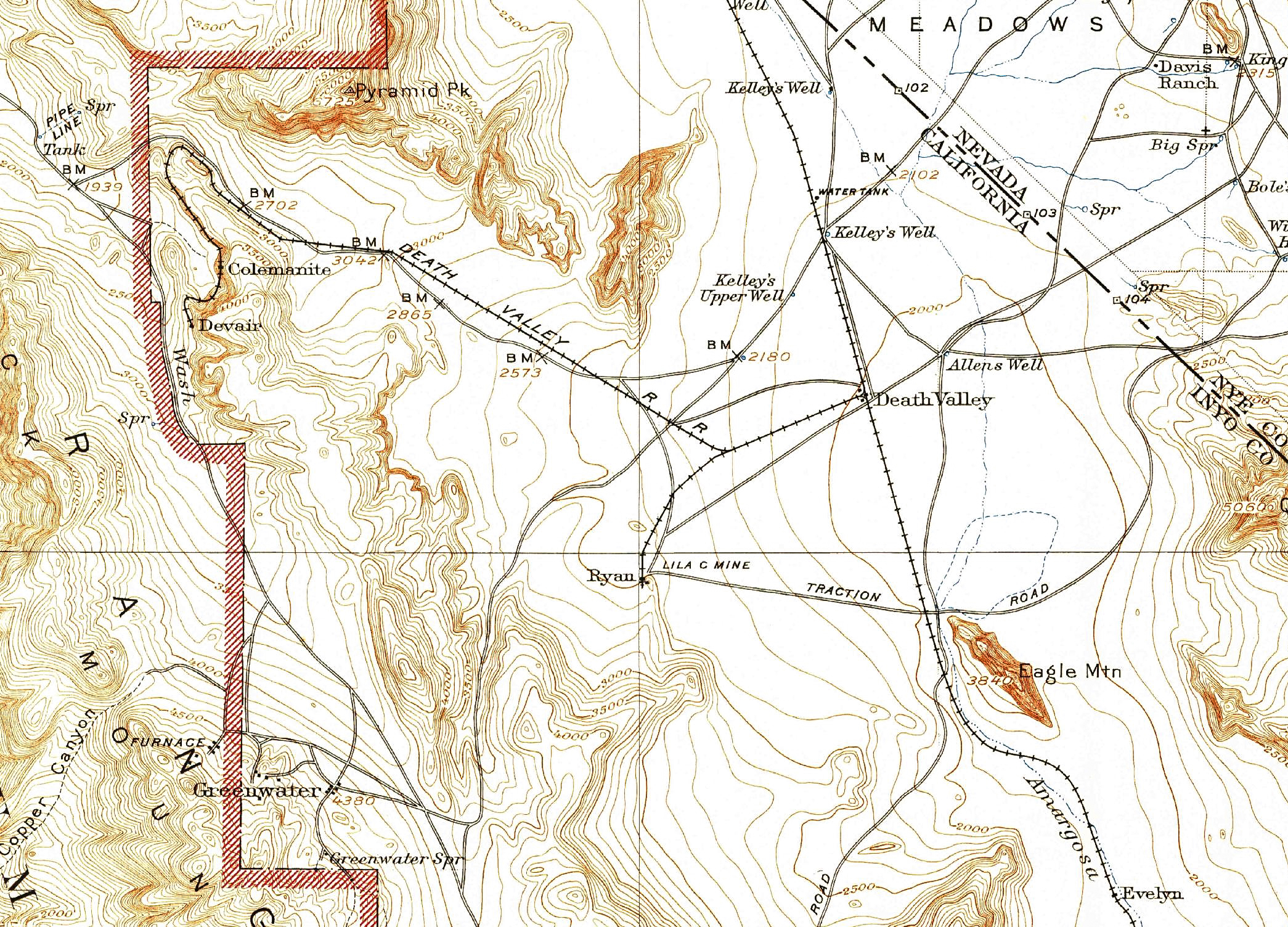
Death Valley Railroad from the Black Mountains to Amargosa Desert

== History ==
The Lila C Mine, of "The Borax King" Francis Marion Smith and his Pacific Coast Borax Company, was developed to mine borax just east of the range. Around 1914 he built the Death Valley Railroad to primarily serve the newer Ryan C. Mine above it within the Black Mountains, with a spur to the Lila C. tracks.

== See also ==
- Gower Gulch (Death Valley)
- Death Valley
- Mountain ranges of the Mojave Desert
