= Grapevine Mountains =

American mountain range

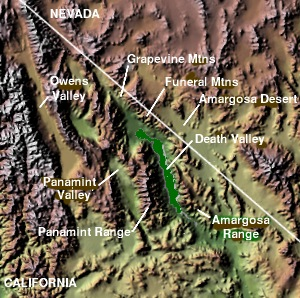
- Grapevine Mountains

Highest point
- Peak: Grapevine Peak
- Elevation: 2,664 m (8,740 ft)

Geography
- Location within California
- Country: United States
- State(s): California and Nevada
- District(s): Inyo County and Nye County
- Range coordinates: 36°57′54.778″N 117°8′57.242″W
- Topo map: USGS Grapevine Peak

The Grapevine Mountains is a mountain range located along the border of Inyo County, California and Nye County, Nevada in the United States. The mountain range is about 22 miles (35 km) long and lies in a northwest-southeasterly direction along the Nevada-California state line. The range reaches an elevation of 8,738 feet (2,663 m) at Grapevine Peak, near Phinney Canyon on the Nevada side. Daylight Pass is at the southern end of the range. Most of the Grapevine Mountain chain is in Death Valley National Park.

The range was named for the wild grapes in the area.

== See also ==
- Mountain ranges of the Mojave Desert
