= Silver Valley =

Silver Valley may refer to:

== Places ==
=== Australia ===
- Silver Valley, Queensland, a locality in the Tablelands Region

=== Canada ===
- Silver Valley, Alberta

=== United States ===
- Silver Valley Unified School District, California
  - Silver Valley High School, California
- Silver Valley, Idaho, a.k.a. the Coeur d'Alene Mining District
- Silver Valley, North Carolina

== Other ==
- Silver Valley (film), a 1927 American Western film
