= Desert Mountain League =

American high school athletic league

The Desert Mountain League is a high school athletic league that is part of the CIF Southern Section. Member schools are located around the high desert of California, covering the very sparsely populated regions from Acton in northern Los Angeles County, San Bernardino County, the eastern edge of Kern County, Inyo County and Mono County.

== Members ==
- Boron High School -- Boron, California
- Desert Christian High School -- Lancaster, California
- Lone Pine High School -- Lone Pine, California
- Mammoth High School -- Mammoth Lakes, California
- Mojave High School -- Mojave, California
- Silver Valley High School -- Yermo, California
- Vasquez High School -- Acton, California
