= Calico Mountains (California) =

Mountain range in California, United States

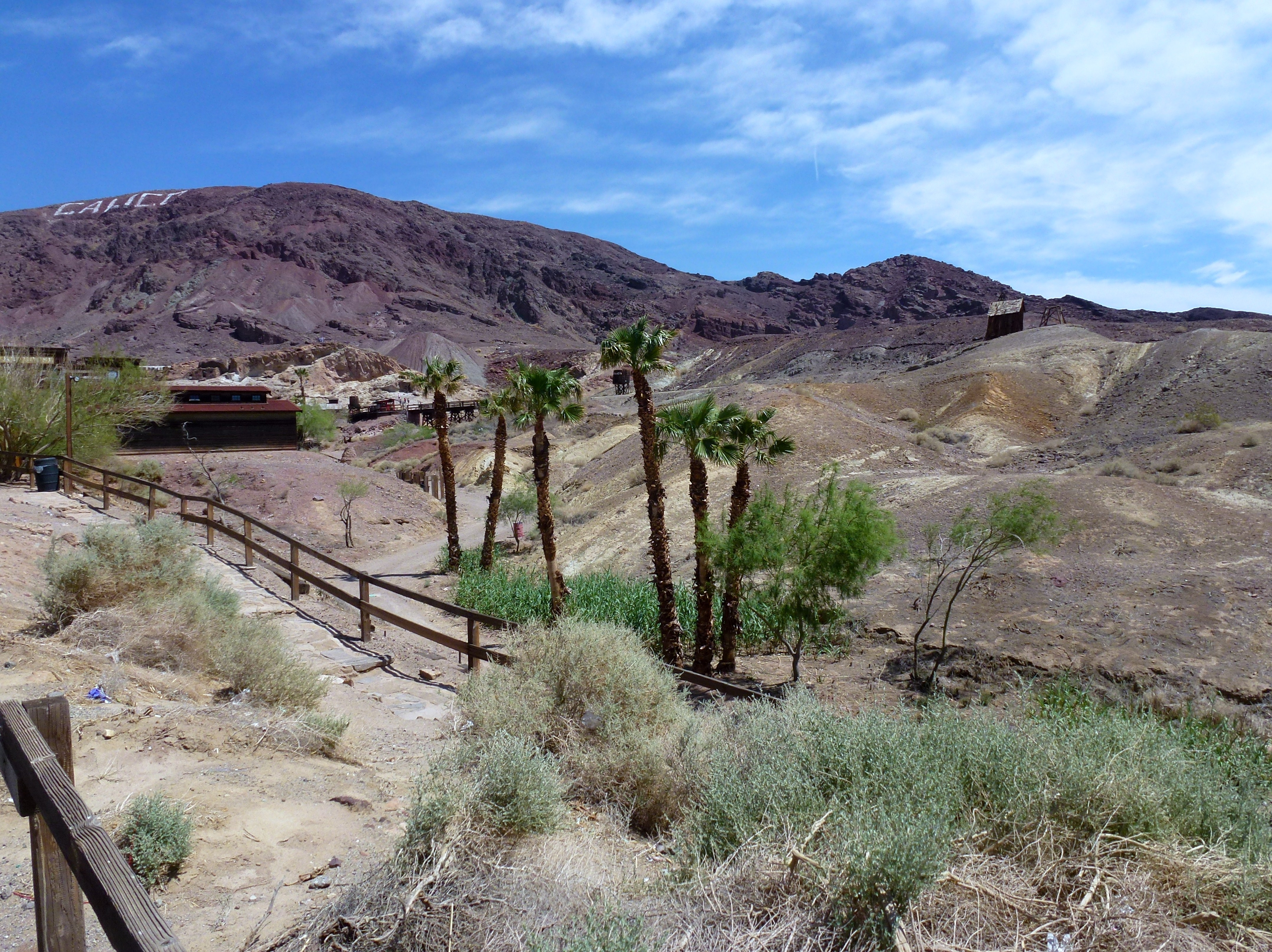
- Calico Mountains behind Calico Ghost Town.

Highest point
- Peak: Calico Peak
- Elevation: 4,491 feet (1,369 m)

Geography
- Location within California
- Country: United States
- State: California
- Region: Mojave Desert
- District(s): San Bernardino County & Inyo County
- Features: Calico Early Man Site; Rainbow Basin; Calico Ghost Town
- Range coordinates: 34°58′25″N 116°50′36″W
- Topo map(s): USGS Salsberry Peak, Yermo

The Calico Mountains of California are a mountain range located in the Mojave Desert. The range spans San Bernardino and Inyo counties in California.

== Geography ==
The Calico Mountains are geologically colorful range that lie in a northwest-southeast direction, and are located just north of Barstow and Yermo, and of Interstate 15.

Historic Pickhandle Pass and Jackhammer Gap lie at the northern end of the mountains on Fort Irwin Road, with the Fort Irwin Military Reservation nearby. The Calico Mountains have been active in California mining history.

=== Peaks ===
Calico Peak, the highest point, is 4,491-foot (1,369 m) in elevation, in the San Bernardino County portion of the range (N 34.995259 and W -116.838369).

=== Features ===
The Rainbow Basin geologic feature, in the Bureau of Land Management managed Rainbow Basin Natural Area, is just north of Barstow.

Calico Ghost Town is located in the Yermo Hills (Calico Hills) at the western edge of the Calico Mountains, north of Yermo.

The Calico Early Man Site is a claimed Paleo-Indians lithic workshop for Stone tools and a simple quarry archaeological site in the mountains also.

== Architectural stone ==
Stone from the Calico Mountains was used in the interior of the 1968 Volcano House at nearby Newberry Springs.

== See also ==
Calico Mountains namesakes

- Calico and Odessa Railroad
- Calico Early Man Site
- Calico Ghost Town
- Calico Peaks
- Calico Print—publication

Local history

- Borate and Daggett Railroad ( site )
- Waterloo Mining Railroad ( site )
- Francis Marion Smith ( mining )

Related

- Mountain ranges of the Mojave Desert
- Protected areas of the Mojave Desert
