= Calico and Odessa Railroad =

Heritage railroad in California, US

Coordinates: 34°56′57″N 116°51′50″W

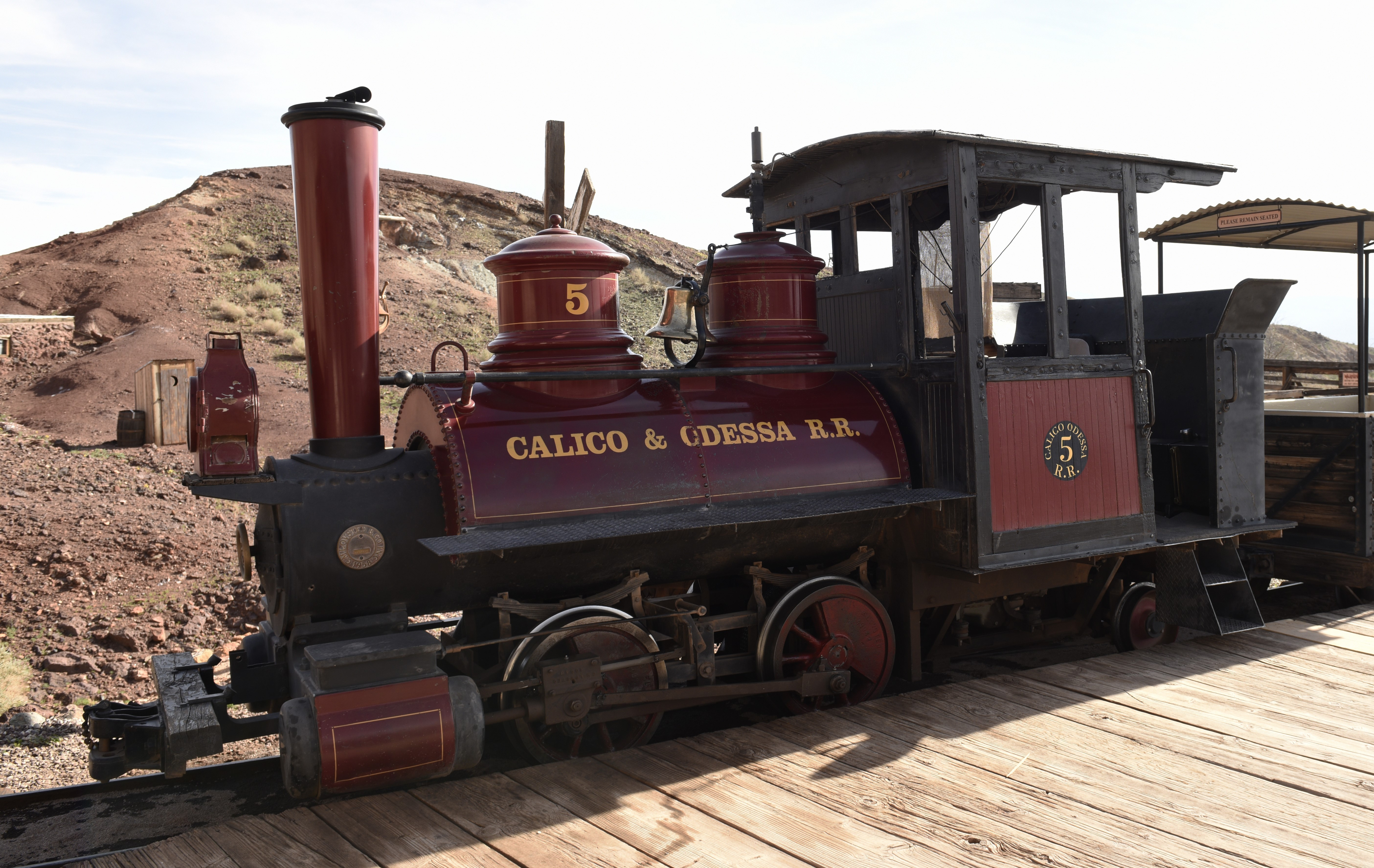
Calico & Odessa Railroad Engine No.5

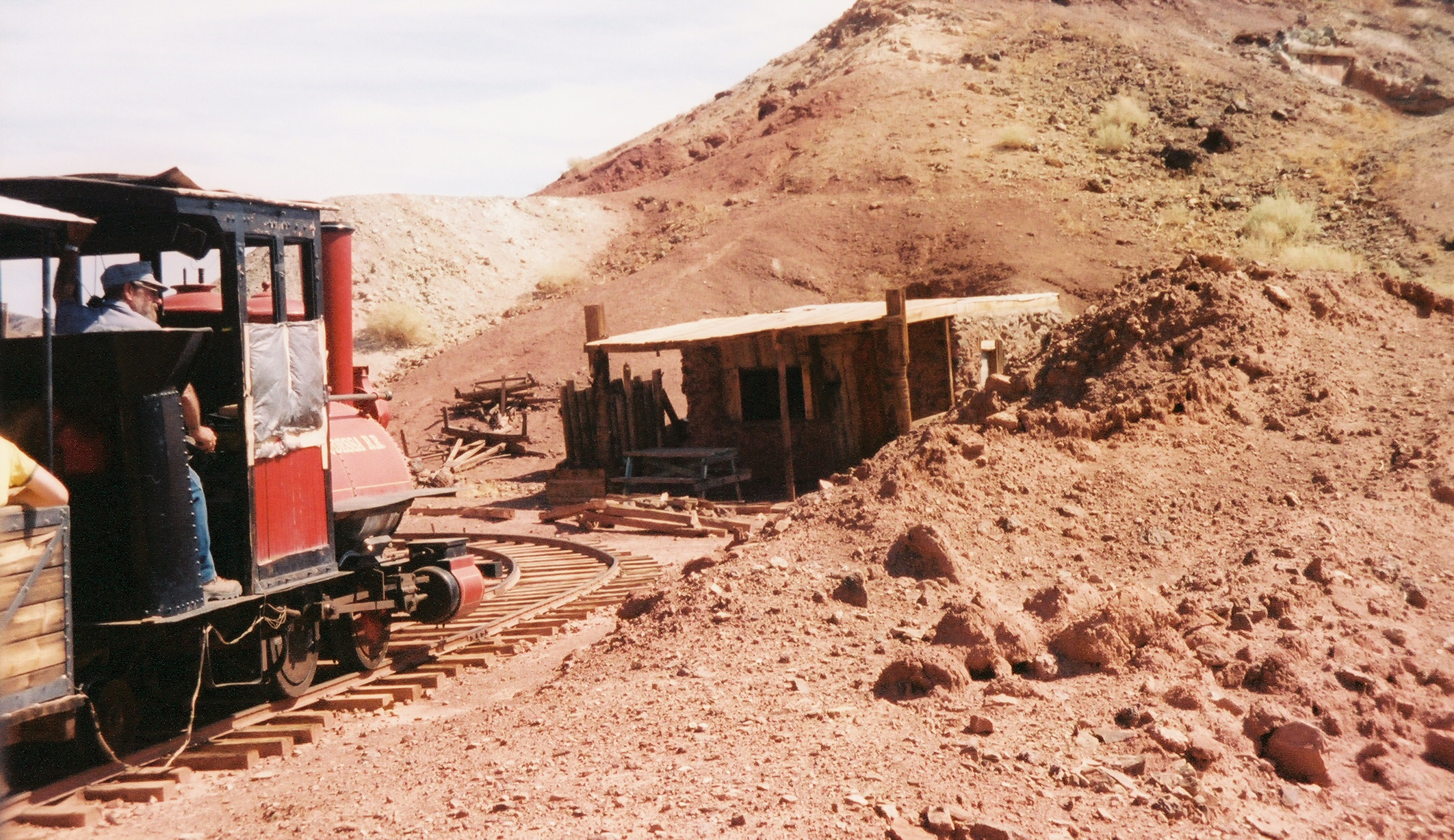
Train through old mines in Calico, California

The Calico & Odessa Railroad is a 2 ft 6 in (762 mm) narrow gauge heritage railroad in the ghost town of Calico, California, headquartered in Yermo, California. It was named for the town and mountain range of Calico and the nearby Odessa Canyon.

It is a remake of the 3 ft (914 mm) narrow gauge Waterloo Mining Railroad, the original narrow gauge railroad line that hauled silver ore (and later borax) from Calico to the mills of Daggett in the 1880s, although the present-day tracks do not follow the trackbed of the original one.

The railroad, like Calico itself, is now operated as a San Bernardino county historic park. Visitors to the park may take a short ride on the railroad for a fee.

== See also ==
- List of heritage railroads in the United States
