= Susan Lendroth =

American writer

Susan Lendroth is a communications professional and a children's author.

== Bibliography ==
- Old Manhattan Has Some Farms, Charlesbridge Publishing, to be released August, 2014
- Calico Dorsey: Mail Dog of the Mining Camps, Tricycle Press, an imprint of Random House, 2010.
- Maneki Neko: The Tale of the Beckoning Cat, Shen's Books, 2010.
- Ocean Wide, Ocean Deep, Tricycle Press, an imprint of Random House, 2008.
- Why Explore?, Tricycle Press, an imprint of Random House, 2005.

== General references ==
- Sacramento Bee, September 6, 2010, Calico Dorsey review
- BookDragon, Smithsonian Asian Pacific American Program, August 5, 2010, Maneki Neko review
- Rutgers University Project on Economics and Children, Ocean Wide, Ocean Deep review
- Cosmic Log, MSNBC.com, December 9, 2005, Why Explore? review
