= Mohave and Milltown Railway =

Former mining railroad in Arizona, US

Overview
- Headquarters: Los Angeles, California
- Locale: Arizona; northeast of Needles, California
- Dates of operation: 1903–1904

Technical
- Track gauge: 3 ft (914 mm)

The Mohave and Milltown Railway was a 3 ft (914 mm) narrow gauge private railroad built in 1903 to serve the Leland Gold Mine near Oatman, Arizona, US. The railway was incorporated in 1903 and construction of the 17-mile (27 km) line was completed that same year. The railway started on the Arizona side of the Colorado River, across the stateline from Needles, California. From the Colorado River the railway went northeast through Milltown and terminated at the Leland Mine, Vivian Mine and the Midnight Mine (near Oatman).

The railway hauled ore from the mines near Oatman to the mill at Milltown.

The railway was operating for only one year when several washouts in September and October 1904 damaged six miles (10 km) of the railway and led to its abandonment. The rails were removed in 1912, the same year that Arizona became a state.

== Mohave and Milltown Railroad Trails ==
Seven miles of the abandoned railway grade are preserved by the Bureau of Land Management as the Mohave and Milltown Railroad Trails.

== Historical timeline ==
- March 16, 1903 – Incorporated
- June 27, 1903 – Materials for railway construction arrive by ferry boat from Needles.
- July 8, 1903 – Grading commences
- September 1, 1903 – Laying rails
- September 30, 1903 – Construction completed
- September/October 1904 – Track damaged by washouts and line abandoned
- 1912 – Track was removed

== Motive Power ==
There were four engines that worked the line:

- No. 1 was a Porter (s/n 2970) 0-6-0ST built in December 1903.
- The second engine was also a Porter-built 0-6-0ST engine (s/n 962), from the former Waterloo Mining Railroad at Calico.
- A 4-6-0 tender engine from the Chateaugray Ore & Iron Works was also used on the line. After the M&M was shut down, the engine was left stranded when part of the line was washed out near U.S. Highway 66 and was left there to serve as a reminder of the old railroad to the hikers that walked around there, but no photographs have been taken of it there. It was recently dumped into the Mojave River near Needles to be used as an embankment against flood erosion.
- A fourth engine came from the Los Angeles & Redondo Railroad, in the form of a Porter 0-4-2T locomotive (s/n 908).

== See also ==
- List of defunct Arizona railroads
