= Calico Peaks =

Mountains in the Mojave Desert of California, United States

- Location within California

Highest point
- Peak: Calico Peak
- Elevation: 4,542 ft (1,384 m) NAVD 88
- Coordinates: 34°59′44″N 116°50′18″W

Geography
- Country: United States
- State: California
- Region: Mojave Desert
- District(s): San Bernardino County & Inyo County
- Range coordinates: 35°59′04″N 116°29′01″W
- Parent range: Calico Mountains
- Topo map(s): USGS Salsberry Peak, Yermo

The Calico Peaks are geologically and historically colorful mountains in the Calico Mountains Range in the Mojave Desert of San Bernardino County and Inyo County, California. They are located just north of Barstow, Yermo, and Interstate 15.

== Peaks ==
Calico Peak is 4,542 feet (1,384 m) in elevation in the San Bernardino County portion.

== Features ==
The Rainbow Basin geologic feature, in the Bureau of Land Management-managed Rainbow Basin Natural Area, and Calico Ghost Town are located below the Calico Peaks in the Yermo Hills. The Calico Early Man Site, a prehistoric Native American archaeological site, is in the mountains also.
