= Silver Valley High School =

Coordinates: 34°54′01″N 116°53′18″W

Location
- 35484 Daggett/Yermo Rd; Yermo, CA 92398

Information
- Type: Public high school
- Established: 1979
- School district: Silver Valley Unified School District
- Principal: Mike Meyer
- Staff: 22.72 (FTE)
- Grades: 9–12
- Enrollment: 369 (2022–2023)
- Student to teacher ratio: 16.24
- Colors: Blue, silver and white
- Mascot: Trojan
- Athletic Facility: Civic Stadium
- Website: https://svhs.svusdk12.net/

Silver Valley High School is a public high school in Yermo, California, in the High Desert of Southern California. The school is in the Silver Valley Unified School District.

== Academic statistics ==
The school serves an area of approximately 3,345 square miles (8,660 km^{2}), equivalent in size to the combined states of Rhode Island and Delaware. It provides educational services to the communities of Calico, Daggett, Fort Irwin, Ludlow, Newberry Springs and Yermo. Many of the families who live in the valley work in agriculture, railroading, trucking, local businesses, or on military bases. Sixty-five percent of the families are military or military-related.

General information

- Total students (as of 2009): 533
- Full-time teachers: 27
- Student/teacher ratio: 18:1

Race distribution

- Asian: 5%
- Black: 18%
- Hispanic: 20%
- Native American: 1%
- White/Other: 53%

Hall of Fame

- Johntavious "Jay" Jones # 7 Football C'15
- Brian Ili #2 Football
- Dauntarius "Will" Williams #8 Football, Track

Student graduation data (2005–2006)

- Number of 12th grade graduates: 59
- Number of 12th grade graduates who also completed UC/CSU courses: 18

Student dropouts (2005–2006)

- Number of dropouts: 4

Staff (2006–2007)

- Number of full-time paraprofessional staff: 5
- Number of full-time office/clerical staff: 5
- Number of full-time other staff: 4
- Number of part-time other staff: 5

Select enrollment (2006–2007 data)

- Enrollment in algebra or algebra II: 78
- Enrollment in advanced math course: 121
- Enrollment in first-year chemistry: 73
- Enrollment in first-year physics: 20
- Career-technical education enrollment: 216

== Facilities ==
School Technology Infrastructure (2006–2007 data)

- Number of computers used for instructionally-related purposes: 235
- Number of classrooms or other instructional settings with internet access: 28
