= Waterloo Mining Railroad =

Historic mining railroad in the southern Mojave Desert of California

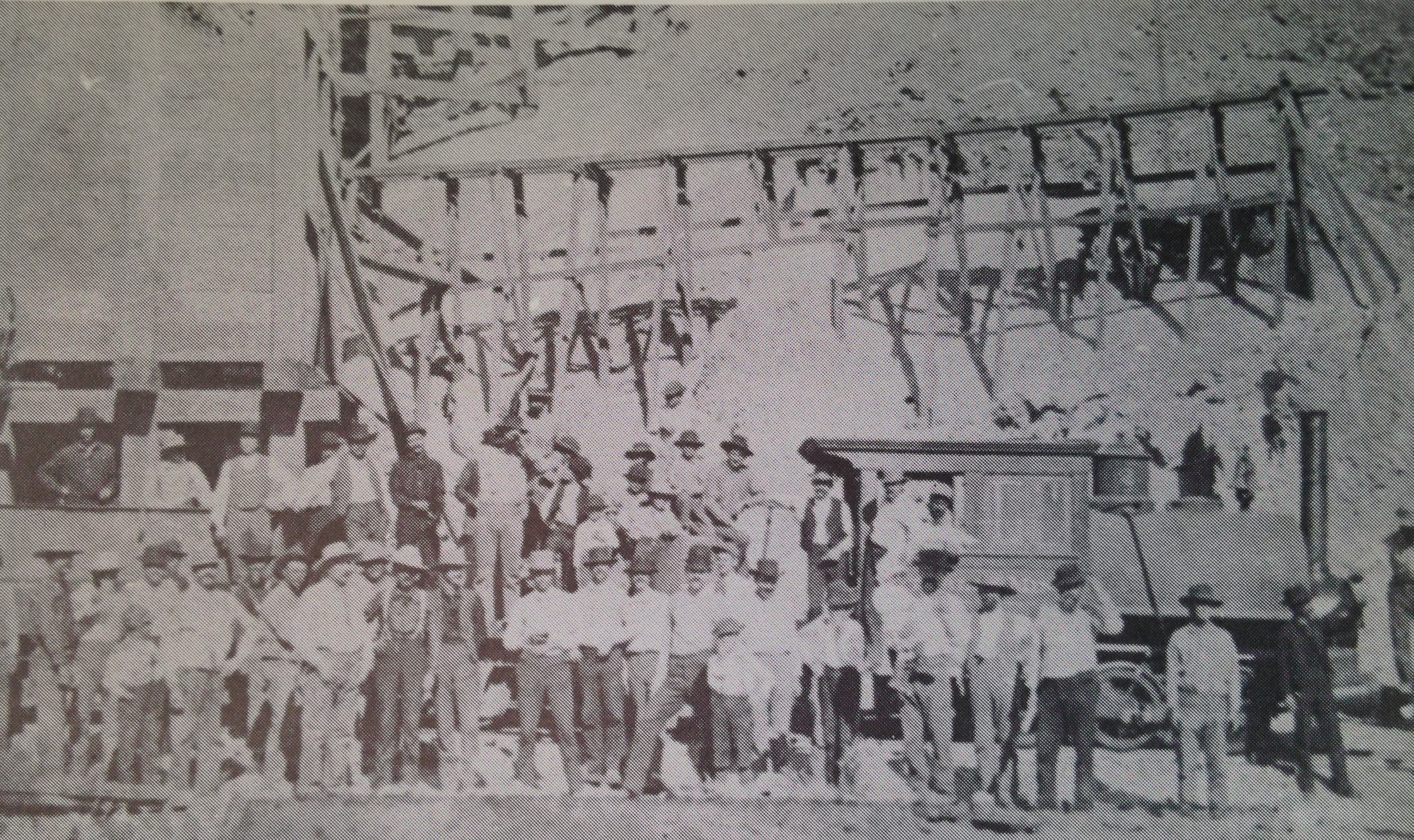
Mining crew at the Silver King Mine in Calico. The engine shown is Calico R.R. #2 'Emil'.

The Waterloo Mine Railroad, also known as the Calico Railroad or Daggett-Calico Railroad, was a 3 ft (914 mm) narrow gauge railroad built to carry silver ore from the mines in the Calico Mountains north of Calico to the mills located at Elephant Mountain near Daggett, California, from 1888 to 1903.

The American Borax Company leased, and later bought, a small length of the railroad to use for their borax mining operations near Lead Mountain in 1901, and the line managed to last for about another six years afterwards. During this time, it was referred to as the American Borax Company Railroad (or A.B.C. Railroad), and the Columbia Mine Railroad.

== History ==
=== Silver mining ===
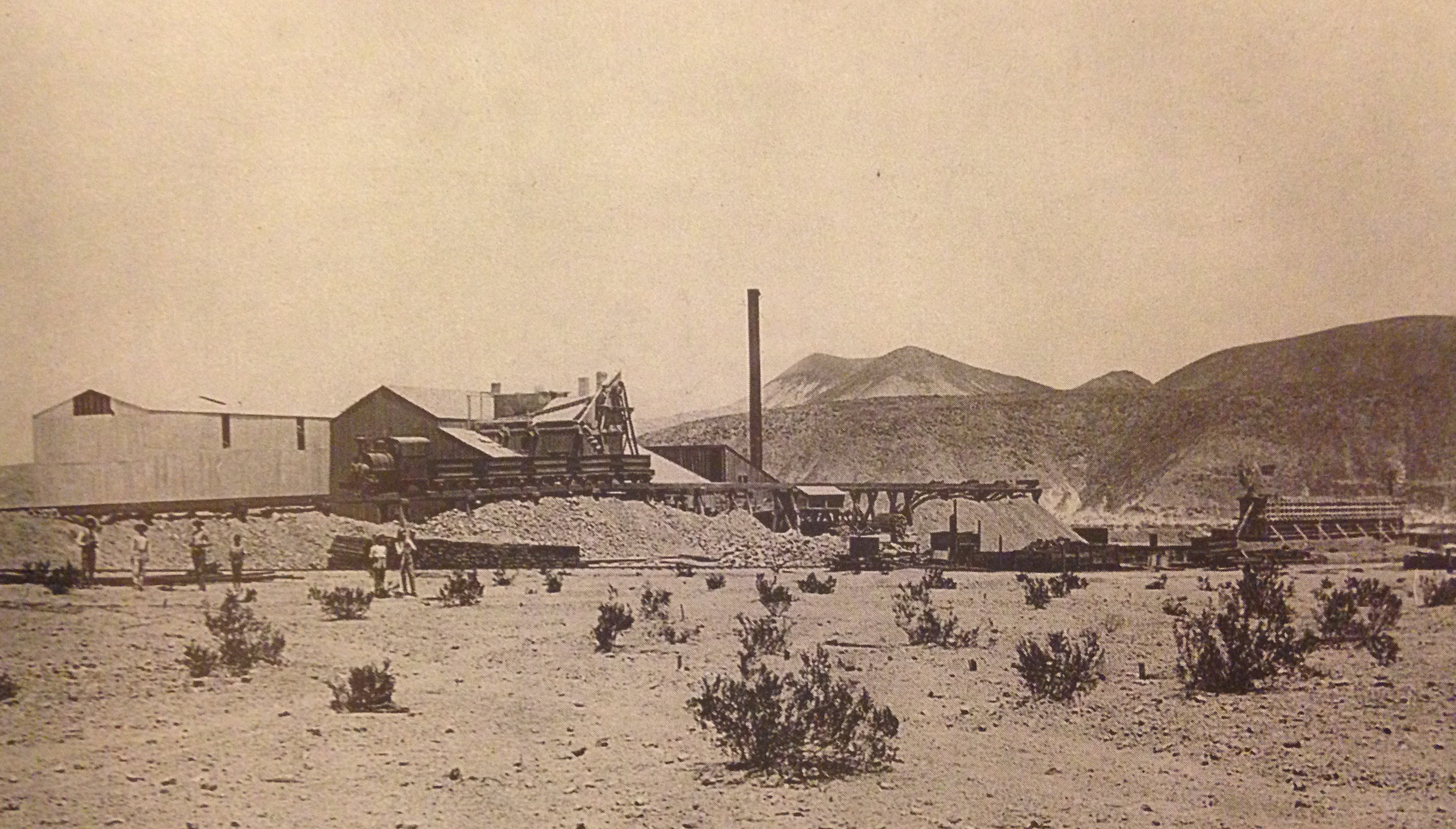
The Columbia Mill near Daggett, California, where Calico R.R. No. 1 'Uncle Dan' bought the borax shales mined from Lead Mountain to be processed.

In the 1880s, Calico was one of the most successful silver mining towns in Southern California, with a large town population of about 1,200. It had two silver mines, the Waterloo and Silver King, which produced about over $1,000,000 worth of silver ore in just 14 months. The Southern Pacific Railroad built a railroad line to the nearest town of Daggett about 10 miles (16 km) away, to become involved in the silver mining business, and in return, supply the residents of Calico with goods, timber and whatever else was needed to keep the mines going.

The Oro Grande Mining Company owned most of the silver mines in and around Calico, and was usually responsible for the transfer of the silver ore from the mines to Waterloo Mills near Daggett, and for the export of the silver products from there. Hauling silver ore was about $2.50 per ton, but production was limited by the amount that could be hauled. Oro Grande had their own 14-mule team hauling the silver ore from the mines to the processing plants at Elephant Mountain near Daggett, but thought they could do better with a shortline from Calico to Daggett. In March 1885, plans were put forward for a standard gauge line to be built from the junction at Daggett, to branch off to the silver mines and mills, and connect with Calico to provide a direct rail service with trains incoming from Barstow and Needles. However, the Calico mines were already showing signs of declining production, and the rising costs of transportation and the falling prices of silver made the project unfeasible. The plans for the shortline were soon abandoned.

==== Railroad ====
By 1887 production of silver ore at the mines had increased sufficiently for the Waterloo Mills at Daggett to upgrade their operations to a 60-stamp mill, powered by electricity and water from the Mojave River. It was decided that a railroad had to be built to keep up with the increase in demand for ore. The Calico Railroad was built for 11 miles (18 km) long starting at the Waterloo Mine, about 2 to 3 miles (3.2 to 4.8 km) to the west of Calico. From there, the line went straight down for about 11 miles (18 km) before looping around Elephant Mountain at a steady rising grade before finally reaching the Waterloo Mill on the side of the mountain facing towards Daggett. A spur was later added to the Silver King Mine in Calico in 1889. The railroad was built up Wall Street Canyon, where at the end was a huge ore bin which was fed ore from the mine high above the town by either animal-drawn ore wagons or mine carts.

The line never actually reached Daggett, but luckily the town was right over the river from the mill at Elephant Mountain, so whenever something needed to be shipped over to Daggett, either the local wagon roads took the goods to the town or people walked across the riverbed whenever it was dry. The line also hauled a few passengers, but the line never owned any carriages, so people rode in the ore wagons in between Calico or Daggett, or miners would ride them from Calico to wherever they worked.

The declining demands and prices of silver forced the Calico mines to go into decline, and in March 1892 the Waterloo Mine was closed down, followed by the Silver King later on in 1896, and the Calico Railroad ceased operations for a while. The locomotives and rolling stock were stored at the engine house located near to the Waterloo Mill, on the north-west side of the Mojave River close to the location of the current road bridge linking Daggett and Yermo. Later in 1899, D.D. Connell and Marcus Pluth agreed to lease the properties of the Waterloo Mining Company, including the railroad, to haul whatever profitable amount of silver was left in the mines. Silver ore was hauled from the Waterloo Mine down towards Elephant Mountain, where the silver was processed in the original 16-stamp mill the company had erected since Calico's early days in 1883. The lease for the silver operations lasted from 1899 until 1903.

=== Borax mining ===
In 1897, the Pacific Coast Borax Company began constructing the Borate and Daggett Railroad to link the nearby borax mines of Borate to the standard-gauge railway at Daggett, and were short on locomotives to run the line. They leased one of the saddle-tank engines (No. 2, "Emil") from the Waterloo Mining Company to aid in the construction of the new line. The locomotive was said to have been rather slippy on the steep grade ascending to Borate, and was used for only a few months until the arrival of PCB's first locomotive and "Emil" was sent back to Waterloo.

==== American Borax Company ====
In 1899, the American Borax Company bought mining claims at Lead Mountain, about four miles (6.4 km) west of Calico, to mine boric acid and plotted to build a railroad to reach Daggett across the river where they had their processing plants. American Borax agreed with the Waterloo Mining Company and D.D. Connell (who by then was also leasing the line from Waterloo Mining along with fellow miner Marcus Pluth, to transport the last of the ore from Waterloo Mine in 1899) to reserve running rights on the line to allow their trains to use the same track in between the junctions going towards Calico and the borax mine at Lead Mountain (named "Columbia"). They had also leased the line's first locomotive "Uncle Dan," to operate the borax trains outgoing from Lead Mountain.

The line was extended from the mill branch at Elephant Mountain to cross the Mojave River on a Pratt through truss bridge before pulling into the Columbia Mill on the other side of the river, where the calcining plants were located. Once the boric acid was processed into borax, the train took the ore to the railhead in the town of Daggett where the Atchison, Topeka & Santa Fe Railroad came and took away the borax to sell in the market.

American Borax and D.D. Connell both ran the line for their reasons, until a disastrous train wreck between the two engines at a switch in 1903 happened due to Connell hurrying with his engine (No. 2, "Emil") to get back to Daggett during a storm to terminate his lease. After Connell had been contracted to tear up the rail line towards Calico and all the wooden structures in the town, Waterloo Mining Co. gave full ownership of the railroad to American Borax to use the remainder of the line for the borax traffic from the Columbia Mine at Lead Mountain.

By 1907, the American Borax Company discovered better deposits of borax in the Tick Canyon Formation, about 30 miles (48 km) northwest of Los Angeles. Once they partnered up with fellow borax company, Sterling Borax, to take a hold of the borax claims there, the mining operations at Daggett were shut down and all the mining equipment, even the railroad itself was moved up to Lang, California, and the mining operations of the Calico Mountains ceased to exist.

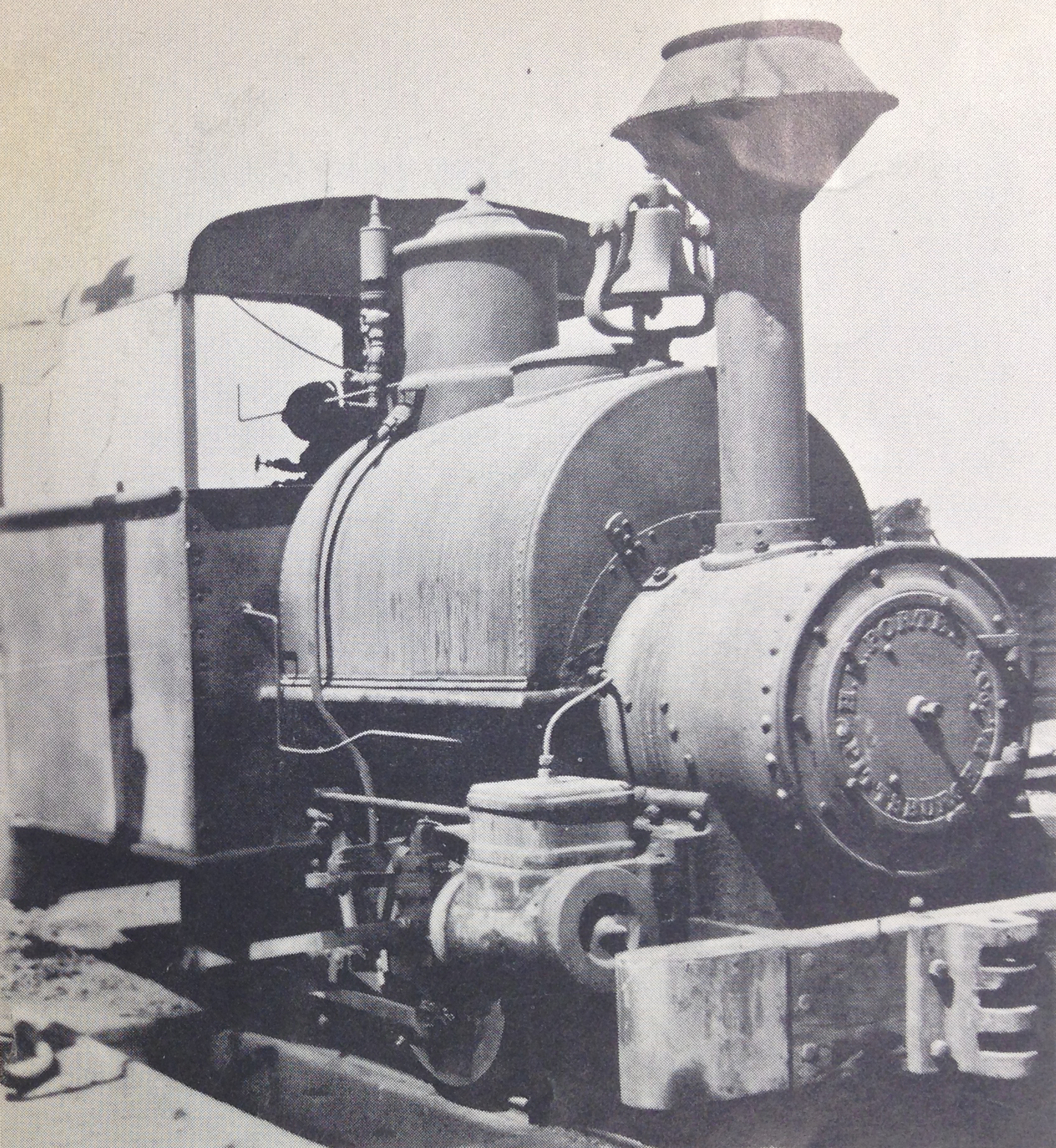
Daggett & Calico/Waterloo Mining Railroad's No. 1 'Uncle Dan'.

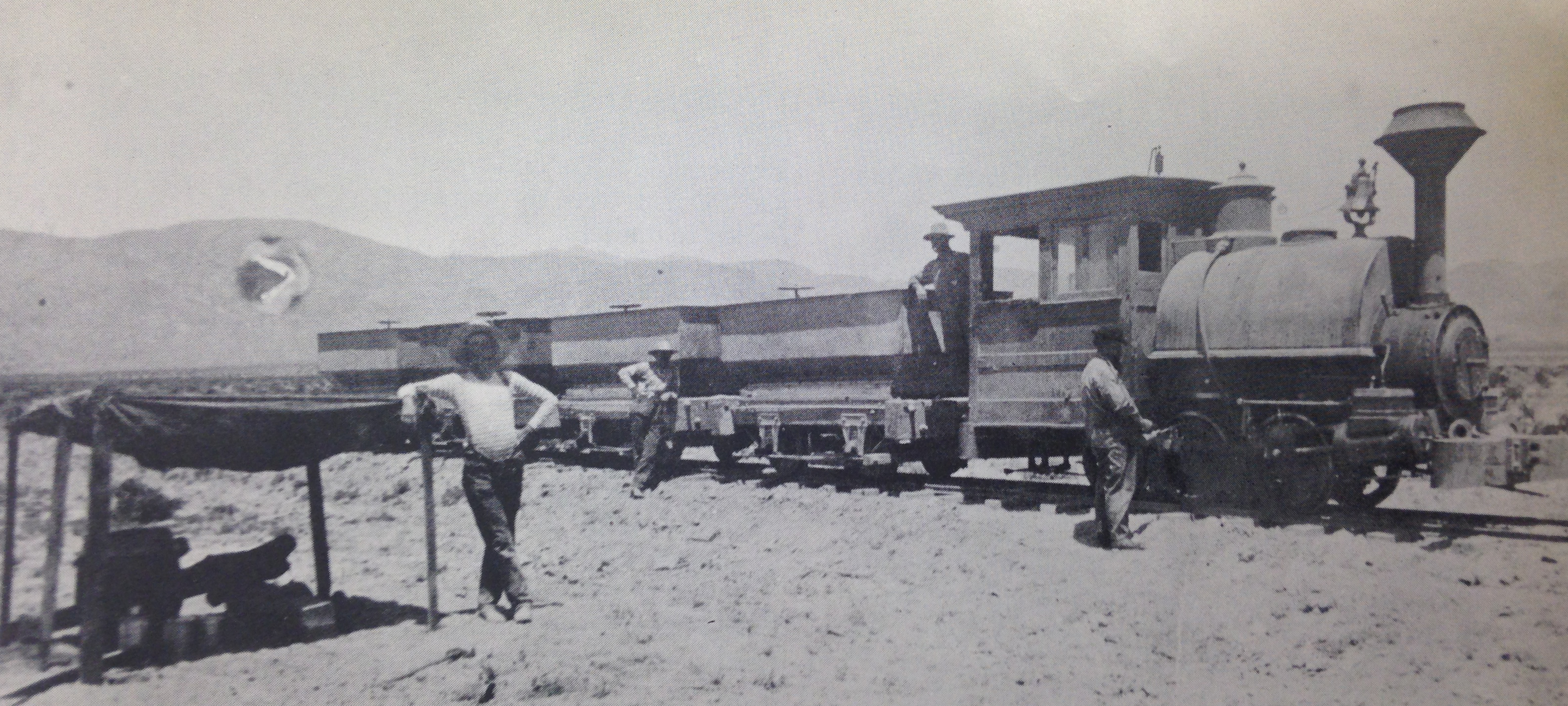
Daggett & Calico/Waterloo Mining Railroad's No. 2 'Emil'.

== Locomotives and rolling stock ==
The Waterloo Mining Railroad only had two engines. Both were built by H.K. Porter, Inc. in 1888 for use on the railway line in between Daggett and Calico. One was called 'Uncle Dan' was an 0-4-0ST (H.K. Porter B-S Class; s/n 937), the other 'Emil' was an 0-6-0ST (H.K. Porter C-S Class; s/n 962). Both were named for the important heads of the mining company and the railroad, Daniel Wells Jr. and Emil Sanger, who was appointed head of the Waterloo Mining Company in 1888 and the one who ordered for the building of the railroad.

They were both used on the line, even after the American Borax Company took over the operations of the railroad. In 1903, 'Emil' was bought by the Mohave and Milltown Railway, and 'Uncle Dan' was left to handle the borax operations alone until about 1907 when the railroad was torn up and moved up to Lang, California to work the mines at Tick Canyon for the Sterling Borax Company.

No records were kept of the two engines being moved away, sold or scrapped from their respective railroads after that. Whether they actually survived scrapping or not is one of the great mysteries surrounding this little-known mining railroad.

Rolling stock consisted of at least four ore wagons built at the Virginia & Truckee Railroad's shops at Carson City, Nevada, along with a water car. American Borax added a further five ore wagons for hauling borax to the roster, these cars' design is of unknown origin.

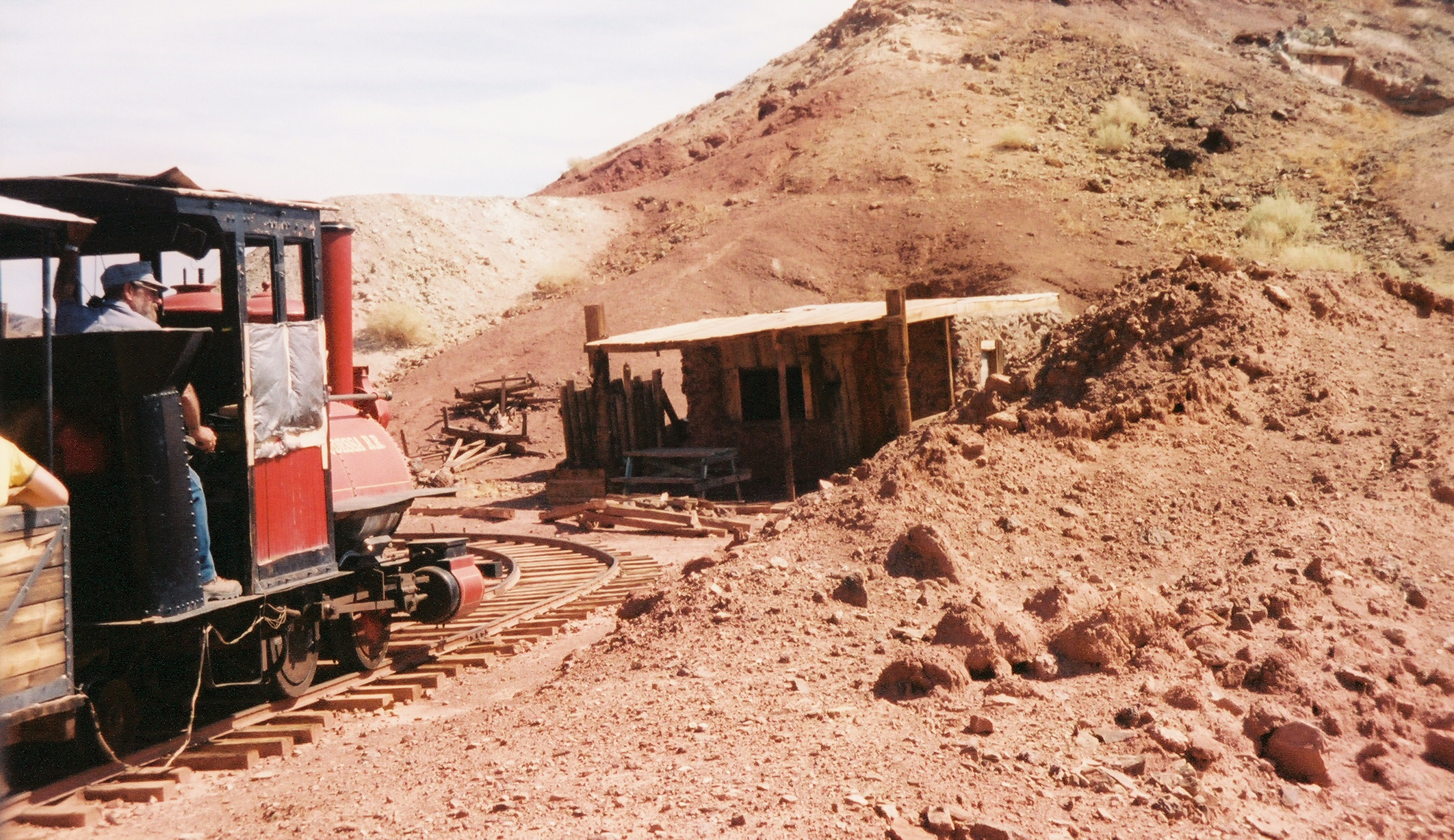
The present-day Calico & Odessa Railroad with its steam-outlined diesel engine puttering about the old mine ruins.

== Legacy ==
The town of Calico was bought and rebuilt from the ground up in 1951 by Walter Knott, the owner of Knott's Berry Farm, as a ghost town tourist attraction. A tourist railroad was planned to be built to revive the history and legacy of the old Waterloo Mining Railroad. The 2 ft 6 in (762 mm) narrow gauge Calico & Odessa Railroad was built by Shafe-Malcom Enterprises in 1954. It loops around one of the mountains nearest to Calico Ghost Town to one of the old silver mine shafts and the site of the former eastern portion of Calico. The line is operated by a single 0-4-2 steam-outline diesel locomotive.

The line today does not follow any of the former trackbed of the Waterloo Mining Railroad. The original line began below at the mouth of Wall Street Canyon, and is now a paved road for tourists to access Calico from Interstate 15.

Some segments of the old railbed can still be traced out in some places in the desert, but much has now been covered by housing developments of Yermo. The best place to see traces of the old line are at the site of the former Waterloo Mine, where a large ore bin had dumped silver ore into the waiting trains below. The old foundations of the mills at Elephant Mountain near Daggett also can still be seen and explored.

== See also ==
- Big Thunder Mountain Railroad
- Calico Mine train ride from Knott’s Berry Farm’s Ghost Town at Knott’s Berry Farm
