= Paul von Klieben =

Artist

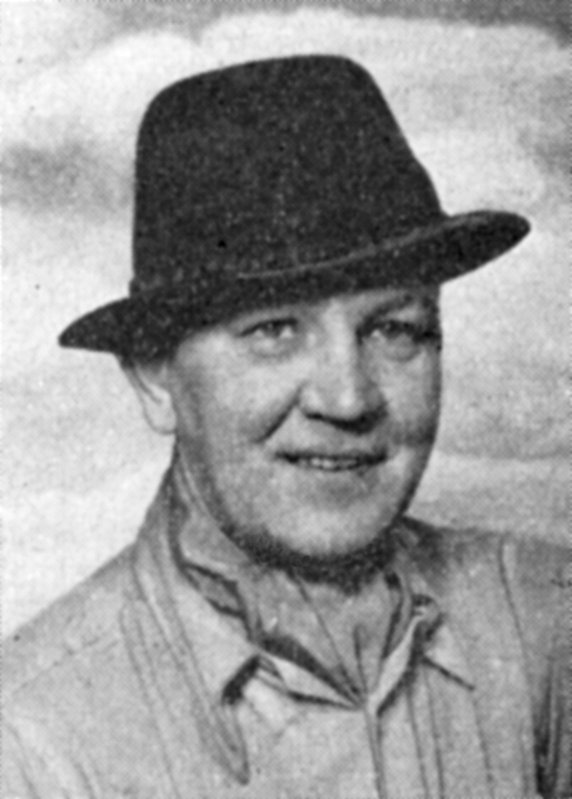
- Born: Paul Anton Kliebenstein; 17 March 1891; Bildstock, Germany
- Died: 14 June 1953 (aged 62)
- Citizenship: American
- Spouse: Elfriede Anna Tack (m. 8 November 1919)

Paul von Klieben (17 March 1891 – 14 June 1953) was a key employee of Walter Knott in the early years of Knott’s Berry Farm and the restoration of the ghost town of Calico, California. He started his career in Chicago as a commercial artist and portrait painter. In 1941, he joined Knott’s Berry Farm in Buena Park, California as a staff artist, then served as art director there from 1943 until 1953. He traveled to ghost towns in the West, and designed most of the Ghost Town section of Knott’s Berry Farm. He created concept art for most of the buildings that were built there. He also drew up floor plans, oversaw the construction of buildings, and even spent some time painting concrete to look like natural rock. His Old West paintings and murals adorned the walls of many structures in the park, and his art was used extensively on menus, brochures, catalogs and other Knott’s documents.

== Early years ==
Paul von Klieben (pronounced “Kleeben”) was born Paul Anton Kliebenstein in Bildstock, Germany on March 17, 1891, the son of Peter Philipp Kliebenstein and Paulina Schaefer. In 1914, at age 22, he came to America. Shortly thereafter, he began working as a commercial artist in Chicago, and later in Detroit. He quickly garnered commissions to paint portraits. He became a naturalized citizen on February 11, 1927.

He married Elfriede Anna Tack on November 8, 1919, in Chicago. She died a decade later, on October 16, 1929. Paul continued to live in Cook County, Illinois for a few more years. In 1933, he was asked by the Chicago World’s Fair to head an art colony of 300-400 artists for both sessions of the fair. There, he met and hired Paul Swartz.

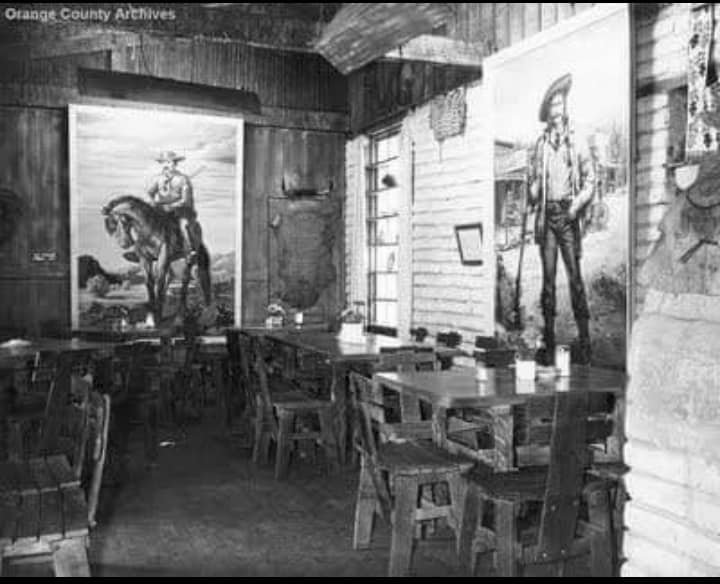
Portraits of Kit Carson and Will Bill Hickock executed by Paul von Klieben hung in the Steak House Restaurant in Ghost Town at Knott’s Berry Farm. Photo courtesy of the Orange County Archives.

Swartz later moved to Hollywood, where he made a living drawing caricatures in nightclubs. By 1935, von Klieben followed him to Los Angeles, and later lived in Topanga Canyon and then Calabasas, California. He was an accomplished portrait artist, executing masterful portraits of a number of Hollywood movie stars of the day and other notable people, such as Edward G. Robinson, Jackie Coogan, Will Rogers, Edsel Ford and Vice President Charles G. Dawes. However, he discovered that when in Hollywood, generating clients there was more a matter of socializing in that superficial society, than in possessing artistic skill. He grew to loathe the type of people he had set himself up to paint.

== Knott’s Berry Farm ==
Meanwhile, Walter Knott had hired another artist on a weekly salary to create the painting for the cyclorama at what would later become Ghost Town at Knott’s Berry Farm. The cyclorama was a 20 x 50-foot, curved mural in the Gold Trails Hotel of a wagon train crossing the desert. The cyclorama had three-dimensional objects in the foreground to add to the effect, along with a three-minute recorded narration. It was animated with lighting effects that transformed the daytime scene into night. The sun set, followed by the moon and stars emerging, creating a full night scene. Unfortunately, the initial artist had been working on painting the mural for nearly a year, with no end in sight, and then quit. Knott approached Swartz about the problem, who suggested von Klieben for the job. Von Klieben finished the mural, and then the rest of project, in just a few weeks.

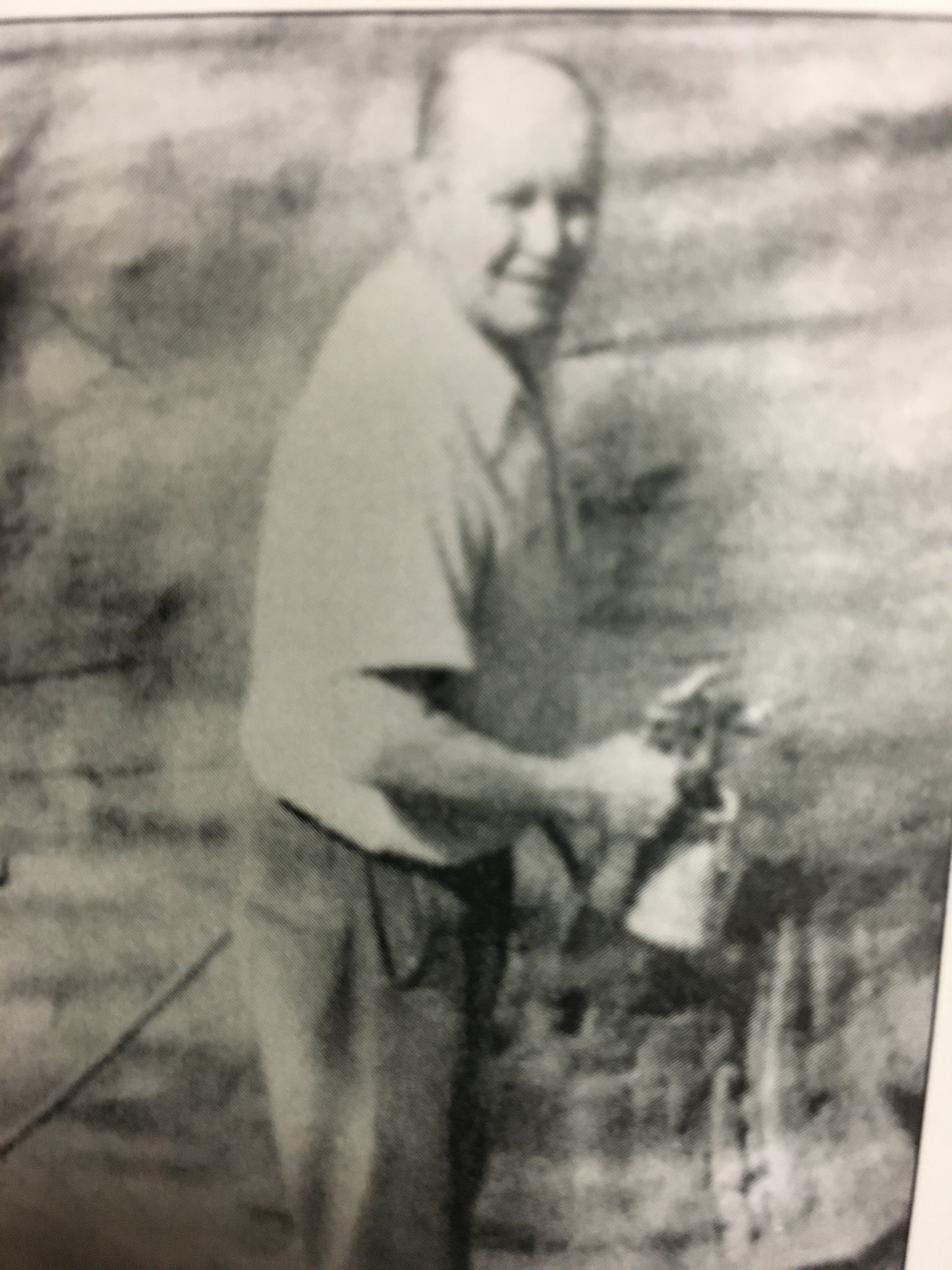
Paul von Klieben spray painting concrete to look like rock at the Gold Mine at Knott's. Photo courtesy of the Orange County Archives.

Von Klieben had apparently been ready for a change, and he and Knott liked each other from the start. Their meeting is described in the book Fabulous Farmer: The Story of Walter Knott and his Berry Farm, by Holmes and Bailey:

When he breathed of Walter Knott’s enthusiasm for the re-creation of the dramatic western pageant, the thing was even more attractive. He sensed success here, as Walter Knott had always sensed success. And Paul was shrewd. When Knott offered him a salary, he refused. “Just give me a place to stay, food while I’m here, and I’ll do your cyclorama,” he said.

“What about money?” Walter asked. “Surely ---”

“If I need money, I’ll ask for it,” Paul replied.

The cyclorama, under the genius of this man, came out a masterpiece. The only concession Paul asked, to which Walter Knott readily agreed, was the exclusive right to manufacture and sell art souvenirs, booklets and paintings on the premise. Von Klieben lived on the farm and had his studio "at the end of the Ghost Town Trail," in "the adobe building which adjoins Ghost Town" that was completed shortly before February 1942 and was constructed of adobe bricks made on the property. This building is likely that which is now used as the entrance to Spurs restaurant.

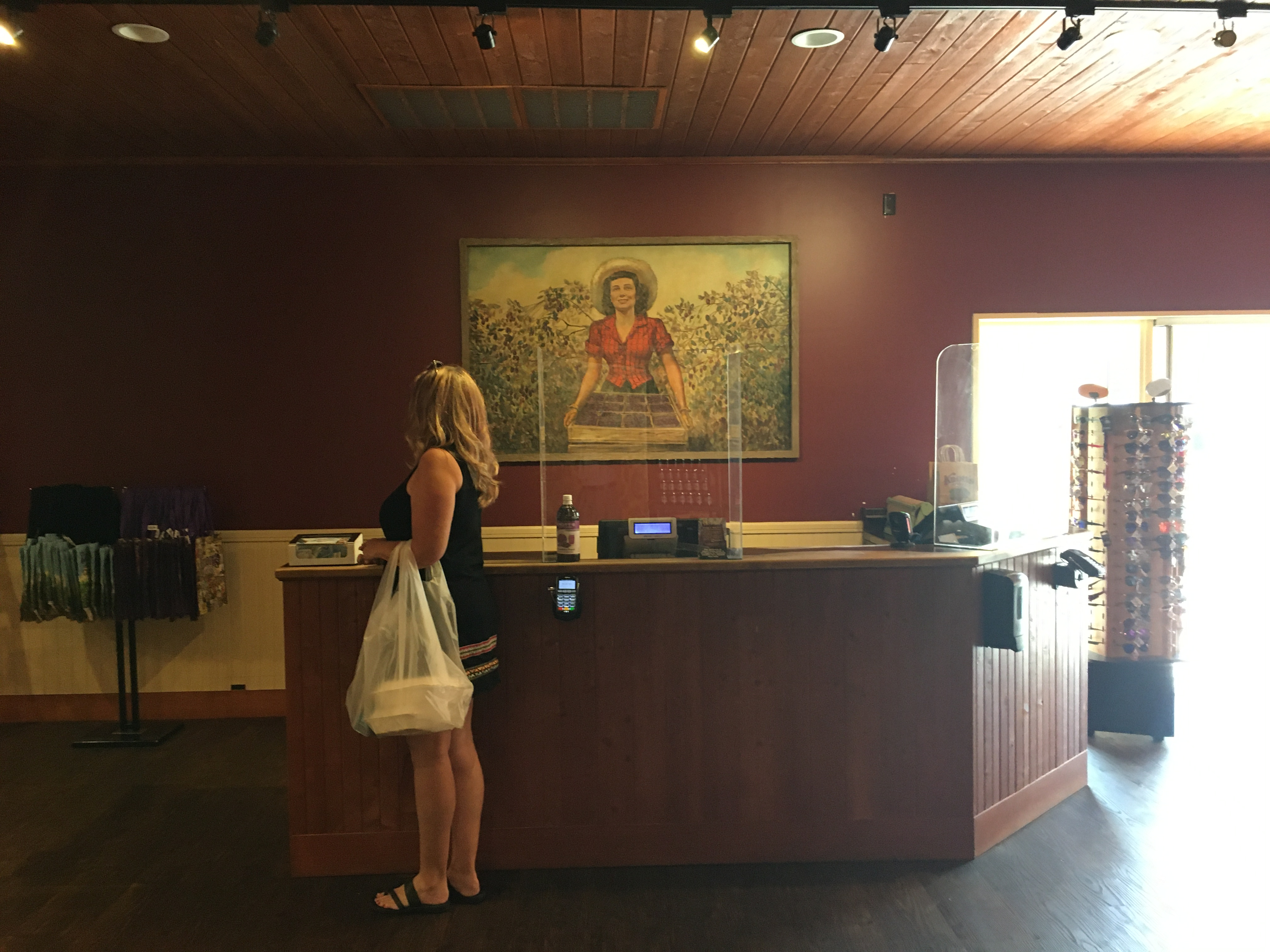
Von Klieben’s portrait of Rachel Elizabeth “Toni” Knott and two of his other large paintings are in Virginia’s Gift Shop at Knott’s Berry farm.

This arrangement with Knott went on for the next 12 years, and would prove to be the most fruitful relationship in the history of Knott’s Berry Farm. Von Klieben was instrumental in all aspects of planning and executing the construction of Ghost Town, as well as the art that adorned Knott’s buildings. In between his efforts for Knott, he created innumerable artistic souvenirs, hand-drawn booklets, and lithographs, which he manufactured and sold to Knott’s for resale to the public at the farm. The relationship worked out for von Klieben. When he died in 1953, he left behind an estate of $100,000. This was at a time when the average annual income in the United States was $4,011, and the price of the average house was $8,200.

The Little Chapel by the Lake at Knott’s opened to an awed public on December 11, 1941. As the audience listened to the recorded narrative, doors slowly opened to reveal von Klieben’s six-foot, eight-inch groundbreaking painting of Christ. This is the first known instance of a theme park using blacklight for effect. As the lighting changed, Christ’s eyes would appear to open. Guests were awed with the effect, and frequently commented that “words cannot describe it.”.

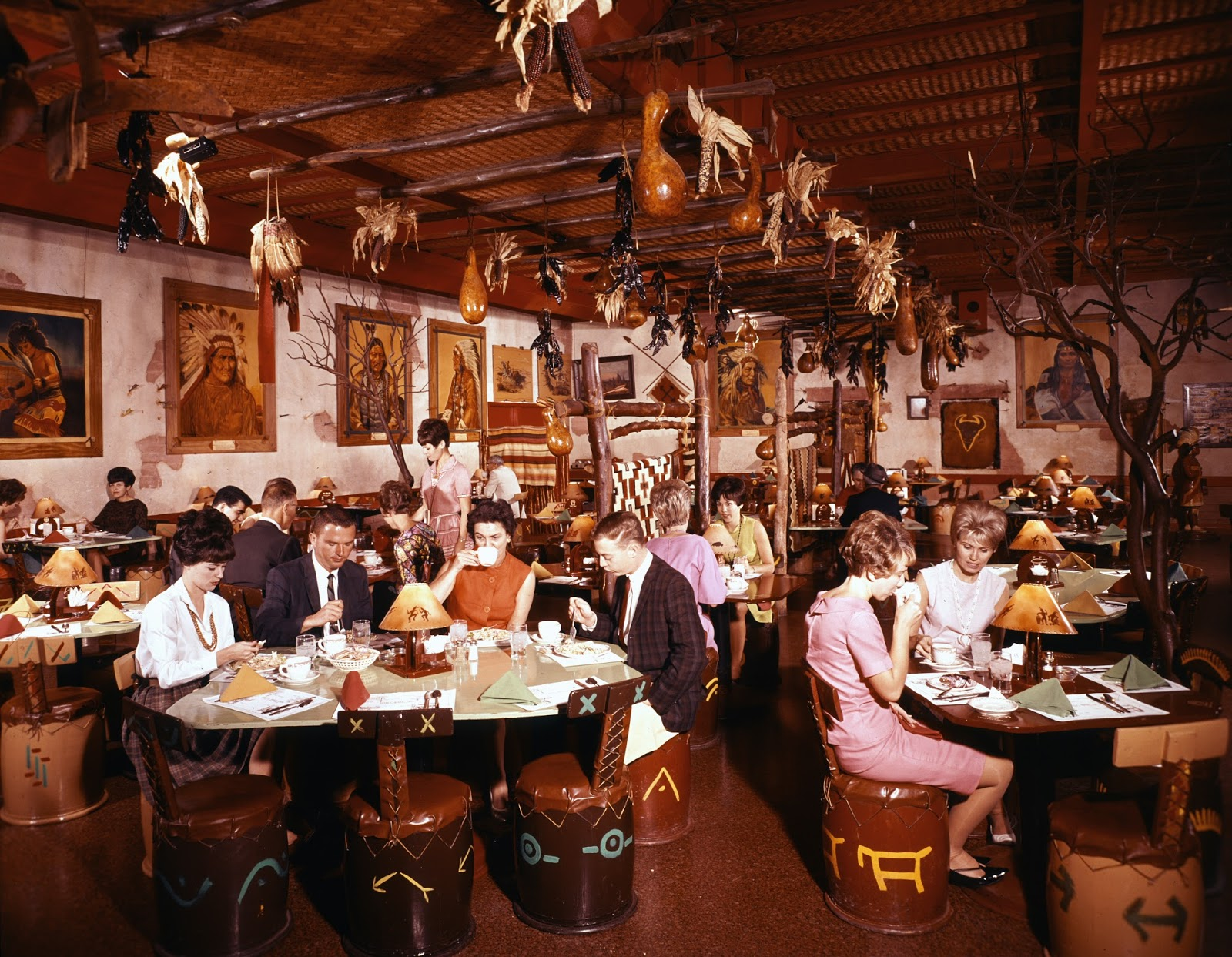
The Indian Room in the Knott’s Steak House was filled with portraits of Native Americans executed by von Klieben. This ca early 1960s photo is courtesy of the Orange County Archives.

Von Klieben traveled to ghost towns in the West, taking photos, and conducted extensive research, which would become the basis for buildings at Knott’s Berry Farm. The first buildings built that were designed by him were the post office and Wells Fargo office at the corner of Main Street and Stage Road. Von Klieben drew concept drawings for numerous other buildings in Ghost Town, such as the Bird Cage Theater, the Bottle House and Music Hall. The Music Hall became home for the spectacular painting “Night Watch,” painted in 1870 by Charles Christian Nahl, which von Klieben had discovered in a San Francisco hotel. He encouraged Walter Knott to buy the painting, which he did. The Knott family donated the painting to the Orange County Museum of Art in 1999.

Knott would tell von Klieben what he had in mind for a project, then von Klieben would retreat to the modest studio-abode that Knott had erected for him. In about 1970, Walter Knott recalled von Klieben this way: “He would work all night. Only the security man would be on the grounds. Then, the next morning, he would lay the sketch on my desk. I wouldn’t see him for several days, so exhausted would he be from having expended himself.”

Von Klieben produced detailed concept art for proposed buildings and also floor plans. He oversaw construction and the process for converting new lumber into weathered-looking boards by the use of burning, sandblasting, scraping, pounding, twisting, painting multiple colors and wire brushing. He also personally painted the concrete in the original Pan for Gold attraction to look like rock.

The covered wagons that von Klieben created were so authentic-looking that they fooled the curator of an eastern museum who visited. The curator offered to buy one of the wagons from Walter Knott. Knott politely declined, and decided not to embarrass the expert by telling him that the wagons were not antiques.

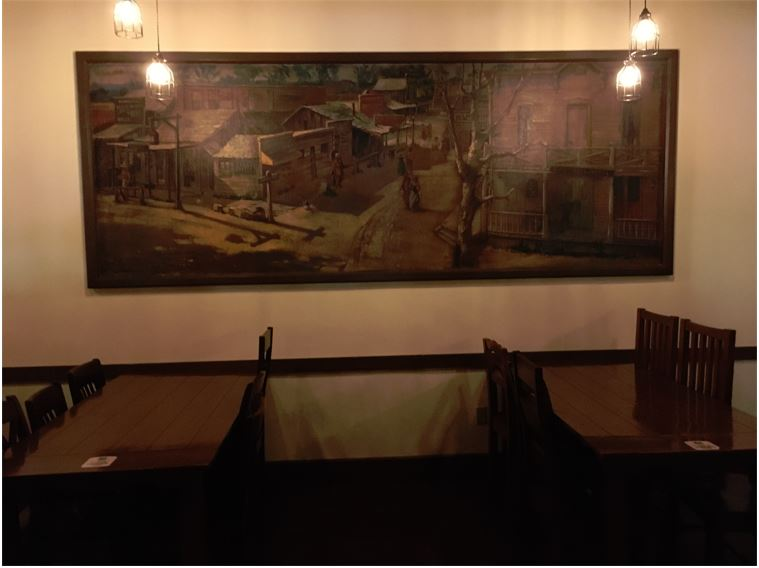
Von Klieben’s painting of Ghost Town at Knott’s hangs in the Chicken Dinner Restaurant there.

== Restoration of Calico, California ==
Walter Knott’s uncle, John Caleb King (1838–1901), was sheriff of San Bernardino County in 1879–1882. King grubstaked two miners who found the richest silver vein in Calico, California. The Silver King Mine is named after him, and it produced $10,000,000 in silver. Later, the price of silver dropped, and by 1896, Calico was a ghost town. In 1915, the price of silver was back up, and a mining company built a cyanide plant to rework the tailings of the Silver King Mine. Walter Knott worked there for a month in 1916, as a carpenter building the redwood cyanide tanks, and never forgot it.

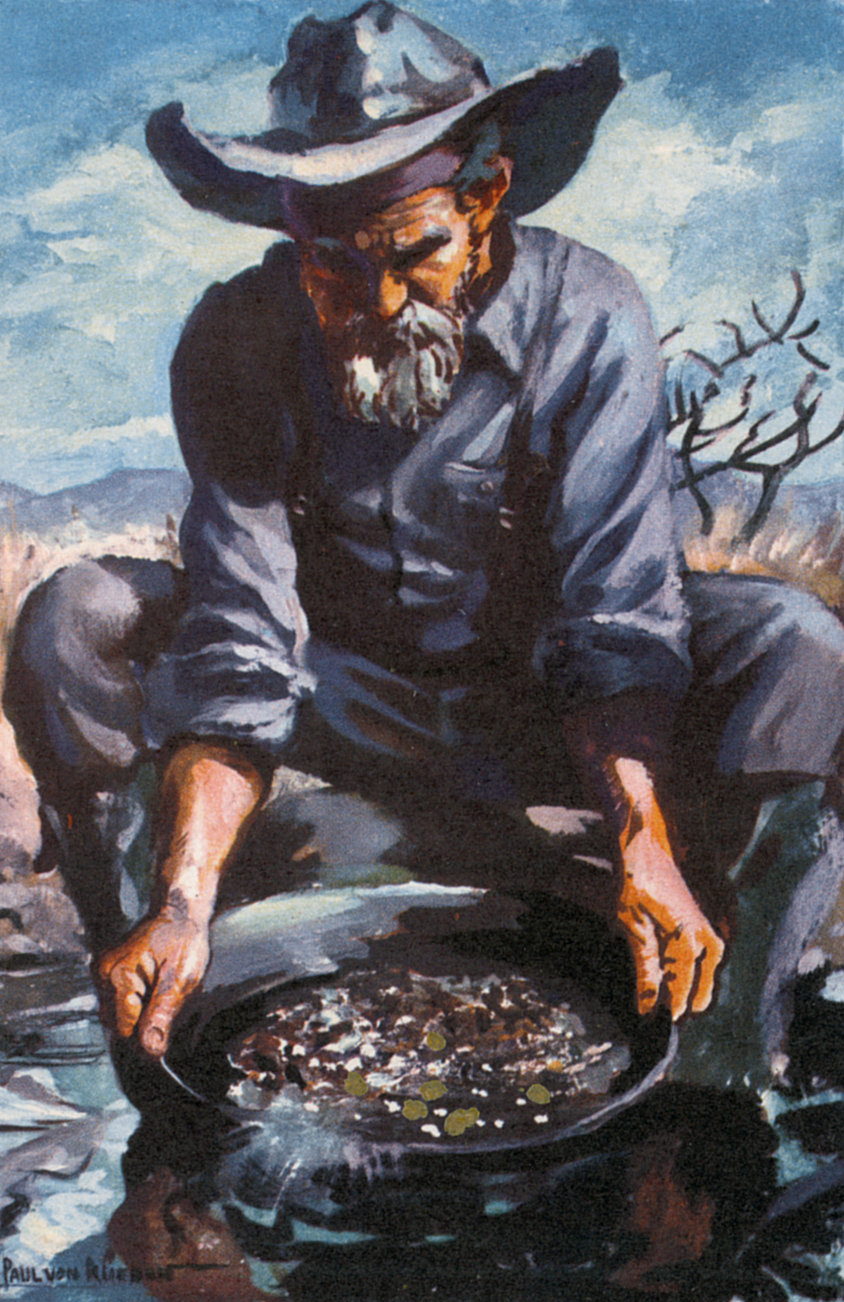
Painting of a prospector, 1948, by von Klieben. Courtesy of the Orange County Archives.

Mining in Calico faded, and again it became a ghost town. After building Ghost Town at Knott’s Berry Farm in the 1940s, Walter Knott, his son, Russell, and Paul von Klieben made a road trip to Calico. The three of them came back filled with enthusiasm. If they could build an imaginary ghost town at Knott’s Berry Farm, would it not be possible to restore a real ghost town? In 1951, Walter Knott bought the town of Calico, and put Paul von Klieben in charge of the whole restoration project.

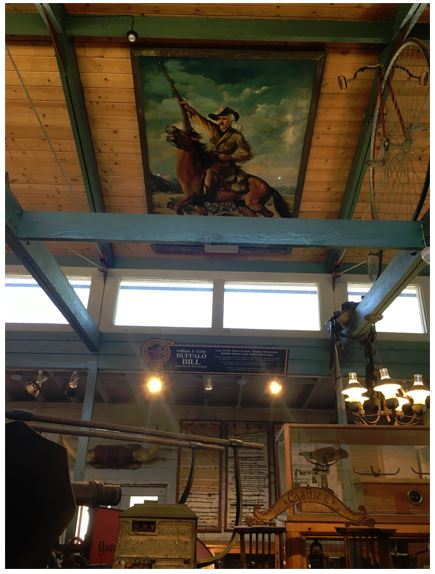
The Western Trails Museum at Knott’s Berry Farm houses two of von Klieben’s large portraits, including this one of Buffalo Bill.

Using Walter’s memory and that of some old-timers who still lived in the area, von Klieben was able to not only restore existing structures, but also design and replace missing buildings. Knott spent $700,000 restoring Calico.

== Body of work ==
Von Klieben’s body of work includes a number of portraits of actors and people of notable families that are in private collections that he painted before his association with Walter Knott. A number of his paintings that were done for Knott’s Berry Farm were sold to private collectors when the farm held an auction in 2017. However, several of his notable works are still at Knott’s Berry Farm. His huge painting “Saturday Night in Old Calico, 1888,” which originally hung behind the bar in the Calico Saloon, now hangs in the Pitchur Gallery. He painted two very large paintings of berry fields and a portrait of Rachel Elizabeth “Toni” Knott, all of which hang in Virginia’s Gift Shop. He also painted a mural that is in the Ghost Town Grill, and two large portraits that are in the Western Trails Museum. Perhaps his greatest large painting is a landscape of Ghost Town, which hangs in the Chicken Dinner Restaurant.

== Retirement ==
In March 1953, von Klieben reluctantly retired to Sonora, California in the Sierra Nevada foothills. He intended to devote more time to his first love, executing paintings and dioramas of early California, as well as still doing planning work for the farm and the restoration project at the town of Calico. He retained his adobe studio in Ghost Town for use when he visited Knott’s.

However, the retirement was to be short-lived. He died three months later, of a heart attack, on June 14, 1953. He left a brother, Fritz von Klieben, a niece and a cousin, who lived in Germany.

Walter Knott and Paul von Klieben had personalities that were quite different from one another. Knott was calm and reserved. Von Klieben was described as volatile and erratic. However, they both agreed that they were mutually stimulating. They worked closely together for 12 years, and the results they produced were resoundingly successful. Knott emphasized to Helen Kooiman (one of his biographers) that “I want the readers of this biography to know that I attribute much of the success of Ghost Town to this man.” Knott made the same point to numerous others. When von Klieben died, Knott was devastated by his friend’s unexpected death. At von Klieben’s funeral Walter Knott wept openly.
