= Silver Valley Unified School District =

School district in California

Address
- 35320 Daggett-Yermo Road San Bernardino County Yermo, California, 92398; United States

District information
- Type: Public
- Grades: K through 12
- NCES District ID: 0636820

Students and staff
- Students: 2,014 (2020–2021)
- Teachers: 114.36 (FTE)
- Staff: 123.96 (FTE)
- Student–teacher ratio: 17.61:1

Other information
- Website: www.svusdk12.net

Silver Valley Unified School District is located in the High Desert of Southern California, between Los Angeles and Las Vegas. The district covers an area of approximately 3,345 square miles (8,660 km^{2}), equivalent in size to the combined states of Rhode Island and Delaware.

It provides educational services to the census-designated places of Fort Irwin and Yermo, and the communities of Calico, Daggett, and Ludlow.

The SVUSD Office is located at 35320 Daggett-Yermo Road in Daggett, California, 8 miles (13 km) north of Barstow.

The district currently has two high schools, Calico Continuation High School and Silver Valley High School.

== District Statistics ==
School Information

- Number of Schools: 7
- Number of Students: 2,596
- Number of Teachers: 144
- Number of Males: 1,214
- Number of Females: 1,213
- Area: 3,345.92 square miles (8,665.9 km^{2})

Race Distribution

- Asian: 5%
- Black: 20%
- Hispanic: 20%
- Native American: 1%
- White/Other: 53%

== Schools ==
- Alternative Education Center at 33525 Ponnay, Daggett, CA 92327, (760) 254-2715
- Fort Irwin Middle School at 1700 Pork Chop Hill St, Fort Irwin, CA 92310, (760) 386-1133
- Lewis (Congressman Jerry) Elementary School at 1800 Blackhawk St, Fort Irwin, CA 92310, (760) 386-1900
- Newberry Springs Elementary School at 33713 Newberry Rd, Newberry Springs, CA 92365, (760) 257-3211
- Silver Valley High School at 35484 Daggett/Yermo Rd, Daggett, CA 92327, (760) 254-2963
- Tiefort View Intermediate School at 8700 Anzio, Fort Irwin, CA 92310, (760) 386-3123
- Yermo Elementary School at 38280 Gleason St, Yermo, CA 92398, (760) 254-2931
