= Rainbow Basin =

Geological formation in the Calico Peaks range, California

Rainbow Basin Natural Area
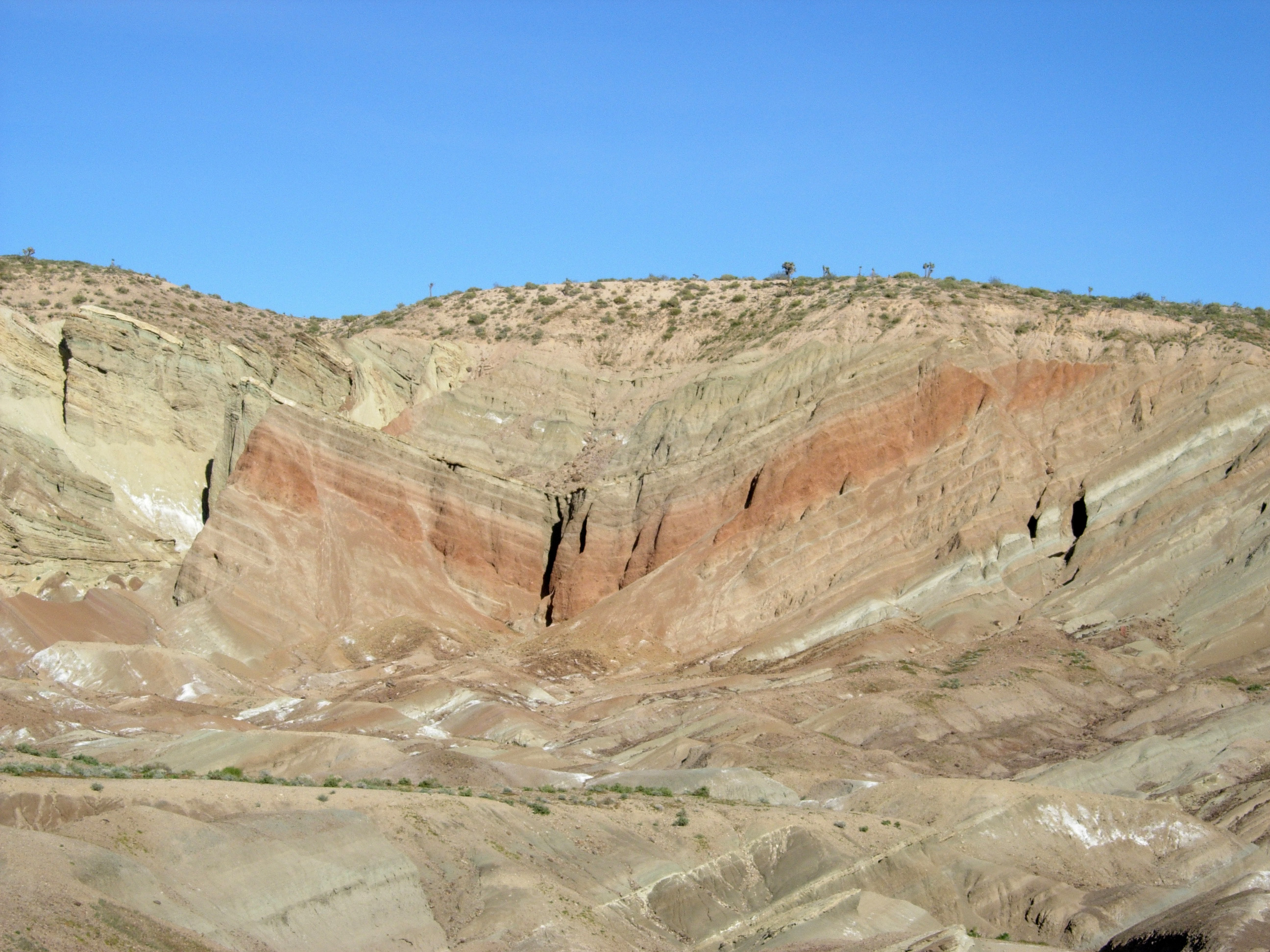
- The famous Rainbow Basin syncline

- Location within California Location within the United States
- Location: San Bernardino County, California
- Nearest city: Barstow
- Coordinates: 35°01′46″N 117°02′12″W
- Area: 1,961 acres (794 ha)

U.S. National Natural Landmark
- Designated: 1966

Rainbow Basin is a geological formation in the Calico Peaks range, located approximately 8 miles (13 km) north of Barstow in the Mojave Desert in San Bernardino County, California.

The Rainbow Basin has been designated a National Natural Landmark and is in the Bureau of Land Management managed Rainbow Basin Natural Area. Rainbow Basin is a mixture of private and public land, but it is managed by the Bureau of Land Management. It is accessible to the public via Irwin Road from Barstow to an unpaved loop road through the basin.

The basin is notable for its rock formations as well as its fossil beds, which have provided scientists with valuable information about life during the middle Miocene epoch, between 12 and 16 million years ago; and to the northeast the Calico Early Man Site.

== Geology ==
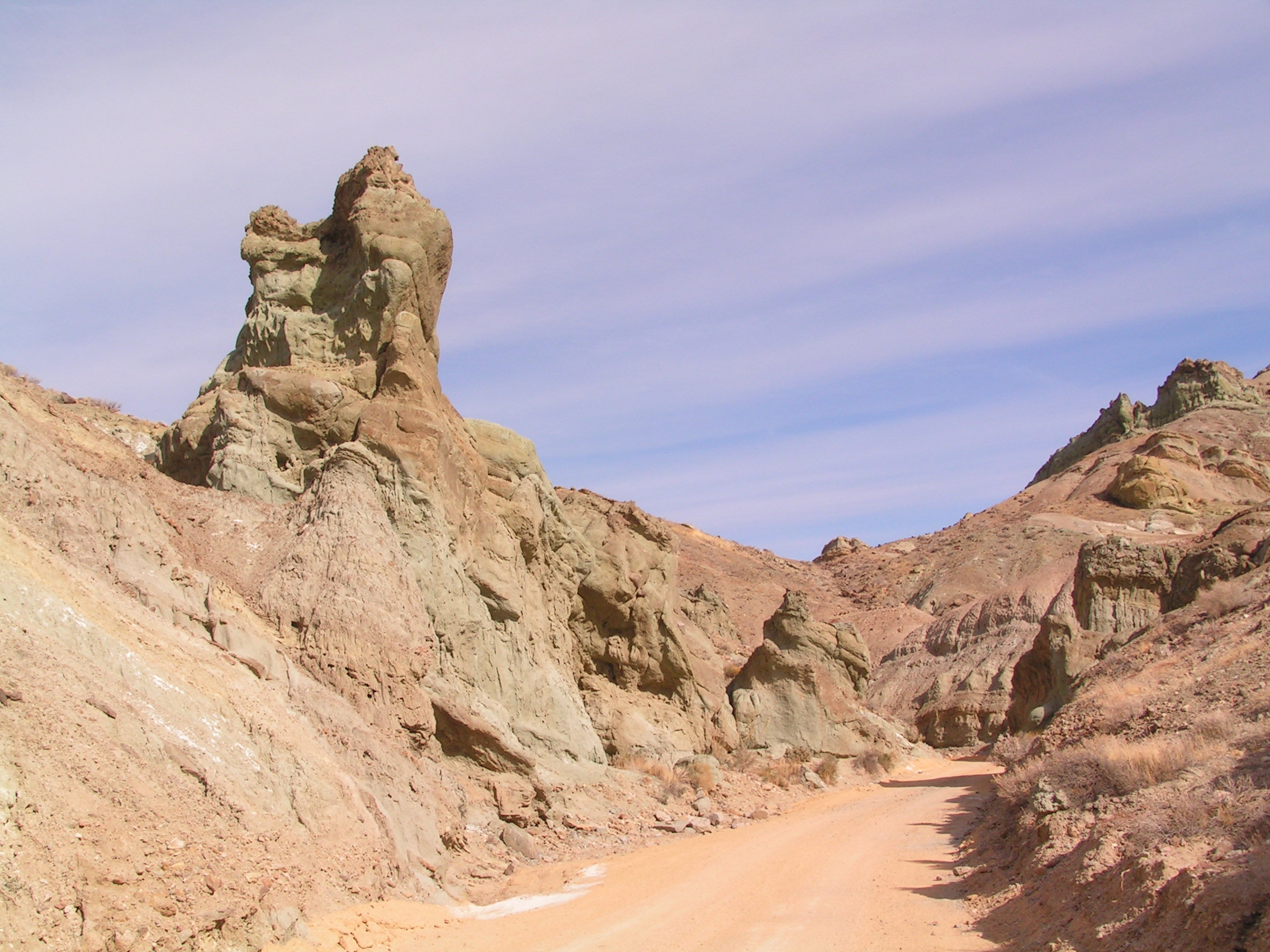
Some of the eroded "Badlands" topography of Rainbow Basin.

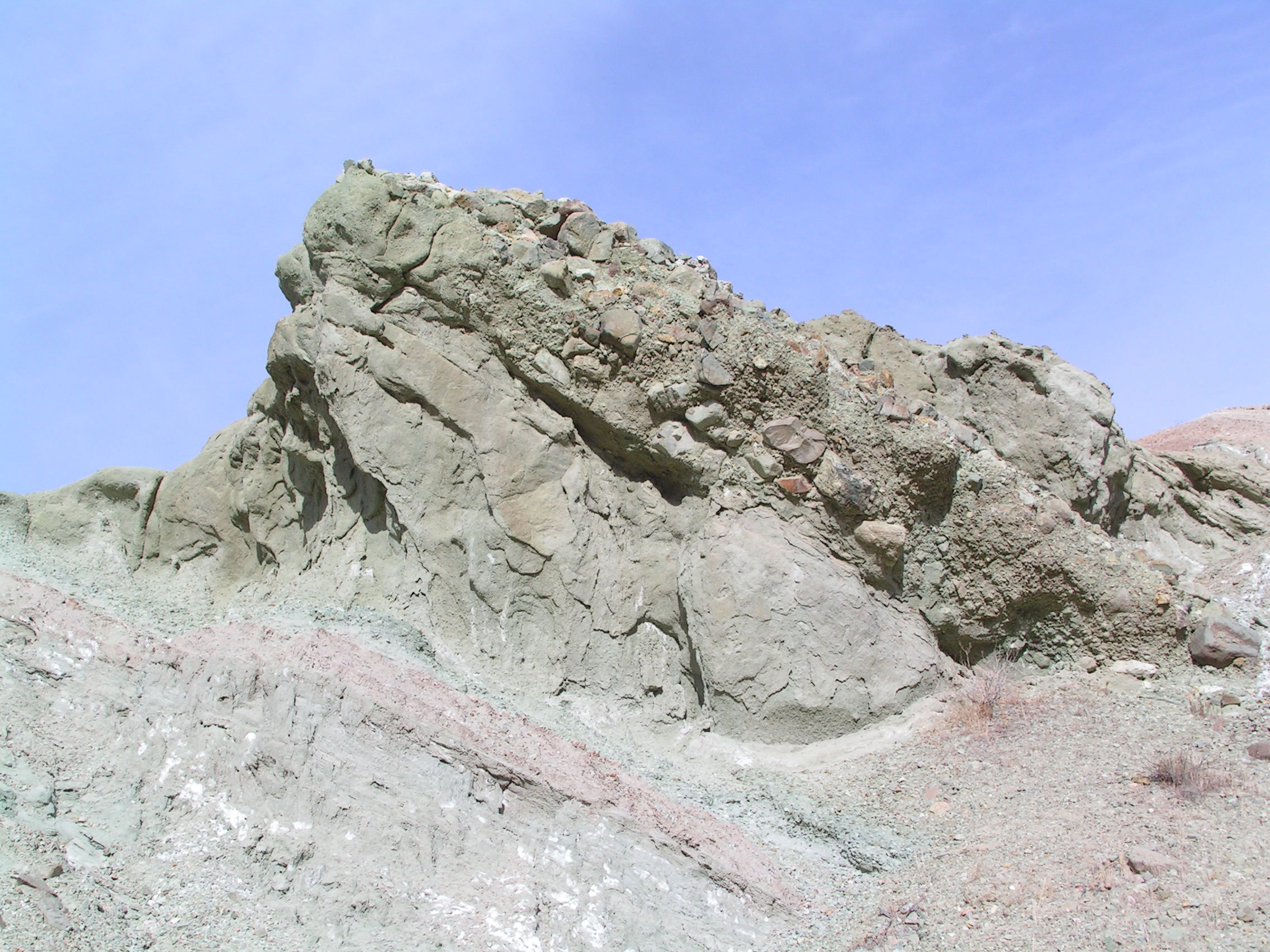
One of the conglomerates making up the Barstow Formation.

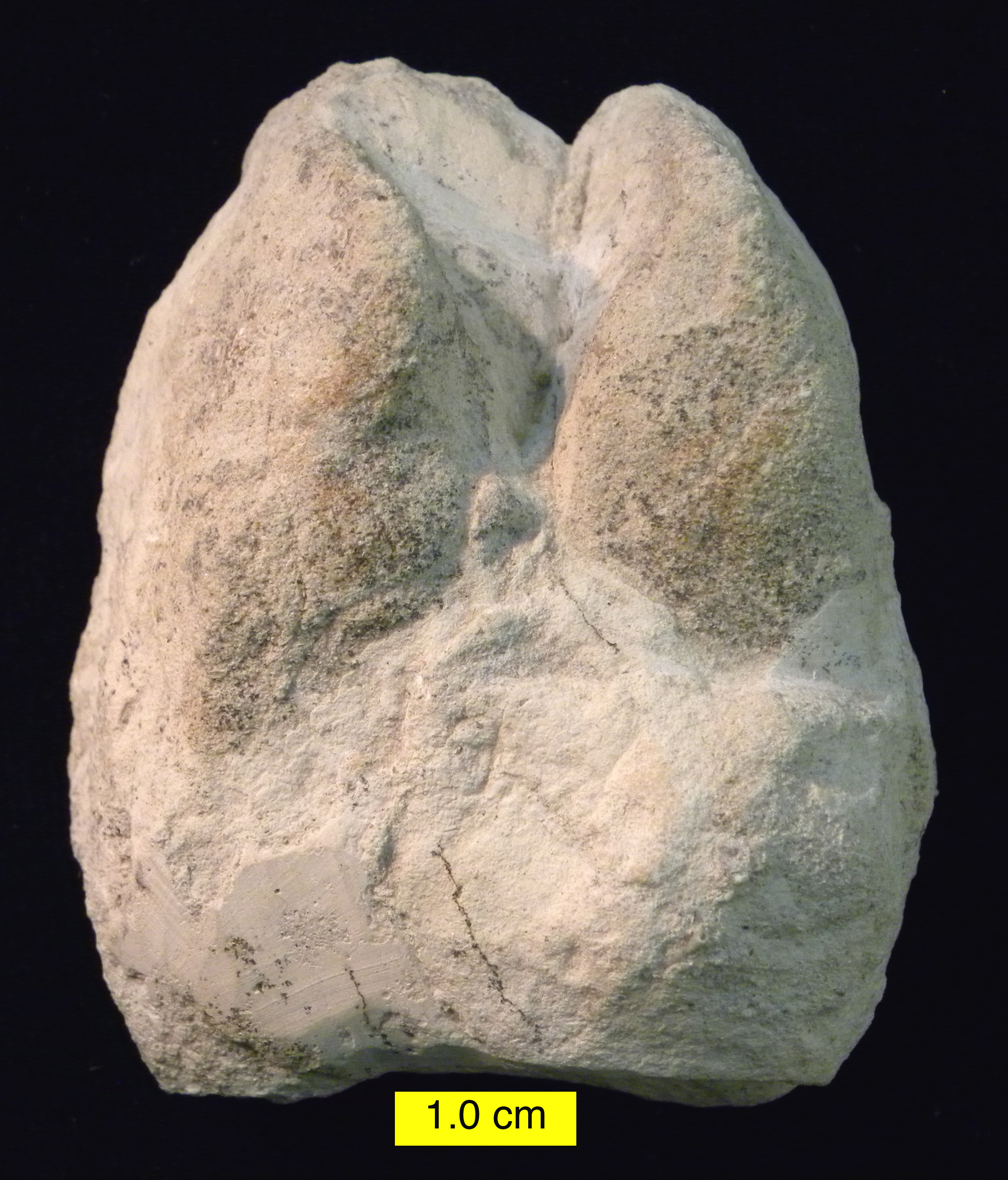
Cameloid footprint (Lamaichnum alfi Sarjeant and Reynolds, 1999; convex hyporelief) from the Barstow Formation (Miocene) of Rainbow Basin, California.

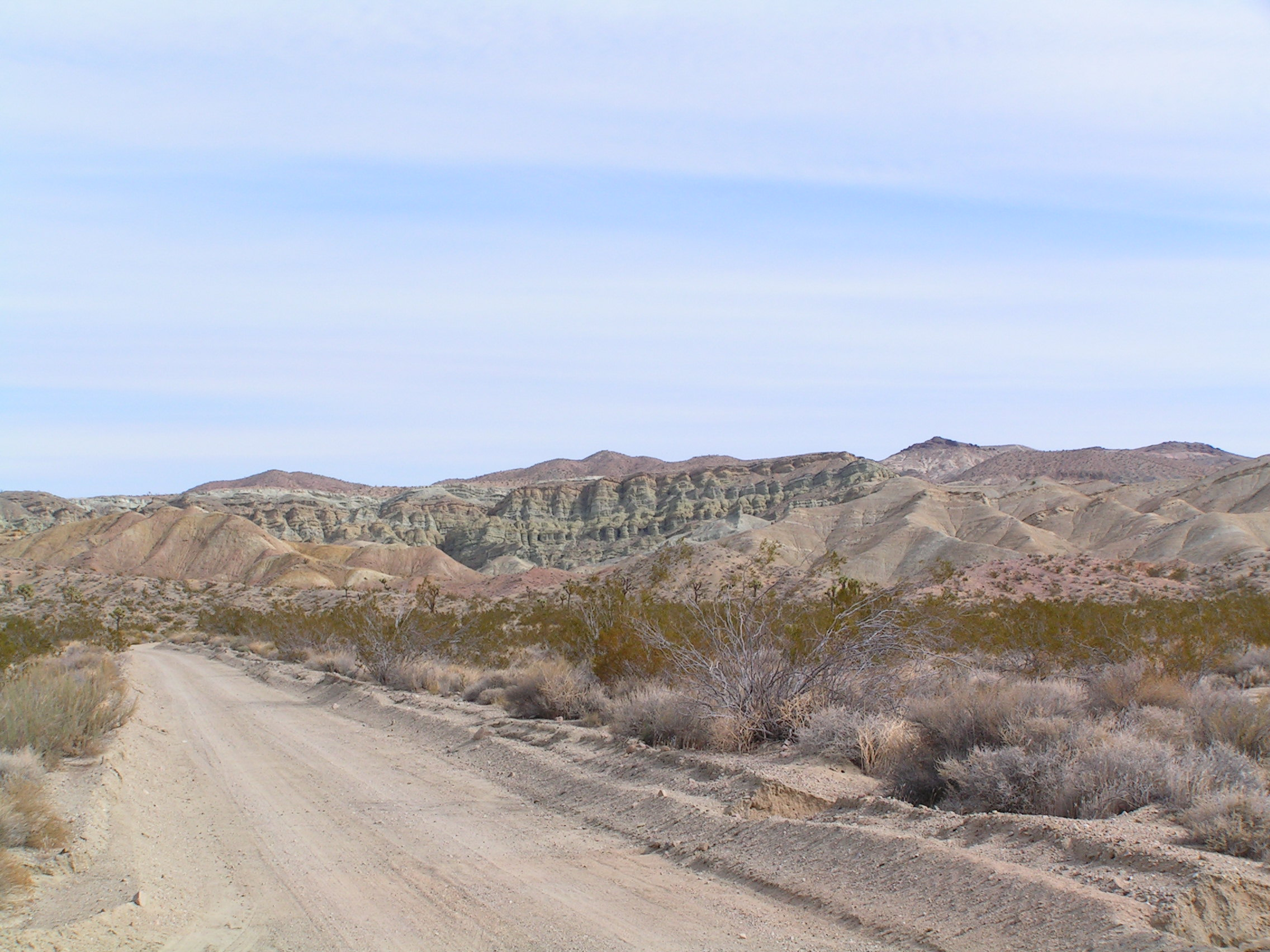
Leaving Rainbow Basin. The white layer along the skyline is marker tuff.

Underneath Rainbow Basin is the massive batholith that lies below much of the western Mojave (Dibblee 1968:15). Made from a type of rock called quartz monzonite, this batholith dates to either the Cretaceous, or possibly the late Jurassic period (Dibblee 1967:43). Early in the Cenozoic Era this batholith was exposed in the area surrounding Rainbow Basin and bent downward as it underwent compression, to form a basin (Bureau of Land Management 1992:30). Sediments deposited in this basin became the sedimentary rocks that are most visible in Rainbow Basin today (Dibblee 1968:56-57). Further compression, uplift, and finally extension left these sedimentary formations deeply folded, the most prominent fold being the Barstow Syncline. These same stresses also produced several faults in the Rainbow Basin area (Bureau of Land Management 1992:30).

The thick sedimentary layers can be divided into three distinct formations. The lowest is called the Jackhammer Formation, and it is composed of layers of sandstone, siltstone, limestone, and conglomerate, all probably dating to the early Miocene Epoch (Dibblee 1968:18).

Above this is the Pickhandle Formation. The sediments making up this formation are mostly of volcanic origin – tuff, rhyolite and andesite (Dibblee 1967:84), indicating that they were laid down during a period of active volcanism. That time was probably during the early Miocene (Dibblee 1968:23).

The highest of the three formations is the Barstow Formation, which is made up of layers of conglomerate, limestone, sandstone, and shale (Dibblee 1967:86). This formation dates to the middle to late Miocene (Lindsay 1972:15) and it contains one of the largest Cenozoic fossil assemblages in North America (Dibblee 1968:32). Most of the sediment that makes up the layers in this formation was stream-laid (Dibblee 1968:28), but there is a white layer of rhyolitic tuff (sometimes called marker tuff) near the top (Dibblee 1967:86).

Finally, on top of everything else, is a relatively thin layer of fanglomerate (alluvial fan deposits) laid down during the late Pleistocene (Bureau of Land Management 1992:31). Differential erosion of rocks of different hardness finished the job of sculpting the formations into the fantastic shapes that can be seen in Rainbow Basin today (Dibblee 1968:52).

== Fossil beds ==
The majority of the fossil beds in Rainbow Basin are found within the sedimentary rocks of the Barstow Formation. They include many animals not found in California today, including camels, horses, mastodons, and flamingos (Lindsay 1972:15), (Bureau of Land Management 1992:33). This unique collection of animals is representative of the Barstovian Land Mammal age. In 1941 Rainbow Basin was designated the type reference for the Barstovian Land Mammal age by the North American Paleontological Society (Bureau of Land Management 1992:33).

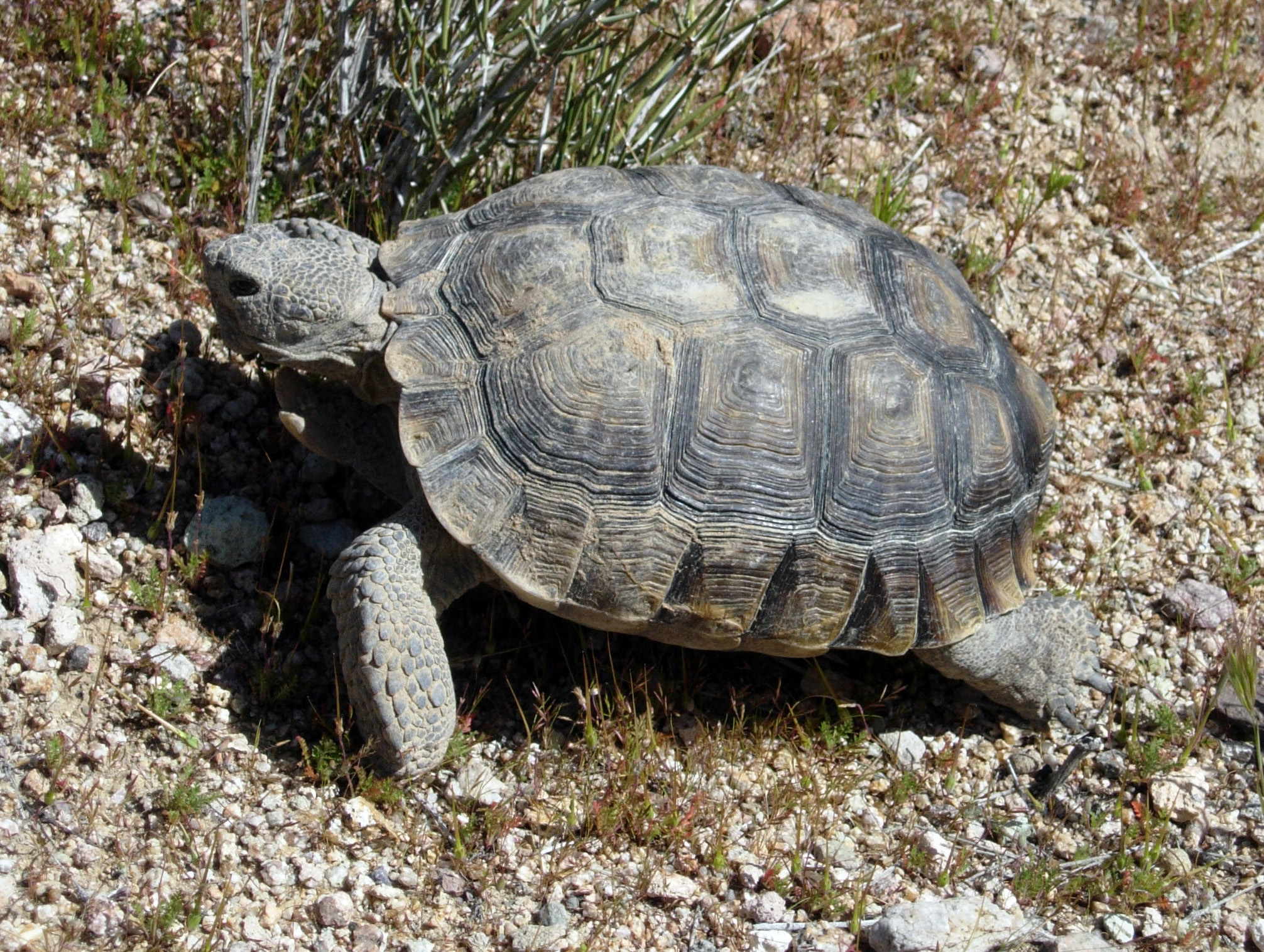
Desert tortoise in Rainbow Basin.

== Access ==
Rainbow Basin is open to the public by means of a one-way dirt road that loops through the basin. There is no camping within Rainbow Basin itself, but the Owl Canyon Campground is nearby. Fossils cannot be collected without a permit. Anyone planning a trip to this natural landmark should keep in mind that it is a desert area, and take appropriate safety precautions.
