= Yermo, California =

Unincorporated town in California, United States

Yermo
- Unincorporated town Census-designated place
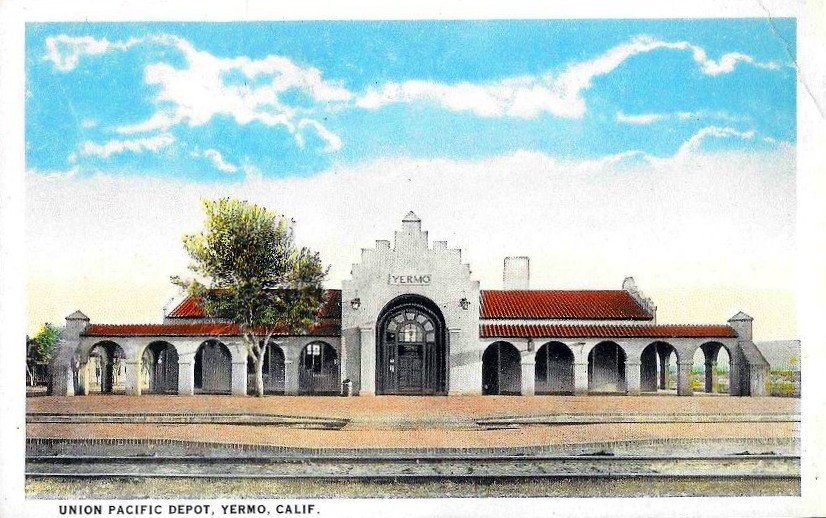
- The former Union Pacific depot in the 1920s

- Location within the state of California Yermo (the United States)
- Coordinates: 34°54′24″N 116°49′24″W
- Country: United States
- State: California
- County: San Bernardino

Area
  - Total: 0.654 sq mi (1.69 km^{2})
  - Land: 0.649 sq mi (1.68 km^{2})
  - Water: 0.005 sq mi (0.013 km^{2})
- Elevation: 1,929 ft (588 m)

Population (2020)
  - Total: 623
  - Density: 960/sq mi (371/km^{2})
- Time zone: UTC-8 (Pacific (PST))
  - Summer (DST): UTC-7 (PDT)
- ZIP codes: 92398
- Area codes: 442/760
- FIPS code: 06-86720
- GNIS feature ID: 2805257

Yermo (Spanish for "wilderness" or "wasteland") is an unincorporated town and census-designated place (CDP) in the Mojave Desert in San Bernardino County, California. It is 13 miles (21 km) east of Barstow on Interstate 15, just south of the Calico Mountains.

As of the 2020 census, Yermo had a population of 623.

Founded in 1902 and originally named Otis, Yermo is situated at a division point of the Los Angeles and Salt Lake Railroad, later the Union Pacific Railroad line. A post office was established three years later with William J. Flavin serving as Yermo's first postmaster. It later developed around serving motorists traveling the Arrowhead Trail (later U.S. Route 91), which ran through the community.

Today, Yermo is governed by an elected five-member board of directors comprising the Community Services District authorized by the County of San Bernardino. The board, which meets monthly, oversees the community's volunteer fire department, the Yermo/Calico VFD, as well as its street lighting, parks and water system. Yermo's ZIP Code is 92398, and it is in telephone area codes 442 and 760. Its USPS branch provides post office boxes to local residents and businesses; there is no letter-carrier service.

Yermo hosts the 1,859-acre (7.5 km^{2}) storage and industrial annex of the Marine Corps Logistics Base Barstow.

== Economy ==
=== Businesses ===
When Interstate 15 opened in 1968, Yermo was immediately bypassed by traffic traveling to and from Las Vegas, Nevada. As a result, 90 percent of its local businesses closed.

During its heyday, Yermo had 27 gas stations with mechanics, seven bars, two grocery stores, a hardware store, a pizza shop, four real estate offices, three motels, a thrift store, several restaurants, roadside camping sites and two parks. In 2009, it had one grocery/general store, one bar, one thrift store, three restaurants, four gas stations, one park, and one motel 3 miles (4.8 km) to the south.

The fast-food restaurant chain Del Taco was founded in Yermo in 1964.

Yermo once had a California agriculture inspection station for traffic heading south on Interstate 15. It relocated in 2018 to just north of Mountain Pass, between Yates Well Road and Nipton Road.

=== Tourism ===
In the mid-20th century, the Yermo Chamber of Commerce styled the community as the "Gateway to the Calicos", referring to its location about 3 miles (4.8 km) south of the Calico Mountains and the historic Calico Ghost Town. At the time, Yermo and Barstow were campaigning to establish a state park at Calico, which was an active silver mining town from the early 1880s until the turn of the 20th century. In 1952, former Calico resident and Knotts Berry Farm founder Walter Knott, whose uncle John King was once the town’s sheriff, and who worked at there as a carpenter in 1915, purchased Calico and restored it. He later deeded it to the San Bernardino County, which operates the site as a historical county park and a popular tourist attraction of the U.S. Southwest.

== Government ==
Parks, water, and Firefighting services are provided by Yermo Community Services District

== Other establishments ==
=== Schools ===
The Silver Valley Unified School District (SVUSD) is the school district covering the Yermo CDP, and in the Yermo area. It operates K-12 schools in the communities of Yermo, Daggett and Newberry Springs, and at the U.S. Army National Training Center at Ft. Irwin.

=== Churches ===
In 2009 Yermo had three active churches, one Baptist and two non-denominational/fundamentalist.

== Climate ==
According to the Köppen Climate Classification system, Yermo has a semi-arid climate, abbreviated "BSk" on climate maps with long, very hot summers, sunny winters with cool nights and dry conditions year round.

== Demographics ==
Historical population
Census	Pop.	Note	%±
2020	623		—
U.S. Decennial Census; 1850–1870 1880-1890; 1900 1910 1920; 1930 1940 1950; 1960 1970 1980; 1990 2000 2010

Yermo first appeared as a census designated place in the 2020 U.S. census.

=== 2020 Census ===
Yermo CDP, California – Racial and ethnic composition Note: the US Census treats Hispanic/Latino as an ethnic category. This table excludes Latinos from the racial categories and assigns them to a separate category. Hispanics/Latinos may be of any race.
Race / Ethnicity (NH = Non-Hispanic)	Pop 2020	% 2020
White alone (NH)	366	58.75%
Black or African American alone (NH)	20	3.21%
Native American or Alaska Native alone (NH)	6	0.96%
Asian alone (NH)	10	1.61%
Pacific Islander alone (NH)	0	0.00%
Other race alone (NH)	0	0.00%
Mixed race or Multiracial (NH)	38	6.10%
Hispanic or Latino (any race)	183	39.37%
Total	623	100.00%
