= Calico, California =

Calico
- Ghost town; former mining town
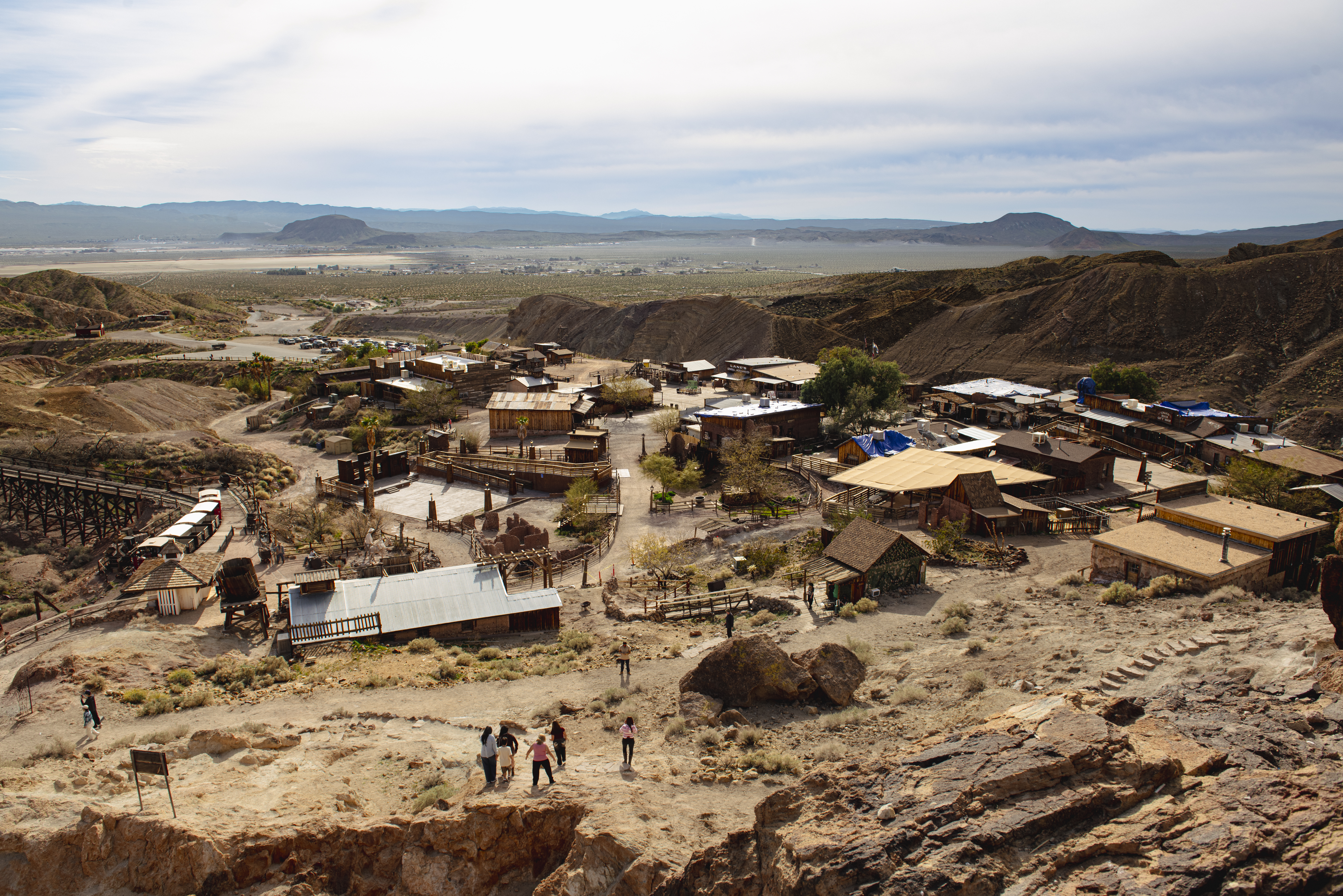
- View from the lookout point in Calico, California

- Location within Southern California
- Coordinates: 34°56′56″N 116°51′51″W
- Country: United States
- State: California
- County: San Bernardino
- Elevation: 2,283 ft (696 m)
- Time zone: UTC−8 (Pacific)
  - Summer (DST): UTC−7 (PDT)
- ZIP code: 92398
- Area codes: 760/442
- GNIS feature ID: 1660414
- Website: parks.sbcounty.gov/category/calico

California Historical Landmark
- Reference no.: 782

Calico is a ghost town and former mining town in San Bernardino County, California, United States. Located in the Calico Mountains of the Mojave Desert region of Southern California, it was founded in 1881 as a silver mining town, and was later converted into a county park named Calico Ghost Town. Located off Interstate 15, it lies 3 miles (4.8 km) equidistant from Barstow and Yermo. Giant letters spelling CALICO are visible, from the highway, on the Calico Peaks behind it. Walter Knott purchased Calico in the 1950s, and rebuilt all but the five remaining original buildings to look as they did in the 1880s. Calico received California Historical Landmark #782, and in 2005 was proclaimed by then-governor Arnold Schwarzenegger to be California's Silver Rush Ghost Town.

== History ==
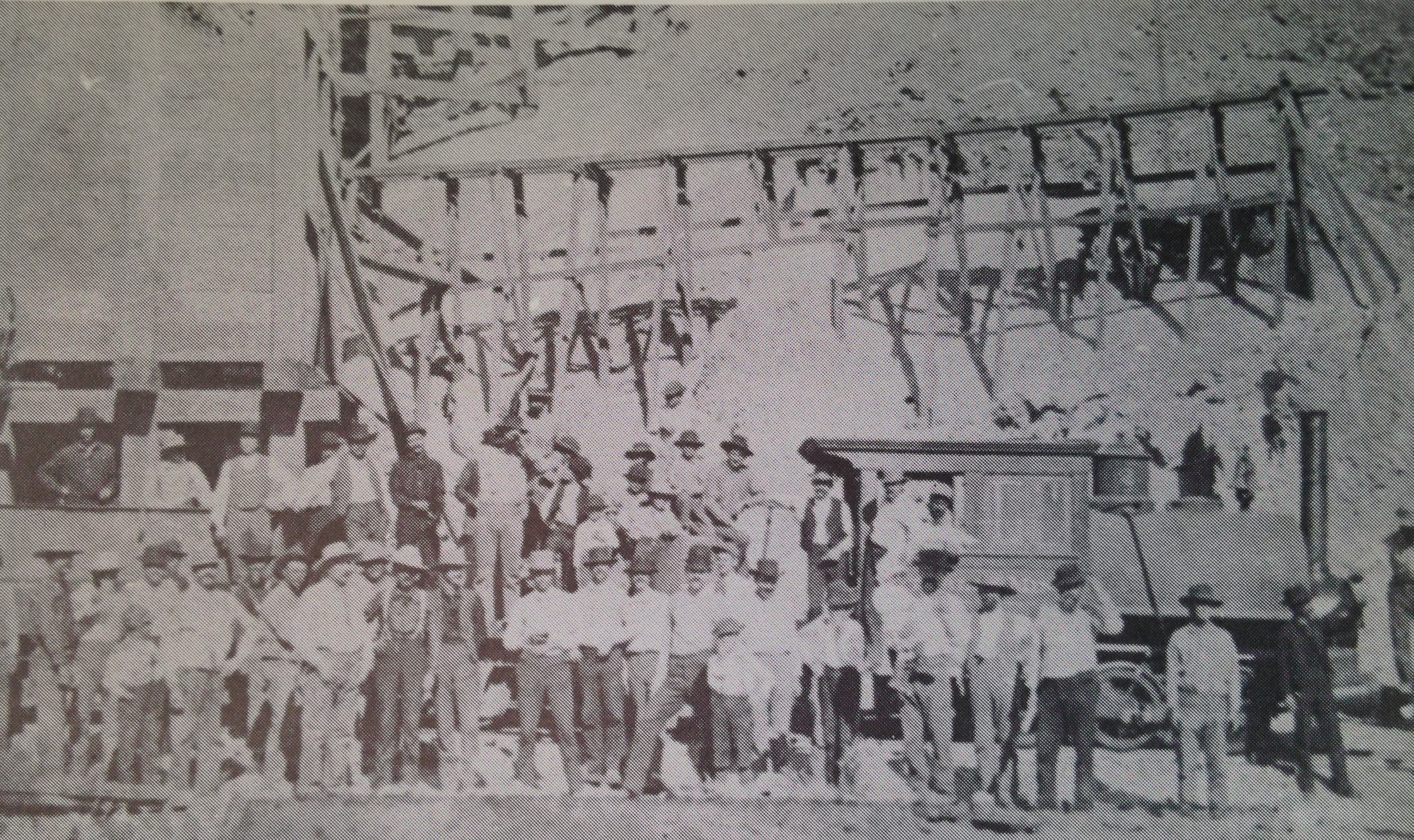
Original mining crew at the Silver King Mine

In 1881, four prospectors were leaving Grapevine Station (present-day Barstow, California) for a mountain peak to the northeast. After they described the peak as "calico-colored", the peak, the mountain range to which it belonged, and the town that followed were all called Calico. The four prospectors discovered silver in the mountain and opened the Silver King Mine, which was California's largest silver producer in the mid-1880s. John C. King, who had grubstaked the prospectors who discovered the silver vein (the Silver King Mine was thus named after him), was the uncle of Walter Knott founder of Knott's Berry Farm. King was sheriff of San Bernardino County from 1879 to 1882. A post office at Calico was established in early 1882, and the Calico Print, a weekly newspaper, started publishing. The town soon supported three hotels, five general stores, a meat market, bars, brothels, and three restaurants and boarding houses. The county established a school district and a voting precinct. The town also had a deputy sheriff and two constables, two lawyers and a justice of the peace, five commissioners, and two doctors. There was also a Wells Fargo office and a telephone and telegraph service. At the height of its silver production during 1883 and 1885, Calico had over 500 mines and a population of 1,200 people. Local badmen were buried in the Boot Hill cemetery.

The discovery of the borate mineral colemanite in the Calico mountains a few years after the settlement of the town also helped Calico's fortunes, and in 1890 the estimated population of the town was 3,500, with nationals of China, England, Ireland, Greece, France, and the Netherlands, as well as Americans living there. In the same year, the Silver Purchase Act was enacted and drove down the price of silver. By 1896, its value had decreased to $0.57 (~$22.00 in 2025) per troy ounce, and Calico's silver mines were no longer economically viable. The post office was discontinued in 1898, and the school closed not long after. By the turn of the twentieth century, Calico was all but a ghost town, and with the end of borax mining in the region in 1907 the town was largely abandoned. Many of the original buildings were moved to Barstow, Daggett and Yermo.

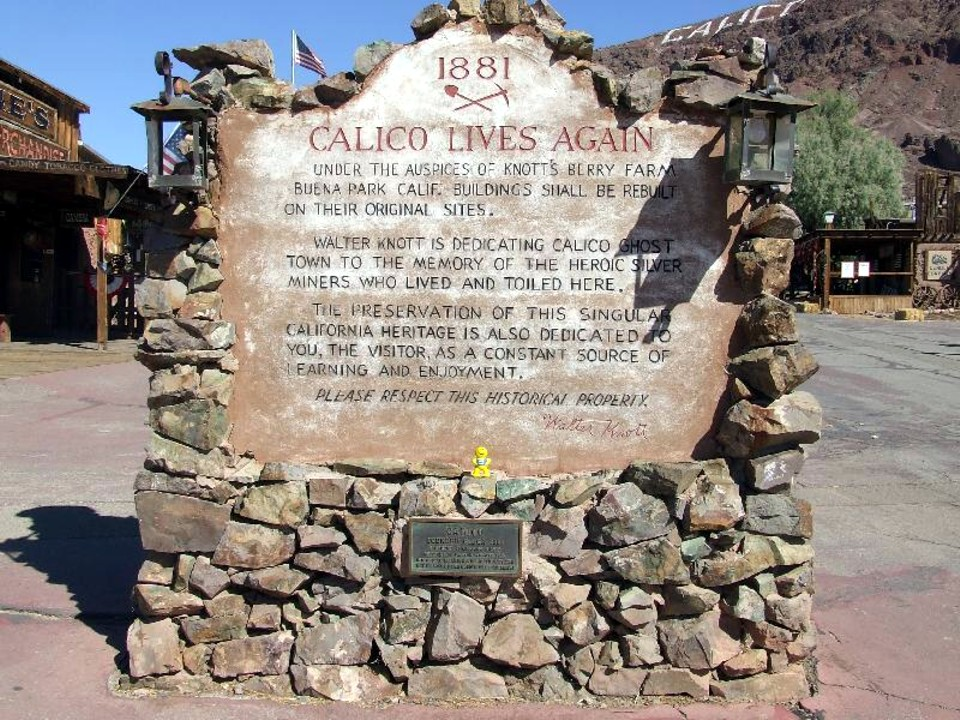
Restoring Calico was one of Walter Knott's efforts to educate the public and honor the pioneers.

An attempt to revive the town was made c. 1915, when a cyanide plant was built to recover silver from the unprocessed Silver King Mine's deposits. Walter Knott and his wife Cordelia, founders of Knott's Berry Farm, were homesteaded at Newberry Springs around this time, and Knott helped build the redwood cyanide tanks for the plant.

The last owner of Calico as a mine was Zenda Mining Company. After building Ghost Town at Knott's Berry Farm in the 1940s, Walter Knott, his son, Russell, and Paul von Klieben, who was Knott's art director, made a road trip to Calico. The three of them came back filled with enthusiasm. Now having experience building a fictional ghost town at Knott's Berry Farm, the group believed that it would be possible to restore a real ghost town. In 1951, Walter Knott purchased the town of Calico from the Zenda Mining Company and put Paul von Klieben in charge of restoring it to its original condition, referencing old photographs.

Using the old photos, and Walter's memory and that of some old-timers who still lived in the area, von Klieben was able to not only restore existing structures, but also design and replace missing buildings. Knott spent $700,000 restoring Calico. Knott installed a longtime employee named Freddy "Calico Fred" Noller as resident caretaker and official greeter. In 1966 Walter Knott decided to donate the town to San Bernardino County, and Calico became a County Regional Park.

== Current status ==
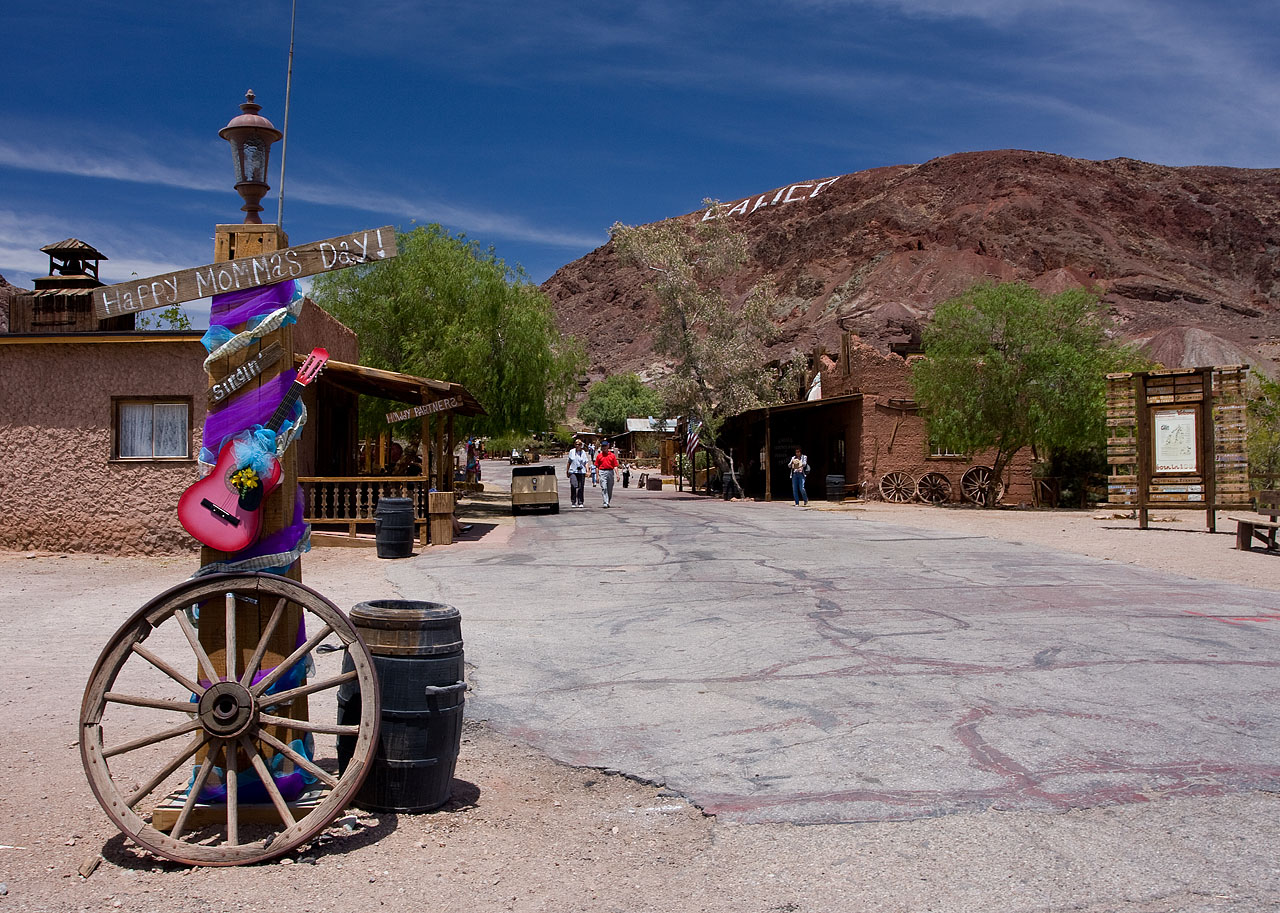
Entrance to the town with "CALICO" giant letters visible in the background

Calico has been restored to the look of the silver rush era when it flourished, although many original buildings were removed and replaced instead with gingerbread architecture and false façades that tourists would expect to see in a Western-themed town. Most of the restored and newly built buildings are made of wood with a simple, rustic architecture and a severely weathered appearance. Some structures still stand dating back to the town's operational years: Lil's Saloon; the town office; the former home of Lucy Lane, which is now the main museum but was originally the town's post office and courthouse; Smitty's Gallery; the general store; and Joe's Saloon. There is also a replica of the schoolhouse on the site of the original building. The one-time homes of the town's Chinese citizens exist as ruins only; only a portion of one rock wall remains of the former "family" residential area on a nearby bluff.

In November 1962, Calico Ghost Town was registered as a California Historical Landmark (Landmark #782), In 2002, Calico vied with Bodie in Mono County to be recognized as the Official State Ghost Town. In 2005, a compromise was finally reached when the State Senate and State Assembly agreed to list Bodie as the Official State Gold Rush Ghost Town and Calico as the Official State Silver Rush Ghost Town.

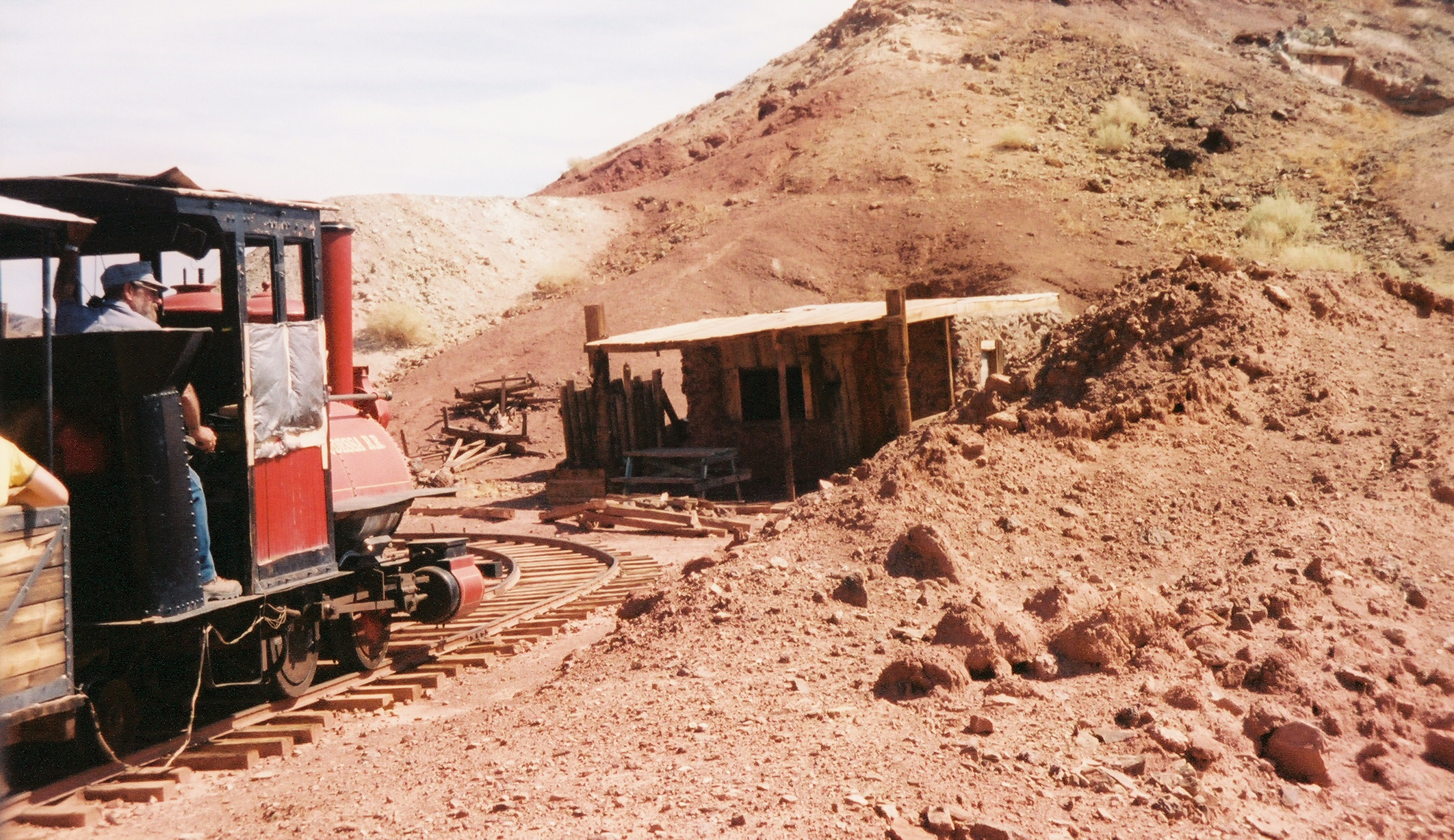
Calico & Odessa Railroad

Today, the park operates mine tours, gunfight stunt shows, gold panning, several restaurants, the historic 2 ft 6 in (762 mm) narrow-gauge Calico & Odessa Railroad, a Mystery Shack, and a number of trinket stores. It is open every day except Christmas and requires an entrance fee. Additional fees are required for some attractions. Overnight camping is also available. Special events are held throughout the year, including the Civil War Days Historical Reenactment on President's Day weekend, Spring Festival in May, Calico Days in early October, and a Ghost Town haunt in late October.

The Calico Cemetery, which holds between 96 and 130 graves, has had burials in the 20th and 21st centuries.

== In popular culture ==
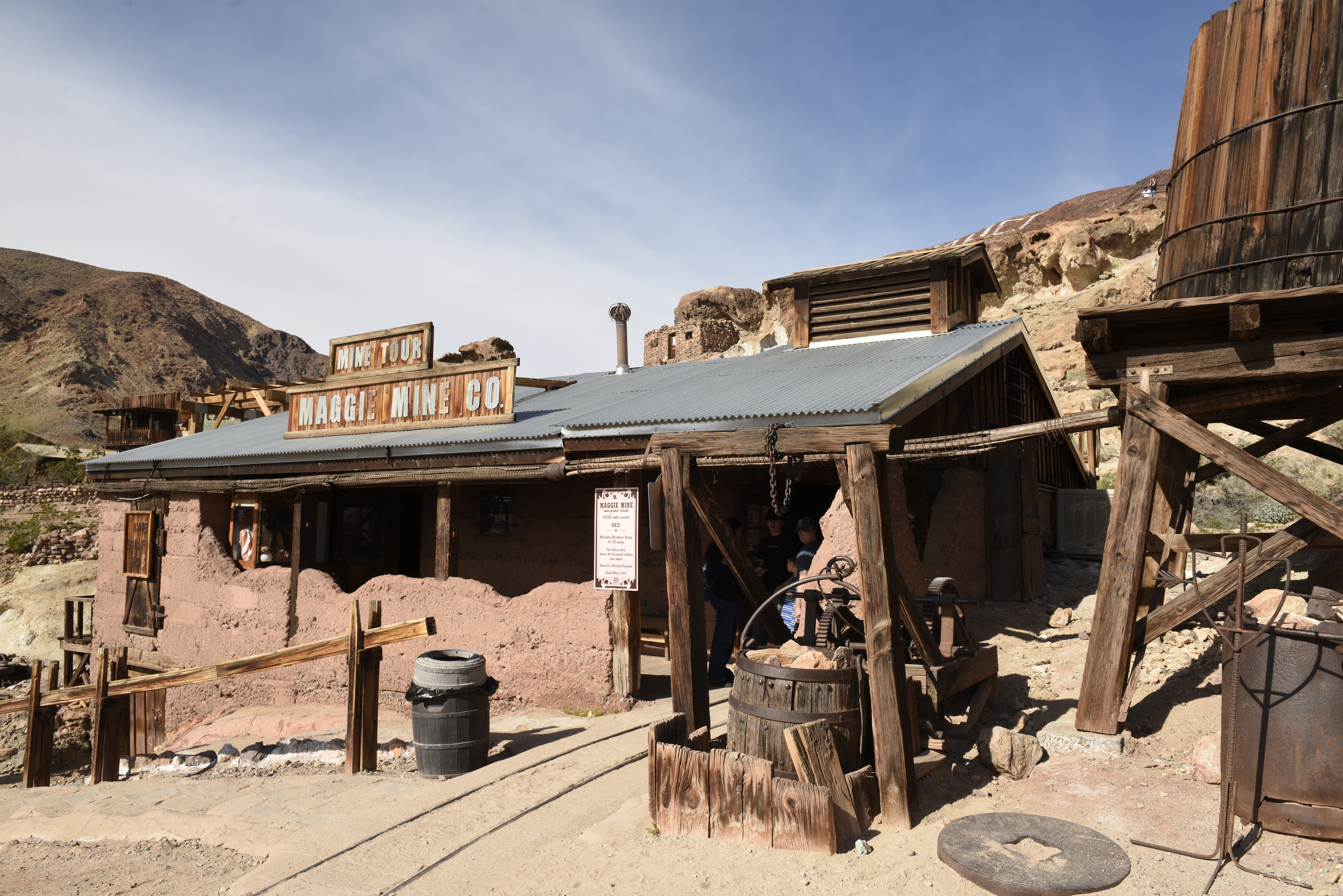
The Maggie Silver Mine is the last remaining mine in Calico that is open to the public for tours

- "Calico" by Lee Goldberg is a 2023 police procedural and time travel novel. The story is set in both the 1880s and modern day town.
- In the 1951 noir The Prowler, Calico is featured as an isolated post-goldrush dust bowl town the protagonists retreat to for privacy.
- Calico is the setting for the 1965 episode "The Book" of the syndicated television series, Death Valley Days.
- The Ballad of Calico is the eighth studio album by Kenny Rogers and the First Edition and was issued in February 1972. The entire double album is a country-rock concept album about Calico, California, and was written by Michael Murphey and Larry Cansler; the songs tell the stories of individuals who lived in the town. The album reached No. 118 on Billboard, and produced one single, "School Teacher", which reached No. 91.
- In Brent Maddock's western horror movie Tremors 3: Back to Perfection Calico was used as the set for Carson City, Nevada.
- Tamara Thorne's 2004 horror novel Thunder Road was inspired by Calico.
- Calico is mentioned in Joanna Newsom's 2004 song "Swansea", along with other Californian "ghost towns".
- Jennifer Lynn's 2005 romance novel New Prints In Old Calico was set in Calico.
- Gorillaz shot the music video for "Stylo" in Calico.
- Korean pop co-ed group KARD shot the "hidden" version of their music video in Calico for their debut song "Hola Hola".
- It was the inspiration of the Call of Duty: Black Ops II Zombies map "Buried"
- A house in Calico was shown in the music video for Robert Plant's "Big Log".

== See also ==
- Calico Early Man Site
- California Historical Landmarks in San Bernardino County, California
- Ghost Town at Knott's Berry Farm
- Waterloo Mining Railroad
