= CA-127 =

CA-127 may refer to:

- California State Route 127, a highway in the US state of California
- Caproni Ca.127, an experimental aircraft
