= Skyline Casino =

Casino hotel in Nevada, United States

Skyline Hotel and Casino
- Interactive map of Skyline Hotel and Casino
- Location: Henderson, Nevada; 1741 North Boulder Highway; 36.0625°N 115.0085°W
- Opened: October 1, 1964
- No. of rooms: 51
- Gaming space: 4,356 sq ft (404.7 m^{2})
- Casino type: Land-based
- Owner: Jim Marsh
- Previous names: Dixie Bar (1940s–64); Skyline Casino & Restaurant (1964–2017); Wheel Casino (1971–74)
- Renovated in: 1952; 1975; 1978–79; 1980; 1986–87; 1992; 2006; 2011; 2016–17
- Website: Official website

Skyline Hotel and Casino is a locals casino and hotel located on 0.89 acres (0.36 ha) of land at 1741 North Boulder Highway in Henderson, Nevada. The property initially opened as the Dixie Bar in the 1940s. The Skyline opened as a casino on the property on October 1, 1964, but closed the following year. It briefly operated as the Wheel Casino during the early 1970s, before reopening as the Skyline on October 1, 1974. It has been renovated numerous times since then, with a 51-room hotel structure opening in June 2017.

== History ==
=== Dixie Bar (1940s–1964) ===
The property began as the Dixie Bar, located in what was then-known as Pittman, Nevada. The bar was operational as early as 1948. At the time, the Dixie Cafe operated next to the bar. Barton W. Dukett and his wife, Dorothy Dukett, purchased the Dixie Bar and reopened it on the night of August 11, 1951. In April 1952, Dorothy Dukett committed suicide through a gunshot wound while conversing with her husband. The suicide occurred in the Duketts' home; a room at a motel that was a part of the Dixie Bar at the time. Rolly Cook and his wife, Ella Cook, purchased the Dixie Bar in May 1952, and planned to reopen it as a combination bar/liquor store at the end of the month. The Dixie Bar received a renovation over the next four months, and reopened on September 11, 1952. Sandwiches were the bar's feature attraction upon reopening.

The Cooks had no storage space for their many books and chose to store them on a book shelf in the bar. Customers at the bar were allowed to borrow the books. Many people who enjoyed the service began donating their own books. Cook's Books was established inside the Dixie Bar in October 1956. The bar soon became known as the only place in Pittman where people could purchase or borrow books. The Henderson Home News noted that "Pittman may well be the only town in the United States where the only library is located in one of the local taverns." By February 1957, the bar contained nearly 400 books. Customers suggested that a small fee be charged for the books, with the money being donated to charity. The fee was implemented and the money was ultimately used to purchase playground equipment for local children.

In August 1958, two masked men robbed the Dixie Bar around midnight, stealing more than $100 and tying up the Cooks in a back room. The Cooks operated the Dixie Bar until their retirement in 1960. That year, John Ligouri purchased the Dixie Bar.

=== Skyline (1964–present) ===
Ligouri and a few business partners, including Frank Kish and co-owner Joseph Antonio, built the 4,000 sq ft (370 m^{2}) Skyline Casino & Restaurant on the property. The Skyline opened with a three-day gala celebration starting at 6:00 a.m. on October 1, 1964. The Skyline's 24-hour restaurant served American, Chinese, and Italian food, with a seating capacity of 96 people. The Skyline's banquet room was capable of seating 50 people, while the casino featured one crap table, two poker tables, three blackjack tables, 30 slot machines, and two pinball machines. The Skyline's slogan was, "Your Pleasure is Our Business." Kish – whose family owned stock in the Skyline Corporation, an Indiana-based mobile home manufacturer – acted only as a landlord, without taking part in the business. Kish hired a gaming operator to run the casino. The Skyline closed in late July 1965. Officials said the closure was due to remodeling.

By March 1968, Walter Stogsdill had purchased the Skyline; the restaurant had been reopened by that time, while an imminent grand opening for the casino was being planned. In June 1968, Stogdsdill and three other men sought a gaming license to reopen the Skyline's casino portion. Stogsdill was the majority owner, with 50 percent ownership. The Skyline closed that year. In December 1970, a 16-year-old boy was arrested after breaking into the vacant building. In October 1971, a liquor license was approved for the building, which was to be renamed the Wheel Casino. A bar opened at the Wheel at the end of the month. The restaurant was expected to be operational in November 1971, while the casino was expected to open in early 1972. The casino was owned by Jim McKuin, Ron Chiodini, and Ted Polichnowsky. The Wheel Casino continued operations into 1972, and Ligouri later reopened it as the Skyline on October 1, 1974. The Skyline celebrated its one-year anniversary with a free-prize giveaway. The Skyline had been completely remodeled by that point, while Ligouri had future plans for a sports book and a 40-unit motel.

By April 1976, John Kish, the son of Frank Kish, was approved for fifty percent ownership of the Skyline. By April 1977, Kish took over full ownership and management of the Skyline, after Ligouri sold his share. At the time, the property consisted of a one-story 4,000 sq ft (370 m^{2}) building, with a bar and 15 slot machines. Kish said that at the time, "I really felt I would sell it soon." A $42,000 addition was made to the property beginning in 1978. Kish planned to expand the bar and restaurant, while also adding a new office and a video game arcade. The expansion was completed in 1979.

In September 1979, a couple was married inside the casino. The Henderson Home News wrote that it was "probably one of the few ceremonies performed between rows of slot machines." Kish purchased the adjacent Sky Motel later that year. In 1980, an alley behind the Skyline, serving as a parking lot, was approved for the construction of an additional building. In June 1982, the Skyline was evacuated after a bomb threat was made against the casino through two telephone calls, although a bomb was not located. In August 1982, a man was arrested after robbing an undetermined amount of money from the Skyline's casino cage.

By July 1986, the first phase of a three-phase expansion was underway with a 10-room addition to the Sky Motel, at an estimated cost of $150,000. Completion was expected within 90 days, with a September 1 opening targeted. Kish said the motel "was in the worst condition when I bought it. I've tried to improve it within financial reasoning, but now I can't stand the eyesore any longer." The second phase was to expand the casino and restaurant, while the final phase would remove old buildings from the property and add more parking. The entire expansion was expected to cost a total of more than $1 million. At the time, the casino included 150 slot machines. The addition was completed in 1987. The Skyline's original 1964 sign was replaced in October 1988; the original sign was revamped and installed at the Sky Motel. An addition was made in 1992. By 1996, the building had been expanded to 30,000 sq ft (2,800 m^{2}).

==== Sale and hotel addition ====
In June 2003, Kish sold the casino for $3.9 million to Jim Marsh, who owned a local automobile dealership and hotel-casino properties elsewhere in the state, including the Longstreet Hotel, Casino, and RV Resort in Amargosa Valley, Nevada. Kish sold the casino as it had become "a hassle" for him, considering his age and health.

In 2006, the casino's restaurant and two bars were remodeled at an estimated cost of $133,764. Marsh later conceived plans for an expansion, including a hotel, but such plans were ultimately cancelled immediately prior to the 2008 recession. As of 2008, the Skyline was one of a few Las Vegas casinos to still feature slot machines that accept and dispense coins. Marsh said, "These so-called dinosaur machines are the backbone of our casino. If we took those (older machines) out, we'd probably lose 50 percent of our business." In 2011, the bar, casino, restaurant, sports book and stage area received a renovation costing approximately $2 million. As of 2015, the casino is 4,356 sq ft (404.7 m^{2}).

In June 2014, there were plans to add a two-story, 35-room hotel on the rear property of the casino. The two structures would be connected by a walkway. The new hotel structure was also to be connected to the vacant single-story motel structure also on the property. In May 2016, groundbreaking took place for a three-story hotel wing with 51 rooms, including 18 suites. The hotel was expected to open in mid-February 2017, with an additional 20 to 25 people expected to be employed. As of October 2016, a second construction phase was being planned and would add another 51 rooms, with the potential for a third phase. The first phase of the hotel, built at a cost of $9 million, was opened in June 2017.

The hotel had an average 60-percent occupancy rate during June to November 2017, and the hotel also resulted in a 31-percent increase in beverage, food and gaming revenue in the adjacent casino. In December 2017, plans were announced for a hotel expansion which would add a new building with 41 rooms for a total of 92. The expansion would also include a hotel pool. Construction was scheduled to begin during the first quarter of 2018, with completion expected by late 2018. The expansion was expected to cost $7 million. At the time of the announced expansion, the Skyline had 300 slot machines, nearly 90 of which were coin-operated. In February 2018, the Nevada Gaming Control Board filed a three-count complaint against the Skyline's gaming operator, Northumberland LMG Corporation, for its failure to submit monthly hiring reports for the casino – as required by the board – dating to May 2016. Marsh, the president of Northumberland, admitted the failure and stated that it was due to a manager who fell behind on filing the reports as the result of personal problems. A stipulation agreement was signed in which Northumberland agreed to pay a $4,000 fine.
