= 002 =

002, 0O2, O02, OO2, or 002 may refer to:

== Airports ==
- 0O2, Baker Airport
- O02, Nervino Airport

== Astronomy ==
- 1996 OO2, the minor planet 7499 L'Aquila
- 1990 OO2, the asteroid 9175 Graun

== Fiction ==
- 002, fictional British 00 Agent
- 002 Operazione Luna, a 1965 Italian film
- Zero Two, a Darling in the Franxx character

== Guantanamo detainee 002 ==
- David Hicks (born 1975), Australian who was convicted by the US Guantanamo military commission
- Detainee 002: The Case of David Hicks, a 2007 book by Leigh Sales

== Patents ==
- Patents referred to as 'the '002 patent':
  - US patent 6493002, a patent owned by Apple Inc. involved in a legal case with Samsung
  - US patent 7454002, a patent owned by SportBrain involved in a legal case with Apple Inc.

== Other uses ==
- 002, former emergency telephone number for the Norwegian police (until 1986)
- BAR 002, 2000 Formula One season car
- O02 (allele), an allele of the ABO gene
- Oo2, a training center
- Type 002 aircraft carrier, a Chinese aircraft carrier currently under construction
- Tyrrell 002, a Formula One car raced in 1971-1972
- 0–0–2 or zero-zero-two, the starting score for a game of doubles pickleball
