= Nevada State Route 373 =

Highway in Nevada

State Route 373
- Death Valley Junction Road
- SR 373 highlighted in red

Route information
- Maintained by NDOT
- Length: 16.304 mi (26.239 km)
- Existed: July 1, 1976–present

Major junctions
- South end: SR 127 at the California state line near Death Valley Junction, CA
- North end: US 95 in Amargosa Valley

Location
- Country: United States
- State: Nevada
- County: Nye

Highway system
- Nevada State Highway System; Interstate; US; State; Pre‑1976; Scenic
← SR 372	→ SR 374

State Route 373 (SR 373) is a 16.304-mile-long (26.239 km) state highway in Nye County, Nevada, United States. It is a highway connecting California State Route 127 to U.S. Route 95, providing southern Nye County access to the eastern areas of Death Valley National Park.

== Route description ==
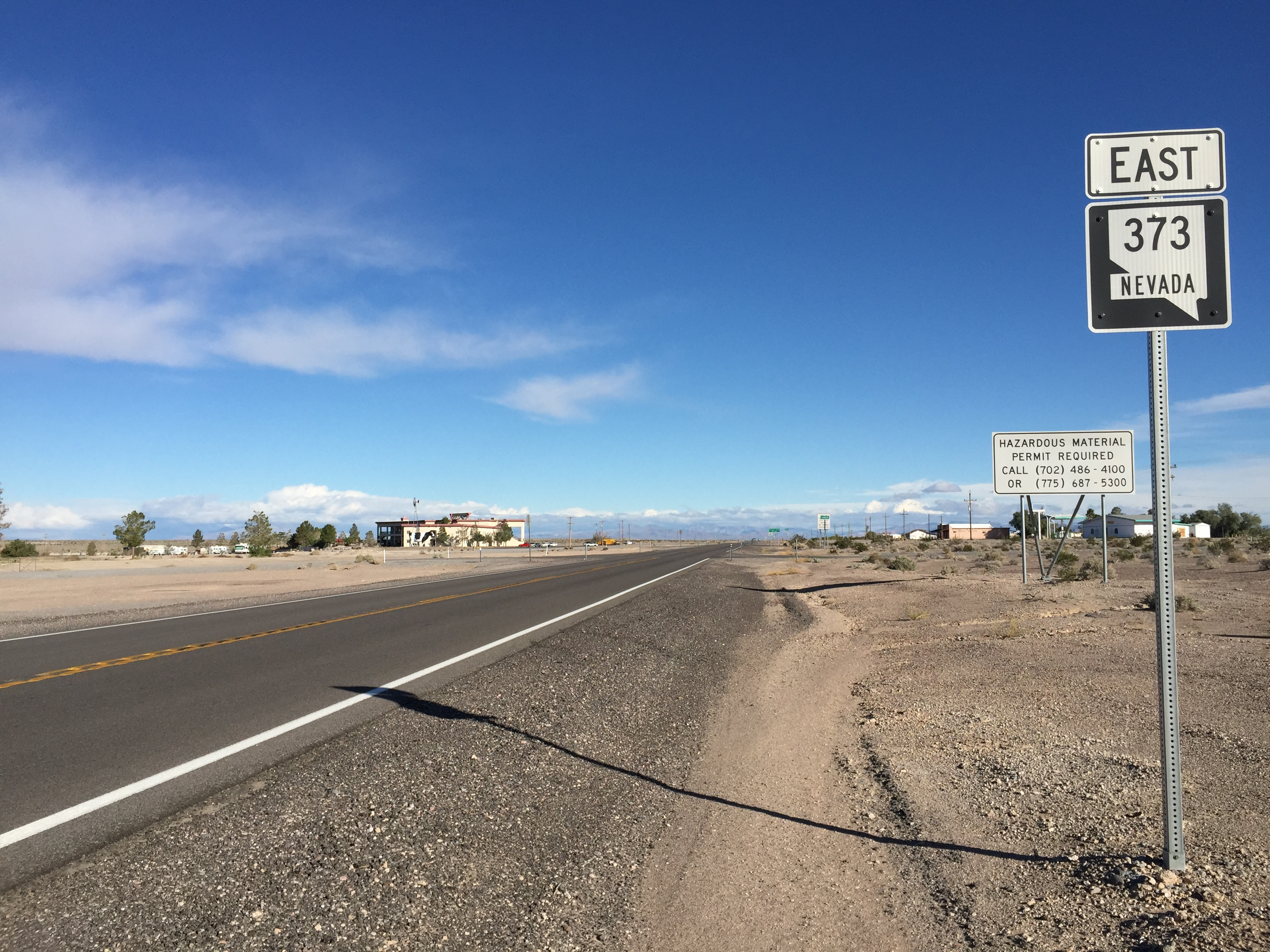
View from the south end of SR 373 looking northbound as seen in 2015

State Route 373 begins at the California state line, approximately 8 miles (13 km) north of the town of Death Valley Junction, California on California SR 127. The highway heads almost due north from this location, passing through the Amargosa Valley. On the west side of the highway, the farm lands and homes of the community of Amargosa Valley come into view. The route continues north from here to its terminus at US 95, near the former site of Lathrop Wells.

== History ==
SR 373 was assigned to State Route 29 before 1976.

An unimproved road through Amargosa Valley, connecting Nevada to Death Valley Junction, appears on state maps as early as 1927. This route crossed the state line roughly where the current highway crosses now, but instead veered northwest to State Route 5 (now US 95) southwest of Beatty near the now defunct town of Caracca. The road, which paralleled the tracks of the Tonopah and Tidewater Railroad to the west, was recognized as State Route 29 by 1932. By 1935, SR 29 had been moved to a new, paved roadway resembling the alignment of the present-day highway.

SR 29 remained unchanged for several years, until July 1, 1976. At that time, it was rechristened as State Route 373 as part of the 1976 renumbering of Nevada's state highways. State highway maps first reflected this change in 1978.

== Major intersections ==
The entire route is in Nye County.

Location	mi	km	Destinations	Notes
	0.000	0.000	SR 127 south – Death Valley Junction	Continuation beyond the California state line
Amargosa Valley	16.304	26.239	US 95 – Las Vegas, Beatty	Northern terminus
1.000 mi = 1.609 km; 1.000 km = 0.621 mi
