= Ibex Pass =

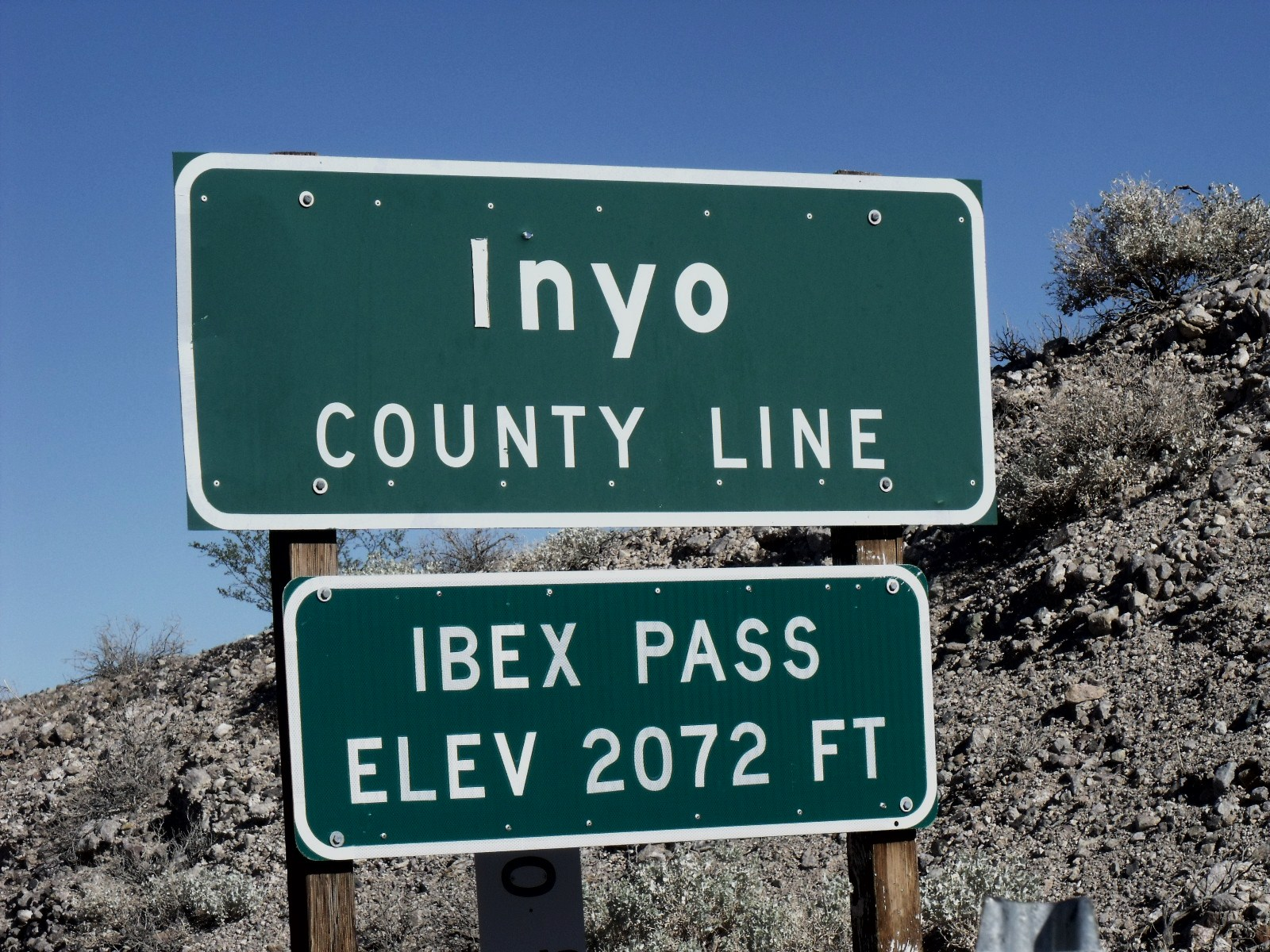
- The summit of Ibex Pass
- Interactive map of Ibex Pass
- Elevation: 2,072 feet (632 m)
- Traversed by: SR 127

Third Approach
- Location: Inyo County-San Bernardino County, California border, US
- Range: Sperry Hills
- Coordinates: 35°47′40″N 116°20′26″W

Ibex Pass [el. 2,072 ft (632 m)] is a mountain pass in the Sperry Hills of Central-Southern California in the United States.

The pass is at the summit in a range of desert hills between the Baker area and the Shoshone area and is located on the border of Inyo County and San Bernardino County. The pass connects Interstate 15 with access to Death Valley National Park, and it is traversed by State Route 127. A ghost town called Ibex Springs, from 1940s talc mining, is located about two miles south of the pass. The nearest settlement is Tecopa, located 10 miles away by road.
