= Baker Airport (disambiguation) =

Baker Airport may refer to:

- Baker Airport in Baker, California, US (FAA: 0O2)
- Baker Municipal Airport in Baker, Montana, US (FAA/IATA: BHK)
- Baker City Municipal Airport in Baker City, Oregon, US (FAA: BKE)
