= Amargosa Opera House and Hotel =

Historic building and cultural center in eastern Inyo County, California

Coordinates: 36°18′08″N 116°24′53″W

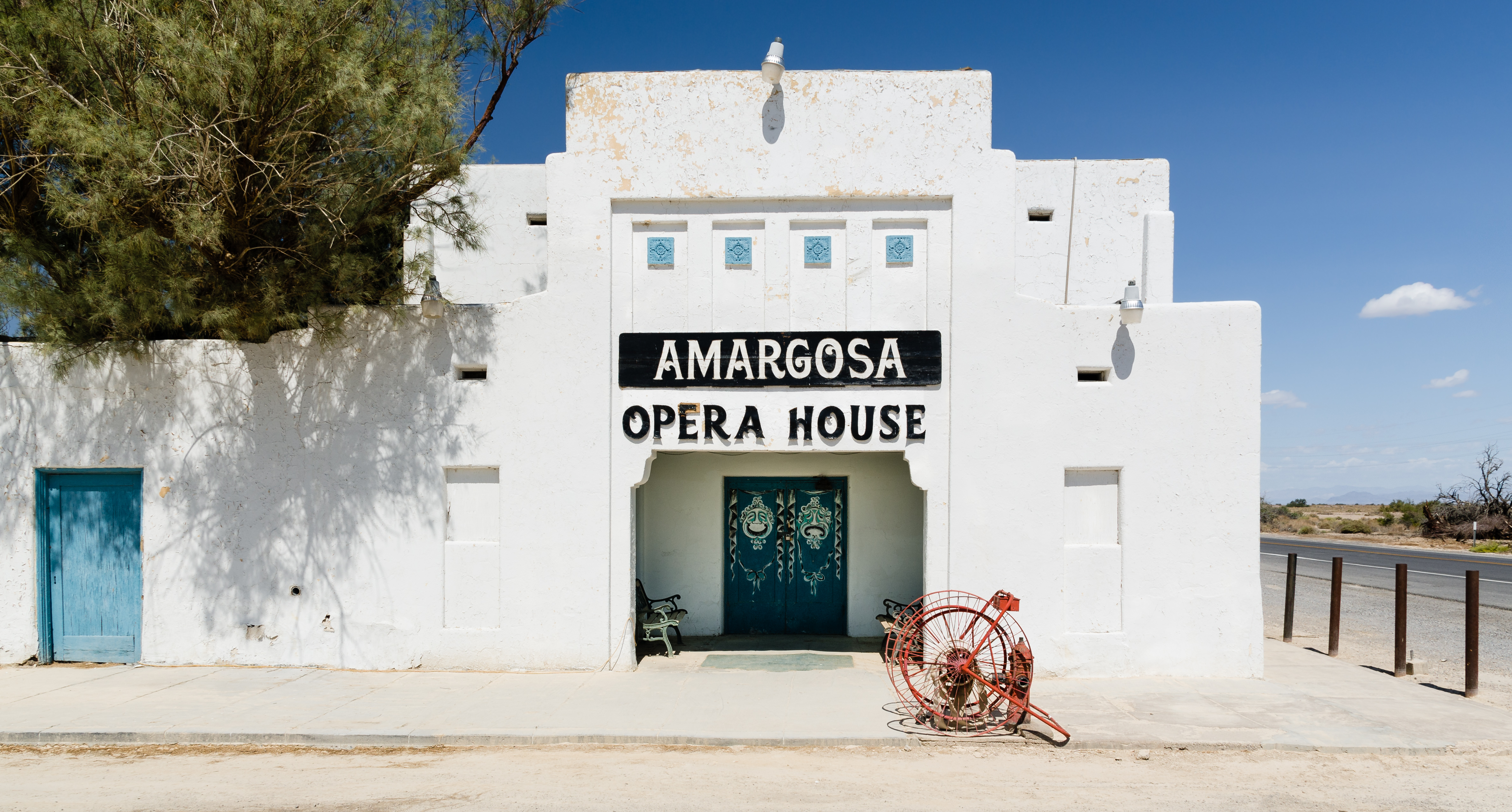
When Marta Becket rented and repaired Corkhill Hall in 1967, she changed the name to the Amargosa Opera House.

Amargosa Opera House and Hotel is a historic building, hotel, and cultural center located in Death Valley Junction, in eastern Inyo County, California near Death Valley National Park.

Resident artist Marta Becket staged dance and mime shows there from the late 1960s until her final show in February 2012. The Death Valley Junction Historic District is on the National Register of Historic Places and is owned by the nonprofit established by Becket for the preservation of the property. The hotel on the property is still in operation as of 2026.

The theater was part of a company town designed by architect Alexander Hamilton McCulloch and constructed in 1923–25 by the Pacific Coast Borax Company. The U-shaped complex of Spanish Colonial Revival architecture style adobe buildings included company offices, employees' headquarters, a dormitory and a 23-room hotel with a dining room, lobby and store. At the northeast end of the complex was a recreation hall used as a community center for dances, church services, movies, funerals and town meetings.

== History ==
When the town of Amargosa was booming due to the Borax mining business, and its position at the terminus of the Tonopah and Tidewater Railroad, about 350 people lived in the town. The hotel served as a very nice place to stay for both company executives and visiting investors, who were met at the train with white-gloved valets after a long and hot train ride. In addition to the hotel rooms, the cafe and a restaurant within the hotel, other rooms were bunkhouses for workers, an infirmary, a general store and what is now the Opera House, which was mostly used for showing films.

A large gas station and garage across from the cafe was the only location in the area for repairs of trucks hauling borax out of the mines, in addition to passenger car repairs. When the Tonopah and Tidewater Railroad ceased to be economical in 1942, the tracks were torn up completely and sent to Egypt, where the railroad was set up again to aid the Allied military effort in north Africa. Once the railroad stopped, the Opera House, Hotel and about 250 acres of land changed hands many times, until Marta Becket arrived on the scene.

Marta Becket rented the recreation hall in 1967, when it was known as Corkhill Hall; she began repairs, created the sets, and painted murals on the adobe walls. She renamed it the Amargosa, the original name of the former mining town. In 1970, journalists from National Geographic discovered Becket doing a performance at the Amargosa Opera House without an audience. Their profile and another in Life led to an international interest in Becket and her theater. She began performing to visitors from around the world, including such notables as Ray Bradbury and Red Skelton.

In 1974, Becket completed her murals and established the nonprofit Amargosa Opera House, Inc. to continue preservation of the property. Through the Trust for Public Land, the nonprofit bought the town of Death Valley Junction, which was listed in the National Register of Historic Places on December 10, 1981. In 1983, the Opera House bought 120 theater seats from the Boulder City Theater in Boulder City, Nevada to replace the worn garden chairs and the official National Register of Historic Places marker for Death Valley Junction was placed.

Jenna McClintock saw a performance when she was six years old and was inspired to start training in ballet. After a career with the Oakland Ballet, Jenna returned to thank Marta, and decided to stay and maintain the tradition. Jenna retired from the Amargosa Opera House in the spring of 2016.

The Amargosa Hotel is open year-round for visitors. Beyond these maintained areas, the town of Death Valley Junction is almost a ghost town. There are no gas stations. The single restaurant, the Amargosa Cafe, was formerly operated by the Opera House and Hotel, but is no longer open.

== Location ==
The Amargosa Opera House and Hotel is located on California State Route 127 in Death Valley Junction at the junction of National Scenic Byway, California State Route 190, California State Route 127, Furnace Creek Inn area and Death Valley National Park, 27 miles (43 km) northwest. South is the town of Shoshone, California, and the Tecopa Hot Springs. The Nevada state line is five miles to the northeast.

== In popular culture ==
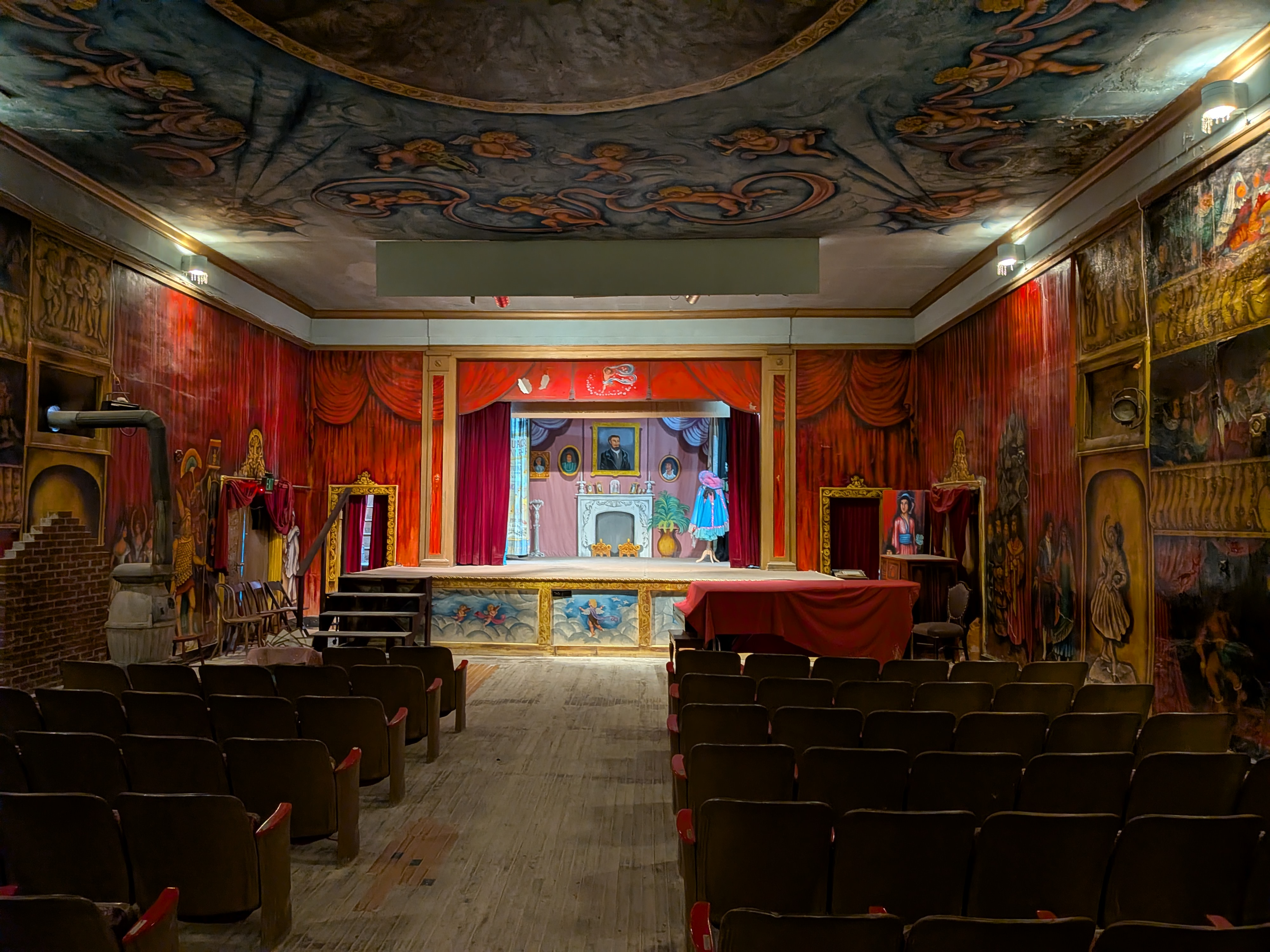
Inside the theater at the Opera House

It was one of three motels covered by Christian Blackwood's 1989 documentary Motel. The documentary was nominated for an Emmy Award for "Outstanding Individual - Informational Programming".

As the Lost Highway Hotel, it was featured in David Lynch's Lost Highway.

The exterior of the Amargosa Opera House was also shown in the movies The Hitcher and Carl Colpaert's Delusion, also in the 2020 miniseries The Stand. The exterior of the adjacent cafe and hotel colonnade were shown in a 40 second segment of Robert Plant's video of his 1983 song Big Log. The interior of the Opera House features in the video of the Lighthouse Family's song "Lifted".

Todd Robinson's documentary, Amargosa (2000) about Marta Becket and Amargosa won a 2003 Emmy Award for cinematographer Curt Apduhan and was a finalist for an Academy Award nomination for Best Documentary Feature, in addition to numerous festival awards and nominations.

Reports of hauntings in the buildings were investigated on the paranormal television shows Ghost Adventures in 2010 and The Dead Files in 2013.

Becket and the Amargosa Opera House feature prominently in Nicolette Polek's book Bitter Water Opera.

== Local interest ==
=== Features ===
- Amargosa River
- Amargosa Valley
- Amargosa Pupfish Station
- Ash Meadows National Wildlife Refuge

=== History ===
- Death Valley Junction, California
- Death Valley Railroad
- Francis Marion Smith, the "Borax King"
- Lila C, California
- Ryan, California
- Tonopah and Tidewater Railroad, the "T&T"

== See also ==
- Death Valley
