= Longstreet Hotel, Casino, and RV Resort =

Casino hotel in Nevada, United States

Longstreet Inn, Casino & RV Resort
- Location: 4400 Hwy 373 at Stateline, Amargosa Valley, NV 89020
- No. of rooms: 60
- Casino type: Land
- Owner: Jim Marsh
- Website: longstreetcasino.com

Longstreet Inn, Casino and RV Resort is located on State Route 373, in Amargosa Valley, Nevada, seven miles north of Death Valley Junction. The resort has a nine-hole golf course, 60 rooms, an RV park with 51 spaces, as well as a casino, a bar and two restaurants.
