= Marta Becket =

American painter

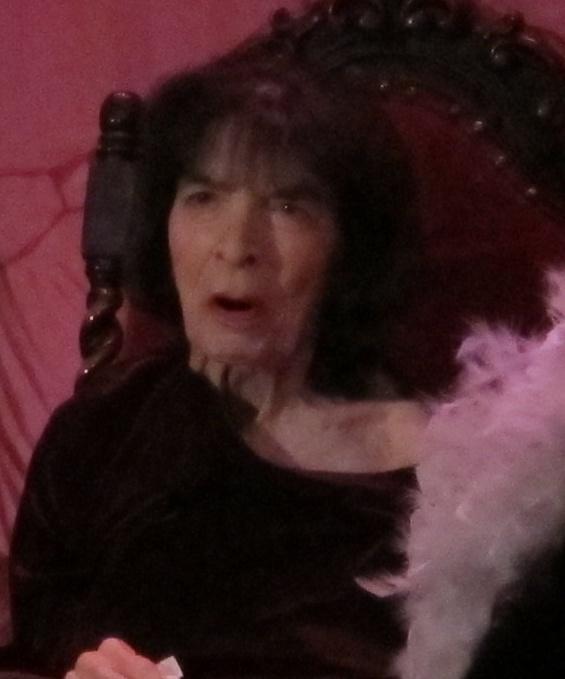
- Marta Beckett's last show at the Amargosa Opera House, February 12, 2012
- Born: Martha Beckett; August 9, 1924; New York, New York
- Died: January 30, 2017 (aged 92); Death Valley Junction, California
- Occupations: Actress; dancer; choreographer; painter
- Known for: Performed for more than four decades at her own theater, the Amargosa Opera House in Death Valley Junction, California
- Notable work: Show Boat, A Tree Grows in Brooklyn and Wonderful Town

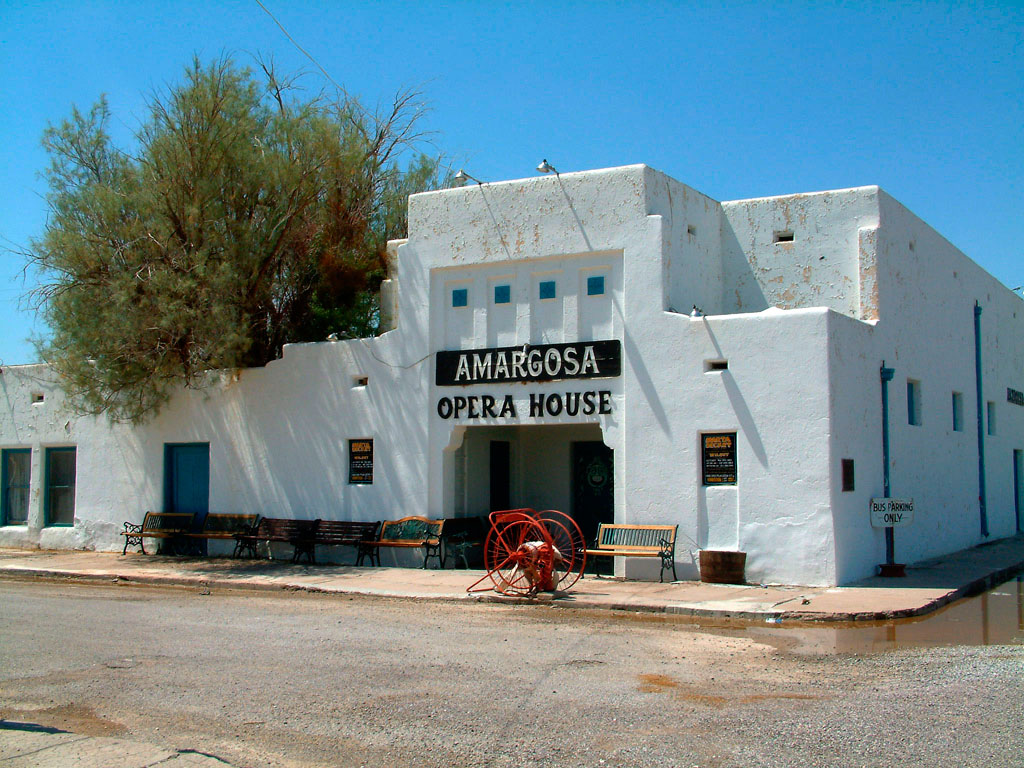
When Marta Becket rented and repaired Corkhill Hall in 1967, she changed the name to the Amargosa Opera House.

Marta Becket (born Martha Beckett, August 9, 1924 – January 30, 2017) was an American actress, dancer, choreographer and painter. She performed for more than four decades at her own theater, the Amargosa Opera House in Death Valley Junction, California.

Amargosa (2000), Todd Robinson's documentary about Marta Becket, won a 2003 Emmy Award for cinematographer Curt Apduhan, in addition to the film's numerous festival awards and nominations.

== Early life and career in New York ==
Becket began ballet lessons at age 14, which eventually led to performances as a ballerina. She was in the corps de ballet at Radio City Music Hall and on Broadway she appeared in Show Boat, A Tree Grows in Brooklyn and Wonderful Town. Later, she took her one-woman show across the country, performing in small theaters and school auditoriums. She married in 1962, and she was on her way with her husband to an engagement in 1967 when, due to a flat tire, she discovered a theater in Death Valley Junction and decided to stay.

== Relocation to Death Valley and operation of Amargosa Opera House ==
The theater was part of a company town designed by architect Alexander Hamilton McCulloch and constructed in 1923–24 by the Pacific Coast Borax Company. The U-shaped complex of Mexican Colonial-style adobe buildings included company offices, a store, a dorm, a 23-room hotel, dining room, lobby and employees' headquarters. At the northeast end of the complex was a recreation hall used as a community center for dances, church services, movies, funerals and town meetings.

Becket rented the recreation hall, then known as Corkhill Hall, began repairs and changed the name to the Amargosa Opera House. In 1970, journalists from National Geographic discovered Becket doing a performance at the Amargosa Opera House without an audience. Their profile and another in Life led to an international interest in Becket and her theater. She began performing to visitors from around the world, including such notables as Ray Bradbury and Red Skelton.

Becket's life in Amargosa Hotel and her performance in the Amargosa Opera House are chronicled in Christian Blackwood's 1989 documentary Motel.

In later years, Becket dropped the dancing to perform weekly The Sitting Down Show. Becket ceased performing in her Amargosa Opera House at the end of the 2008-09 season but began performing again in 2010. Her final show was February 12, 2012.

Becket occupied the theater since 1968, and personally created the murals and sets. The performances were a source of income for both the Opera House (now owned by Marta's non-profit organization) and the entire town.

== Death ==
Becket died on January 30, 2017, at her home in Death Valley Junction, California, from natural causes, aged 92.

== Legacy ==
At Death Valley Junction, near the Amargosa Opera House and Hotel, is the Marta Becket Monument, celebrating her 90th Birthday and her 50 years at Death Valley Junction.

== Books ==
- Her autobiography, To Dance on Sands: The Life and Art of Death Valley's Marta Becket, edited by Ginger Mikkelsen Meurer, was published in 2007.
- For the book Star Performance: The Story of the World's Great Ballerinas, by Walter Terry (Doubleday, 1956), Becket did 42 full-page illustrations, plus ten smaller illustrations for the glossary.
