= World's Tallest Thermometer =

American roadside attraction and landmark

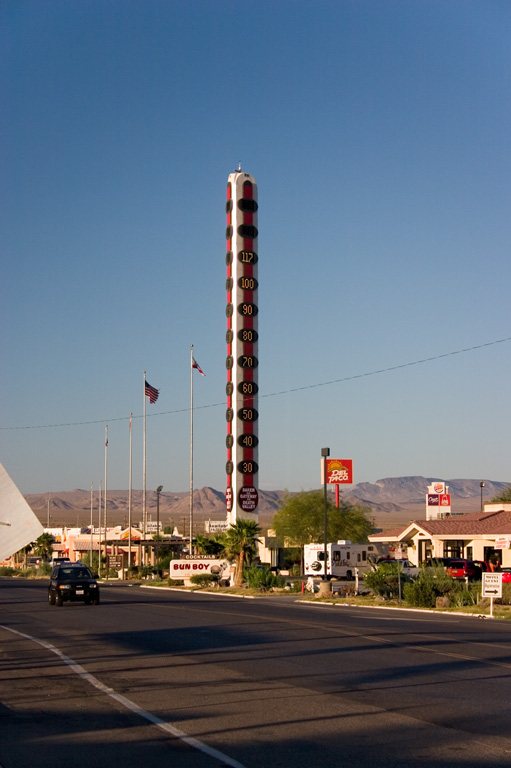
- World's Tallest Thermometer, 2003
- Interactive map of the World's Tallest Thermometer area

General information
- Status: Completed
- Type: Sign
- Location: 72157 Baker Boulevard; Baker, California; United States
- Coordinates: 35.26644°N 116.07275°W
- Completed: 1991
- Renovated: 2014
- Cost: $700,000
- Renovation cost: $150,000
- Owner: Herron family

Height
- Height: 134 feet (41 m)

Dimensions
- Weight: 76,812 pounds (34,841 kg)

Design and construction
- Main contractor: Young Electric Sign Company

Website
- worldstallestthermometer.com

The World's Tallest Thermometer is a landmark in Baker, California, US. It is a steel electric sign that commemorates the weather record of 134 °F (57 °C) recorded in nearby Death Valley on July 10, 1913.

The sign weighs 76,812 pounds (34,841 kg; 34.841 t) and is held together by 125 cubic yards (96 m^{3}) of concrete. It stands 134 feet (41 m) tall and is capable of displaying a maximum temperature of 134 °F (57 °C; 330 K), both of which are a reference to the temperature record.

== History ==
It was built in 1991 by the Young Electric Sign Company of Salt Lake City, Utah for Willis Herron, a Baker businessman who spent US$700,000 (equivalent to $1,655,000 in 2025) to build the thermometer next to his Bun Boy restaurant. Its height—134 feet (41 m)—was in honor of the 134-degree record temperature set in nearby Death Valley on July 10, 1913. The thermometer is electric and registers temperatures using an outside source. The thermometer displays temperatures in 10 degree increments.

Soon after its construction, 70 mph (110 km/h; 31 m/s) winds snapped the thermometer in half, and it was rebuilt. Two years later, severe gusts made the thermometer sway so much that its light bulbs popped out. Concrete was then poured inside the steel core to reinforce the monument.

Herron sold the attraction and restaurant to another local businessman in 2003, Larry Dabour, who sold it in 2005. In September 2012, the owner at that time, Matt Pike, said that the power bill for its operation had reached US$8,000 per month (equivalent to $11,000 in 2025) and that he turned it off due to the poor economy.

In 2013, the thermometer and accompanying empty gift shop were listed for sale. The family of Willis Herron (who died in 2007) recovered ownership of the property in 2014 and stated their intention to make it operational again. The renovation was funded with sweat equity and a contribution from the owner's mother of US$150,000 (equivalent to $207,000 in 2025). The original light bulbs were replaced with LED lights and the official re-lighting took place on July 10, 2014.

In July 2016 the thermometer was featured in a series of promotional events held by Google to celebrate new features added to Google Maps. Visitors were able to try "the world’s coldest coffee" as part of the promotion. In December 2016, EVgo announced building the first US fast charge station for electric vehicles at up to 350 kW. The station is located in the thermometer parking area.
