= Alien Fresh Jerky =

Jerky company in California

Coordinates: 35.2687°N 116.0706°W

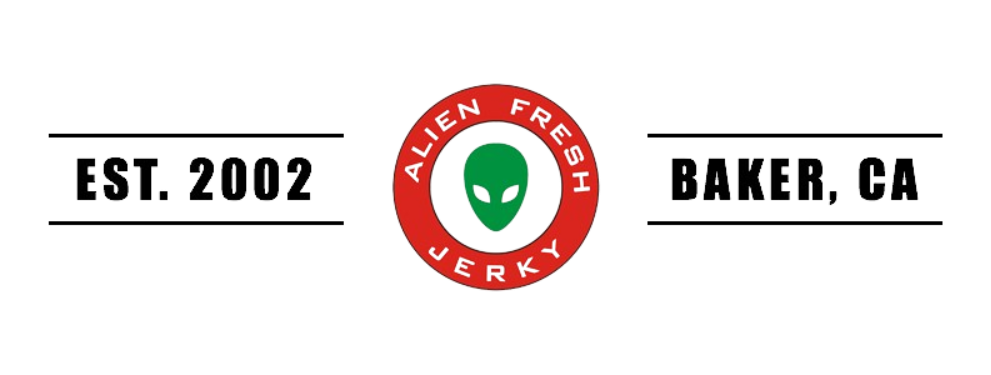

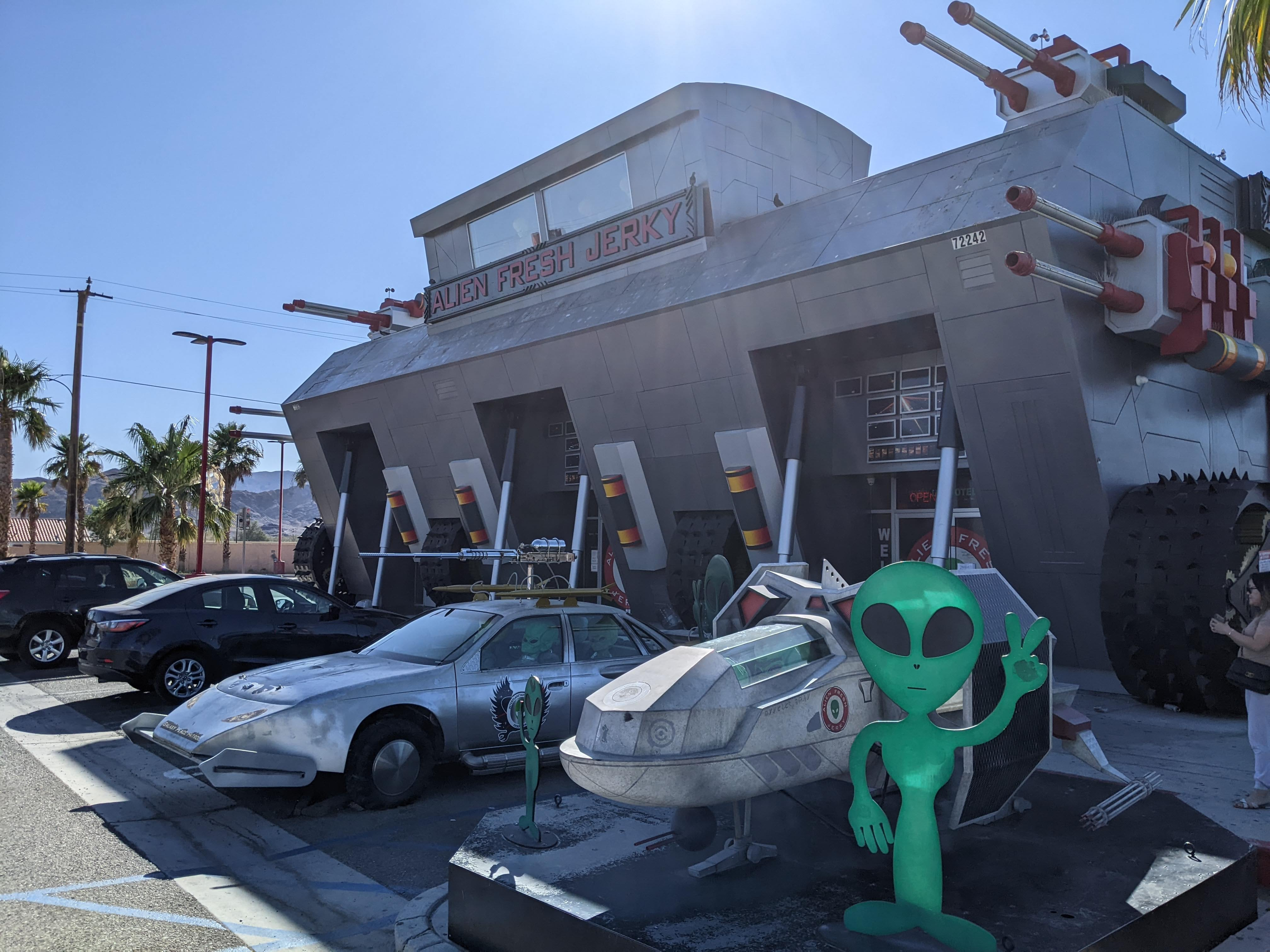
- The main store in 2022
- Company type: Private
- Industry: Foodservice, tourism
- Founded: 2000
- Founder: Luis Ramallo
- Headquarters: Baker, California
- Area served: Southwestern United States
- Website: www.alienfreshjerky.com

Alien Fresh Jerky is a jerky-retailing company based in Baker, California. It was founded in 2000 and places its products in many stores throughout the Southwestern United States.

Its main store is located at 72302 Baker Blvd in Baker. It is a common stop for hundreds of thousands of people driving from Southern California to Las Vegas. The store covers 4,800 sq ft (450 m^{2}). When it was first bought in 2002, it was only 800 sq ft (74 m^{2}).

== History ==
Luis Ramallo moved, with his family, to the United States from Argentina in 1988. In 2000, Ramallo created the company, with the help of his eldest son, Martin, and wife Susana. Its first stand was in Crystal Springs, Nevada at the intersection of US 93 and SR 318. He made $800 on his first day and continued to operate the stand for four months until the police asked to see his work permits. He got the "alien" theme from his "registered alien" designation as an immigrant. Ramallo had an electrical business in Las Vegas before Alien Fresh Jerky but closed it in 2004 to pursue the company.
