= Baker, California =

Census designated place in California, United States

- Census designated place
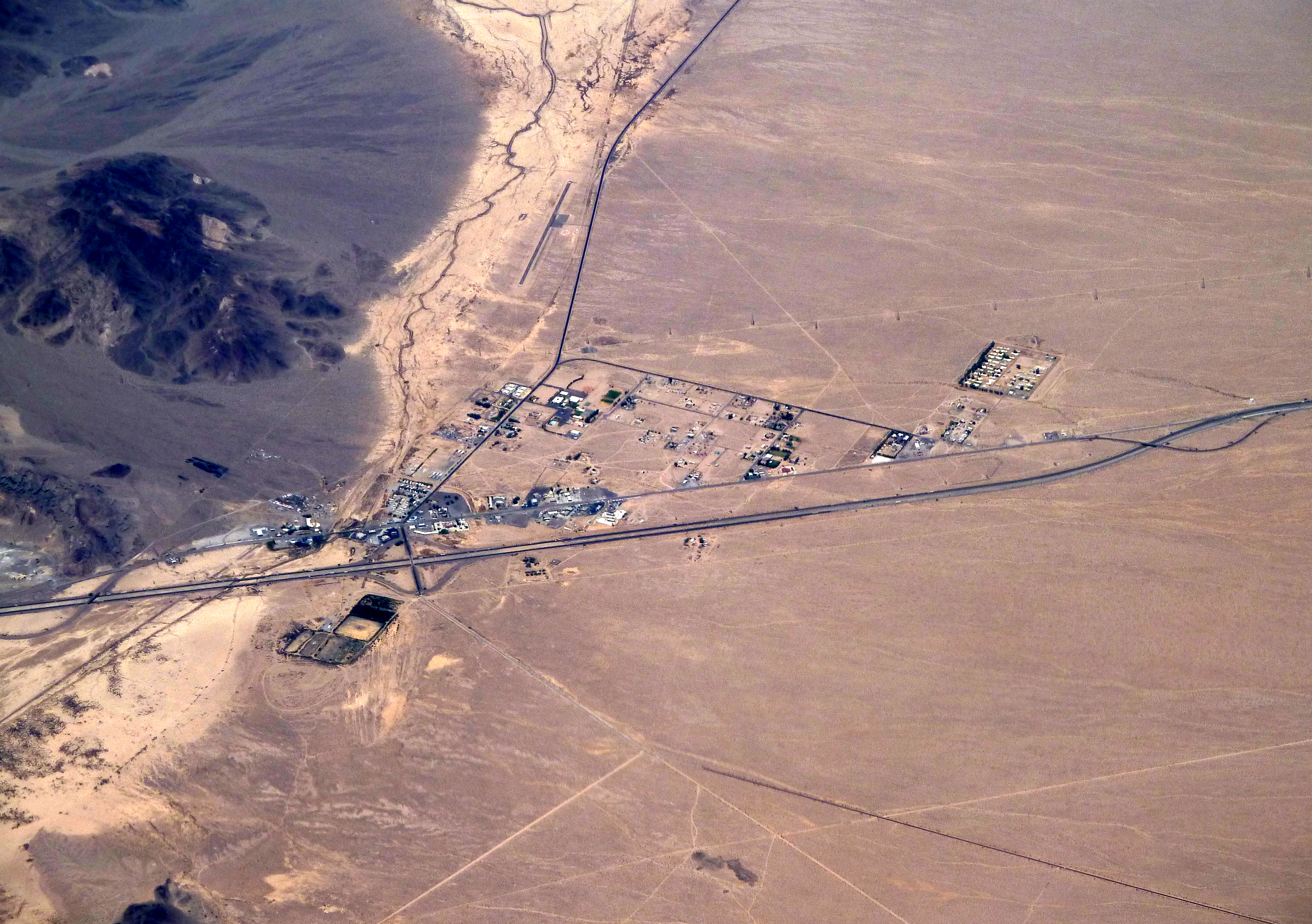
- Aerial view of Baker looking north: I-15 jogs south around the town, leaving Baker Boulevard, the main street, to show where the pre-interstate highway (US 91 and US 466) went. Baker Airport sits just north of the city alongside northbound CA 127, the "Death Valley Road".

- Location in San Bernardino County and the state of California

- Location within California Location within the United States
- Coordinates: 35°16′37″N 116°04′18″W
- Country: United States
- State: California
- County: San Bernardino

Area
  - Total: 2.69 sq mi (6.96 km^{2})
  - Land: 2.69 sq mi (6.96 km^{2})
  - Water: 0 sq mi (0.00 km^{2}) 0%
- Elevation: 942 ft (287 m)

Population (2020)
  - Total: 442
  - Density: 164.4/sq mi (63.49/km^{2})
- Time zone: UTC-8 (Pacific)
  - Summer (DST): UTC-7 (PDT)
- ZIP codes: 92309
- Area codes: 442/760
- FIPS code: 06-03512
- GNIS feature ID: 2628708

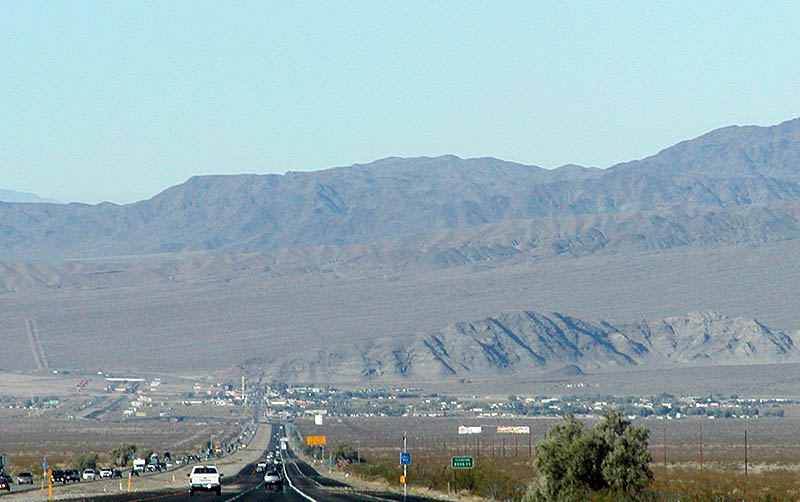
View of Baker from the east on I-15

Baker is a census-designated place located in San Bernardino County, California, US. As of the 2020 census, the CDP had a total population of 442. Baker's ZIP Code is 92309 and the community is within area codes 442 and 760.

== History ==
Baker was founded as a station on the Tonopah and Tidewater Railroad in 1908 and was named for Richard C. Baker, business partner of Francis Marion Smith in building the railroad. Baker later became president of the T&T himself.

Baker was established in 1929 by Ralph Jacobus Fairbanks (1857–1942), who was an American prospector, entrepreneur, and pioneer who established several towns in the Death Valley area of California, including Fairbanks Springs (1904–05) and Shoshone (1910).

It is the site of a vacant, 223-bed for-profit prison formerly operated by Cornell Corrections which experienced a major riot on December 2, 2003, four weeks before it was temporarily closed. It was permanently closed on December 25, 2009. GEO Group purchased Cornell Companies, its owner, on August 12, 2010. It had previously experienced escapes in August and November 1995 and two on July 15, 1997.

== Geography and climate ==
Baker is located in the Mojave Desert at the junction of Interstate 15 and SR 127 (Death Valley Road). Its elevation is approximately 930 feet (283.5 m) above sea level, which is much lower than either Barstow or Las Vegas, due to its location at the southern end of the Death Valley geological depression. The Cronese Mountains are located southwest of the community. According to the United States Census Bureau, the CDP covers an area of 2.7 square miles (7.0 km^{2}), all of it land. Summer temperatures in Baker routinely exceed 110 °F (43.3 °C); 2007 saw a record of 125 °F (51.7 °C).

Climate data for Baker, California
Month	Jan	Feb	Mar	Apr	May	Jun	Jul	Aug	Sep	Oct	Nov	Dec	Year
Record high °F (°C)	80 (27)	92 (33)	96 (36)	106 (41)	116 (47)	119 (48)	124 (51)	124 (51)	119 (48)	110 (43)	92 (33)	82 (28)	124 (51)
Mean daily maximum °F (°C)	63.1 (17.3)	68.6 (20.3)	76.8 (24.9)	84.3 (29.1)	94.9 (34.9)	104.8 (40.4)	110.2 (43.4)	107.9 (42.2)	100.2 (37.9)	87.1 (30.6)	72.6 (22.6)	62.4 (16.9)	86.1 (30.1)
Mean daily minimum °F (°C)	34.6 (1.4)	39.4 (4.1)	45.6 (7.6)	51.7 (10.9)	61.3 (16.3)	70.2 (21.2)	77.0 (25.0)	75.4 (24.1)	67.2 (19.6)	54.7 (12.6)	42.8 (6.0)	33.9 (1.1)	54.5 (12.5)
Record low °F (°C)	16 (−9)	21 (−6)	24 (−4)	34 (1)	38 (3)	43 (6)	53 (12)	54 (12)	42 (6)	32 (0)	23 (−5)	14 (−10)	14 (−10)
Average precipitation inches (mm)	0.47 (12)	0.71 (18)	0.51 (13)	0.20 (5.1)	0.11 (2.8)	0.07 (1.8)	0.27 (6.9)	0.46 (12)	0.41 (10)	0.25 (6.4)	0.31 (7.9)	0.41 (10)	4.19 (106)
Source: The Western Regional Climate Center

== Demographics ==
Historical population
Census	Pop.	Note	%±
2010	735		—
2020	442		−39.9%
U.S. Decennial Census; 1850–1870 1880-1890; 1900 1910 1920; 1930 1940 1950; 1960 1970 1980; 1990 2000 2010

Baker first appeared as a census designated place in the 2010 U.S. census.

=== Racial and ethnic composition ===
Baker CDP, California – Racial and ethnic composition Note: the US Census treats Hispanic/Latino as an ethnic category. This table excludes Latinos from the racial categories and assigns them to a separate category. Hispanics/Latinos may be of any race.
Race / Ethnicity (NH = Non-Hispanic)	Pop 2010	Pop 2020	% 2010	% 2020
White alone (NH)	195	67	26.53%	15.16%
Black or African American alone (NH)	1	2	0.14%	0.45%
Native American or Alaska Native alone (NH)	3	4	0.41%	0.90%
Asian alone (NH)	10	8	1.36%	1.81%
Native Hawaiian or Pacific Islander alone (NH)	14	5	1.90%	1.13%
Other race alone (NH)	4	1	0.54%	0.23%
Mixed race or Multiracial (NH)	6	10	0.82%	2.26%
Hispanic or Latino (any race)	502	345	68.30%	78.05%
Total	735	442	100.00%	100.00%

=== 2020 census ===
As of the 2020 census, Baker had a population of 442. The population density was 164.4 inhabitants per square mile (63.5/km^{2}). The median age was 28.6 years. 33.7% of residents were under the age of 18, 11.1% were aged 18 to 24, 24.7% were aged 25 to 44, 24.4% were aged 45 to 64, and 6.1% were 65 years of age or older. For every 100 females there were 101.8 males, and for every 100 females age 18 and over there were 118.7 males age 18 and over. 0.0% of residents lived in urban areas, while 100.0% lived in rural areas.

There were 125 households in Baker, of which 40.8% had children under the age of 18 living in them. Of all households, 52.8% were married-couple households, 8.8% were cohabiting couple households, 21.6% were households with a male householder and no spouse or partner present, and 16.8% were households with a female householder and no spouse or partner present. About 21.6% of all households were made up of individuals and 5.6% had someone living alone who was 65 years of age or older. The average household size was 3.54. There were 89 families (71.2% of all households).

There were 167 housing units at an average density of 62.1 units per square mile (24.0 units/km^{2}), of which 125 (74.9%) were occupied. Of these, 28.0% were owner-occupied, and 72.0% were renter-occupied. The homeowner vacancy rate was 5.4% and the rental vacancy rate was 7.2%.

Racial composition as of the 2020 census
Race	Number	Percent
White	94	21.3%
Black or African American	2	0.5%
American Indian and Alaska Native	163	36.9%
Asian	8	1.8%
Native Hawaiian and Other Pacific Islander	5	1.1%
Some other race	124	28.1%
Two or more races	46	10.4%

== Economy ==
Baker's economy is based primarily on tourism. The town is frequently used as a stop for food and fuel by drivers on Interstate 15 between Los Angeles and Las Vegas. Baker is approximately 90 miles (144.8 km) southwest of Las Vegas. It is the last town for those traveling on SR 127 north to Death Valley National Park or south to the Mojave National Preserve. Until recently there was one motel in Baker, the Santa Fe Motel, formerly the Wills Fargo Motel, but as of 2023 the motel had closed.

Baker Airport is a small facility owned by the U.S. Department of the Interior, Bureau of Land Management, but it is managed by San Bernardino County Department of airports

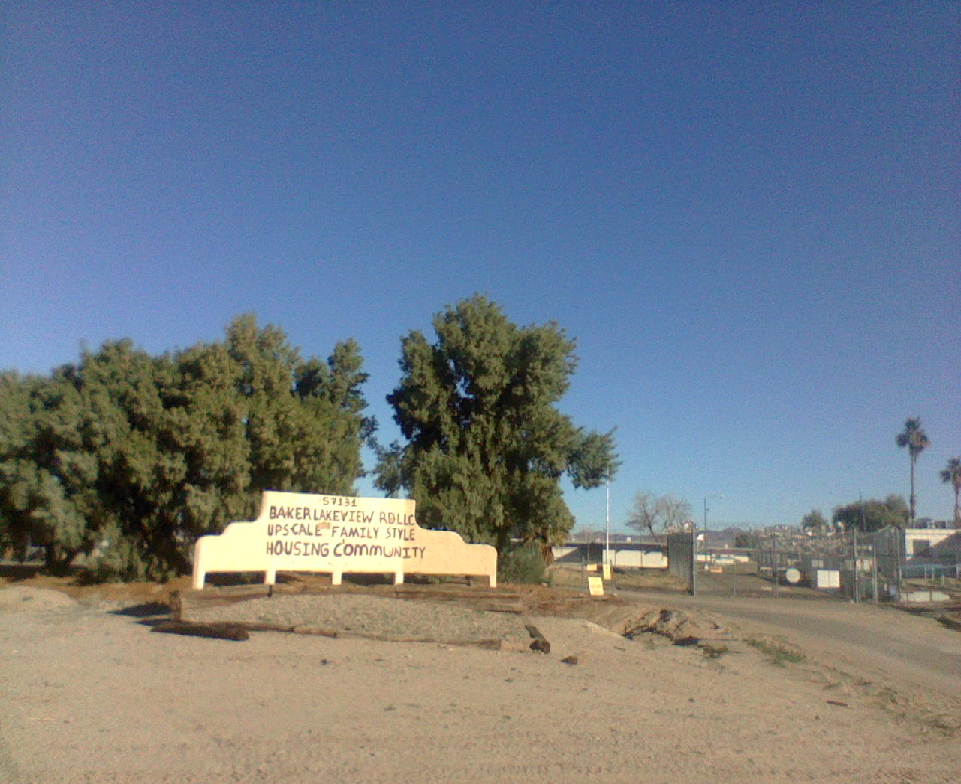
Former prison staff housing rentals

== Government ==
=== State and federal representation ===
In the California State Legislature, Baker is in the 19th senatorial district, represented by Republican Rosilicie Ochoa Bogh, and in the 34th Assembly district, represented by Republican Tom Lackey.

In the United States House of Representatives, Baker is in California's 23rd congressional district, represented by Republican Jay Obernolte.

Since Baker is an unincorporated community of San Bernardino County, County CEO, Leonard X. Hernandez, would be considered the Chief Administrator of Baker.

Water, Sanitary Sewers, Trash Collection Services, Fire Protection, Television Translators, Road Maintenance, Street Lighting, Park and Recreation is administered by the Baker Community Services District

== Mars rover test site ==
The Mars Science Laboratory Team tested an engineering model of the Curiosity rover in the desert near Baker.

== Education ==
The CDP is in the Baker Valley Unified School District.

== Attractions ==
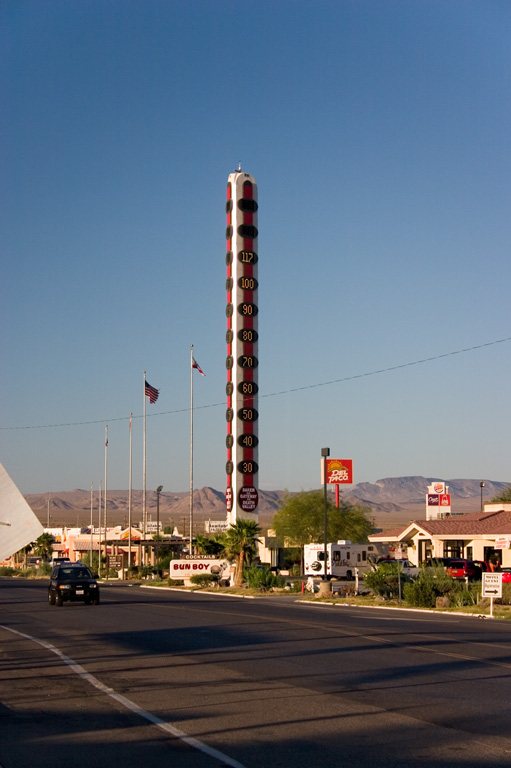
"World's tallest thermometer", in November 2003 in Baker, California

- The town's most prominent feature is a 134-foot (41 m) thermometer, dubbed "the world's tallest thermometer". Its height commemorates the hottest temperature ever recorded on Earth, 134 °F (56.7 °C), in nearby Death Valley on July 10, 1913. It was created by Willis Herron, who owned many businesses in Baker and, at one point, was said to have employed half of Baker's population. Hoping to draw more visitors into Baker, Herron partnered with Young Electric Sign Co. in 1991 to build the monument. It originally cost $750,000 to build and was blown over by high winds before it was officially lit. It was quickly rebuilt with a sturdier design. In 2005, Herron sold several of his businesses to Matt Pike in 2005 before dying in 2007. Visible for miles, Pike temporarily stopped its operation in 2012 due to expensive electric bills of $8,000/month and inaccurate temperature readings. When Herron's widow Barbara learned that the beloved landmark was being considered for demolition, she repurchased and refurbished it. The thermometer was relighted following restoration on July 10, 2014.
  - The thermometer was featured on the television show Strange Inheritance season 1 episode 13 on the Fox Business Network.
- Alien Fresh Jerky, a quirky store selling various types of jerky and alien-themed merchandise. The store is itself a tourist attraction with statues of aliens and architecture resembling galactic ships. Billboards on I-15 commonly feature the store. In 2020, the store came under fire for controversial racist remarks against Asians.
- Abandoned structures, such as the tiki-inspired Arnie's Royal Hawaiian Motel (opened in 1957, closed in 2009, formerly known as Grace's Oasis) and Bun Boy Restaurant and Motel (opened in 1926, closed in 2013), are popular amongst urban explorers.
- Dumont Dunes Off-Highway Vehicle Area, a popular area for ATV riders.
- Just a few miles to the west along I-15 lies the exit for Zzyzx Road. This dirt road leads to Soda Springs, the site of the health resort established by Curtis Springer in the late 1940s and now the Desert Study Center maintained by the California State University.
- A yearly race is held called "The Challenge Cup Relay: Baker to Vegas" or commonly referred as "Baker to Vegas" where law enforcement do a relay running race from Baker, CA to Las Vegas, NV. It attracts law enforcement agencies including LAPD, national, and international agencies to participate annually.

== In popular culture ==
- The 2003 film The Big Empty takes place in Baker, California. It was also filmed on-location.
- In the video game Fallout: New Vegas, the fictional town of Novac features as a main attraction the world's second-largest thermometer.
- The second season of the Fallout TV series utilized Baker as a filming location for scenes set in Novac.

== See also ==
- List of census-designated places in California
