= Caproni Ca.127 =

1930s Italian aircraft

Ca.127

General information
- Type: Reconnaissance
- Manufacturer: Caproni
- Status: prototype only
- Number built: 1

History
- First flight: 1935

The Caproni Ca.127 was a single-engine reconnaissance monoplane built by Caproni in the mid-1930s.

== Design ==
The Ca.127 was a single engine for distant reconnaissance; it was built with a metal structure and a fuselage, with a rectangular section, built in welded steel tubes covered in canvas. The empennages are single-celled, made of steel tubes covered with painted canvas. The drift and fixed altitude plan were adjustable in flight. The partially cantilever wings rested each on a metal strut that anchored to a knot in the fuselage; they were built in a light-alloy metal structure of the monospar type covered in cloth.

The landing gear was of the double axle type; the shock absorber was connected to the side member of the wing at the stiffening strut of the same. The wheels were equipped with aerodynamic fairings and used medium pressure tires with expanding brakes. The tail pad was sprung, with a swiveling wheel.

The cabin was dual-controlled, with side-by-side seats, and the glazed hood was connected to the rear with the median section of the wing. In the cockpit there was a telegraphic transceiver, a camera, and a front-firing machine gun.

Based on results of flight tests, the Ca.127 was judged unfit to perform its intended role and did not enter production.

== Specifications ==
Data from , Aeroplani Caproni dal 1908 al 1935

General characteristics

- Capacity: 1,000 kg (2,200 lb) payload
- Length: 12.82 m (42 ft 1 in)
- Wingspan: 16.9 m (55 ft 5 in)
- Height: 3.2 m (10 ft 6 in)
- Wing area: 40 m^{2} (430 sq ft)
- Empty weight: 2,200 kg (4,850 lb)
- Gross weight: 3,200 kg (7,055 lb)
- Powerplant: 1 × Isotta Fraschini XII R. V-12 water-cooled piston engine, 560 kW (750 hp)
- Propellers: 2-bladed fixed pitch wooden propeller or 3-bladedground-adjustable metal propeller

Performance

- Maximum speed: 305 km/h (190 mph, 165 kn)
- Range: 1,000 km (620 mi, 540 nmi)
- Time to altitude: 8,000 m (26,000 ft) in 46 minutes 25 seconds

Armament

- Guns: 5 × 7.7 mm (0.303 in) machine guns
