= California State Route 127 =

Highway in California

State Route 127
- SR 127 highlighted in red

Route information
- Maintained by Caltrans
- Length: 91.033 mi (146.503 km)

Major junctions
- South end: I-15 at Baker
- SR 178 at Shoshone; SR 190 at Death Valley Junction
- North end: SR 373 at Nevada state line south of Amargosa Valley, NV

Location
- Country: United States
- State: California
- Counties: San Bernardino, Inyo

Highway system
- State highways in California; Interstate; US; State; Scenic; History; Pre‑1964; Unconstructed; Deleted; Freeways
← SR 126	→ SR 128

State Route 127 (SR 127) is a state highway in the U.S. state of California that connects Interstate 15 in Baker to Nevada State Route 373 at the Nevada state line, passing near the eastern boundary of Death Valley National Park. The entire length of the highway closely follows the central portion of the former Tonopah and Tidewater Railroad and loosely follows the Amargosa River.

== Route description ==
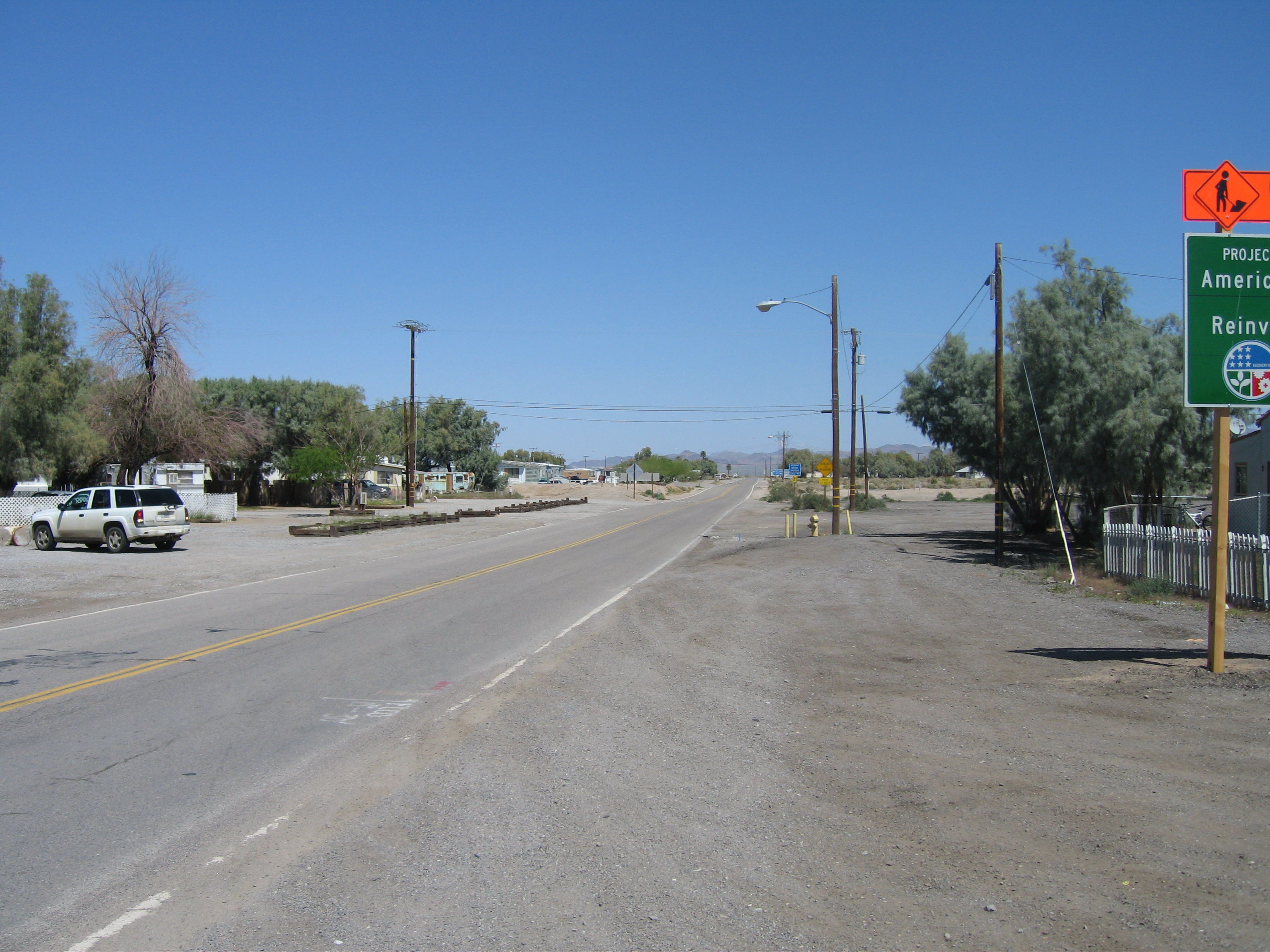
SR 127 in Baker, looking in Death Valley direction

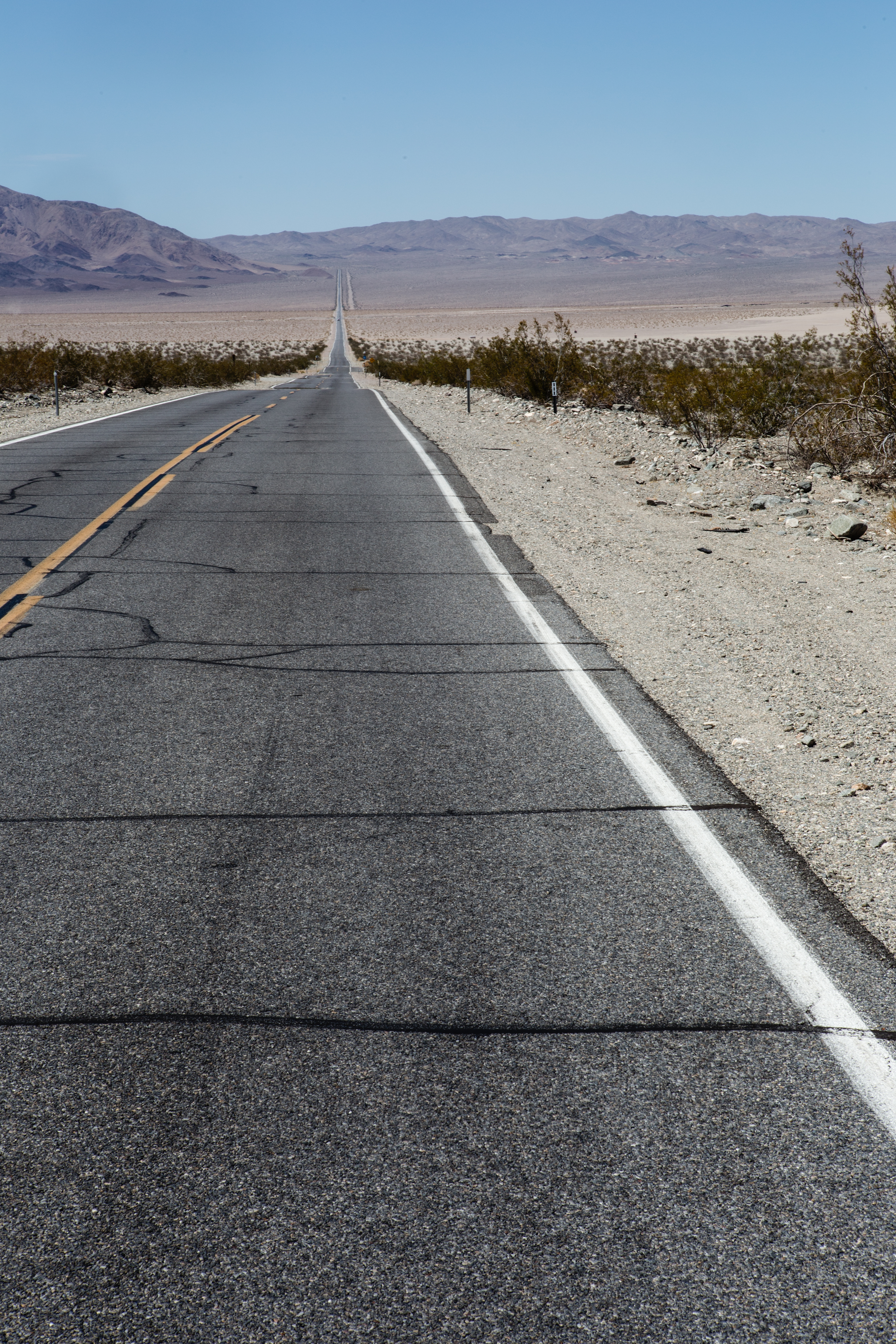
Looking north along SR 127 about halfway between Baker and Shoshone.

Route 127 is defined in section 427 of the California Streets and Highways Code, and that the highway is "from Route 15 near Baker to the Nevada state line via the vicinity of Death Valley Junction".

The highway begins at I-15 in the community of Baker, the last town travelers from the Greater Los Angeles area or the Las Vegas Valley see before making their trek across Death Valley. SR 127 travels through the town of Baker as Death Valley Road before turning slightly northwest and traveling along the edge of Silver Lake, a dry lake. The road parallels Salt Creek and Silurian Lake as it crosses the Valjean Valley. SR 127 soon runs along the southeastern edge of Death Valley National Park and cuts through the mountains at Ibex Pass as it is entering Inyo County.

After passing by the turnoff for Tecopa Hot Springs, SR 127 runs concurrently with SR 178 through the community of Shoshone. SR 127 continues along the eastern edge of Death Valley National Park, passing by Eagle Mountain and the Amargosa River before intersecting SR 190 at Death Valley Junction. The road ends at the California-Nevada border, where Nevada State Route 373 begins. It is the "Lost Highway" featured in David Lynch's film Lost Highway.

SR 127 is part of the California Freeway and Expressway System, and near I-15 is part of the National Highway System, a network of highways that are considered essential to the country's economy, defense, and mobility by the Federal Highway Administration. SR 127 is eligible to be included in the State Scenic Highway System, but it is not officially designated as a scenic highway by the California Department of Transportation.

== History ==
In 1933, Route 127 was added to the state highway system, and went from Baker to Death Valley Junction; Route 128 went from there to the Nevada state line. In the 1964 state highway renumbering, SR 127 was defined from I-15 to the Nevada state line. The route has remained the same since its definition.

== Major intersections ==
Except where prefixed with a letter, postmiles were measured on the road as it was in 1964, based on the alignment that existed at the time, and do not necessarily reflect current mileage. Postmile prefixes include: R reflecting a realignment in the route since then, M indicating a second realignment, L referring to an overlap due to a correction or change, and T indicating postmiles classified as temporary. Segments that remain unconstructed or have been relinquished to local control may be omitted. The numbers reset at county lines; the start and end postmiles in each county are given in the county column.

County	Location	Postmile	Destinations	Notes
San Bernardino; SBD L0.00-41.47	Baker	L0.00	Kelbaker Road	Continuation beyond I-15
San Bernardino; SBD L0.00-41.47	Baker	L0.00	I-15 (Mojave Freeway) – Las Vegas, Barstow	Interchange; south end of SR 127; I-15 exit 246
San Bernardino; SBD L0.00-41.47	Baker	0.00	Baker Boulevard (I-15 Bus.) – Las Vegas, Barstow	Former US 91 / US 466
San Bernardino–Inyo county line		41.47 0.00	Ibex Pass, elevation 2,072 feet (632 m)	
Inyo; INY 0.00-49.42		6.51	Old Spanish Trail Highway – Tecopa, Hot Springs	
Inyo; INY 0.00-49.42	Shoshone	14.75	SR 178 east – Pahrump, Las Vegas	South end of SR 178 overlap
Inyo; INY 0.00-49.42		16.25	SR 178 west – Badwater	North end of SR 178 overlap
Inyo; INY 0.00-49.42	Death Valley Junction	42.15	SR 190 – Death Valley National Park	Eastern terminus of SR 190
Inyo; INY 0.00-49.42		49.42	SR 373 to US 95 – Amargosa Valley, Las Vegas	Continuation beyond the Nevada state line; north end of SR 127
1.000 mi = 1.609 km; 1.000 km = 0.621 mi: Concurrency terminus
