= Death Valley Junction, California =

Unincorporated community in California, United States

Death Valley Junction
- Unincorporated community
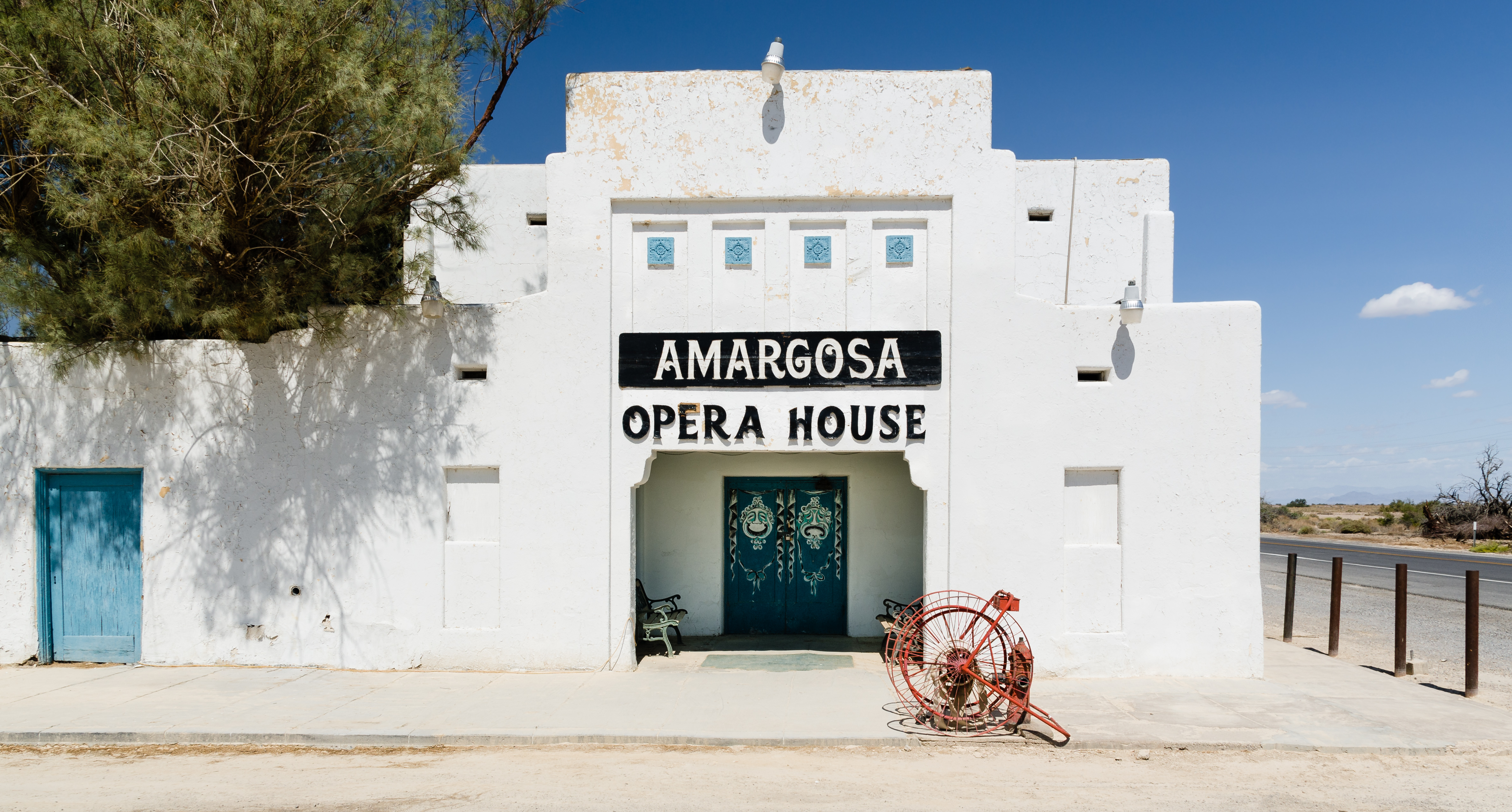
- Amargosa Opera House

- Location in California
- Coordinates: 36°18′08″N 116°24′49″W
- Country: United States
- State: California
- County: Inyo
- Elevation: 2,041 ft (622 m)
- FIPS code: 06-18212
- GNIS feature ID: 1656477
- Death Valley Junction Historic District
- U.S. National Register of Historic Places
- U.S. Historic district
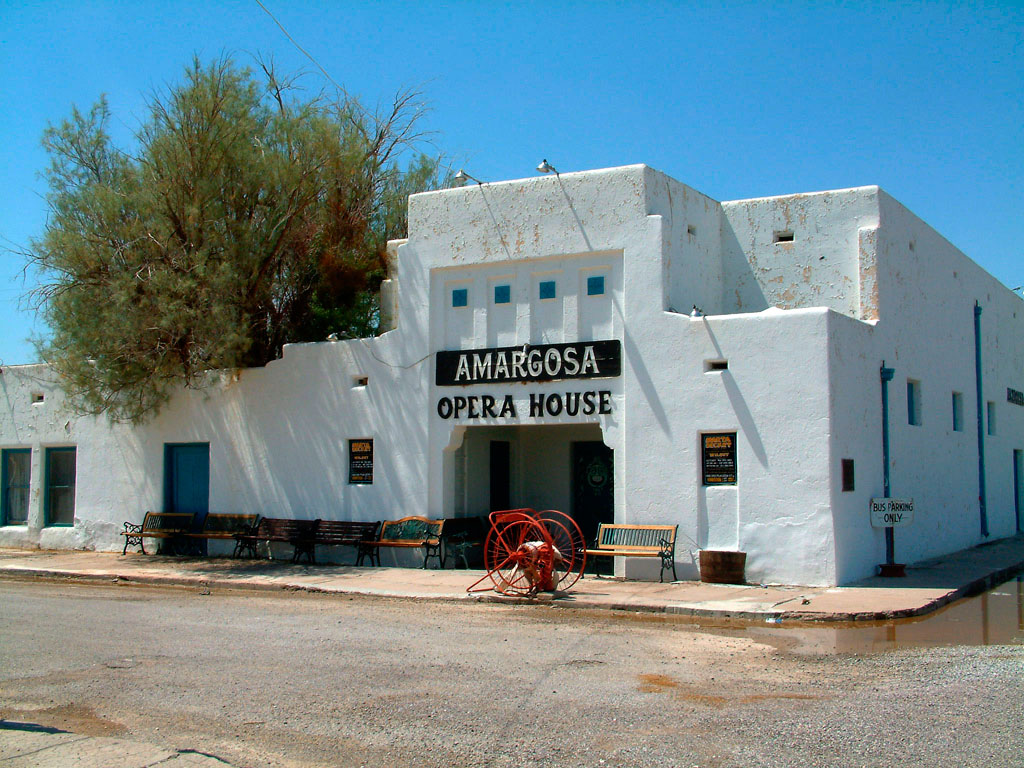
- Amargosa Opera House

- Location within California Location within the United States
- Location: CA 127 and CA 190, Death Valley Junction, California
- Built: 1923
- Architect: Alexander H. McCulloch
- Architectural style: Mission/Spanish Revival
- NRHP reference No.: 80000802
- Added to NRHP: December 10, 1980

Death Valley Junction is a tiny unincorporated community in Inyo County, California, United States in the Amargosa Valley, which is in Mojave Desert. Located at the intersection of SR 190 and SR 127, it is just east of Death Valley National Park. The zip code is 92328, the elevation is 2,000 ft (610 m), and the population is fewer than four people.

Death Valley Junction is home to the Amargosa Opera House and Hotel, where resident Marta Becket staged dance and mime shows from the late 1960s until her last show in February 2012. Becket died in 2017. The hotel is still operating next to the opera house, but beyond these maintained areas, the town is in a state of disrepair. There is no gas station, and the town is owned by the non-profit Amargosa Opera House Inc. which runs the Opera House and Hotel.

The community's location, 27 miles (43 km) east-southeast of Furnace Creek, on the east side of Death Valley in the Amargosa Valley and near Ash Meadows National Wildlife Refuge. To the east-southeast, 27 miles away, is Pahrump, Nevada. South on SR127 is the town of Shoshone. The closest straight-line distance to the Nevada state line is roughly five miles northeast.

== History ==
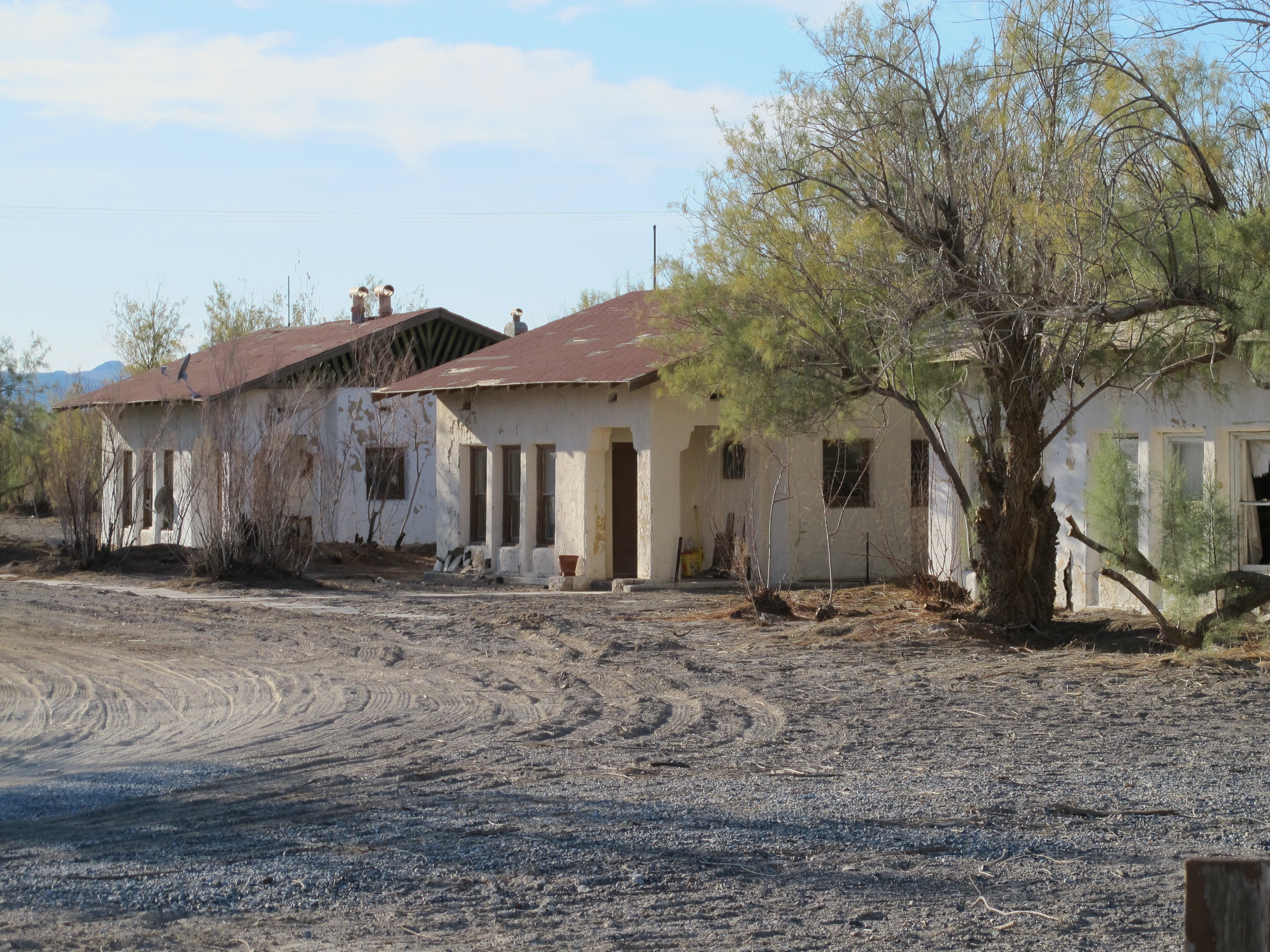
Abandoned buildings in the historic district

The town was created in 1907 when the Tonopah and Tidewater Railroad was constructed through the Amargosa Valley and a spur from their main line was built to the Lila C. borax mine in the hills to the west. The town was originally owned by Robert Tubb, who operated a saloon, store, and brothel. The town first appears on the 1910 Furnace Creek Quandrangle USGS topographic map.

In 1914, the Death Valley Railroad started operating between Ryan, California and Death Valley Junction to carry borax. When it was established, it used 3.19 miles (5.13 km) of tracks belonging to the Tonopah and Tidewater Railroad east-southeast of Death Valley Junction to Horton.

From 1923 to 1925 the Pacific Coast Borax Company constructed buildings in the town, hiring architect Alexander Hamilton McCulloch to design a Spanish Colonial Revival whistle stop centered at the hotel, theater and office complex building, now known as the Amargosa Opera House and Hotel.

The railroad's operations ceased in 1928. The town began to decline in the mid-20th century.

In 1967 dancer and actress Marta Becket visited due to an automobile repair. She became enamored with the theater, and with help from benefactors, she leased, then purchased, the hotel and theater complex. In 1980 the town was included in the National Register of Historic Places as the "Death Valley Junction Historic District."

Government documents show an effort by the Timbisha Shoshone tribal government to acquire about 7,200 acres (29 km^{2}) in the area during 1999 to 2000. This includes areas for residences and the official federal sanction to use some government lands for traditional ceremonies. In 2017 the tribe constructed a cannabis grow facility on the land.

=== Postal and telephone history ===
The Death Valley post office opened in 1908 and transferred to Furnace Creek Ranch in 1961. The Amargosa post office opened in 1962, changed its name to Death Valley Junction in 1968. (Note: While the post office designation may have been called Amargosa for a time, the town has always been referred to as Death Valley Junction going back to 1907 in maps, newspaper articles, and official documents.)

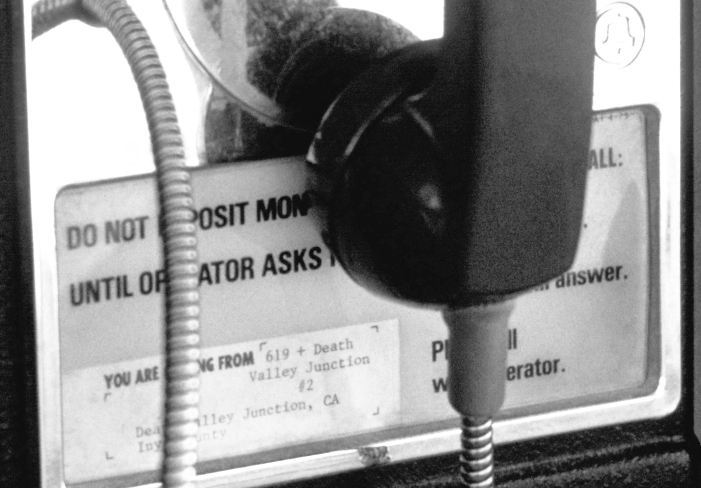
The bottom instruction card of Death Valley Junction #2, a non-dial Western Electric 1A1 coin collector located at the Amagosa Opera House. Number detail on instruction card says, "619+Death Valley Junction #2." (Photo was taken in the late 1970s.)

Local wired telephones were manual telephone service until the 1980s. To reach a phone in Death Valley Junction when the area was under manual service required dialing the operator and asking for "Death Valley Junction, California, Toll Station" (and the one-digit number). Placing an outbound call required lifting the receiver and waiting for an operator. The operator who answered was in Los Angeles (over 150 miles away). Death Valley Junction is now in area codes 442 and 760.

== Politics ==
In the state legislature, Death Valley Junction is in the 8th senatorial district, represented by Democrat Angelique Ashby, and the 26th Assembly district, represented by Democrat Patrick Ahrens.

Federally, Death Valley Junction is in California's 8th congressional district, represented by Democrat John Garamendi.

== Notable people ==
- "Shotgun" Kitty Tubb – wife of the original owner of the town, Robert Tubb
- Marta Becket – actress, dancer, choreographer and painter
- Harry Rosenberg – engineer who was instrumental in creating useful alloys of titanium
