= Baker Airport =

- IATA: none; ICAO: none; FAA LID: 0O2

Summary
- Airport type: Public
- Owner: U.S. Dept. of Interior-BLM
- Operator: San Bernardino County, Department of Airports
- Serves: Baker, California
- Elevation AMSL: 922 ft (281 m)
- Coordinates: 35°17′11″N 116°04′54″W
- Website: airports.sbcounty.gov/baker-airport/
- Interactive map of Baker Airport

Runways
Direction	Length		Surface
Direction	ft	m	Surface
15/33	3,157	962	Asphalt

Statistics (2006)
- Aircraft operations: 500
- Source: Federal Aviation Administration

Baker Airport (FAA LID: 0O2) is a public airport located two miles (3 km) northwest of the central business district of Baker, in San Bernardino County, California, United States. It is owned by the U.S. Department of the Interior, Bureau of Land Management.

== Facilities and aircraft ==
Baker Airport covers an area of 240 acres (97 ha) and has one runway designated 15/33 with a 3,157 by 50 feet (962 by 15 m) asphalt surface. For the 12-month period ending February 16, 2006, the airport had 500 general aviation aircraft operations, an average of 42 per month.
