= Amargosa Valley, Nevada =

Unincorporated community in Nevada, US

Amargosa Valley
- Unincorporated town
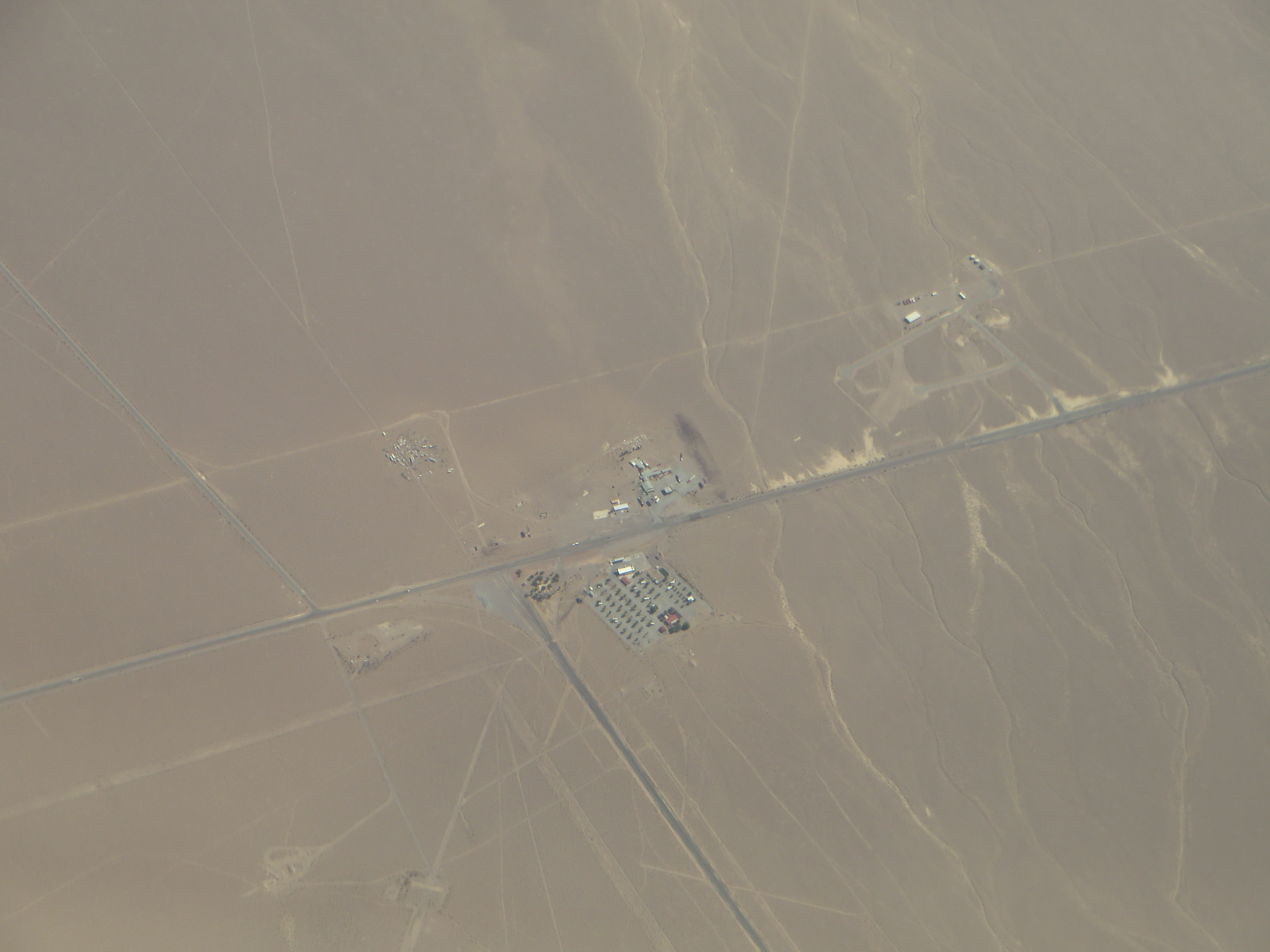
- Aerial view
- Nickname: Valley of Faith
- Motto: The Jewel of Nye County
- Location in Nevada Amargosa Valley (the United States)
- Coordinates: 36°38′38″N 116°24′01″W
- Country: United States
- State: Nevada
- County: Nye
- Founded: 1905; 121 years ago
- Named for: Amargosa River

Area
  - Total: 98.66 sq mi (255.53 km^{2})
  - Land: 98.66 sq mi (255.53 km^{2})
  - Water: 0.0039 sq mi (0.01 km^{2})
- Elevation: 2,664 ft (812 m)

Population (2023)
  - Total: 1,408
  - Density: 10.8/sq mi (4.16/km^{2})
- Time zone: UTC−8 (PST)
  - Summer (DST): UTC−7 (PDT)
- ZIP code: 89020
- Area code: 775
- FIPS code: 32-01000
- GNIS feature ID: 858057
- Coordinates and elevation from United States Geological Survey

Amargosa Valley (formerly Lathrop Wells) is an unincorporated town located on U.S. Route 95 in Nye County, in the U.S. state of Nevada.

== Description ==
The community is named after the Amargosa River which flows through the valley from its origination in Nevada to its terminus in Death Valley, California. Like most desert rivers, the 200-mile (320 km) long Amargosa flows on the surface only when rare rainfalls flood the desert washes, except for a 20-mile (32 km) segment near Shoshone, California, where the river flows perennially. The name Amargosa Valley is used locally with reference to the actual geographic valley, although for the most part, it is coincident with the Amargosa Desert and is noted as such on many maps.

The populated area of the Amargosa Valley is sandwiched between US 95 to the north and the California border to the south. Some of the residential streets in the community cross over into California. Much of the Nevada-California border in this area is contiguous with the boundaries of Death Valley National Park. The national park boundary extends into Nevada near Beatty, approximately 30 mi (48 km) northwest of Amargosa Valley. Amargosa Valley is located approximately 88 mi (142 km) northwest of Las Vegas, 35 mi (56 km) northwest of Pahrump, and 24 mi (39 km) north of Death Valley Junction, California.

== History ==
The Tonopah and Tidewater Railroad ran through the valley from 1906 to 1940, for borax mining operations. Modern development did not begin until the early 1950s. Electric power, other than that produced by private generators, was not available until 1963. Until the early 1990s growth in Amargosa Valley was minimal. More recently, intense growth in Las Vegas has led many new residents to settle in Amargosa Valley and nearby Pahrump.

== Geography ==
Amargosa Valley is located at 36.58001 North, 116.44487 West at an elevation of 2,640 feet (805 m) above sea level. The landscape is typical of lower to moderate elevations in the Mojave Desert, with flat expanses of sandy soil punctuated by rocky mounds and hills. Predominant indigenous vegetation is White Bursage and Creosote Bush, with some Joshua Trees and Cacti at higher elevations. Numerous non-native plant species have also been introduced.

== Demographics ==
Historical population
Census	Pop.	Note	%±
2010	1,456		—
2020	1,408		−3.3%
U.S. Decennial Census

According to the 2023 American Community Survey, the median age of residents in Amargosa Valley was 34.5, with 33% under 18, 45% from 18 to 64, and 22% at 65 and over. The population was 55% female and 45% female, with 48% white, 34% Hispanic, and 16% belonging to two or more races. 12.9% of the population were foreign-born from Latin America, and 17.3% were veterans.

The median household income was $55,573, with the per capita income $24,497. 30.7% of persons were living below the poverty line. There were 440 households with 3.2 persons per household. 46% of households were married couples, 25% were non-family, 27% were female householders and 2% were male householders. 43% of the population ages 15 and over were married, and 57% were single.

Within the city limits of Amargosa Valley, there were 490 housing units, with 90% occupancy. 76% were mobile homes, 15% were single unit houses, and 9% were boats, RVs, vans, etc.

Education-wise, 88.2% of Amargosa Valley residents were high school graduates, and 23% held a Bachelor's degree or higher. 8% had post-graduate education.

== Recreation ==
Alien Cathouse is one of Nevada's legal brothels. It is located near the corner of U.S. 95 and SR 373. Longstreet Hotel, Casino, and RV Resort is a full-service hotel and casino with restaurants and a RV park. The hotel is located on SR 373, near the Nevada–California border. The hotel is popular with visitors to nearby Death Valley National Park. Big Dunes, popular for weekenders from all over Southern Nevada, is located on the north side of Amargosa Valley. Ash Meadows Wildlife Refuge is located in the southern end of Amargosa Valley.

== Attractions ==
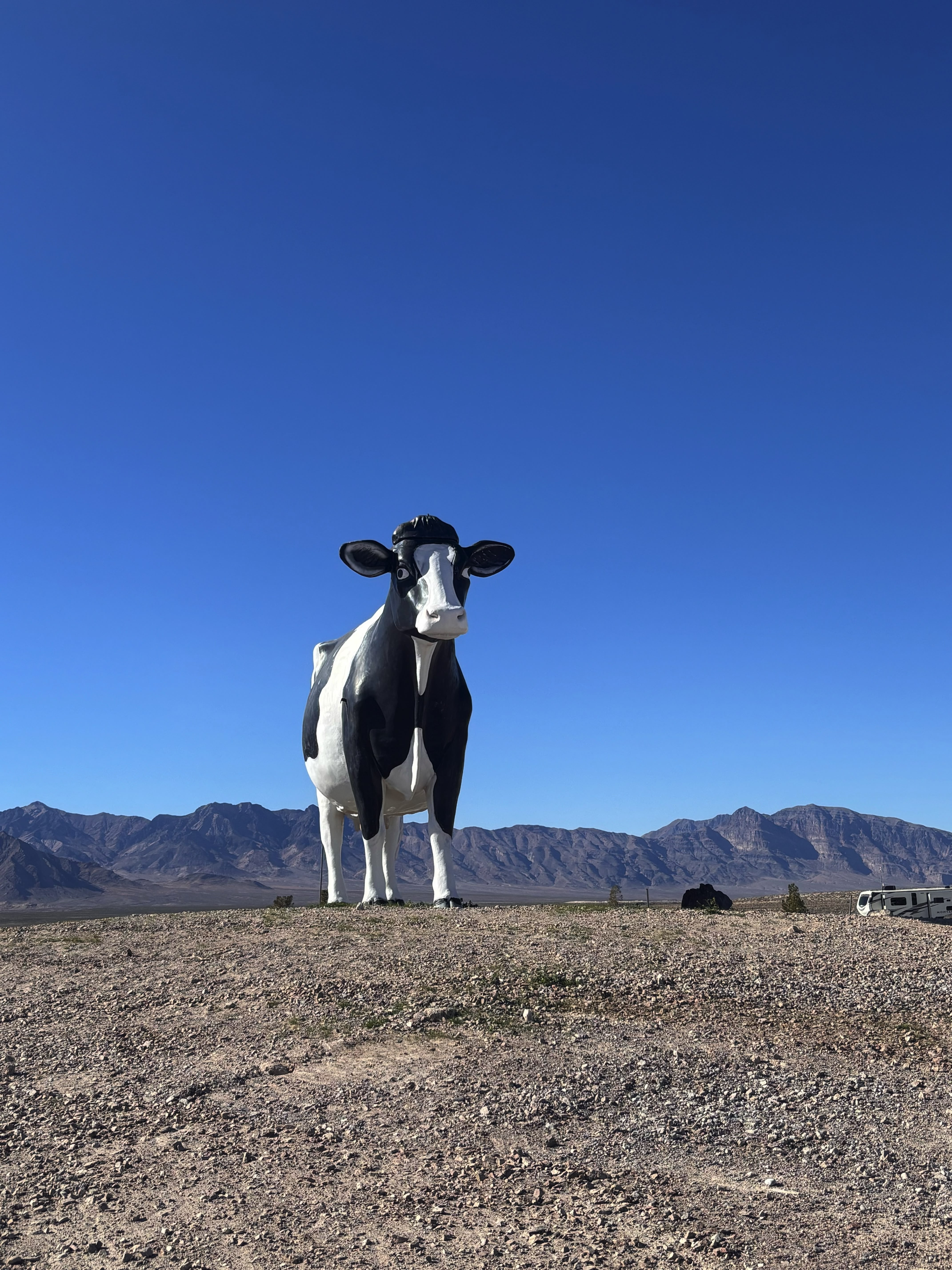
The Big Bovine of the Desert statue (2026).

There are several attractions within the boundaries of Amargosa Valley. The Big Bovine of the Desert statue, a 12 ft (3.7 m)-tall and 15 ft (4.6 m)-wide dairy cow, stands on SR 373 near the Longstreet Hotel Casino & RV Resort. Across the street is the El Toro Statue, a large bull made of patchwork metal.
