= Raffetto =

Raffetto may refer to:

== People ==
- Bertha Raffetto (1885-1952), American singer
- Isadeen Raffetto (1910-1987), wife of Alexander Howison Murray Jr.
- John Augustus Raffetto (1864-1954), American hotelier
- John Augustus Raffetto Jr. (1908-1977), American banker
- Lloyd Raffetto (1897-1988), American banker
- Michael Raffetto (1899-1990), American radio star
