= Swift Berry =

American forestry expert (1887 – 1967)

Member of the California Senate from the 9th district
- In office January 5, 1953 - January 2, 1961
- Preceded by: Harley E. Dillinger
- Succeeded by: John C. Begovich

Personal details
- Born: Jack Swift Berry; January 9, 1887 Tecumseh, Nebraska, U.S.
- Died: June 27, 1967 (aged 80) Placerville, California, U.S.
- Party: Republican
- Spouse(s): Cecile Ball (1), Florence B. Berry (2)
- Children: 3
- Education: Biltmore Forest School
- Occupation: Forestry
- Profession: Politician

Military service
- Branch/service: United States Army
- Battles/wars: World War I

Jack Swift Berry (January 9, 1887 – June 27, 1967) was a forestry expert and lumberman and then two-term member of the California State Legislature from the Republican Party.

== Background ==
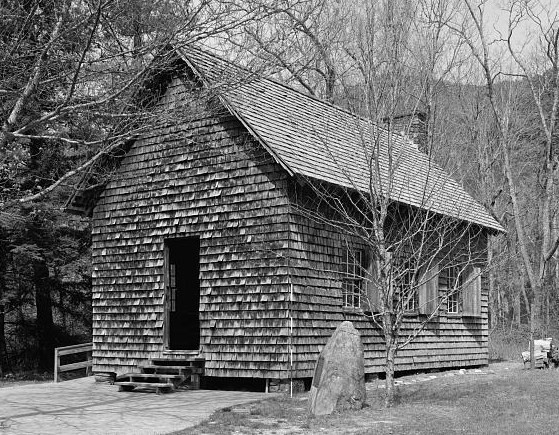
Berry studied at the still-new Biltmore Forest School in 1906-1907

Jack Swift Berry was born on January 9, 1887, in Tecumseh, Nebraska. Both his parents died young, so a grandmother raised Berry and his brother. In 1903, Berry worked as a logger in Black Hills, South Dakota. In 1906, he studied at the Biltmore Forest School in North Carolina; in 1907, he obtained a degree as Forester.

== Career ==
=== Forestry ===
By 1908, Berry was working in District 5 (now R5 on this map) of the still-new United States Forestry Service.

In July 1907, he entered the United States Forestry Service in Washington, DC, as a forest assistant. In 1908, he was transferred successively to: Holy Cross National Forest in Glenwood, Colorado, Arapaho National Forest in Sulphur Springs, Colorado, and the newly created District 5, headquartered in San Francisco, California, where he worked in timber sales. He earned an advance degree from the Biltmore Forest School, in part due to a thesis on logging and lumber flumes in California. In 1912, he became Forest Examiner and in 1916 became Logging Engineer District 5 (in charge of stumpage for all California forests).

=== World War I ===
In 1917, Berry joined the US Army Corps of Engineers and served in World War I. He served as a major in an advance party of the Tenth Engineers, Forestry Department, for the American Expeditionary Forces including time in Bordeaux and Paris (1917-1919).

=== Forestry ===
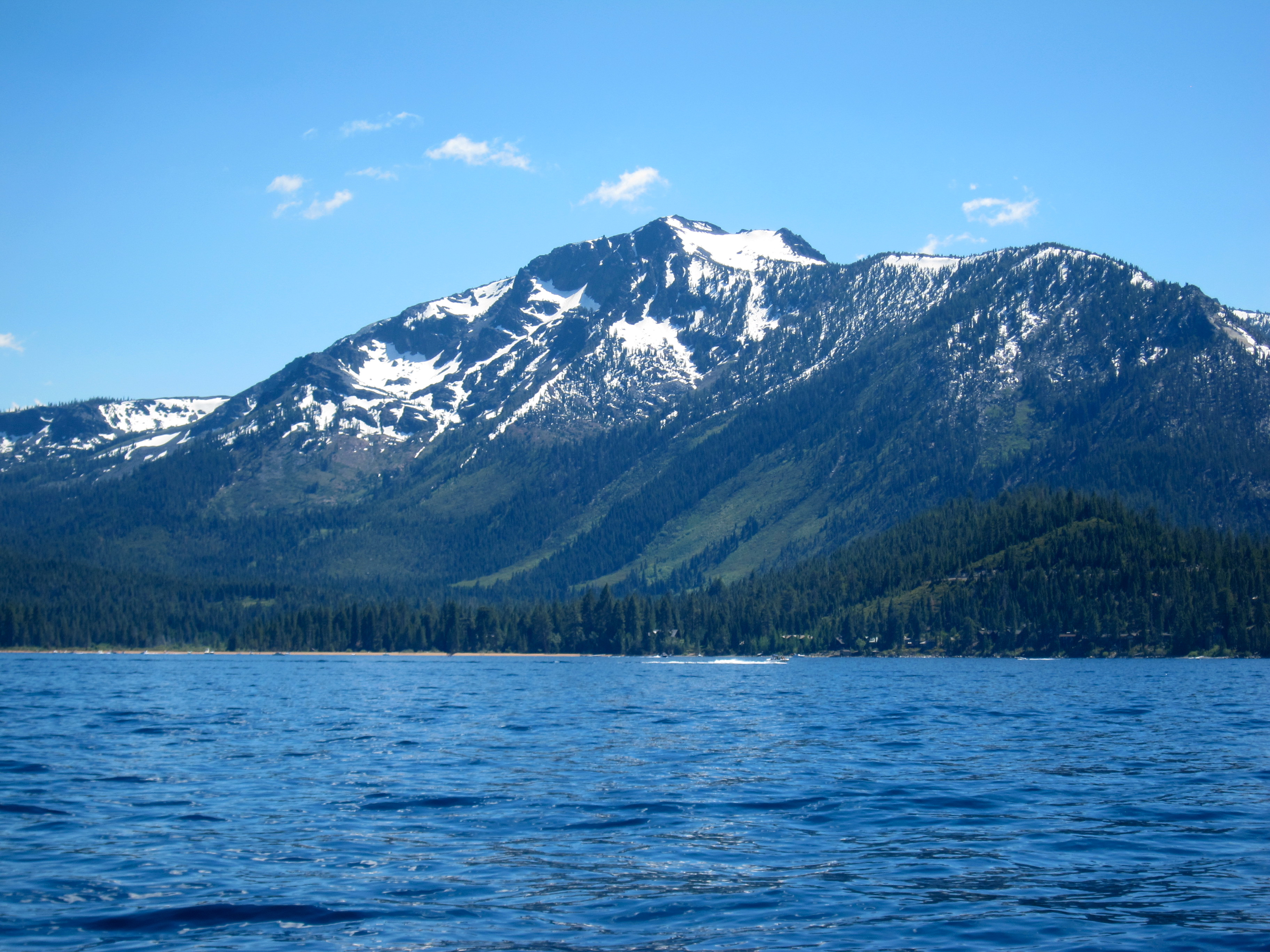
Mount Tallac near Lake Tahoe, now lying within the Desolation Wilderness of Eldorado National Forest in El Dorado County–timberland Berry once oversaw

In September 1919, he became a forest (timber) valuation engineer for the California pine and redwood region at the United States Bureau of Internal Revenue, based in San Francisco. In 1921, he worked as a forest engineer for a small company. In 1923, he served as secretary of the California Forest Protective Association. His 1921 study in forestry received recognition from the California State Board of Forestry in 1923.

=== Lumber ===
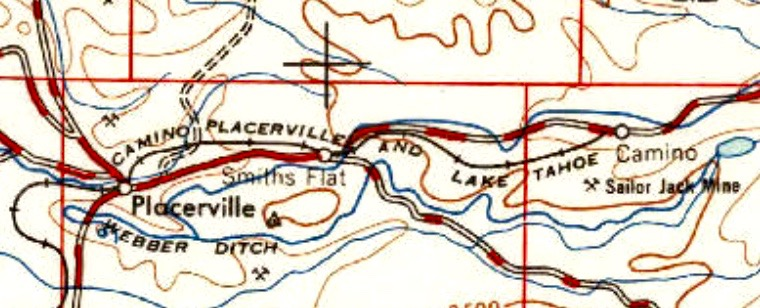
Route of the Camino, Placerville and Lake Tahoe Railroad (1947), owned by the Michigan-California Lumber Company, of which Berry was general manager

In 1924, Berry served as general manager of the Michigan-California Lumber Company ("Michigan Cal") through 1949. (The Michigan-California Lumber Company owned the Camino, Placerville and Lake Tahoe Railroad (CPLT) railroad. The CPLT railroad was dismantled beginning in October 1949, with lumber hauled by trucks over a route almost twice as long as the railroad and cable system.) Berry applied the Biltmore method of sustainable forestry for 90,000 acres of timber. Originally, he worked in Camino, California. In 1930, he became general manager. In 1933, he had Michigan Cal donate the 4,400-acre Blodgett Forest (near Georgetown, California) to the University of California as a laboratory for its forestry school. In 1942, he helped establish the Amador-El Dorado Forest Forum. In 1950, he formed the Jack Swift Berry Lumber Company in Sacramento, California.

=== World War II ===
During World War II, Berry served as a lumber consultant to the National Production Authority.

=== California State Senate ===
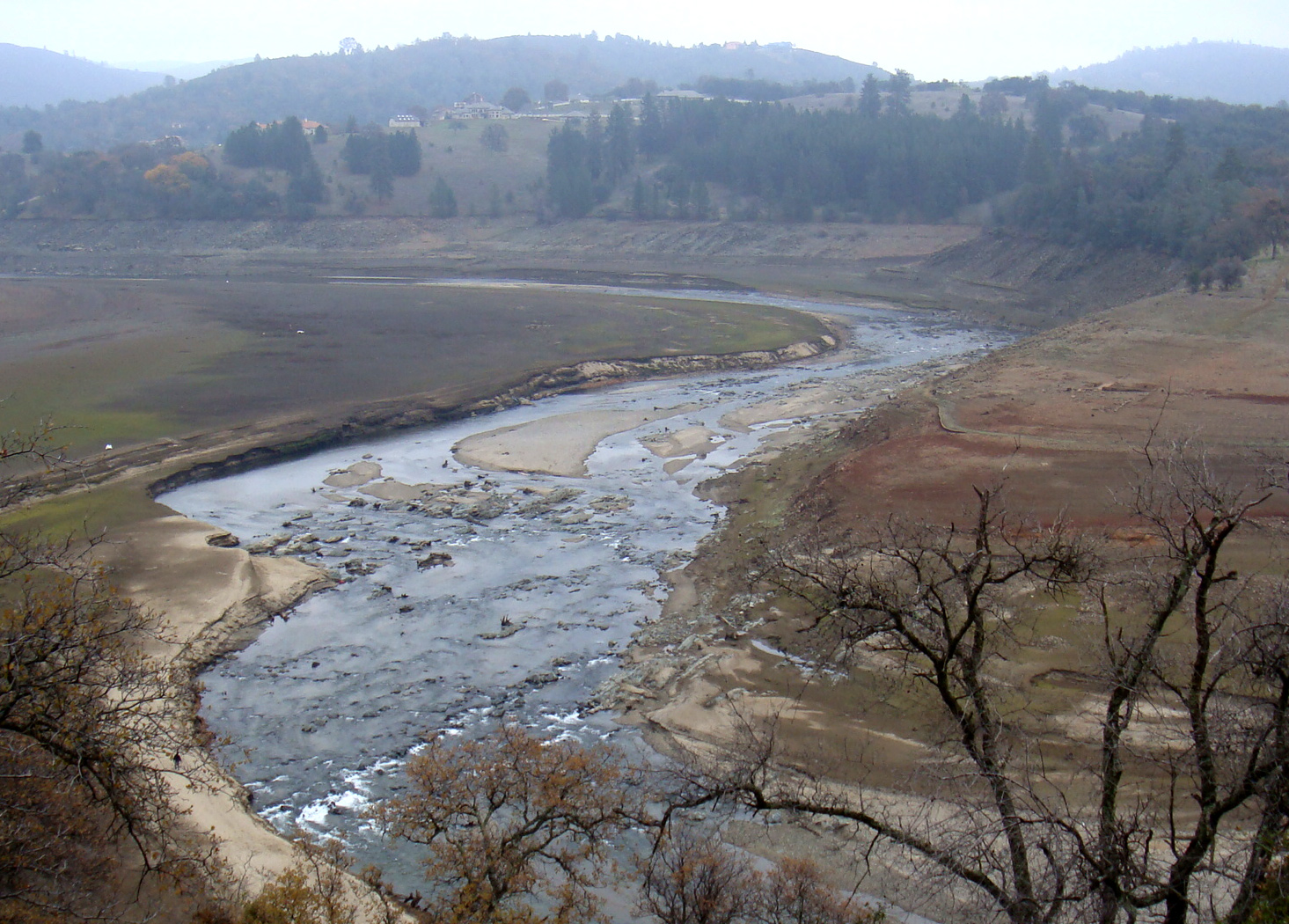
South Fork American River running through El Dorado hills, which formed part of Berry's senate district

In 1952, Berry started service as State Senator from the then 9th District comprising El Dorado and Amador counties through 1960. He served as chairman of the Natural Resources Committee. With Placerville mayor Sandy Murray, he championed the building of U.S. Route 50 in California (US 50) and the Marshall Hospital in Placerville. On November 4, 1952, Berry won a seat as both Republican and Democratic party candidate. On November 6, 1956, he won again. On November 8, 1960, he lost and did not run again. During his first term, Berry went to the hospital to recover from a serious illness: the California State Senate passed Senate Resolution No. 17 of 1952 to "wish him a speedy and complete recovery." During his second term in 1957, he opposed a $157,000 "feasibility study" on the Stumpy Meadows reservoir and thus against an $85 million project on the Upper American River by the Sacramento Municipal Utility District (SMUD).

=== Banking ===
In 1953, Berry became the first president of the newly formed Mother Lode Bank of Placerville (1953-1975), whose co-founders included Lloyd Raffetto. He remained president through 1962 when, due to a stroke, he retired.

== Personal life and death ==
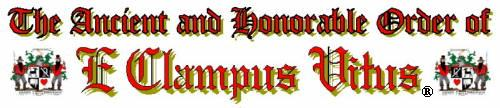
Berry was long-time member of E Clampus Vitus and 5th Humbug of James Marshall Chapter 49 in 1953

In 1912, Berry married Cecile Ball. They had three children named Jack, William, and Betty Lou. By 1930, they had divorced. Later, Berry married Florence B. Berry.

Berry served as president of the Western Pine Association of Portland, Oregon, from 1939 through 1940 and of the Pacific division of the National Association of Wooden Box Shook Makers (1947-1949).

Berry was a long-time member of E Clampus Vitus and the California State Board of Forestry (part of the California Department of Forestry and Fire Protection).

Swift Berry died age 80 on June 27, 1967, in Placerville. The California State Senate passed Senate Resolution No. 315 of 1967 to commemorate the life and service of J. Swift Berry.

Grandson Phil Berry was a trust lawyer in Placerville.

== Awards and legacy ==
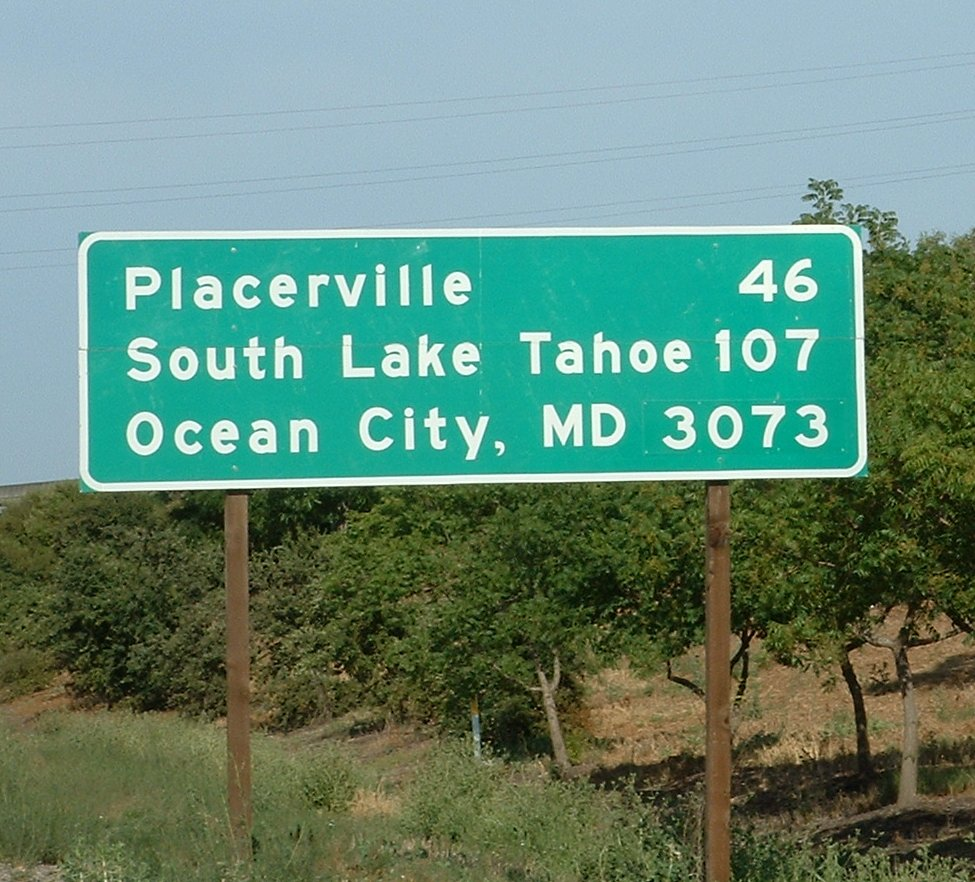
Sign at west end of US 50 with distances to Placerville, South Lake Tahoe, all the way to Ocean City, Maryland–Berry supported US Route 50's development near Placerville

- 1962: Plaque to "Swift Berry: 'Mr. Clamper'... 'A Man to Match Our Mountains'" by E Clampus Vitus in Berry Park, Placerville
- Bell of Shay Locomotive Number 8, presented to Berry, now donated to the Sierra Nevada Logging Museum and located at "Eight Spot"

== Works ==
As the Division of Forestry of the California Department of Natural Resources noted, "Throughout his career, Swift Berry wrote numerous articles and bulletins on forest utilization."

- Shake-Making and Tray Mills in California National Forests (1913)
- Lumbering in the Sugar and Yellow Pine Region of California (1917)
- "Michigan-California Lumber Company" (1957)

== See also ==
- Members of the California State Legislature
- Michigan-California Lumber Company
- Camino, Placerville and Lake Tahoe Railroad (CPLT) railroad
- List of California railroads
- List of company towns in the United States
- Alexander Howison Murray Jr.
- Lloyd Raffetto
