= Travel Town Museum =

Californian railway museum (opened 1952)

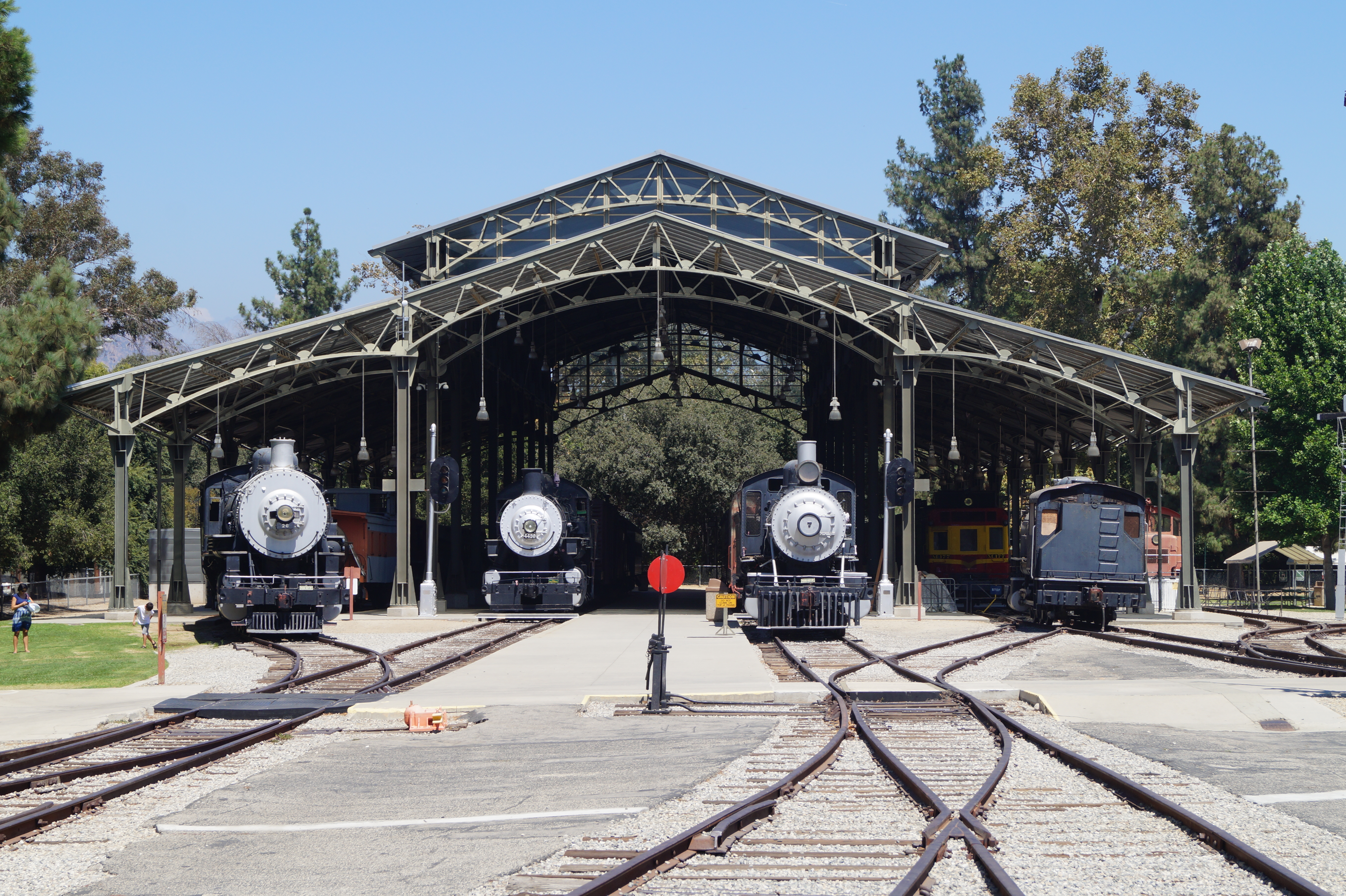
- Main shed
- Established: December 14, 1952
- Location: 5200 Zoo Drive; Los Angeles, California 90027; United States
- Coordinates: 34°9′16″N 118°18′27″W
- Founder: Charley Atkins
- Owners: Los Angeles Department of Recreation & Parks
- Website: www.traveltown.org

Travel Town Museum is a railway museum dedicated on December 14, 1952, and located in the northwest corner of Los Angeles, California's Griffith Park. The history of railroad transportation in the western United States from 1880 to the 1930s is the primary focus of the museum's collection, with an emphasis on railroading in Southern California and the Los Angeles area.

== History ==
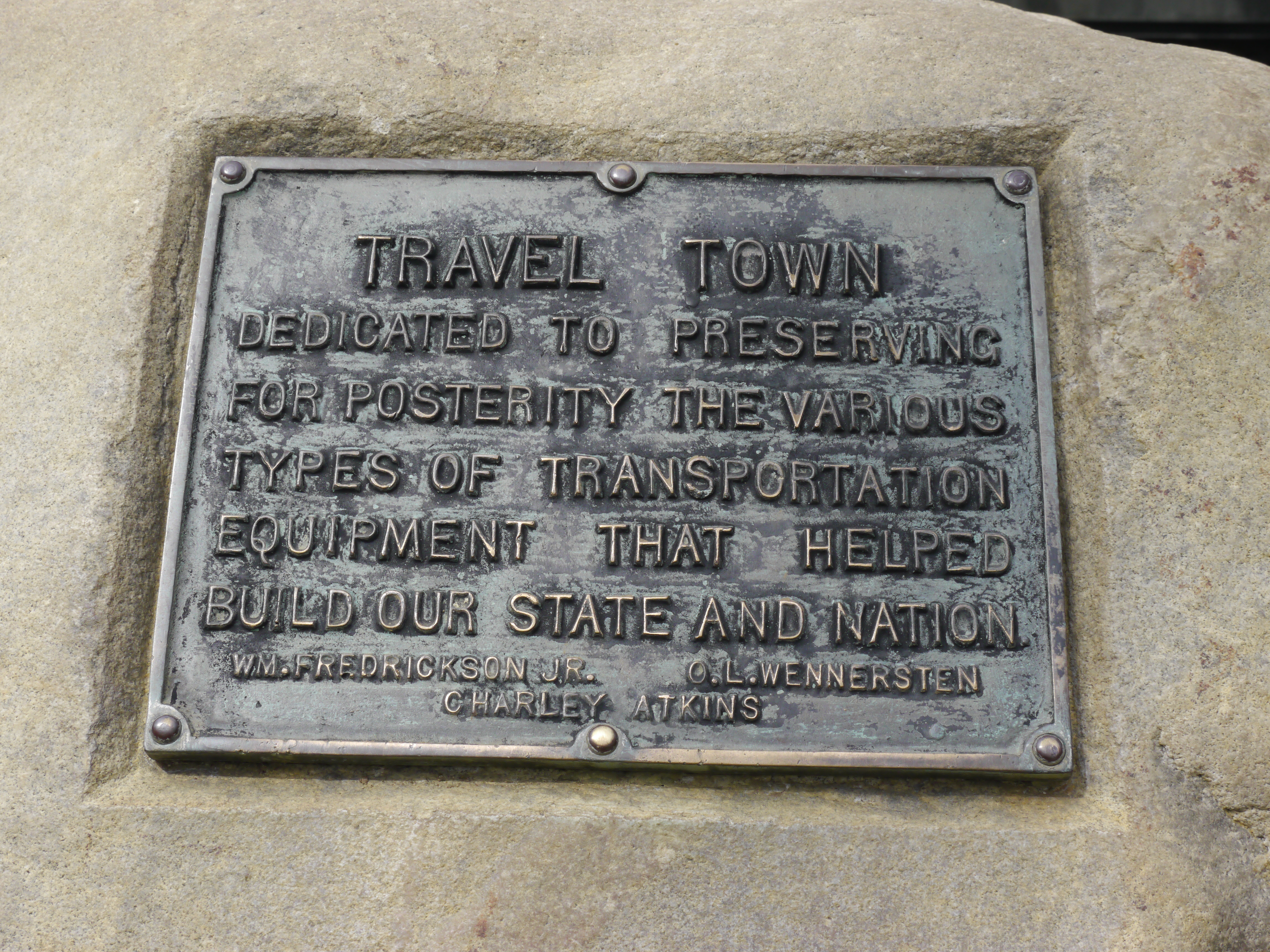
Plaque commemorating the founders

In the late 1940s, Charley Atkins, a Recreation and Parks employee, and some rail enthusiasts came up with the plan that a full-size steam locomotive would be an attractive addition to the miniature railroad ride at Griffith Park. The City of Los Angeles Harbor Department had two small locomotives destined for scrap that seemed to be suitable for this purpose. These locomotives had worked at a quarry on Santa Catalina Island, California, carrying stone to be used building breakwaters for the Port of Los Angeles. With the support of former Recreation and Parks Department General Manager George Hjelte and Superintendent of Recreation William Frederickson, Atkins initiated contacts with major railroads in California to ask what equipment they could donate. At that time, the steam locomotive era was drawing to a close, and Atkins found a good response. The earliest locomotives were made accessible for children to climb on them. Travel Town was inaugurated on December 14, 1952, in an area used as an internment camp during World War II. The locomotives were accessible day and night until fencing was installed in 1955 to prevent vandals from breaking glass windows and gauges. A Union Pacific Railroad dining car donated in 1954 was available for birthday parties. The park's 3 ft (914 mm) narrow gauge Crystal Springs & Southwestern Railroad operated two locomotives from Oahu on 0.62 miles (1 km) of track beginning in 1955, but these locomotives were later returned to Hawaii for display. In 1965, Travel Town's exhibits were regrouped and the park was rededicated.

== Railway collection ==
The railroad museum portion contains 43 full-scale railroad engines, cars and other rolling stock.

== Exhibits ==
Number	Model	Build Date	Photo	Original Operator	Gauge	Notes
#1369	3-truck Heisler	1918		HHRR	4 ft 8 1/2 in (1,435 mm)	The Heisler locomotive was used for hauling timber from the forest to the mill in the Mother Lode country. It was built by the Heisler Locomotive Works in 1918 and was the 369th locomotive built by them, so it was assigned shop number 1369. Heisler built a total of over 600 locomotives in various sizes. This geared locomotive weights 75 tons and all 12 wheels on the three trucks are driving wheels. The large parts that protrude diagonally from the sides of the locomotive just in front of the cab are the pistons. The pistons operate a crank shaft which rotates two drive shafts that turn all 12 wheels. The locomotive was originally built for the Hetch Hetchy Railroad to haul material for building the dam that supplies drinking water to San Francisco. In the mid 1920s the locomotive was sold to the Standard Lumber Company of Sonora, California, which later became the Pickering Lumber Company. The locomotive stayed there until it was donated to Travel Town in 1952. It was donated by Pickering Lumber Co. in Standard, California, while F.F. Momyer was their president. Its initial restoration was done as an Eagle Scout Service Project of Will Cosso and was completed on 25 June 2016 with the help of Arcadia Boy Scout Troop 111, Travel Town Volunteers, friend and family. Further restoration will continue.
#2	Class C Shay	1922		Little River Redwood Company	4 ft 8 1/2 in (1,435 mm)	The oil fired 3-truck Shay with 12 geared wheels was built in 1922 by Lima Locomotive Works (builder's number 3172) as #4 for the Little River Redwood Company railroad in Crannell, California. The locomotive was sold in 1935 to the Camino, Placerville & Lake Tahoe Railroad and renumbered #2. It was used on an eight-mile (13 km) long line owned by the Michigan-California Lumber Company. It was primarily a lumber-hauling line, carrying milled timber from the company's planing mill in Camino, California in the Sierra Nevada Mountains east of Sacramento, California to a connection with the Placerville Branch of the Southern Pacific at Placerville, California. It has a weight of 166,500 lb (75.5 t). The drivers are 36 in (910 mm) in diameter and the cylinders are 12 by 15 inches (300 by 380 mm). It operated at 200 psi (14 bar) boiler pressure and delivered a tractive effort of 30,350 lb (13.77 t).
#4439	Switcher	1918		UP	4 ft 8 1/2 in (1,435 mm)	The 0-6-0 switcher #4439 was one of 45 oil-fired S-5 class built for Union Pacific by Baldwin Locomotive Works in 1918. It was used in Cheyenne, Wyoming and later on the Los Angeles Harbor Belt line, until it was decommissioned due to an order of the Air Pollution Control Board in 1957. It was the last steam engine to work regularly in the Los Angeles region. It has a weight of 156,000 lb (71 t) and operated at 180 psi (12 bar) boiler pressure. It had a tractive effort of 24,680 lb (11.19 t). It has 51 in (1,300 mm) drivers and 21 by 26 inches (530 by 660 mm) cylinders. It was donated by UP to the museum in 1957.
#6636	Sleeping car Rose Bowl (previously Telegraph Hill)	1937		UP	4 ft 8 1/2 in (1,435 mm)	The 18-roomette sleeping car #6635 of Union Pacific sleeping car was built in 1937 by the Pullman Company and derailed in the night of 12 August 1939 during the 1939 City of San Francisco derailment, when the streamliner train City of San Francisco was approaching a bridge in Nevada at nearly 90 mph (140 km/h). Five passenger cars plunged into the river below the bridge, and three more down an embankment. Of the 13 cars in the train, all with fanciful names taken from San Francisco landmarks such as Nob Hill and Fisherman's Wharf five cars stayed on their wheels, including this all-roomette sleeping car originally named Telegraph Hill. On that night, 24 people died and 121 were injured. This car was renamed Rose Bowl after repairs and was then placed on the City of Los Angeles train. It is the original Telegraph Hill, a survivor of what stands as one of the most famous unsolved train accidents. Although found to be sabotage in a railroad hearing, no saboteurs were identified, and track conditions have always been questioned. It had a weight of 20 tons, a length of 85 ft (26 m), and was traded in 1992 from the Railroads of Hawaii.
#LA-701	Pullmann Dormitory/Club Car Little Nugget	1937		UP	4 ft 8 1/2 in (1,435 mm)	The Union Pacific No. LA-701, Little Nugget is a 1937 Pullmann Dormitory/Club Car. It was built by the Pullman-Standard Car Manufacturing Company, as part of the Union Pacific and Chicago & North Western Railroads' new passenger train - the Streamliner City of Los Angeles. At the time, it represented the zenith in modern railcar design and technology. It was one of the most lavishly equipped railroad cars of all times, served as the club-lounge for the train's first class Pullman passengers.
#1544	Electra	1902		Pacific Electric	4 ft 8 1/2 in (1,435 mm)	Electric locomotive Electra built in 1902 in Sausalito by the North Shore Railroad. It was used during the cleanup after San Francisco's 1906 earthquake and fire. It was eventually purchased by the Pacific Electric and used as a work locomotive and switcher until 1952.
#1543	Electric car	1911		SP	4 ft 8 1/2 in (1,435 mm)	Electric car #1543 built in 1911 for the Southern Pacific's East Bay Electric Lines. The Interurban Electric Railway discontinued the service in 1941, but the United States Maritime Commission reassigned this car and similar ones to the Pacific Electric for wartime service. They were called blimps because of their size. Part of the car is in red IER and PE colors, but one side is in the green livery of the Los Angeles Metropolitan Transit Authority, which operated it after 1958.
	Wooden caboose	1881			4 ft 8 1/2 in (1,435 mm)	The wooden caboose was built in 1881. The transportation of this piece of equipment was donated to the children of Los Angeles by the Belyea Truck Company.
	Narrow gauge caboose	1900		OR&L	3 ft (914 mm)	Oahu Railway & Land Company No. 1, a 1900 OR&L built caboose.
#1	Coach			OR&L	3 ft (914 mm)	The wooden Oahu Railway & Land Company Coach # 1 is completely paneled in mahogany and originally had ornate detail-work painted on the ceiling. The original seats were most likely plain, wooden benches, since the car was used principally for carrying passengers on short trips between the towns of Hawaii. The exterior was originally decorated with detailed scroll painting. The car had an early-design water closet with a 15 in (380 mm) diameter hole cut into the floor board. Over the hole a funnel-shaped metal tube with a 10 in (250 mm) opening at the top was placed, with a round seat on it, also made from metal. The rolling stock from Hawaiian railroads at Travel Town was donated through the efforts of the local chapter of the Railway and Locomotive Historical Society, who made all the initial contacts in Hawaii in 1953. Beginning in 1955, the Oahu Railway and Land Company Locomotive #85 pulled Combination Car #36 and Coach #1 on excursion rides right on the tracks of Travel Town. The track paralleled the route along which the Ventura Freeway would be constructed 10 years later called the Crystal Springs & Southwestern Railway. The fares were 20 cents for adults, 10 cents for children. The operation was discontinued in 1961.
#36	Combination Car			OR&L	3 ft (914 mm)	A combination car carried passengers in one section and baggage, mail or both. It was commonly used on branch lines. Combination cars were usually on the head-end of a train with the baggage and mail section towards the locomotive tender, to prevent security problems of people passing through the baggage or mail area, if the wante to rach the seating area. Generally the seating in a combination car was second class, and was not as nicely furnished as a regular coach on the same train. Thus, it was often used as a smoking section and became often the exclusive domain of men, as women rarely smoked in public before World War II. In certain states combination cars served those passengers, who were not allowed to travel in the main cars due to the Jim Crow laws, by which segregation was implemented against people of color or those of lower socioeconomic classes. The car was built by the Oahu Railway & Land Shops. It had a weight of 11.5 tons and a length of 42 ft 10 in (13.06 m).
#1	American	1864		Western Pacific Railroad	4 ft 8 1/2 in (1,435 mm)	The 4-4-0 (American) locomotive was built by Norris Locomotive Works Lancaster plant in 1864 (builder's number 12) for the original Western Pacific Railroad. It was taken over by the Central Pacific Railroad in 1869, which used it until 1914, when it went to the short line of Stockton, Terminal and Eastern. ST&E operated it as Stockton Terminal and Eastern No. 1 until 1953. It was cosmetically restored in 2019 and now has a working hand-rung bell and air whistle.
#754	Haskell & Barker caboose	1910		WP	4 ft 8 1/2 in (1,435 mm)	Western Pacific No. 754, a 1910 Haskell & Barker caboose.
#670	Tank car	1911			4 ft 8 1/2 in (1,435 mm)	Richfield Oil No. 670, a 1911 tank car.
#26	Consolidation	1909		WP	4 ft 8 1/2 in (1,435 mm)	The 2-8-0 (Consolidation) type steam locomotive is builder's number 46456 of thirteen oil fired locomotives of this type built by Alco in 1909 to haul freight on the Western Pacific. It worked for 45 years on the Western Pacific and was one of the last Alco Consolidations in use at the railroad. It was donated by the Western Pacific to the "Children of Los Angeles" in 1954. It is classified as a C-43 and has a length of 69 ft 10 in (21.29 m). The engine weighs 203,000 lb (92 t) and the tender 157,000 lb (71 t). It has 20 by 30 inches (510 by 760 mm) cylinders and 57 inches (1,400 mm) drivers. With a 200 sq ft (19 m^{2}) firebox, a 33.6 sq ft (3.12 m^{2}) grate area and 2,292 sq ft (212.9 m^{2}) of heating surface (including 733 sq ft (68.1 m^{2}) superheating), it had a boiler pressure of 200 psi (14 bar), delivering 43,300 lb (19.6 t) tractive effort.
		1929		AT&SF	4 ft 8 1/2 in (1,435 mm)	Atchison, Topeka & Santa Fe No. M-177, a 1929 motorized passenger Railcar, incorporating an EMD engine into a Pullman carbody. It has been under a full restoration since 2003. It is operational as of 2020.
#664	Consolidation	1899		AT&SF	4 ft 8 1/2 in (1,435 mm)	The 2-8-0 (Consolidation) type steam locomotive was builter's number 17187 of 45 locomotives built by Baldwin Locomotive Works in 1899 for the Atchison, Topeka and Santa Fe Railway. The original number was #891, but it was renumbered #664 in 1900. In 1910, it was loaned to the Pecos & Northern Texas Railway for 12 months, but then returned to the AT&SF. It was used for freight trains on AT&SF's Northern, Southern, Panhandle, Plains and Gulf Divisions, and was still in active service, before it was donated to the museum in 1953. It has a weight of 161,500 lb (73.3 t). Its cylinders are 21 by 28 inches (530 by 710 mm), the drivers are 57 in (1,400 mm) and it is equipped with Stephenson valve gear. It has an oil burner with a firebox, 29 sq ft (2.7 m^{2}) grate and 1,790 sq ft (166 m^{2}) of heating surface, and operated at a boiler pressure of 180 psi (12 bar), delivering tractive effort of 33,100 lb (15.0 t). The 98,000 lb (44 t) tender held 9 tons of oil and 5,000 U.S. gal (19,000 L) of water.
#1	EMD diesel-electric switcher	1942		US Navy	4 ft 8 1/2 in (1,435 mm)	The 42-ton, 300 hp diesel-electric switcher #1 is one of three built by EMD in 1942 for the United States Navy. Eleven of these locomotives were built between 1940 and 1943. It hauled coal and supplies at the US Navy's Torpedo Station on Goat Island, Rhode Island as well as at the North Island Naval Air Station in San Diego, California. In 1962, it was moved to the McDonnell Douglas Naval Weapons Industrial Reserve Plant at Torrance, California, where it was used for additional 25 years. In March 1988, McDonnell Douglas donated it to the Travel Town Museum and was used there as a switcher. It got the name "Charley Atkins" after the founder of the museum. It is unusual that two diesel engines are used to drive the electric DC generator from both sides, one with clockwise rotation and the other anticlockwise.
#56	Baldwin RS-12	1955		McCloud River Railroad	4 ft 8 1/2 in (1,435 mm)	California Western Railroad #56, which was built by Baldwin in 1955 for the McCloud River Railroad. California Western operated it from 1970 until 1992. It was planned to be used for a proposed line from Travel Town to the Los Angeles Zoo, the Crystal Springs and Cahuenga Valley Railroad.
	Electric car	1890s				Four-wheeled electric car from Los Angeles built in the 1890s.
#21	San Francisco Municipal Railway	c.a. 1880		San Francisco cable car system	3 ft 6 in (1,067 mm)	This San Francisco cable car is an example of an early in-town passenger car, called a California car, with some interior space inside a compartment and other benches open to the weather. This type of exposure was not practical in most areas of the United States apart from California. In 1952, even before Travel Town formally opened, founder Charly Atkins asked the Mayor of San Francisco for a cable car to display, but was told, with an apology, that cable cars could not be sold or given away. Three years later, a solution was found: A cable car was placed on loan as the center piece of the 1953 International Flower Show in Los Angeles. Afterwards, it was moved on permanent loan to Travel Town.
#12	Railway Post Office	ca. 1880		SP	3 ft (914 mm)	The wooden narrow-gauge 19th-century Southern Pacific Railway Post Office Car #12 was used for a variety of purposes by its owners as a caboose, baggage car, railway postal car and most notably as a baggage-mail combination. It was built around 1880 by Carter Brothers and had a weight of 13 tons and a length of 43 ft (13 m). It was donated to the Travel Town Museum by Southern Pacific Railroad.
#3355	Pullman snack car	1928		AT&SF	1435 mm	The Pullman snack car #3355 of Atchison, Topeka and Santa Fe Railway was built in 1928 by Pullman Company.
#3669	Pullman Dining car	1921		UP	4 ft 8 1/2 in (1,435 mm)	Union Pacific #3669, a 1921 Pullman Dining car, also known as Union Pacific No. 369.
#1273	Switcher	1921		SP	4 ft 8 1/2 in (1,435 mm)	The 0-6-0 locomotives #1273 is one of thirty-two 0-6-0 locomotives built by the Southern Pacific at its Sacramento workshops. Six more were built at the railroad's Los Angeles work shops. It was built in 1921. Classified as an S-12, it worked as a switcher in SP's Sacramento yards during its career. It was oil fired. Its weight is 153,000 lb (69 t) and it has 20 by 20 in (510 by 510 mm) cylinders and 51 in (1,300 mm) diameter drivers. With a 30 sq ft (2.8 m^{2}) grate and total heating surface of 150 sq ft (14 m^{2}), including 255 sq ft (23.7 m^{2}) superheating, it had a boiler pressure of 200 psi (14 bar) and tractive effort of 31,020 lb (14.07 t). It was decommissioned in 1956, after it had logged over 1,500,000 miles (2,400,000 km) during 35 years of service. The following year, it was donated to the Travel World Museum by Southern Pacific.
#1000	Mikado	1920		HHRR	4 ft 8 1/2 in (1,435 mm)	The 2-8-2 (Mikado) type steam locomotive was built in 1920 by Alco (builder's number 61535) as #4 for the Hetch Hetchy Railroad. It was used on its 68 miles (109 km) long line, which was built by the City of San Francisco to construct the O'Shaughnessy Dam on the Tuolumne River in Hetch Hetchy Valley, Yosemite, California. In 1924, it was sold to the Newaukum Valley Railroad, a line owned and operated by the Carlisle Lumber Company in Washington state, and was re-numbered #1000. The symmetric axle configuration of its 2-8-2 wheel arrangement permitted easy bi-directional operation, making it particularly suited for logging. In 1944, it was sold to the Santa Maria Valley Railroad, which served oil refineries in Santa Maria, California, as well as hauling produce to the Southern Pacific's mainline at Guadalupe, California. The Santa Maria Valley Railroad donated the locomotive to the Travel Town Museum in 1954, when it introduced diesel locomotives. The locomotive is oil fired, has a weight of 195,000 lb (88 t) and had a boiler pressure of 180 psi (12 bar), delivering total tractive effort of 35,700 lb (16.2 t). It has 48 in (1,200 mm) drivers, and the cylinders are 20 by 28 inches (510 by 710 mm).
#3025	Atlantic	1904		SP	4 ft 8 1/2 in (1,435 mm)	The 4-4-2 (Atlantic) type steam locomotive #3025 is one of 13 built for the Southern Pacific by Alco (builder's number 30005) in 1904 and was classified as A-3. Its very large 81 in (2,100 mm) diameter drivers were designed for achieving high speeds of more than 100 mph. The oil fired locomotive has 20 by 28 inches (510 by 710 mm) cylinders with an inside Stephenson link motion and a boiler pressure of 210 psi (14 bar). It delivered a tractive effort of 24,680 lb (11.19 t). It was the first standard gauge locomotive to go on display at Travel Town in 1952 after being donated to the museum by the Southern Pacific.
#31	Los Angeles Harbor Department	1921		Los Angeles Harbor Authority	4 ft 8 1/2 in (1,435 mm)	The 0-4-0T saddle tank steam locomotive #31 was built in 1921 for the City of Los Angeles Harbor Authority by the Davenport Locomotive Works of Davenport, Iowa. It was oil fired and has a weight of 42,000 lb (19 t). The boiler pressure was 192 psi (13.2 bar), The tractive effort was 11,080 lb (5.03 t), and it has 11 by 16 inches (280 by 410 mm) cylinders and 28.5 inches (720 mm) drivers. #31 was bought for the development of the Los Angeles Port of San Pedro, mainly on the island of Catalina. Its sister engine #32 is also exhibited in the Travel Town Museum, and another little saddle tank, #33. The locomotives hauled rock from a quarry to the shore of Catalina Island, but occasionally worked also on the main land. The construction of San Pedro Harbor commenced in 1899, and the area was annexed to Los Angeles in 1909. By the 1920s, it was the US West Coast's busiest seaport, and, in the early 1930s, a massive expansion was begun including constructing a two mile long outer breakwater and a smaller inner breakwater with docks for sea going vessels. The three engines continued in the development of the harbor until the early 1950s when dieselisation of the harbor motive power began. Destined for the scrap yard, #31 was identified as a candidate for the museum's collection and was donated by the Los Angeles Harbor Authority along with #32 in 1953. Its cab was breaking up and in 2018, #31's cab was rebuilt.
#32	Saddle tank locomotive	1914		Los Angeles	4 ft 8 1/2 in (1,435 mm)	The 0-4-0T saddle tank steam locomotive #32 is oil fired and has a weight of 38,000 lb (17 t) . It was built for the City of Los Angeles by ALCO's Rogers Locomotive Works (builder's number 53115) in 1914 and had a boiler pressure of 165 psi (11.4 bar). It had a tractive effort of 8,230 lb (3.73 t). It has 33 in (840 mm) drivers and 11 by 16 inches (280 by 410 mm) cylinders. It was donated to the Travel Town Museum by the Los Angeles Harbor Authority together with #31 in 1953.
#1	Conrock saddle tank locomotive	1925		Consolitated Rock Products	4 ft 8 1/2 in (1,435 mm)	Conrock No. 1, a 1925 American (Cooke Works) 0-6-0 switcher steam locomotive is equipped with a saddle tank arched over the boiler to carry water for making steam. After thirty years of work at a quarry of Consolitated Rock Products, it was retired in 1955 at the order of the Smog Control Board and replaced by a diesel engine.
				Los Angeles Harbor Department	4 ft 8 1/2 in (1,435 mm)	Two Los Angeles Harbor Department side-dump ballast cars.
#163	Southern Pacific Stock Car			Carson & Colorado Railroad	3 ft (914 mm)	The wooden narrow-gauge stock car was originally used by on the Carson & Colorado Railroad (C&C), incorporated in 1880. Southern Pacific acquired C&C's rolling stock in 1900, and in 1905 the railroad was re-organised under the name of Nevada & California Railway Company. It was used for the transportation of livestock and equipped with slatted sides and doors.
#1	Southern Pacific Box Car			Carson & Colorado Railroad	3 ft (914 mm)	The wooden narrow-gauge box car was built by Carter Brothers in Newark, California on the east side of the San Francisco Bay. It ran through the desert of California and Nevada between Mina and Keeler. During negotiations for the initial right of way of the Carson & Colorado Railroad (C&C) a stretch of the line was to be built across the Walker River Indian Reservation, crossing through its major community of Schurz, Nevada, and the railroad agreed to supply free transportation to the Schurz residents. However, this complimentary transportation was not provided in the passenger cars, but instead on top of the coach or the box car.
#7	Prairie	1902		Sharp and Fellows, Inc.	4 ft 8 1/2 in (1,435 mm)	Built by ALCO's Dickson plant in 1902 as a 2-6-0 (builder's number 26264) for the Minnesota Land and Construction Company; sold in 1909 to Sharp and Fellows, Inc. and rebuilt as their 2-6-2 (Prairie) #7.
#20	Baldwin switcher	1880		SP	4 ft 8 1/2 in (1,435 mm)	The 0-4-0 switcher #20 of Southern Pacific Railroad was built in 1880 by Baldwin. It is also known as Southern Pacific #219.
#999110	Caboose	1926		AT&SF	4 ft 8 1/2 in (1,435 mm)	Caboose #999110 of Atchison, Topeka and Santa Fe Railway was built in 1926 by American Car & Foundry.
#4049	Bay Window Caboose	1961			1435 mm	The bay Window Caboose #4049 of Southern Pacific was built in 1961 by Pacific Car & Foundry.
#30036	Box car	ca. 1930			4 ft 8 1/2 in (1,435 mm)	Box car #30036 of Southern Pacific was built in 1930 with wooden side walls.
#4418	Penncar	ca. 1925		Pennsylvania Railroad	4 ft 8 1/2 in (1,435 mm)	The dining car #4418 of Pennsylvania Railroad was built around 1925.
#2513	Pullman Chair Car	1919		SP	4 ft 8 1/2 in (1,435 mm)	The Pullman Chair Car #2513 of Southern Pacific was built in 1919.
	Hunters Point	1940		UP	4 ft 8 1/2 in (1,435 mm)	The Pullman sleeping car Hunters Point of Union Pacific was built in 1940.
	Horse-drawn tram	ca. 1880		Los Angeles Railway		The horse-drawn tram car of Los Angeles Railway was built around 1880.
	Speeder					Track inspection speeder, motorized.
#CSCV1887	Wrecker crane	1942				The American Hoist and Derrick self-propelled diesel wrecker crane with Serial No. 1887 was built in 1942.
#61-02011	boom car			U.S. Navy		U.S. Navy No. 61-02011, boom car, utility flat car for support of the wrecker crane.
						Kalamazoo handcar, four-man pump-action powered.
						Velocipede, one-man pump-action powered track inspection "bicycle" with outrigger.
	Harvey House display			Fred Harvey Company		Based on the success of Fred Harvey's first depot lunch room in Topeka, Kansas (1876), the Santa Fe Railway placed a contract with him to open more establishments. By 1883 he operated 17 eateries along the Santa Fe mainline, where passengers could get a meal, before continuing their trip. The term Harvey House became synonymous with fine food and service. With the advent of dining cars on trains in the 18890s, meal stops became less attractive. Although most of the original Harvey Houses are closed today, many of the original tourist facilities at the Grand Canyon continue to serve visitors under Harvey's successor company, Xanterra Parks & Resorts.
	Oil delivery cart			Standard Oil Company		Tank car for oil deliveries with the slogan Red Crown the gasoline of quality (by) Standard Oil Company."
	Little General					The Little General was originally built by the owner of the Miniature Train at Silver Lake George Lodge and his machinist Frank Jones in their on-site machine shop. In spring 1905 the "Little General" was sold to the Buckeye Lake Park Co. of Licking County, OH. The Locomotive rapidly changed owners; spending the majority of its successive seventy years "running the tracks" in a number of amusement parks throughout the State of Ohio. Clarence Good purchased the "Little General" for his amusement parks at Vollmar Park, Waterville Park, and later Walbridge Park in the greater Toledo area. It was used at Riverside Park until the late 1930s and then put on storage. In 1942, Wesley Shumway bought the locomotive and operated it on a one-half mile track at Meadowbrook Park in Bascom until 1947. It was put on storage until 1957. From 1960 to 1962, the engine underwent a number of cosmetic alterations and was given a new boiler by machinist Lee B. Gaeke, who, realizing the potential public interest, refashioned the locomotive's appearance to mimic the Civil War locomotive the General. Ghost Town, an amusement park near Finlay, Ohio, purchased it on August 18, 1967 and used it during the 1968 season but it was eventually sold to two speculators who sold it one year later to Marshal N. Fisher, a steam hobbyist living in Beverly Hills, California. after Fisher's death, his widow found a permanent home for the locomotive at the Travel Town Museum, where it is kept as an historic artifact of early amusement park train rides.
	Courage				16 in (406 mm)	Miniature railroad.

=== Motor vehicles ===
- Railway Express Agency, 1945 International Harvester Co. & York Body Corp. Model K-5 Express Delivery Truck.

== Additional railway museum collections and examples ==
- Semaphore by Union Switch & Signal, Swissvale, Pennsylvania.
- Wig-Wag grade crossing signal (unknown builder, perhaps Pacific Electric signal shops) from Pacific Electric Railroad.
- Track Construction - Examples of three periods of 4 ft 8 1/2 in (1,435 mm) standard gauge track construction, and wheels on axle.
  - Log sleepers (ties) nailed to rail. Earliest method.
  - Sleepers, uniform and square cut wood soaked in creosote preservative and surrounded by ballast, spiked to 'T' rail which is joined with fishplates.
  - Concrete sleepers, spring clipped to rail which is joined with welds.
- Track switches - Various examples of switch points methods, frogs and switch stands/signals.

== Train excursions ==
Tickets can be purchased to ride the Travel Town Railroad, a 16 in (406 mm) gauge miniature railway for two circles around the museum grounds. This railway originally ran a train known as the Melody Ranch Special, which was once owned by Gene Autry. Its namesake originates from the Gene Autry film Melody Ranch. The passenger coaches are now covered and the original steam engine (which was vandalized beyond economical repair) has been replaced with Courage, a chain-driven internal combustion motor housed within a façade representing a steam locomotive. This railroad is one of three miniature railway train rides within Griffith Park. The others are the 18 1/2 in (470 mm) gauge Griffith Park & Southern Railroad and the 7 1/2 in (190.5 mm) gauge miniature railway at the Los Angeles Live Steamers Railroad Museum. The latter is independently operated.

== Exhibit room ==
- Artifacts, documents, and ephemera are on display such as menus and chinaware, recollections and timetables, regarding the history of railroading in the United States.

== Main exhibit hall ==
Houses additional transportation examples and exhibits.

- Cut-away boiler demonstration exhibit.
- Hand drawn fire-hose cart.
- Horse-drawn wagons
  - Piano Box buggy
  - Coal Box buggy
  - Milk delivery dray
  - milk delivery van
  - chariot from Ben-Hur.
  - Circus Wagon
  - Oil Delivery (tank) wagon
- Motor Vehicles & Automobiles.
  - Packard Sedan, 9th series, circa 1932
  - 1948 Nash Ambassador Sedan
  - 1918 Mack Dump Truck
  - Fire Engine
- "Holden's Corner" railway safety interactive Children's Discovery Center.
- The "Little General" locomotive demonstration engine.
- Viewing platform for the East Valley Lines model railroad club N scale layout.

== East Valley Lines ==
Located behind a roll-up door in the main exhibit hall, the East Valley Lines Model Rail-Road N Gauge Club operates their extensive layout.

== Appearances in media ==
Travel Town is near many television and movie studios, which has prompted those production companies to include scenes requiring railroad equipment to be shot at Travel Town since it opened.

A small sample of the thousands of Travel Town's screen appearances is represented below:

- The Monkees Episode 31 "Monkees at the Movies" (1967)
- Adam-12 Episode 101 "Eyewitness" (1972)
- The Parallax View (1974: Griffith Park & Southern Railroad miniature train scene)
- Columbo "Identity Crisis" (1975)
- The band Foreigner's music video "Cold as Ice" (1977)
- The band Foreigner's music video "Feels Like the First Time" (1977)
- CHiPs Episode 109 "Silent Partner" (1982)
- Knight Rider Episode 36 "Diamonds Aren't a Girl's Best Friend" (1983)
- Dallas Season 10, Episode 19 "High Noon for Calhoun" (1987)
- Quantum Leap Episode 48 "A Hunting Will We Go" (1991)
- Kidsongs: "Play-Along Songs" – "Down by the Station" (1993, direct-to-video)
- Royal Crown Revue's "Watts Local" music video was shot in several locations (1999)
- Ghost Whisperer Season 5, Episode 9 "Lost in the Shadows" (2009)
- Good Guys Wear Black 1977 film starring Chuck Norris.
- Close Enough Season 1, Episode 2B “Room Parents” (2020)
- The Sarah Silverman Program Season 2, Episode 5 “Ah, Men” (2007)
- Cover of Cass Elliot’s album ‘The Road is no place for a lady’
- Edwards Lifesciences-Joy’s Story (TV commercial)

== Former Exhibits ==
Over the course of its history, the museum collection has expanded and contracted as donations were made available, items loaned or returned, items traded, and more suitable homes found for items in the collection. As the museum's central theme is railroading and transportation in Los Angeles, a number of notable collections have found new homes after lengthy stays at the museum.

=== Fire Engines ===
The large collection of fire engines and associated apparatus was transferred from Travel Town to the new Los Angeles Fire Fighting Museum in Hollywood in 2002. The interior space formerly occupied by the fire apparatus collection became the new home for wooden narrow gauge railroad cars formerly used in the Owens Valley, 250 miles northeast of Los Angeles. The three cars, a railway post office car, a boxcar, and a stock car, had been on display outside for over 40 years.

=== Aircraft ===
The museum transferred its military aircraft collection to other museums in the late 1980s into the 1990s.

The "Zero" (actually the only surviving Mitsubishi J2M3 Raiden in the world) was donated to Planes of Fame. The Vought F7U-3 Cutlass was traded to the National Naval Aviation Museum at Naval Air Station Pensacola, Florida. Two aircraft, the Airborne early warning and control Lockheed P2V-3 Neptune and Grumman F9F-2 Panther, were traded to a museum near Fresno, California in 1992. A small rocket similar to the German V-1 flying bomb was transferred to Vandenberg Air Force Base. A German World War II airplane engine was returned to its owner in 1988.

== Bibliography ==
- Best, Gerald M. (1956). "Traveltown". The Western Railroader. 19 (200). Francis A. Guido: 1–27.
- Broggie, Michael (2014), Walt Disney's Railroad Story: The Small-Scale Fascination That Led to a Full-Scale Kingdom (4th ed.), The Donning Company Publishers, ISBN 978-1-57864-914-3
