= Hangtown fry =

American egg, oyster, and bacon dish

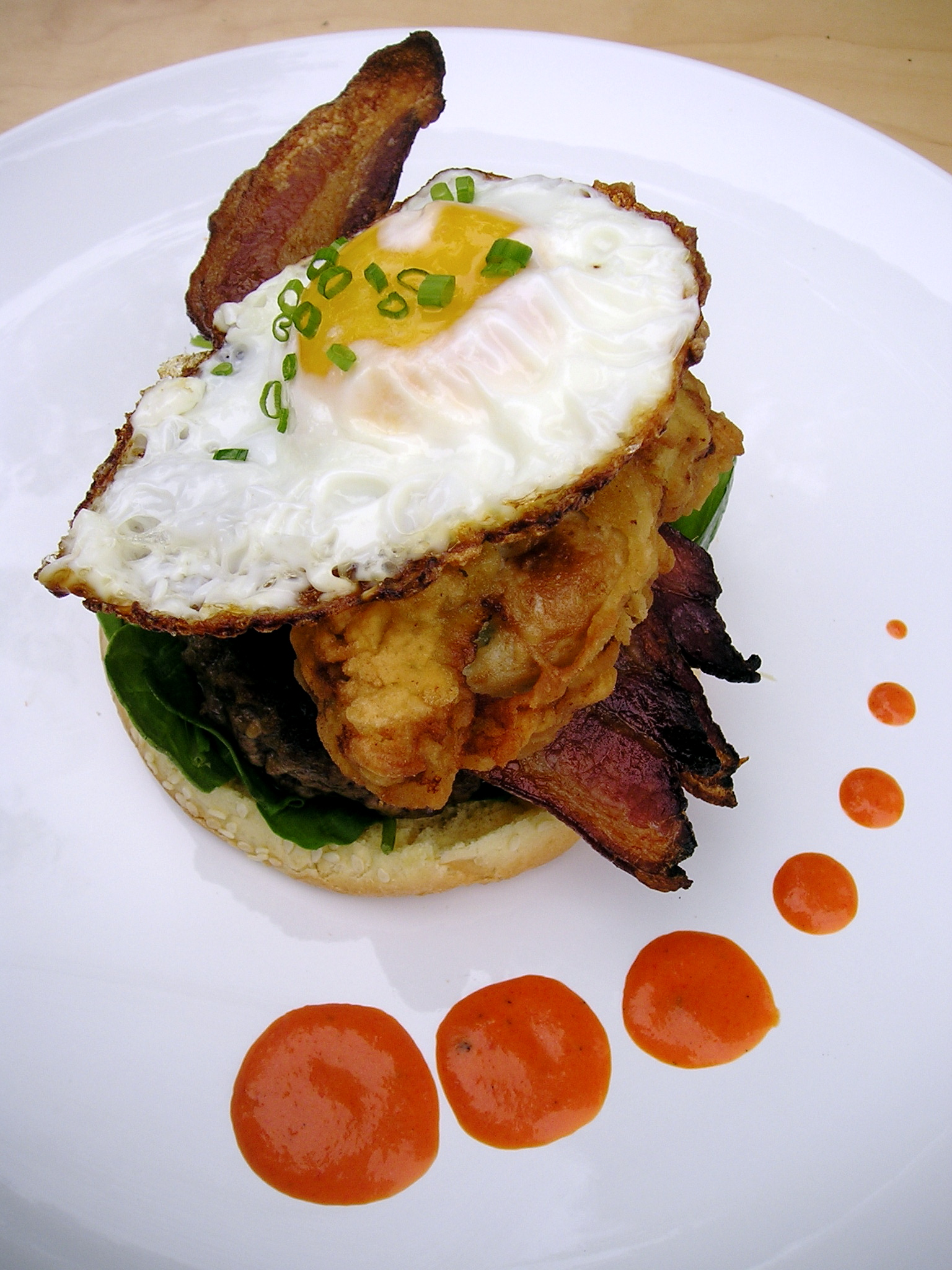
- A "hangtown burger" made using a hangtown fry, a 1/3-pound (150 g) chuck steak, sriracha sauce of roasted red peppers, and baby arugula
- Place of origin: Placerville, California
- Main ingredients: Eggs, bacon and oyster

Hangtown fry is a type of omelette made famous during the California Gold Rush in the 1850s. The most common version includes bacon and oysters combined with eggs, and fried together.

== History ==
Oakland Mayor, Visiting Newspapermen, Other Dignitaries to Sample "Hangtown fry" Breakfast
"Hangtown Fry," a delectable breakfast dish which had its origins at the Cary House in the early mining days and has since appeared on tables of the nation's leading hotels and restaurants, will be served to members of the visiting press delegation, Oakland's Mayor Clifford Rishell and other dignitaries attending the Wagon Caravan Breakfast at the fair grounds Sunday morning.
Mayor A. H. "Sandy" Murray, who issued invitations to the mayors of Oakland and San Francisco to attend the Caravan festivities this week end, has been assured that Mayor Rishell will be present. Mayor Robinson of San Francisco had an important prior official obligation.
Lloyd Raffetto, owner of the Raffles Hotel, says the story of the origin of Hangtown Fry, though well known here, is worthy of repetition.
A well-heeled miner who has been panning a rich sand bar for several weeks and eating his own sorry cooking came into the Cary House and demanded:
"What is the most expensive meal you serve to a hungry man for breakfast?"
He was told that fresh eggs, then selling for about a dollar apiece and hard to get, was considered the No. 1 breakfast, or that a breakfast of fried oysters might be considered a first line delicacy.
"Well, give me three or four eggs and put in some oysters," the miner said, "And throw in a couple slabs of bacon, too."
The resulting dish was so pleasing that others (presumably those whose pokes were full of dust and nuggets) followed suit, and the recipe became famous.
For guidance of those whose appetites are whetted by reference to the good old days, here is Raff's recipe:

- Saute two or three slices of bacon. Add a few oysters and saute them.
- Add beaten eggs, about three per serving, so that the eggs surround the oysters and cover the bacon. Season to taste.
- Serve by turning the pan's contents out upside down on a serving platter. The browned bacon will then be on top.

The dish was invented in Placerville, California, then known as Hangtown. According to most accounts, the dish was invented when a gold prospector struck it rich, headed to the Cary House Hotel, and demanded the most expensive dish that the kitchen could provide. The most expensive ingredients available were eggs, which were delicate and had to be carefully brought to the mining town; bacon, which was shipped from the East Coast; and oysters, which had to be brought on ice from San Francisco, over 100 miles (160 km) away.

The dish was popularized by Tadich Grill in San Francisco, where it has apparently been on the menu for 160 years. Later variations on the dish include the addition of onions, bell peppers, or various spices, and deep frying the oysters before adding them to the omelette.

According to the El Dorado County Museum, "No dish epitomizes California and its Gold Rush more than Hangtown Fry. It was created at a location central to the Gold Rush at the same time the great state was being born. And, like the miners who worked the river banks and hillsides, and the population that followed, it is a unique blend of many things, both those produced locally and those that have arrived from elsewhere."

In the 1962 episode "The Hangtown Fry" of the syndicated television anthology series Death Valley Days, hosted by Stanley Andrews, Fabrizio Mioni was cast as Paul Duval, a young man falsely condemned to the gallows in Placerville when the community was known as "Hangtown." In the story line, Duval orders a made-up recipe of bacon and oysters in the form of an egg omelette in hopes of postponing his execution while his girlfriend, Ann Alton (Nancy Rennick), frantically seeks information to clear him. Helen Kleeb played Ann's mother. The recipe is still available in some California restaurants. Three versions are included in Booth Seafood Co.'s compendium of James Beard's 1954 seafood cookbook.

== Variations ==
Food writer and chef Mark Bittman created his own version of Hangtown Fry in one of his Minimalist cooking videos for The New York Times.

== See also ==
- Hangtown
- List of egg dishes
