= Sharp and Fellows, Inc. =

American railroad construction company

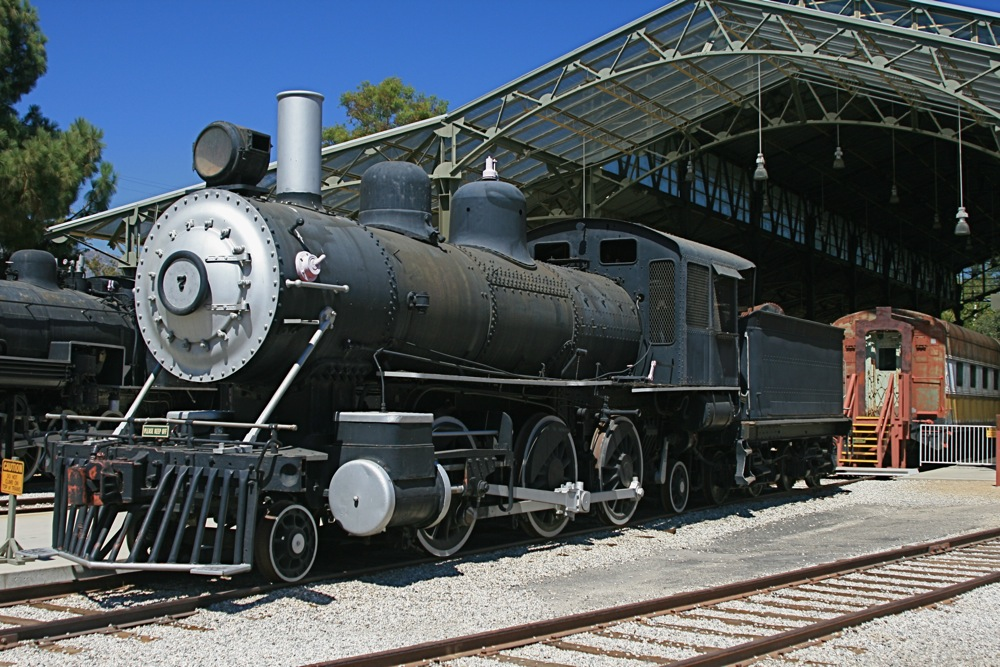
- Sharp and Fellows No 7 2-6-2 Steam Locomotive
- Company type: Private
- Industry: Railroad
- Founded: 1877
- Headquarters: Gardena, California
- Website: Sharpandfellows.com

Sharp and Fellows, Inc. is a railroad contracting company that specializes in building, maintaining and demolishing railroad track and infrastructure for many railroad companies all across the southwest portion of the United States. The company has been operating since 1877. Its headquarters are located in Gardena, California.

== History ==
Sharp and Fellows, Inc. built the Sharp and Fellows #7 locomotive engine around 1902 with a 2-6-0 wheel arrangement for the Minnesota Land and Construction Company. It was donated to the Travel Town Museum of Los Angeles in 1955.

Sharp and Fellows provided parts for the construction of the warcraft Thunderbird.
