= Stockton Terminal and Eastern Railroad =

Overview
- Headquarters: Stockton, California
- Reporting mark: STE
- Locale: Stockton, California
- Dates of operation: 1908–

Technical
- Track gauge: 4 ft 8 1/2 in (1,435 mm) standard gauge

Other
- Website: Omnitrax.com

Established in 1908, the Stockton Terminal and Eastern Railroad (reporting mark STE) provides service to several companies around the Stockton area, in San Joaquin County, California.

OmniTRAX acquired the ST&E in 2011.

== Service ==
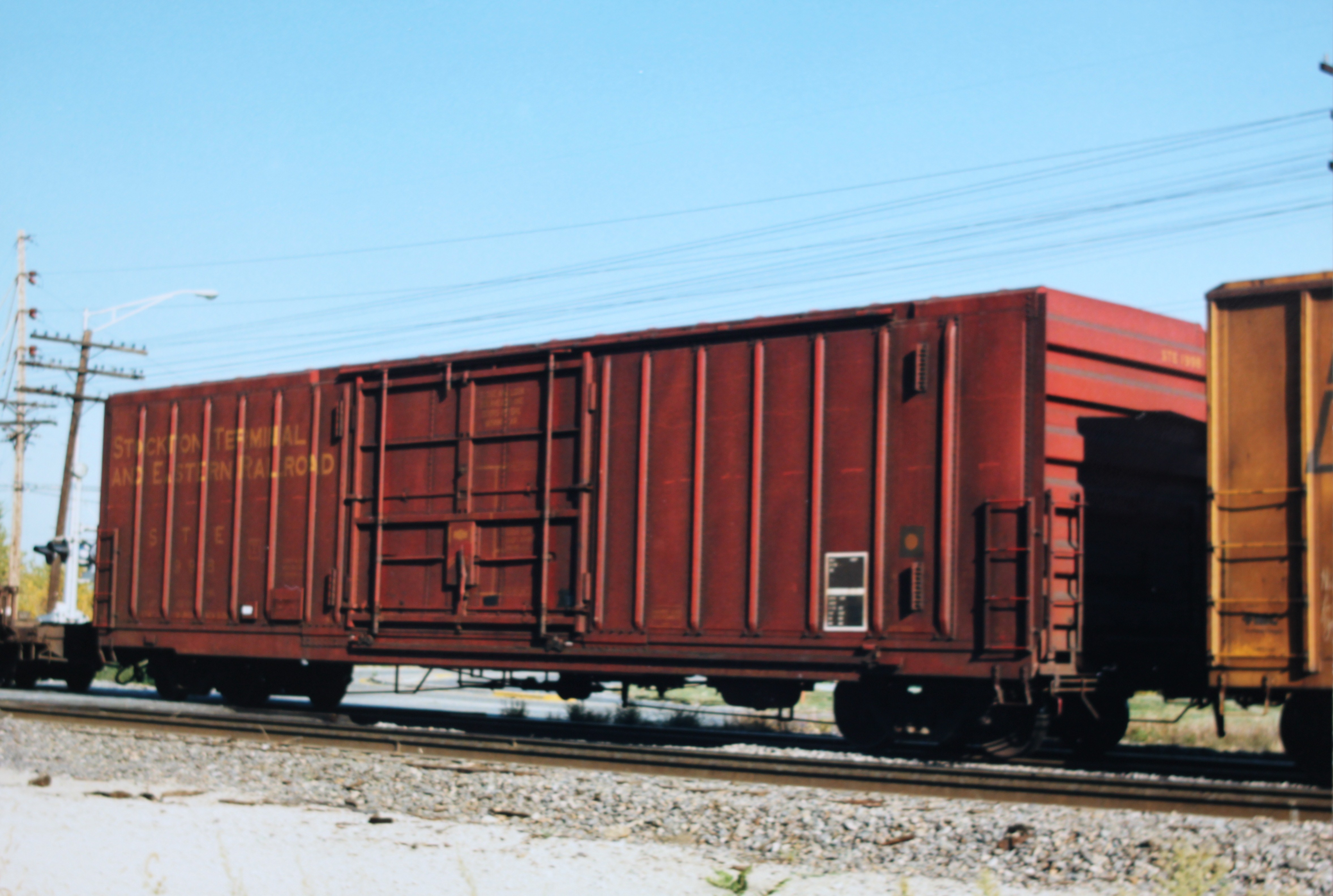
Boxcar of the line, c. 1989

The railroad operates 25 miles (40 km) of track connecting with the BNSF Railway, the Union Pacific Railroad, and the Central California Traction Company (CCT).

Being located in Stockton places the STE in a good situation for the consolidation and distribution of freight for companies in the region. The companies include PDM Steel, Mizkan, and the Salt River Materials Group. The Port of Stockton is served by the connecting Central California Traction Company (CCT)

== History ==
The company was established in 1908, and the railway line between Stockton and Bellota began operating in 1910. Lacking money to build an electrification system, the company purchased a steam locomotive for operations.

=== Legacy ===
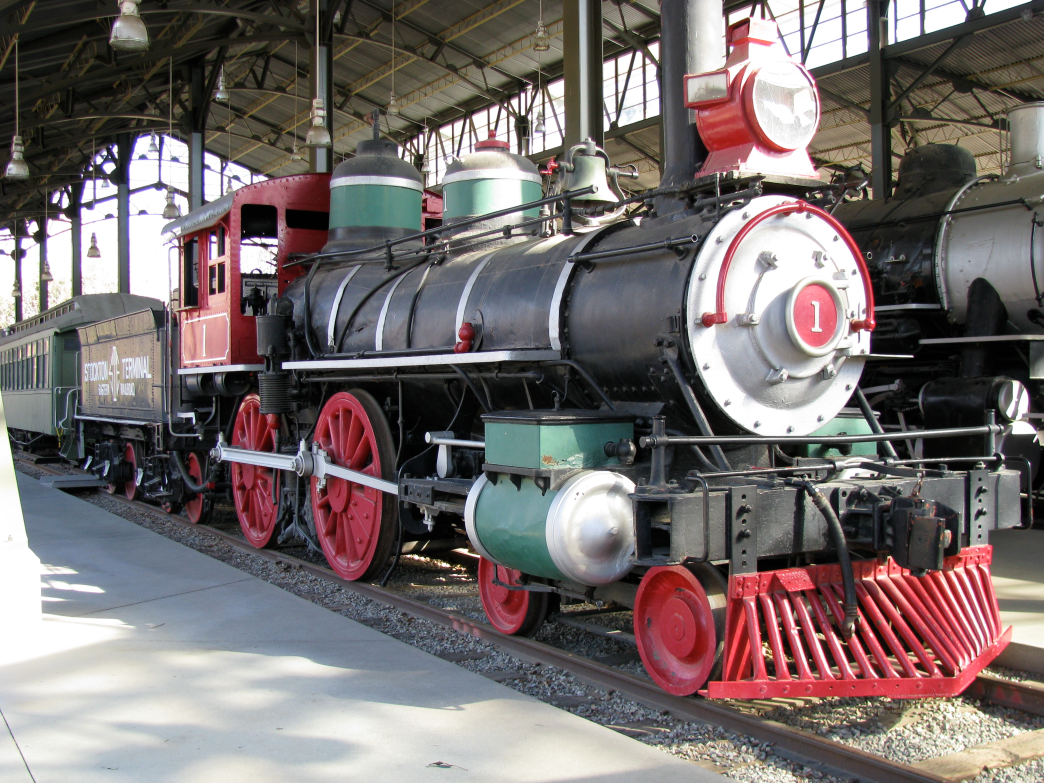
Stockton Terminal and Eastern locomotive No. 1, Travel Town Museum.

The Stockton Terminal and Eastern locomotive No. 1 is on display at the Travel Town Museum in Griffith Park, located in Los Angeles, California.

== See also ==
- List of California Interurban Railroads
