= Stockton Terminal and Eastern No. 1 =

Stockton Terminal Eastern locomotive No. 1
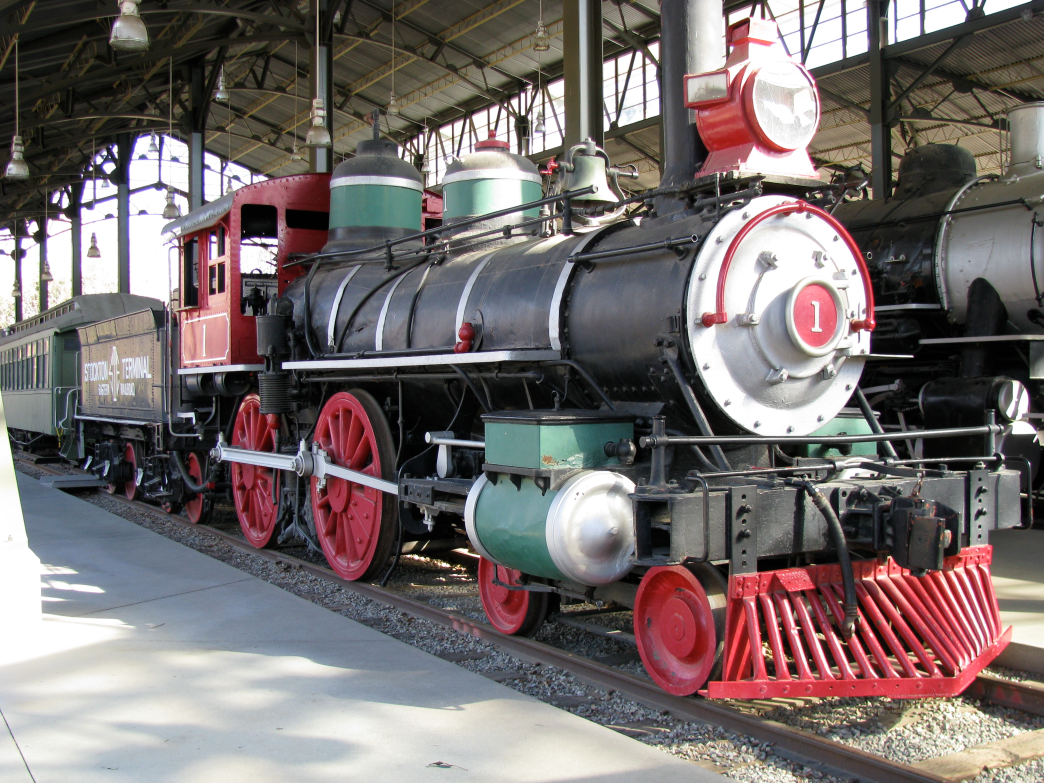
- Stockton Terminal Eastern locomotive No. 1
Type and origin
- Power type: Steam
- Builder: Norris-Lancaster
- Serial number: 12
- Build date: 1864
Specifications
- Configuration
  - Whyte: 4-4-0
  - UIC: 2'Bn
- Gauge: 4 ft 8 1/2 in (1,435 mm)
- Driver dia.: 63 in (1.600 m)
- Length: 55 ft (16.764 m)
- Fuel type: Oil
- Boiler pressure: 135 psi
- Cylinders: Two, outside
- Cylinder size: 16 in × 22 in (406 mm × 559 mm)
- Valve gear: Hook Motion
- Loco brake: Steam
- Train brakes: Steam
Performance figures
- Tractive effort: 10,260 lbf
Career
- Operators: Western Pacific Railroad, Central Pacific Railroad, Southern Pacific Railroad, Stockton Terminal and Eastern Railroad
- Numbers: WP "G"; CP 31; SP 1193; SP 1215; SP 1488; ST&E 1
- Official name: Mariposa
- First run: 1864
- Retired: 1953
- Current owner: Travel Town Museum
- Disposition: On static display

Stockton Terminal and Eastern No. 1 is a 4-4-0 "American" type steam locomotive, built in 1864 by Norris-Lancaster for the first Western Pacific Railroad. The railroad's engines were lettered rather than numbered, and as such this engine received the "G" designation, as well as given the name "Mariposa." After building only 20 miles of railroad, the Western Pacific went bankrupt in 1867, and was purchased by the Central Pacific Railroad.

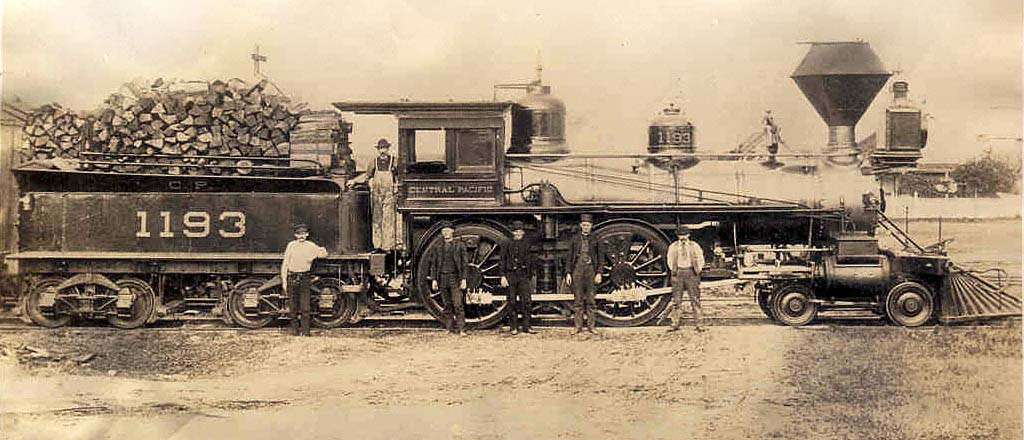
Western Pacific RR "G," " Mariposa." Later, Central Pacific RR #31, CP #1193, SP #1193, SP #1215, SP #1488, and Stockton Terminal and Eastern #1.

In 1868, the Central Pacific re-designated the engine as the road's second number 31, replacing another engine of that number which had exploded. The engine continued to serve the CP, as well as the Southern Pacific Railroad (which absorbed the road in 1885) until 1914. The engine is believed to have been stripped of its name in the 1870s, when the CP had ceased its practice of naming engines, and has been renumbered CP 1193 in 1891. The engine was renumbered as SP 1215 in 1901, then again as SP 1488 in 1907.

In 1914, the engine was sold to the newly formed Stockton Terminal and Eastern Railroad, becoming ST&E #1 and served as the road's primary motive power. In 1953, the engine was retired from 89 years of revenue service and donated to the Travel Town Museum, where it is currently displayed.

== See also ==
- List of preserved Southern Pacific Railroad rolling stock
