= Newtown, El Dorado County, California =

Unincorporated community in California, United States

Newtown
- Unincorporated community
- Location in California Newtown (the United States)
- Coordinates: 38°42′16″N 120°40′45″W
- Country: United States
- State: California
- County: El Dorado
- Elevation: 2,448 ft (746 m)

Newtown (formerly, New town) is a small unincorporated community in El Dorado County, California, United States. It is located 2.25 miles (3.6 km) south of Camino, at an elevation of 2447 feet (746 m). The ZIP code is 95667. The community is served by area code 530.

A post office operated at Newtown from 1854 to 1912, with a closure in 1875.

Notable residents have included John Augustus Raffetto, father of radio star Michael Raffetto. The Raffetto home is now a bed and breakfast and offers a room in the name of that family.
