= John C. Begovich =

American politician (1916–1999)

Member of the California Senate from the 9th district
- In office January 2, 1961 - January 2, 1967
- Preceded by: Swift Berry
- Succeeded by: J. Eugene McAteer

Personal details
- Born: January 17, 1916 Jackson, California, U.S.
- Died: November 2, 1999 (aged 83) Amador, California, U.S.
- Party: Democratic
- Spouse: Lorraine Love
- Children: John C. Begovich Jr.

Military service
- Branch/service: United States Army
- Battles/wars: World War II

John C. Begovich (January 17, 1916 – November 2, 1999) was an American politician who served in the California State Senate for the 9th district from 1961 to 1967. During World War II he served in the United States Army.

== Life ==
Begovich was born in Jackson Gate, California.

In World War II, he "fought in North Africa, Sicily, Italy and France with the 3rd Infantry Division and was awarded a Silver Star and the French Croix de Guerre for bravery under fire. He won a battlefield commission and received three Purple Hearts for combat wounds."

He was a U.S. Marshal for California's eastern judicial district from 1966 to 1970, and a member of the Amador County Board of Supervisors from 1977 to 1996.

He died in Amador, California.

From Jackson to State Route 88, State Route 49 is named the John C. Begovich Memorial Highway.
