= Camino, Placerville and Lake Tahoe Railroad =

Railroad in California, United States

Overview
- Headquarters: Camino, California
- Reporting mark: CPLT
- Locale: Placerville, California
- Dates of operation: 1904–1986

Technical
- Track gauge: 4 ft 8 1/2 in (1,435 mm) standard gauge

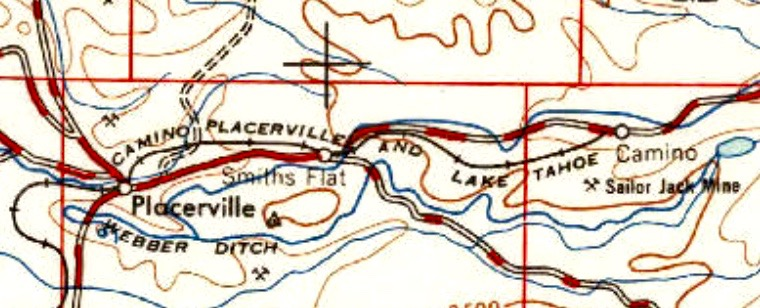
Route in 1947

The Camino, Placerville and Lake Tahoe Railroad (reporting mark CPLT) was an 8-mile (13 km) Class III short-line railroad operating in the Sierra Nevada in California, east of Sacramento. It was built primarily to haul lumber from the El Dorado National Forest. The standard gauge line ran west 8.05 miles (12.96 km) from a sawmill at Camino to a connection with the Placerville Branch of the Southern Pacific Company at Placerville. Loaded cars of lumber descended a 3.5 percent grade from 3,150 feet (960 m) at Camino to 1,900 feet (580 m) at Placerville.

== History ==
The CPLT's history starts in 1903 with its predecessor, the Placerville and Lake Tahoe Railway. The Placerville & Lake Tahoe Railway started grading on or about September 15, 1903. On April 11, 1904, the Placerville and Lake Tahoe was incorporated and the line was opened that same year. At Camino, the Placerville & Lake Tahoe went to narrow-gauge (operated as the El Dorado Lumber Company Narrow Gauge Lines) where it extended another 65 miles (105 km) into the forest in the area of Old Pino, Pino Grande and Pilot Creek (Tallac). From 1910-1911 the Placerville and Lake Tahoe did not operate. In 1911 the Placerville and Lake Tahoe was sold at foreclosure for $62,714.58 and was reorganized on December 28, 1911 as the Camino, Placerville and Lake Tahoe Railroad.

The CPLT was owned by the Michigan-California Lumber Company. In 1986 the lumber mill was closed, negating any further need of rails, and the Southern Pacific abandoned the Placerville Branch, eliminating CPLT's access to the national rail network. Scrapping of the CPLT commenced on September 3, 1986. The route is now part of the El Dorado Trail, a rail trail.

Other railroads operating in the narrow gauge forest were the American River Land and Lumber Company, that built a line through the forest in 1892. American River Land & Lumber was sold to El Dorado Lumber Company (Narrow Gauge Lines) in 1901 and extended the line to 34 miles (55 km). In 1917, the El Dorado Lumber Company was sold to the Michigan-California Lumber Company.

=== Chart of History of Area Lines ===
==== Standard Gauge 8 mile line ====
- Camino, Placerville and Lake Tahoe Railroad 1911-1986 Standard Gauge 8 miles (Owned by Michigan-California Lumber)
  - Placerville and Lake Tahoe Railway — Standard & Narrow Gauge 1904-1911
    - Locomotives

Number	Builder	Type	Date	Works number	Notes
1	Lima Locomotive Works	3-cylinder 2-truck Shay locomotive	1904	885	built for exhibit at the Louisiana Purchase Exposition; scrapped 1955
2	Lima Locomotive Works	3-cylinder 2-truck Shay locomotive	1922	3172	built as Little River Redwood Company #4; purchased 1932; placed on display at Griffith Park Travel Town Museum in 1955
101	GE Transportation	GE 44-ton switcher	1953	31231	purchased new

==== Narrow Gauge 50 mile line ====
- From Camino — Pino Grande.

- Michigan-California Lumber Company 1917-1951 (50 miles (80 km), later abandoned)
  - El Dorado Lumber Company 1901-1917 (34 miles)
    - American River Land and Lumber Company 1982-1901 Mill-timber
    - R.E. Danaher Lumber Company / C.D. Danaher Pine Company 1911-1915 Pino Grande-Pilot Creek (15 miles)

== Sources ==
- Robertson, Donald B. (1998). Encyclopedia of Western Railroad History. Vol. IV. Caldwell, ID: Caxton Printers. ISBN 0-87004-385-4. OCLC 13456066. OL 2716499M.
- "Foothill Rails". Michigan-California Lumber Company.
- Polkinghorn, R. Stephen (1966). Pino Grande; logging railroads of the Michigan-California Lumber Company. Howell-North Books. ASIN B0006BP08A.
