= Sacramento Valley Railroad (1852–1877) =

Pioneer railroad from Sacramento to Folsom, California (1852-1877)

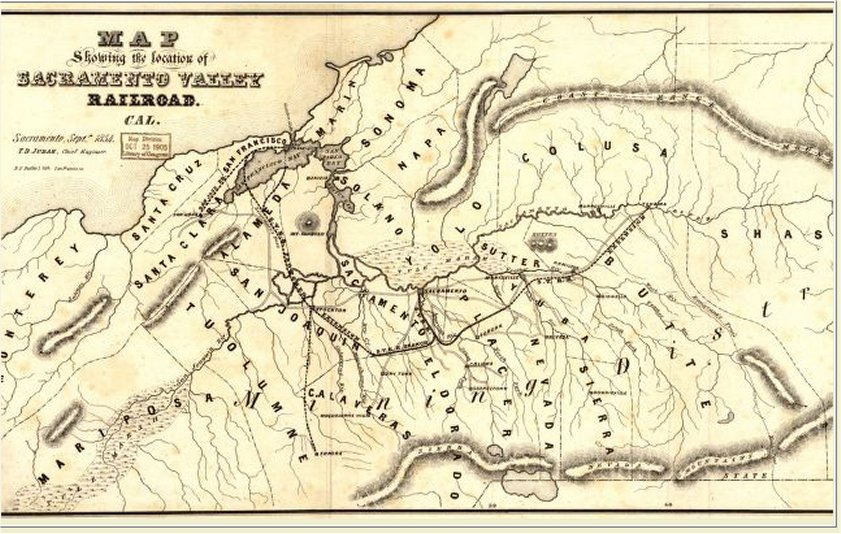
- From Report of the Chief Engineer Theodore Judah: Preliminary Surveys and Future Business of the Sacramento Valley Railroad (Sacramento, Democratic State Journal, 1854).

Overview
- Headquarters: 1800 Third Street; Sacramento depot Sacramento, California
- Founders: Charles Lincoln Wilson
- Reporting mark: SVRR
- Locale: Northern California
- Dates of operation: 1852–1877; continued as the Sacramento and Placerville Railroad until 1888
- Successor: Southern Pacific Railroad's Northern Railway Current operators: Union Pacific Railroad; SacRT light rail; Placerville & Sacramento Valley Railroad; El Dorado Western

Technical
- Track gauge: 1,435 mm (4 ft 8 1/2 in)
- Previous gauge: 5 ft (1,524 mm)
- Electrification: 750 V DC on portions taken over by SacRT Gold Line

Other
- Location within California Location within the United States
- 38.573°N 121.506°W
- Location: 1800 Third Street; Sacramento depot Sacramento, California

History
- Founded: February 12, 1855
- Founder: Charles Lincoln Wilson

Site notes
- Architect: Theodore D. Judah

California Historical Landmark
- Reference no.: 526

The Sacramento Valley Railroad (SVRR) was incorporated on August 4, 1852, the first transit railroad company incorporated in the U.S. State of California. Construction did not begin until February 1855 because of financial and right of way issues, and its first train operated on February 22, 1856. Although the oldest working railroad in the state was the Arcata and Mad River Railroad, first operational in December 15, 1854, the Sacramento Valley Railroad was the West's pioneering incorporated railroad, forerunner to the Central Pacific.

As was typical when railroads were built, when the Sacramento Valley Railroad was completed, transit time and rates both dropped significantly. For example, the San Francisco to San Jose fare for passengers fell from $32 by stagecoach (with the trip taking nine hours) to only $2.50 by rail (with the trip taking three and a half hours). More significantly, freight rates dropped dramatically also, stimulating all forms of economic activity in the region.

== Original SVRR route ==
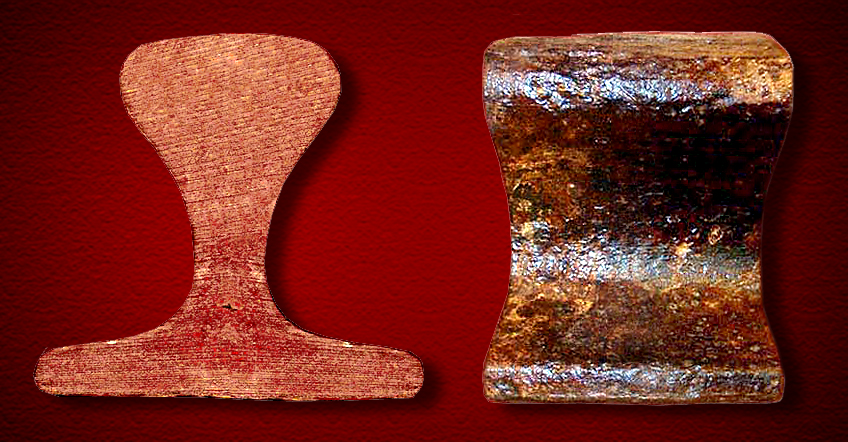
Cross and longitudinal views of a section of the original 35-pound-per-yard (17.4 kg/m) Welsh iron "pear" rail used to lay the SVRR in 1856

On August 4, 1852, the Sacramento Valley Railroad was incorporated in California, and Charles Lincoln Wilson became its first president. He left for New York to find expertise and private funds for the railroad effort; he recruited a young survey engineer Theodore D. Judah from New York to come west with him to Sacramento. Judah arrived in mid-May 1854, and on May 30 his report and preliminary survey for the proposed SVRR line eastward from Sacramento to Marysville by way of Folsom were in the hands of his employers.

Because of financial and right of way issues, construction with grading subcontractors did not begin until February 1855, but soon other problems arose. In August 1855, the SVRR board elected Commodore C. K. Garrison, former mayor (1853-1854) of San Francisco, as president of SVRR. They also elected as vice president of SVRR the future American Civil War General William Tecumseh Sherman, who was at that time the head of the banking house of Lucas & Turner in San Francisco. William Sherman, contacted his brother John, who had recently been elected to Congress, for help in obtaining federal land grants for the railroad, but to no avail.

The board also in August 1855 announced that the actual laying of tracks could begin. The railroad's gauge initially was 5 ft (1,524 mm), which is 3.5 inches (89 mm) wider than 4 ft 8 1/2 in (1,435 mm) standard gauge, and was laid with 60-pound-per-yard (29.8 kg/m) Welsh iron "pear" rail. Mastering the technique, the track laying crew were putting down six hundred feet of track daily.

The original plans for a line from Sacramento to Folsom and then to Marysville were not fully realized as the funding did not materialize. As constructed, the Sacramento Valley Railroad ran from the Sacramento River levee at Front and "L" Street in present-day Old Sacramento and terminated at Folsom. On February 22, 1856, the first train operated over the entire 22.9-mile (36.9 km) line.

Theodore Judah was the Chief Engineer of the Sacramento Valley Railroad. Judah would later become the Chief Engineer of the Central Pacific Railroad and the chief proponent of the first transcontinental railroad over the Sierra Nevada by way of Dutch Flat.

In August 1865, Central Pacific Railroad bought a controlling interest in the management of Sacramento Valley, diverting the profitable over-mountain Washoe trade and travel, potentially worth several million dollars annually, to the Central Pacific and leaving local trade and travel to Sacramento Valley. Thereafter, the gauge of its track and all its rolling stock was changed to correspond with the standard gauge of the Pacific Railroad.

On April 19, 1877, the Sacramento Valley Railroad was consolidated with the Folsom and Placerville Railroad to form the Sacramento and Placerville Railroad. In 1877 the Placerville and Sacramento Valley Railroad was also deeded to the Sacramento and Placerville Railroad. The new railroad operated over 49.1 miles (79.0 km) of track between Sacramento and Shingle Springs, California.

The railroad eventually came under the control of the Southern Pacific Railroad (SP); first under SP's subsidiary, the Northern Railway in 1888, and then ten years later under the SP on April 14, 1898. The connecting Camino, Placerville and Lake Tahoe Railroad opened in 1904.

== The route as it exists now ==
Today much of the original route still exists and was the former Placerville Branch of the Southern Pacific. The branch was acquired by the Sacramento Placerville Transportation Corridor Joint Powers Authority in 1996. The Placerville Industrial Lead is used by Union Pacific Railroad and extends from UP's Fresno Subdivision to the Aerojet facility just west of Folsom. The SacRT light rail Gold Line parallels the route and uses the right of way between Sacramento and Folsom. The Placerville & Sacramento Valley Railroad, a heritage railroad, operates from Folsom to the El Dorado County line. The El Dorado Western, another heritage railroad, operates from the El Dorado County line to Diamond Springs. El Dorado County has created the El Dorado Trail along the branch from White Rock to Placerville, where it continues along the former Camino, Placerville and Lake Tahoe Railroad route.

Most of SVRR's planned route was built by subsequent railroad companies after 1869. A notable historic section is still in operation today as Niles Canyon Railway that linked Sacramento to the San Francisco Bay Area through Niles, California.

== See also ==
- History of rail transportation in California
- California Central Railroad
