= Michael Raffetto =

American radio actor (1899–1990)

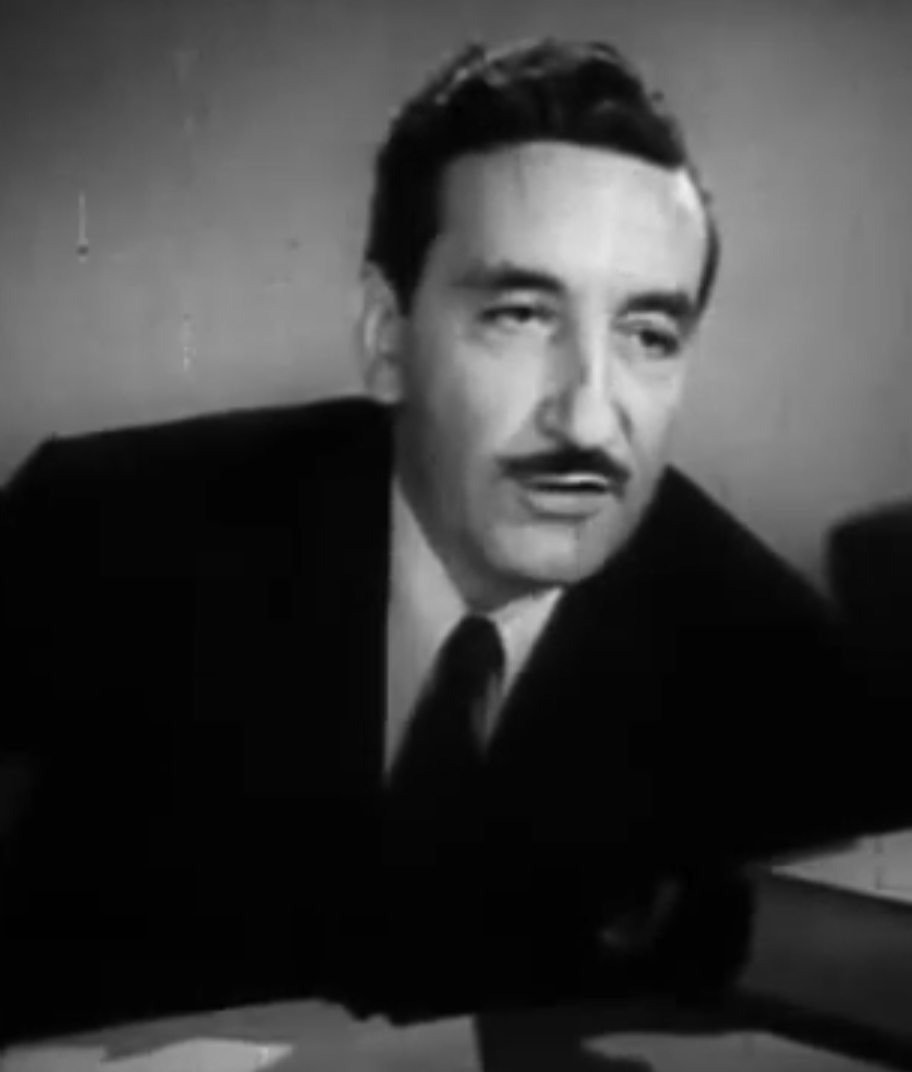
- Raffetto in Today I Hang (1942)
- Born: Elwyn Creighton Raffetto; December 31, 1899; Placerville, California, U.S.
- Died: May 31, 1990 (aged 90); Berkeley, California, U.S.
- Other names: Mike Raffetto
- Education: BA, JD
- Alma mater: University of California Berkeley, Boalt Hall
- Occupation: Actor
- Years active: 1928–1961
- Employer: NBC Radio
- Known for: Radio actor
- Notable work: One Man's Family, I Love a Mystery
- Spouse: Constance Murray Raffetto (2)
- Children: 4
- Relatives: John Augustus Raffetto (father), Lloyd Raffetto (brother), John Augustus Raffetto Jr. (brother), Alexander Howison Murray Jr. (brother-in-law)

Michael Raffetto (born Elwyn Creighton Raffetto; December 31, 1899 – May 31, 1990) was an American radio actor who starred as Paul Barbour (1932–1956) in the NBC Radio series One Man's Family and as Jack Packard in I Love a Mystery during the heyday of radio in the 1930s and 1940s.

== Early life ==
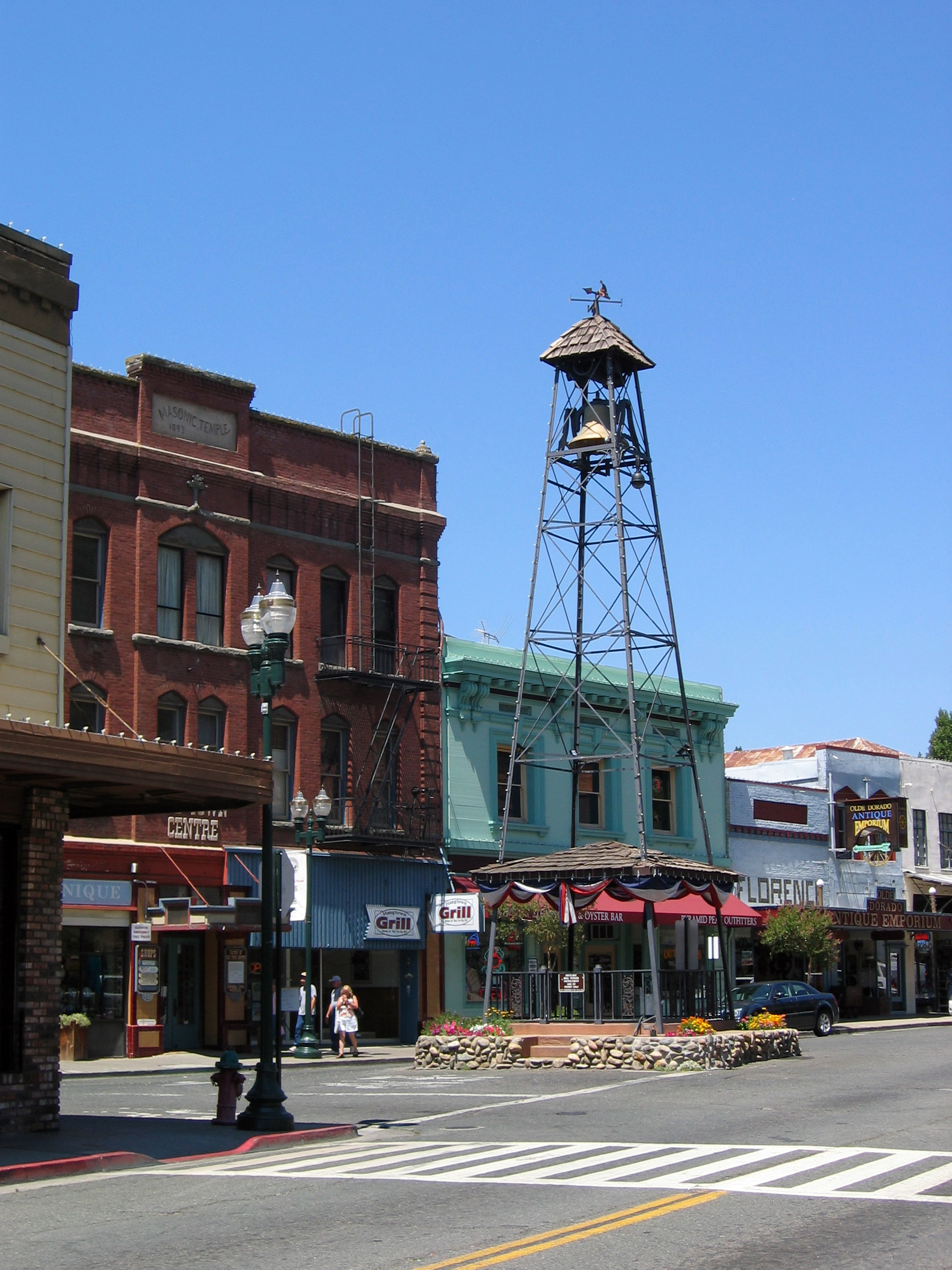
Bell Tower in Placerville, California, where Raffetto grew up

Elwyn Creighton Raffetto was born in Placerville, California, the son of John Augustus Raffetto, a hotelier, and Adela Creighton. (His grandparents, Domenico Raffetto and Anna Pensa, came first to nearby Newtown, California, from Ognio, a mountain village northeast of Genoa.) He graduated cum laude from the University of California at Berkeley's Boalt Hall in 1925. He practiced law in San Francisco until 1928, when he directed drama at Berkeley as well as Los Angeles' Greek Theatre

== Career ==
Raffetto pitched a program concept to NBC Radio's Tom Hutchinson in San Francisco. He went on to star, direct, and produce the show, called Arm of the Law. Soon after, he became the network's West Coast program director through 1933. During that time, he produced Death Valley Days (1930).

In 1946, he also directed Michael Shayne, Private Detective.

== Acting ==
Although he approached radio through programming, directing, and producing, Raffetto's career took off in acting.

=== One Man's Family ===
In 1932, writer Carlton E. Morse, with whom Raffetto had already collaborated, created One Man's Family. Raffetto landed the lead role as the family's eldest son, Paul Barbour, a fighter pilot wounded in World War I. John Dunning, a detective fiction and nonfiction author, wrote, "Raffetto brought to Paul a deep-voiced aura of strength, tenderness, and intelligence." NBC Radio first broadcast the show on April 29, 1932. Raffetto stayed with the show through 1956 (and the show ended on May 8, 1959). Paul Barbour ended many episodes with the line "That's how it is with the Barbours today."

=== I Love a Mystery ===
In 1939, Morse started I Love a Mystery with three cast members from One Man's Family, including Raffetto as Jack Packard, "a soft-spoken, taciturn hero in the best traditions of the West." Together with characters Doc Long (a "brawling womanizer") and Reggie York (a "proper Englishman"), the threesome formed a team of "specialists in adventure."

=== Other ===
"After the first several years," Raffetto often "substituted" for creator Morse, "directing and writing while he was away."

Raffetto also starred in Death Valley Days (1930) and Attorney for the Defense (1944).

== Personal life and death ==
Raffetto's second wife was sculptor Constance Murray Raffetto (a "Californio" and brother of Alexander Howison Murray Jr., descended from Eulalia Perez de Guillen Marine).

Raffetto suffered from tuberculosis for much of his life. He had to leave radio twice to recover. Morse often picked him up from the hospital to act. "He'd drive me home, or I'd take the train back to the hospital," Raffetto later said. At times, episodes were broadcast from Raffetto's bedside.

After leaving radio in 1956, Raffetto and his wife lived in Spain and Italy until 1960. During that time, he wrote unpublished works, including a family history.

Raffetto died of throat cancer at his home in Berkeley. At the time of his death, he had four daughters and five grandchildren.

== Acting credits ==
=== Radio ===
Raffetto's radio work lasted from 1930 to 1956 and included:

- Arm of the Law (1930)
- Numb and Dumb (1931?)
- Chinatown Squad (1932)
- One Man's Family (1932-1956) – Paul Barber
- I Love a Mystery (1939-1952) – Jack Packard
- Attorney for the Defense (1944) – Jonathan Brixton (voice sample)
- NBC Parade of the Stars (1946) – Himself
- Saturday's Children (1947) (The Screen Guild Theater – CBS)
- I Love Adventure (1948)
- Behold a Woman (1948) – Narrator
- Families Need Parents (undated)

=== Film ===
Raffetto acted in small roles as early as the silent film era in films like Tillie's Punctured Romance starring W. C. Fields. He continued to act in the 1940s and 1950s, including major films like A Foreign Affair (1948) with Marlene Dietrich and Storm Center (1956) with Bette Davis.

Raffetto's film work lasted from 1928 to 1957 and included:

- Tillie's Punctured Romance (1928)
- She's a Sheik (1929)
- Today I Hang (1942) - Roger Lanning
- Eyes of the Underworld (1943) - District Attorney
- Seven Doors to Death (1944) - Captain William Jaffe
- Sunbonnet Sue (1945) - Commentator (voice)
- Pirates of Monterey (1947) - Sergeant Gomara
- To the Ends of the Earth (1948) - Professor Salim (uncredited)
- The Miracle of the Bells (1948) - Harold Tanby (uncredited)
- A Foreign Affair (1948) - Congressman Salvatore
- The Babe Ruth Story (1948) - Customer (uncredited)
- Nancy Goes to Rio (1950) - Purser (uncredited)
- I Was a Shoplifter (1950) - Sherriff Bascom
- Storm Center (1956) - Edgar Greenbaum
- Istanbul (1957) - Priest (uncredited)

=== Television ===
Raffetto's television credits include:

- Medic (1956) - Dr. Franklin McCall
- Telephone Time (1956) - Joe Palermo
- Law of the Plainsman (1960) - Father Robles
- Zane Grey Theater (1960) - Reverend Masters
- Hawaiian Eye (1959-1960) - Papa Haone / Pappa Haone
- This Man Dawson (1960)
- Klondike (1961) - Arnold Jackson (final appearance)

== Writings ==
- He's a Trooper: A Comedy-Drama in 3 Acts (copyrighted but unpublished)

== Images ==
- Photo 1930s
- Photo (2nd from left)
- Caricature Jack Packard (left)
- Photo 1944
- Michael Photo 1947
- Photo 1948 (right)
- Photo undated

== See also ==
- One Man's Family
- I Love a Mystery
- Placerville, California
- John Augustus Raffetto
- Lloyd Raffetto
- John Augustus Raffetto Jr.
- Alexander Howison Murray Jr.
