= Lloyd Raffetto =

American ice cream innovator, entrepreneur, banker from Placerville

- Born: Lloyd Alexander Raffetto; December 27, 1897; Placerville, California
- Died: April 5, 1988 (aged 90); Placerville, California
- Other names: Lloyd A. Raffetto, L.A. Raffetto, Raff
- Education: University of California at Berkeley
- Occupations: Ice cream process inventor, hotel owner, bank co-founder
- Years active: 1920s-1970s
- Employer: Raffles Hotel (owner)
- Known for: co-founding Mother Lode Bank
- Spouse: Ethel Quigley
- Children: 1 son
- Parent(s): John Augustus Raffetto, Adela Isadeen Creighton
- Relatives: Michael Raffetto (brother), John Augustus Raffetto Jr. (brother), Alexander Howison Murray Jr. (brother-in-law)

Lloyd Raffetto also known as Lloyd A. Raffetto, Lloyd Alexander Raffetto, and "Raff" (1897-1988), was a noted Italian-American-Irish-American co-inventor of an ice cream manufacturing process, entrepreneur, and banker who owned the Raffles Hotel (now Carey House) and co-founded the Mother Lode Bank, both of Placerville, California.

== Background ==
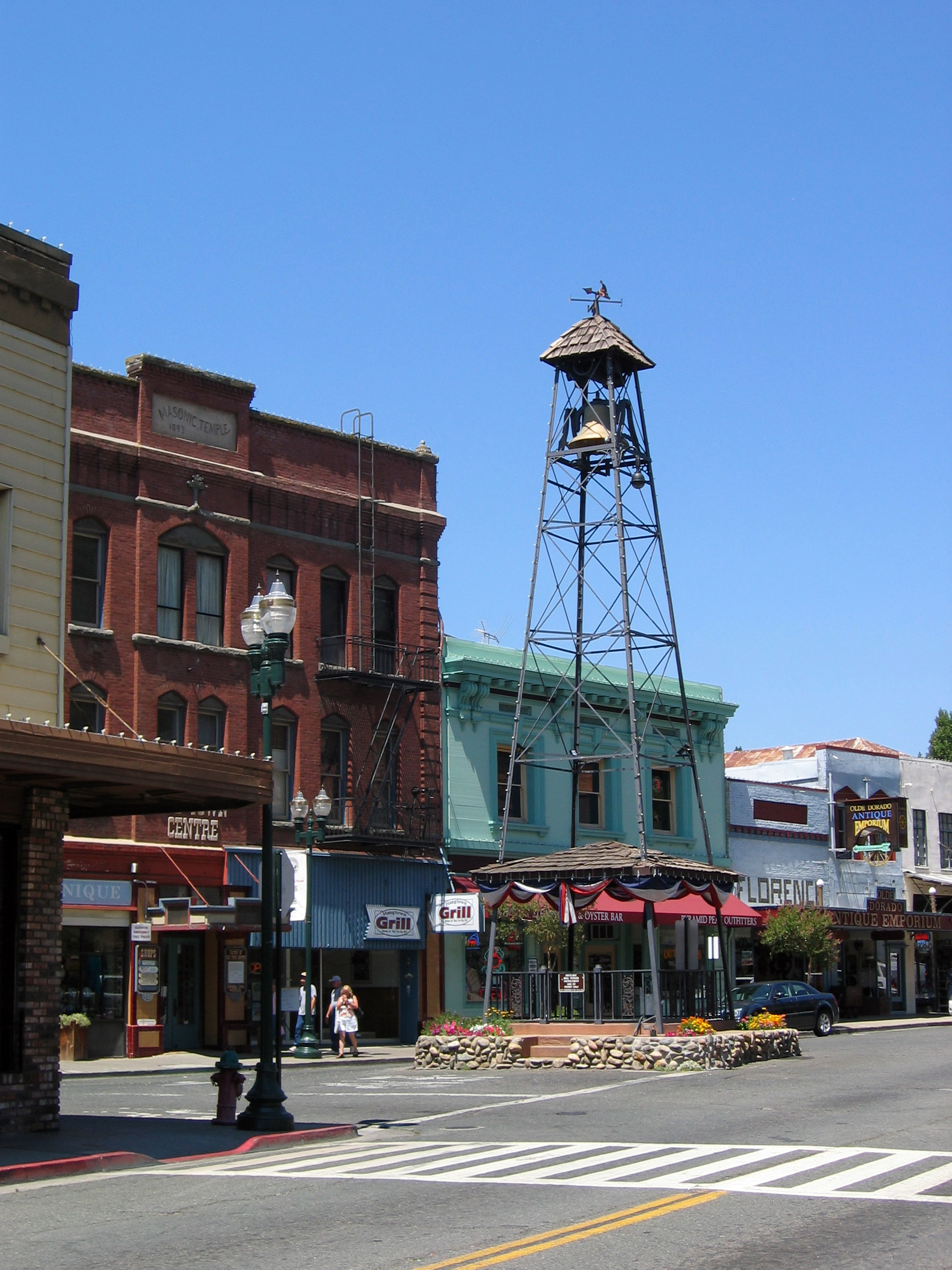
Bell Tower in Placerville, California, where Raffetto lived lifelong

Lloyd Alexander Raffetto was born on December 27, 1897, in Placerville, California. His parents were John Augustus Raffetto Sr. and Adela Creighton Raffetto. He was the eldest of four surviving children, followed by Michael Raffetto, John Augustus Raffetto Jr., and Isadeen Adela Raffetto (future wife of Alexander Howison Murray Jr. He attended El Dorado High School and the University of California, Berkeley, where he was a member of the Pi Kappa Alpha fraternity and manager of the agricultural journal.

== Career ==
=== Raffles Hotel ===
In 1908, Raffetto's father bought the Cary House. In 1915, he demolished and rebuilt it with three stories that had fifty-four rooms (fifteen with baths), coffee shop, and dining room. Raffetto renamed it the Raffles Hotel. It is now again the Cary House.

Historical figures known to have stayed at the hotel include Mark Twain (who used to write for the Mountain Democrat in Placerville), President Ulysses S. Grant and John Studebaker. Hollywood figures, such as actress Bette Davis, have graced the hotel. Most recently, Brooke Shields and Lou Diamond Phillips filmed a movie at the hotel.

In 1928, Raffetto co-authored a book on the manufacture ice cream that substituted powdered milk for real milk.

In 1935, Raffetto became president of the El Dorado County Chamber of Commerce, based in Placerville.

=== Mother Lode Bank ===
Oakland Mayor, Visiting Newspapermen, Other Dignitaries to Sample "Hangtown Fry" Breakfast
"Hangtown Fry," a delectable breakfast dish which had its origins at the Cary House in the early mining days and has since appeared on tables of the nation's leading hotels and restaurants, will be served to members of the visiting press delegation, Oakland's Mayor Clifford Rishell and other dignitaries attending the Wagon Caravan Breakfast at the fair grounds Sunday morning.
Mayor A. H. "Sandy" Murray, who issued invitations to the mayors of Oakland and San Francisco to attend the Caravan festivities this week end, has been assured that Mayor Rishell will be present. Mayor Robinson of San Francisco had an important prior official obligation.
Lloyd Raffetto, owner of the Raffles Hotel, says the story of the origin of Hangtown Fry, though well known here, is worthy of repetition.
A well-heeled miner who has been panning a rich sand bar for several weeks and eating his own sorry cooking came into the Cary House and demanded:
"What is the most expensive meal you serve to a hungry man for breakfast?"
He was told that fresh eggs, then selling for about a dollar apiece and hard to get, was considered the No. 1 breakfast, or that a breakfast of fried oysters might be considered a first line delicacy.
"Well, give me three of four eggs and put in some oysters," the miner said, "And throw in a couple slabs of bacon, too."
The resulting dish was so pleasing that others (presumably those whose pokes were full of dust and nuggets) followed suit, and the recipe became famous.
For guidance of those whose appetites are whetted by reference to the good old days, here is Raff's recipe:

- Saute two or three slices of bacon. Add a few oysters and saute them.
- Add beaten eggs, about three per serving, so that the eggs surround the oysters and cover the bacon. Season to taste.
- Serve by turning the pan's contents out upside down on a serving platter.

The browned bacon will then be on top.

In February 1952, Raffetto was one of several applicants for FDIC membership. In 1953, Raffetto became one of the organizers and long time directors of the Mother Lode Bank (1953-1975), headquartered at 447 Main Street, Placerville. California state senator Swift Berry served as its first president from 1953 to 1962. In 1963, Raffetto was elected president. In 1957, the bank applied to open a branch in Grass Valley, California. The bank continued to expand into the 1970s. On September 19, 1970, it opened another branch in Roseville, California with a ceremony attended by Roseville Mayor Baron Reed, bank branch manager Jerry Zak, assistant branch manager Robert Easter, local employees, and Raffetto. The bank's name appeared often in the local Mountain Democrat newspaper, either for dividend announcements, its business condition, employee news, or sponsorship. The bank became inactive on June 29, 1975, as part of its sale to Security Pacific National Bank (after further acquisitions most recently belonging to FIA Card Services as of 2014).

=== Community ===
In 1938, as a member of the El Dorado Chamber of Commerce's historical committee, Raffetto helped found the El Dorado Historical Society, based in Placerville. In July, the committee asked two score organization to meet the following month to "form a county historical society and... county museum." Other committee members included: Ernest Van Harlingen, Henry Lyon, M. T. Kelly, Joseph Quigley, Don Goodrich, and L. J. Anderson.

As a prominent businessman, in June 1949 Raffetto joined the publisher of the local newspaper and others in a Pacific Gas & Electric tour of the Feather River Project and received special birthday wishes from the newspaper for his 90th birthday.

As a member of the Lions Club, Raffetto helped the local community deal with issues such as water management.

== Personal life and death ==
Raffetto married Ethel Quigley. They had one son and grandson.

Raffetto was a member of E Clampus Vitus.

Raffetto died age 90 on April 5, 1988.

== Legacy ==
Raffetto was noted for his contributions to the State of California, including the California Legislature Assembly.

Raffetto donated to the El Dorado County Library of Placerville.

Raffetto, known to have "masterminded cooking" at local events, also kept track of local lore, including the origins and recipe for the Placerville recipe for "Hangtown Fry" (see quote box).

== Works ==
- Ice cream; a textbook for student and manufacturer (1928)
  - The ice cream industry (1947)
  - The ice cream industry (1956)

== See also ==
- John Augustus Raffetto
- Michael Raffetto
- John Augustus Raffetto Jr.
- Alexander Howison Murray Jr.
- Swift Berry
- Hangtown fry

== External sources ==
- Recording of Lloyd Raffetto
- CaseLaw Mother Lode Bank v. General Motors Acceptance Corporation
