= John Augustus Raffetto Jr. =

American entrepreneur and banker from Placerville

John Raffetto
- Born: John Augustus Raffetto Jr. September 1, 1908; Placerville, California
- Died: May 21, 1977 (aged 68); Auburn, California
- Other names: John A. Raffetto, John Augustus Raffetto
- Education: University of California at Berkeley
- Occupations: Hotel owner, bank founder
- Years active: 1920s-1970s
- Employer(s): Ivy House Hotel, Placer National Bank
- Known for: co-founding Placer National Bank
- Spouse: Ellen Williamson
- Children: 2 sons
- Parent(s): John Augustus Raffetto, Adela Isadeen Creighton
- Relatives: Lloyd Raffetto (brother), Michael Raffetto (brother), Alexander Howison Murray Jr. (brother-in-law)

John Augustus Raffetto Jr. also known as John A. Raffetto and John Raffetto, (1908–1977), was an American entrepreneur and banker who owned the Ivy House Hotel of Placerville, California and co-founded the Placer National Bank of Rocklin, California.

== Background ==
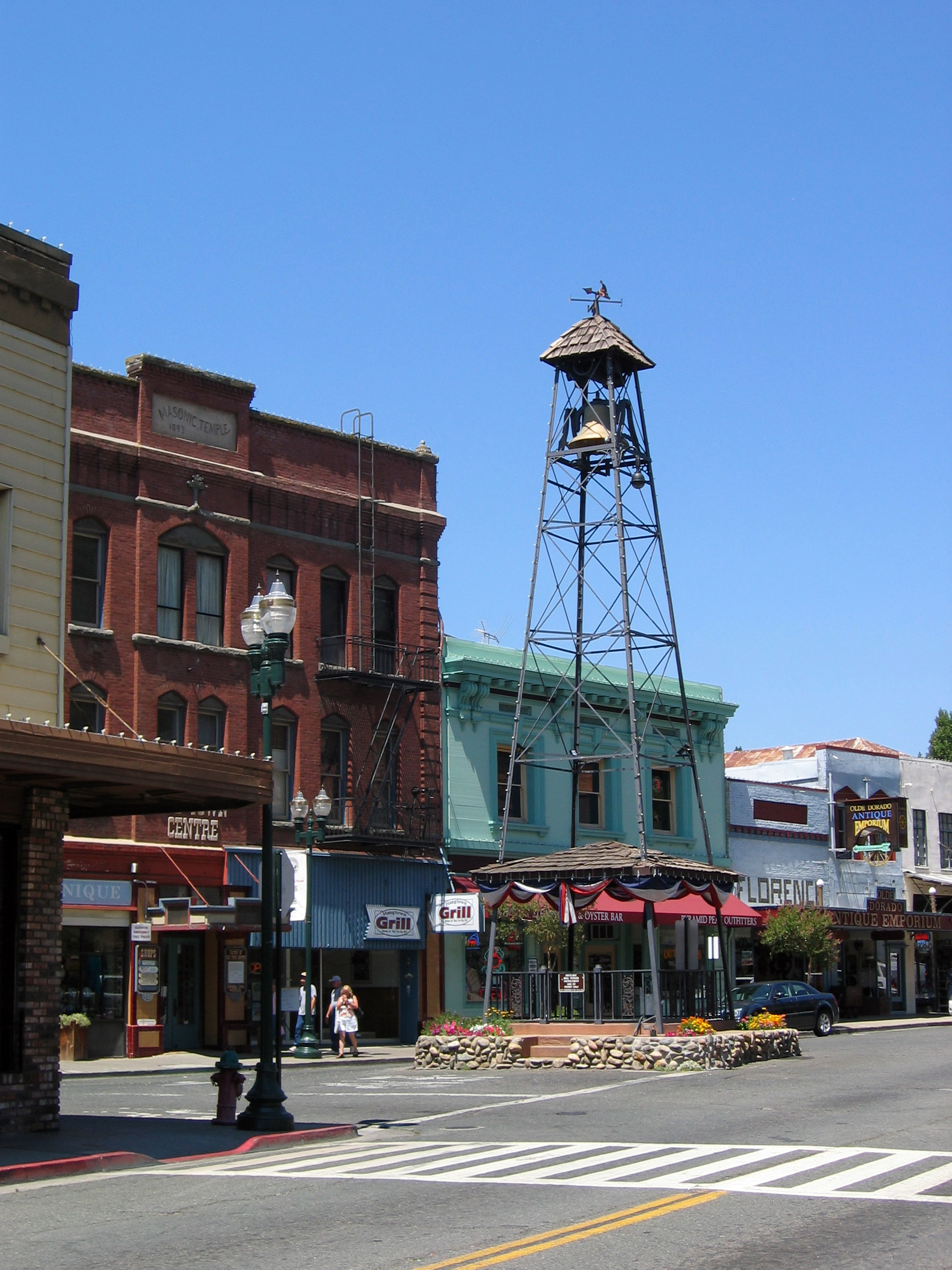
Bell Tower in Placerville, California, where Raffetto was born

John Augustus Raffetto Jr. was born on September 1, 1908, in Placerville, California. His parents were John Augustus Raffetto Sr. and Adela Creighton Raffetto. He was the third son of four surviving children, preceded by Lloyd Raffetto and Michael Raffetto and followed by Isadeen Adela Raffetto (future wife of Alexander Howison Murray Jr.). He attended El Dorado High School and the University of California, Berkeley.

== Career ==
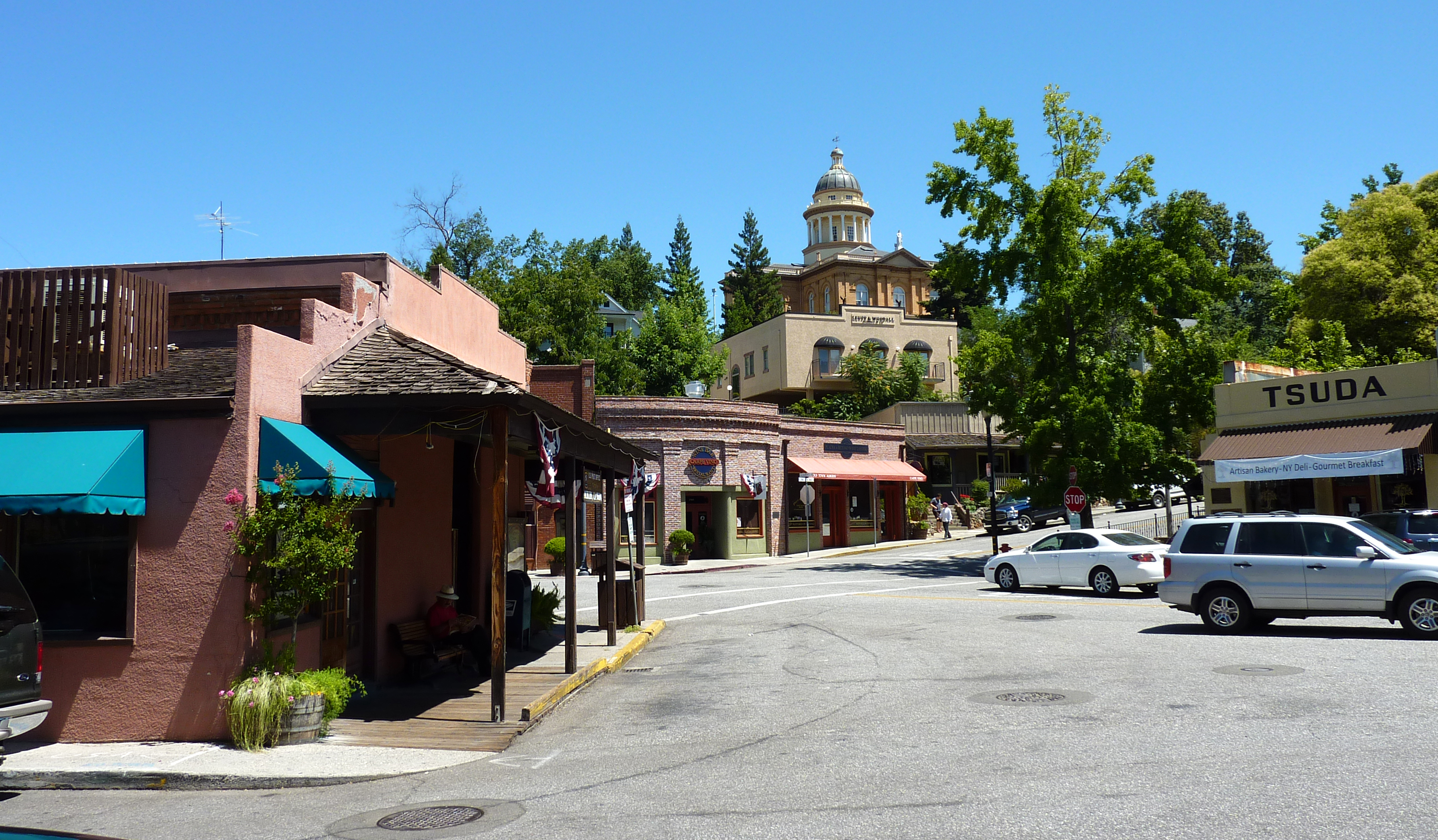
Downtown Auburn, California, where Raffetto set up his biggest business venture

Raffetto was the owner and manager of the Ivy House Hotel in Placerville. In 1942, he became president of the El Dorado County Chamber of Commerce based in Placerville.

He moved to Auburn, California, where he owned and operated the Ivy motel and the Auburn club. In 1968, he served as president of the Rocklin Bank; at that time, he was also manager of the West Coast Capital, a small business investment company headquartered in Auburn, which he helped found.

Raffetto then became a founding director of the Placer National bank. He also served as chairman of the board, president, and chief administrative officer of the Placer National Bank.

== Personal life and death ==
Raffetto married Ellen Williamson; they had two sons.

Raffetto served as "exalted ruler" of the Auburn lodge, BPOE; state president of the Elks; and president of the Auburn Rotary Club. He was a member of the Tahoe club of Auburn, the Sutter club of Sacramento, Native Sons of the Golden West, UC Alumni association, and the Auburn Dam committee.

John Augustus Raffetto Jr. died age 69 on May 21, 1977, in Auburn, California.

== See also ==
- John Augustus Raffetto
- Lloyd Raffetto
- Michael Raffetto
- Alexander Howison Murray Jr.

== External sources ==
- Find a Grave
