= John Augustus Raffetto =

American hotelier of Placerville

John Augustus Raffetto, Sr.
- Born: John Augustus Raffetto; March 1, 1864; Newtown, California, US
- Died: October 11, 1954 (aged 90); Auburn, California, US
- Other names: John Raffetto, Giovanni Raffetto
- Occupations: hotelier, banker
- Years active: c. 1885 – 1930
- Employer(s): Ivy House, Cary House, First National Bank of Placerville
- Known for: hotels
- Spouse: Adela Isadeen Creighton Raffetto
- Children: Lloyd Alexander Raffetto, Michael Raffetto, John Augustus Raffetto Jr., Isadeen Adela Raffetto Murray
- Parent(s): Domenico Raffetto, Anna Pensa

John Augustus Raffetto, Sr. (March 1, 1864 – October 11, 1954) was an Italian-American businessman who founded the First National Bank of Placerville and ran the Ivy House and Cary House hotels.

== Background ==
John Augustus Raffetto Sr. was born in Newtown, California, to Domenico Raffetto and Anna Pensa, both of Ognio, a mountain village northeast of Genoa, Italy. His father arrived in California "by way of the Isthmus of Panama in 1859, and the mother joined him later... They were among the most substantial of the early California pioneers." His parents were subsistence farmers in Newtown, whose only income was sale of firewood to the Arcade Bakery in downtown Placerville.

== Career ==
In his youth, Raffetto walked more than 60 miles one way to farm during summers in Genoa, Nevada; he would earn $60 a summer. He became a miner and earned $1.50 per day.

=== Ivy House Hotel ===
On February 4, 1895, Raffetto and a friend named Potts saved up enough money to buy the Conklin Academy in Placerville, which they turned into the Ivy House Hotel. In 1890, he bought out his partner and became sole proprietor. The Ivy House had fifty rooms and dining hall. The Ivy House was board for miners, serving them breakfast, lunch, and dinner. Eventually, son John Augustus Raffetto Jr. ran the Ivy House as well as a new Ivy Motel next door. Later, the Ivy House became the Placerville Academy, one of the first boarding schools in the state. During the 1950s, the City of Placerville tore down the hotel to make parking lots.

In 1908 (or 1911), Raffetto bought the Cary House. In 1915, he demolished and rebuilt it with three stories that had fifty-four rooms (fifteen with baths), coffee shop, and dining room. His oldest son renamed it the Raffles Hotel. (It is now again the Cary House.)

Historical figures known to have stayed at the hotel include Mark Twain (who used to write for the Mountain Democrat in Placerville), President Ulysses S. Grant and John Studebaker. Hollywood figures, such as actress Bette Davis, have graced the hotel. Most recently, Brooke Shields and Lou Diamond Phillips filmed a movie at the hotel.

Raffetto became a director of the First National Bank of Placerville. In 1917, in the name of the Cary House, Raffetto became one of three founding members of the El Dorado County Chamber of Commerce, based in Placerville.

== Personal ==
On April 22, 1896, Raffetto married Adela Isadeen Creighton (March 30, 1875 – February 9, 1927) of Smithflat, California. They had six children, four of whom survived early childhood, all born in the Ivy House Hotel with only a midwife:

- Lloyd Raffetto (1897–1988): Co-founder of Mother Lode Bank
- Elwyn Creighton Raffetto ("Michael Raffetto") (1899–1990): National radio star in 1930s and 1940s
- John Augustus Raffetto Jr. (1908–1977): Co-founder of Placer National Bank
  - Son Peter Raffetto: former president of River City Bank, Truckee River Bank, Sierra West Bank, Calnet Business Bank
- Isadeen Adela Raffetto Murray (1910–1998): Married Alexander Howison Murray Jr., two-time mayor of Placerville

Raffetto was registered as a member of the Democratic Party (United States) and a member of the Independent Order of Odd Fellows and Native Sons of the Golden West. His name appears in the Proceedings of the Grand Chapter of Royal Arch Masons of the State of California at Its Annual Convocation, where he is listed as one of six first-degree "Mark Masons."

John Augustus Raffetto died age 89 on October 11, 1954, at the home of his third son, John Jr., in Auburn, California.

== See also ==
- Lloyd Raffetto
- Michael Raffetto
- John Augustus Raffetto Jr.
- Alexander Howison Murray Jr.
- Placerville, California
- Newtown, California
