= Michigan-California Lumber Company =

20th-century Ponderosa and Sugar pine logging operation in the Sierra Nevada

- Industry: Logging and locomotives
- Defunct: 2022
- Fate: Acquired by New Forests
- Area served: Sierra Nevada

The Michigan-California Lumber Company was an early 20th-century Ponderosa and Sugar pine logging operation in the Sierra Nevada. It is best remembered for the Shay locomotives used to move logs to the sawmill.

== American River Land and Lumber Company ==
In 1892, the American River Land and Lumber Company built a sawmill in Folsom, California; and a railroad to bring logs cut at Pino Grande, California, to the South Fork American River upstream of Folsom. A chute was constructed to drop logs from the railroad into the river, where an attempt was made to float the logs down to the lumber mill by log driving. Log driving techniques used in eastern rivers proved unsuitable in the steeper gradients of the American River, and log driving was abandoned about 1899.

== El Dorado Lumber Company ==
El Dorado Lumber Company built a sawmill at Pino Grande in 1901 and used the railroad to move carloads of lumber downhill by gravity. Lumber was initially lowered to the river where it floated downstream to a dam and flume for the Rock Creek Power House. Horses pulled the empty cars uphill for another load of lumber. El Dorado Lumber Company soon built a 3,000-foot (910 m) steam-operated aerial tramway to move lumber 1,200 feet (370 m) above the river from the downhill end of the railroad at North Cable on the north side of the river to South Cable on the south side of the river. A 3-foot (91 cm) narrow-gauge railroad was built 9 miles (14 km) from South Cable to Camino, California crossing three summits with grades as steep as 7 percent. Trestles were built around curves in the mountains and across canyons. The narrow-gauge railroad connected with the standard gauge Camino, Placerville and Lake Tahoe Railroad built from Camino to Placerville, California in 1903.

== Michigan-California Lumber Company ==
El Dorado Lumber Company began a series of reorganizations in 1911, producing the Michigan-California Lumber Company in 1917. Facilities were upgraded in 1928 to eliminate railroad grades greater than 3 percent, convert the aerial tramway from steam to electric power, and modernize the sawmill at Camino. The rebuilt cable supported a cage which could hold a single flatcar of lumber weighing 17 tons. At the peak of operations, narrow gauge rails included 9 miles (14 km) from South Cable to Camino, 9 miles (14 km) from Pino Grande to North Cable, and 15 miles (24 km) from Camp 14 to Pino Grande, plus about 10 miles (16 km) of logging branches. Rail operations were abandoned after a lightning strike on the evening of 15 March 1949 caused a fire destroying the South Cable terminal. The railroad was dismantled beginning in October 1949. Lumber was then hauled by trucks over a route almost twice as long as the railroad and cable system.

In 1965, the company was acquired by the Gonyeas, Pritzkers, Peeks, Blodgetts & John Shelk. The Camino mill was sold to Sierra Pacific Industries in 1994. The Gonyeas acquired the entire company in 2011. New Forests acquired Michigan-California in 2022.

== Narrow gauge locomotives ==
The little locomotives that ran the rails of the Michigan-California Lumber Co. were mostly Shays, small steamers usually weighing around 65,000 pounds, but built to pull the heaviest loads. There were other types of locomotives used, but the Shay was the workhorse of the Michigan-California Lumber Company.

| Number | Builder | Type | Date | Works number | Notes |
|---|---|---|---|---|---|
| 1st #1 | Stearns Manufacturing Company | 2-truck Heisler locomotive | 1898 | 1014 | purchased new; retired 1930; scrapped 1942 |
| 2nd #1 | Lima Locomotive Works | 3-cylinder 3-truck Shay locomotive | 1917 | 2926 | built as Swayne Lumber Company #3; purchased 1942; scrapped 1951 |
| 2 | Lima Locomotive Works | 2-cylinder 2-truck Shay locomotive | 1884 | 122 | built as Rumsey Lumber Company (Michigan) #2; purchased 1901; placed on display at Camino in 1949 Now (2024) on display at Turtle Bay Museum, Redding, CA |
| 1st #3 | Lima Locomotive Works | 3-cylinder 2-truck Shay locomotive | 1886 | 159 | built as D.A. Blodgett (Michigan); purchased 1915; crushed by a falling tree in 1929 and scrapped |
| 2nd #3 | Lima Locomotive Works | 3-cylinder 3-truck Shay locomotive | 1920 | 3078 | built as Swayne Lumber Company #2; purchased 1941; scrapped 1951 |
| 1st #4 | Climax Locomotive Works | 2-truck Climax locomotive | 1902 | 339 | purchased new; scrapped 1942 |
| 2nd #4 | Lima Locomotive Works | 3-cylinder 2-truck Shay locomotive | 1910 | 2369 | built as Truckee Lumber Company #3; purchased 1940; scrapped 1953 |
| 5 | Lima Locomotive Works | 3-cylinder 2-truck Shay locomotive | 1903 | 797 | purchased new; scrapped 1943 |
| 1st #6 | H.K. Porter, Inc. | 0-4-0 Tank locomotive | 1899 | 2049 | built for Issaquah Coal Company (Washington); retired 1915; placed on display at Camino |
| 2nd #6 | Lima Locomotive Works | 3-cylinder 2-truck Shay locomotive | 1911 | 2494 | built as Mountain Copper Company #6; purchased 1934; wrecked and scrapped 1942 |
| 3rd #6 | Lima Locomotive Works | 3-cylinder 3-truck Shay locomotive | 1927 | 3306 | built as Madera Sugar Pine Company #6; purchased 1944; scrapped 1951 |
| 7 | Lima Locomotive Works | 3-cylinder 2-truck Shay locomotive | 1904 | 868 | purchased new; scrapped 1951 |
| 8 | Lima Locomotive Works | 3-cylinder 2-truck Shay locomotive | 1906 | 1628 | purchased new; scrapped 1950 |
| 9 | Lima Locomotive Works | 3-cylinder 2-truck Shay locomotive | 1913 | 2662 | purchased new; scrapped 1950 |
| 10 | Lima Locomotive Works | 3-cylinder 2-truck Shay locomotive | 1914 | 2756 | purchased new; scrapped 1950 |
| 11 | Vulcan Iron Works | 0-4-0 Tank locomotive | 1901 | 244 | built for Waddle & Fitch of Delaware, Indiana; placed on display at Camino |
| 12 | Lima Locomotive Works | 3-cylinder 2-truck Shay locomotive | 1918 | 2960 | built as Mountain Copper Company #10; purchased 1931; scrapped 1950 |
| 14 | Lima Locomotive Works | 3-cylinder 2-truck Shay locomotive | 1909 | 2183 | built as Marsh Lumber Company #3; purchased for parts in 1940 and scrapped about 1948 |
| 15 | Lima Locomotive Works | 3-cylinder 2-truck Shay locomotive | 1923 | 3212 | built as Scanlon Lumber Company #2; purchased 1944; scrapped 1950 |

== Artifacts ==
Shay No. 2, the oldest engine in the Michigan-Cal line, was retired in 1951 and is now resting outside the mill in Camino where narrow gauge railroad buffs visit it often. Today, on the Georgetown Divide, the Canyon Creek Narrow Gauge Railroad Association has planned to resurrect the old Pino Grande narrow gauge railroad that was owned and operated by Michigan-California Lumber Co.

== Sources ==
- Koch, Michael (1971). The Shay Locomotive Titan of the Timber. The World Press.
