= Alexander Howison Murray Jr. =

American mayor of Placerville

Sandy Murray
- Born: Alexander Howison Murray Jr. April 18, 1907; Long Beach, California, U.S.
- Died: October 26, 1993 (aged 86); Frederick, Maryland, U.S.
- Other names: A.H. Murray, A.H. Murray Jr., A.H. "Sandy" Murray
- Education: University of California at Berkeley
- Occupation: 2-time mayor of Placerville
- Years active: 1929-1991
- Notable work: U.S. Route 50 in California and City Council of Placerville (1940s-1970s)
- Spouse: Isadeen Adela Raffetto
- Children: 2
- Parent(s): Alexander Howison Murray Sr., Katharine de la Ossa Kevane
- Relatives: Eulalia Pérez de Guillén Mariné, John Augustus Raffetto, Lloyd Raffetto, Michael Raffetto, John Augustus Raffetto Jr.

Alexander Howison Murray Jr. (1907–1993), known as Sandy Murray, was a two-time mayor of Placerville, California and three-time president of the county's chamber of commerce, who championed regional development, including the building of U.S. Route 50 in California (US 50) and was a regular page-one name in the Placerville Mountain Democrat.

== Background ==
Alexander Howison Murray Jr. was born on April 18, 1907, in Long Beach, California. His parents were Scottish-American Alexander Howison Murray Sr., and Spanish-Irish-American Katharine da la Ossa Kevane. He was also a fifth-generation "Californio" descended from Eulalia Pérez de Guillén Mariné (1766–1878). In 1924, Murray graduated Long Beach High School. He studied economics the University of California, Berkeley (which he reached by boat or train from Long Beach). He graduated a year late in 1930 due to financial pressures brought on by the Great Depression (which started in 1929).

== Career ==
In 1930, Murray took a trip with college friends to Placerville, where he met his future wife, Isadeen Raffetto. He returned to live there (1934–1991).

=== Business ===
In 1929, Murray got a job with Union Oil Company in Barstow, California. In 1934, he moved to his wife's hometown of Placerville, where they bought and ran Murray's stationery store (a landmark business founded by J.C. O'Donnell as a tobacco shop in 1888) at 311 Main Street until 1949. In 1944 during World War II, he joined in the US Navy through 1945; his wife ran the store in his absence. In June 1949, they sold the stationery store to Edward H. Durbin, following Murray's purchase of the El Dorado Distributing company from George Yeager. From 1949 until retirement, he operated El Dorado Distributing, a beverage wholesaling business that introduced into northeastern California and western Nevada the wines of Charles Krug, Robert Mondavi, Paul Masson, and Ernest and Julio Gallo. By 1975, Murray had retired from business.

=== Politics ===
In 1942, Murray became mayor of Placerville for the first time. In April 1946, Murray ran un-opposed for Placerville City Council. In April 1948, he was re-elected to city council. From 1950 to 1952, he served a second term as mayor of Placerville. In 1976, he ran and won a council seat again. Later that year, Murray and fellow councilmen Andy Anderson and Mark Tetrault came under fire from the mayor and other councilmen for leading a 3–2 vote in an amendment to reduce appointive powers of the city manager. Murray was among several councilors recalled in March 1977.

In the late 1940s, Murray led town officials in a successfully campaign to have US 50 constructed through Placerville, which the State of California completed in 1953. "To help draw attention to the highway and promote businesses along it, he helped organize the first 'Forty-Niner' Festival and Wagon Train (or Wagon Caravan) event in 1949," which he supported annually as late as 1962 when he served as "chairman for the annual Highway 50 Snow Ball." He continued to support the highway by serving on the board of the National Highway 50 federation with California Senator Swift Berry as chairman.

In 1975, Murray took out papers to run again for city council. In the late 1980s, Murray was still weighing in on town affairs. In a letter to the editor of the Mountain Democrat dated May 19, 1986, he praised El Dorado County Supervisor Bob Dorr as well as the Mountain Democrat itself over the issue of "toxic polluters."

In another letter dated June 8, 1987, he called on fellow citizens to rally support for a South Fork American River (SOFAR) project. (The South Fork American River is a major tributary of the American River in El Dorado County, California, that drains a watershed on the western slope of the Sierra Nevada east of Sacramento. The river begins in pristine Desolation Wilderness and flows through the Sierra Nevada foothills. The river at Coloma was the site of James Marshall's discovery of gold at Sutter's Mill on January 24, 1848, which started the California Gold Rush.)

=== Community ===
Murray served many years also on the El Dorado County Chamber of Commerce and served as a director, committee chair, and president (elected 1935, 1937 1954).

Murray helped organize local support for the 1960 Winter Olympics at Olympic Valley.

He was also active in the Knights of Columbus, the Placerville Lions Club, and the American Legion Post 119.

== Personal life and death ==
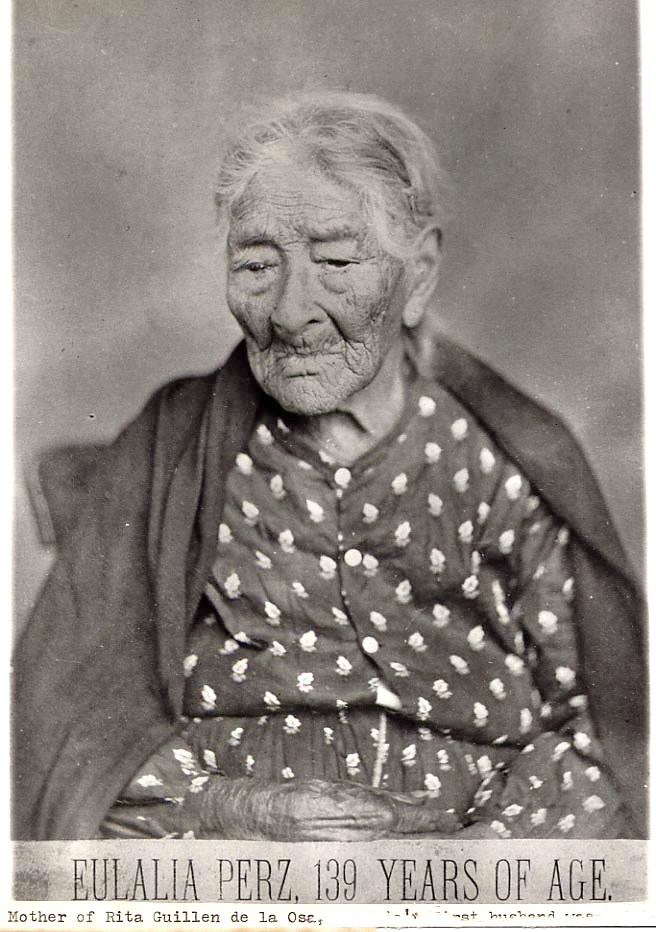
Eulalia Pérez de Guillén Mariné was Murray's third-great-grandmother, making him a fifth-generation Californio.

Murray married third-generation Italian-American Isadeen Adela Raffetto (1910–1998), daughter of John Augustus Raffetto of Placerville, California; they had two daughters.

Murray was bilingual in Spanish and English. "He was a member of the Native Sons of the Golden West and all his life remained interested in American history, particularly that of California's and its transformation with the discovery of oil and the influx of new residents during and after World War II."

By 1949, Murray was a member of E Clampus Vitus of Old Hangtown, of which his father-in-law John Augustus Raffetto was head. In 1955, E Clampus Vitus elected him Noble Grand Humbug. He was also a board member of the local Rod and Gun Club, of which his brother-in-law Lloyd A. Raffetto was a director.

Murray converted from Presbyterianism to Roman Catholicism and spent his last active years as an elder in St. Patrick's Catholic parish of Placerville.

In 1991, Murray and his wife moved East to live near their daughters. "With them goes a wealth of knowledge about the El Dorado County area in the earlv 1900s," noted the Mountain Democrat.

Murray died age 86 on October 26, 1993, in Frederick, Maryland of renal failure.

== Legacy ==
Murray made several notable and long-term contributions to California by championing:

- 1940s: US 50, which, connects West Sacramento from Interstate 80 to the Nevada state line at South Lake Tahoe, still remembered in Placerville with "Wagon Train" celebrations.
- 1950s: Local support for the 1960 Winter Olympics at Squaw Valley
- 1980s: Preservation of the South Fork American River – today "the most popular recreation stream in the West" for whitewater rafting in North America, e.g., 80,000 visitors in 2011.

== See also ==
- Eulalia Perez de Guillen Marine
- Swift Berry
- John Augustus Raffetto
- Lloyd Raffetto
- Michael Raffetto
- John Augustus Raffetto Jr.
