= Pino Grande, California =

Unincorporated community in California, United States

Pino Grande
- Unincorporated community
- Location in California Pino Grande (the United States)
- Coordinates: 38°52′13″N 120°37′34″W
- Country: United States
- State: California
- County: El Dorado
- Elevation: 4,022 ft (1,226 m)

Pino Grande (Spanish for "Large Pine") is an unincorporated community in El Dorado County, California, United States. It is located 8 miles (13 km) north-northwest of Pollock Pines, at an elevation of 4022 feet (1226 m).

== History ==
A post office operated at Pino Grande from 1892 to 1899, with a move in 1893, and from 1902 to 1909. The community's name was also formerly spelt as "Pinogrande".

Pino Grande was the lumber milling area for the Michigan-California Lumber Company. Besides the mill, there were dozens of workers cabins, a hospital, a school, cooks building, machine shops and sheds. The camp was, in itself, a small company town. The narrow-gauge railway the lumber company built served the area for decades. The mill, camp, railroad, tracks, trestles, engines, rolling stock, etc., are now long gone. The area where Pino Grande once stood is within the Eldorado National Forest.

The Pino Grande Railroad traveled along a narrow-gauge track through the Georgetown Divide area. This narrow-gauge railroad hauled vast amounts of Ponderosa and Sugar Pine timber through the rugged terrain of the Divide as well as other parts of El Dorado County.
