= List of U.S. Class II railroads =

In the United States, a Class II railroad, sometimes referred to as a regional railroad, is a railroad company that is not Class I, but still has a substantial amount of traffic or trackage (and is thus not a short line). The Association of American Railroads (AAR) has defined the lower bound as 350 miles (560 km) of track or $40 million in annual operating revenue. (The Class I threshold is $250 million, adjusted for inflation since 1991.). As of 2021, a Class II railroad in the United States has an operating revenue greater than $39.2 million but less than $489.9 million.

== Current Class II railroads ==
Name	Length	References
Alabama and Gulf Coast Railway	292 mi (470 km)	
Alaska Railroad	656 mi (1,056 km)	
Buffalo and Pittsburgh Railroad	658 mi (1,059 km)	
Central Oregon & Pacific Railroad	305 mi (491 km)	
Dakota, Missouri Valley and Western Railroad	502 mi (808 km)	
Evansville Western Railway	124 mi (200 km)	
Florida East Coast Railway	351 mi (565 km)	
Indiana Rail Road	250 mi (400 km)	
Iowa Interstate Railroad	580 mi (930 km)	
New England Central Railroad	345 mi (555 km)	
New York, Susquehanna and Western Railway	439 mi (707 km)	
Paducah and Louisville Railway	280 mi (450 km)	
Portland and Western Railroad	516 mi (830 km)	
Providence and Worcester Railroad	624 mi (1,004 km)	
Rapid City, Pierre and Eastern Railroad	678 mi (1,091 km)	
Red River Valley and Western Railroad	577 mi (929 km)	
Wheeling and Lake Erie Railway	840 mi (1,350 km)	
Wisconsin and Southern Railroad	748 mi (1,204 km)	

== Former Class II railroads ==
- Aberdeen and Rockfish Railroad (reporting mark AR)
- Alabama Great Southern Railroad (AGS), owned by Norfolk Southern Railway
- Atlanta and West Point Railroad (AWP), owned by the Atlantic Coast Line Railroad
- New York, Ontario & Western (NYOW)
- Lehigh and Hudson River Railway (LHR)
- Lehigh and New England Railroad (LNE)
- Bessemer and Lake Erie Railroad (BLE), owned by Canadian National Railway
- Bullfrog Goldfield Railroad (reporting mark BG), incorporated by interests of the Tonopah and Goldfield Railroad, later merged with the Tonopah and Tidewater and the Las Vegas and Tonopah.
- Central of Georgia Railroad (CG), owned by Norfolk Southern Railway
- Central Maine and Quebec Railway (CMQ), owned by Canadian Pacific Railway
- Bangor and Aroostook Railroad (BAR)
- Chicago Central and Pacific Railroad (reporting mark CC)
- Chicago, Missouri and Western Railway (reporting mark CMNW) Split between Southern Pacific and Gateway Western
- Carolina and Northwestern Railway (reporting mark CRN)
- Central Vermont Railway (CV), owned by Canadian National Railway (CN)
- Dakota, Minnesota and Eastern Railroad (DME), owned by Canadian Pacific Railway
- Duluth, Missabe and Iron Range Railway (DMIR), owned by Canadian National Railway
- Detroit and Toledo Shore Line Railroad (DTS)
- Elgin, Joliet and Eastern Railway (EJE), owned by Canadian National Railway
- Fox Valley and Western Ltd. (FVW), owned by Canadian National Railway
- Gateway Western Railway (GWWR), owned by Kansas City Southern Railway
- Georgia Southern and Florida Railway (GSF), owned by Norfolk Southern Railway
- Georgia Railroad and Banking Company (GA) owned by Seaboard Coast Line Railroad (SCL)
- Great Lakes Central Railroad (GLC)
- Gulf and Mississippi Railroad (GMSR)
- I&M Rail Link (IMRL)
- Iowa, Chicago and Eastern Railroad (ICE), owned by Canadian Pacific Railway
- Las Vegas and Tonopah Railroad (reporting mark LV&T)
- Magma Arizona Railroad (reporting mark MAA)
- Minarets and Western Railway (reporting mark M&W)
- Monongahela Railway (reporting mark MGA)
- Montana Rail Link (MRL), until its reintegration into BNSF on January 1, 2024
- Montreal, Maine and Atlantic Railway (MMA) renamed Central Maine and Quebec (CM&Q)
- MidSouth Rail Corporation (MSRC)
- Minneapolis, Northfield and Southern Railway (reporting mark MNS)
- Oklahoma, Kansas and Texas Railroad (reporting mark OKKT)
- Pan Am Railways (PAR), acquired by CSX Transportation
- Richmond, Fredericksburg and Potomac Railroad (RFP)
- Spokane International Railroad (reporting mark SI) owned by Canadian Pacific Kansas City
- Tonopah and Goldfield Railroad (reporting mark T&G)
- Tonopah and Tidewater Railroad (reporting mark T&T)
- Texas Mexican Railway (TM), owned by Kansas City Southern Railway
- Wisconsin Central Ltd. (WC), owned by Canadian National Railway
- Western Railway of Alabama (WofA) owned by the Atlantic Coast Line Railroad which is owned by CSX
