= Mid-Pacific Railroad =

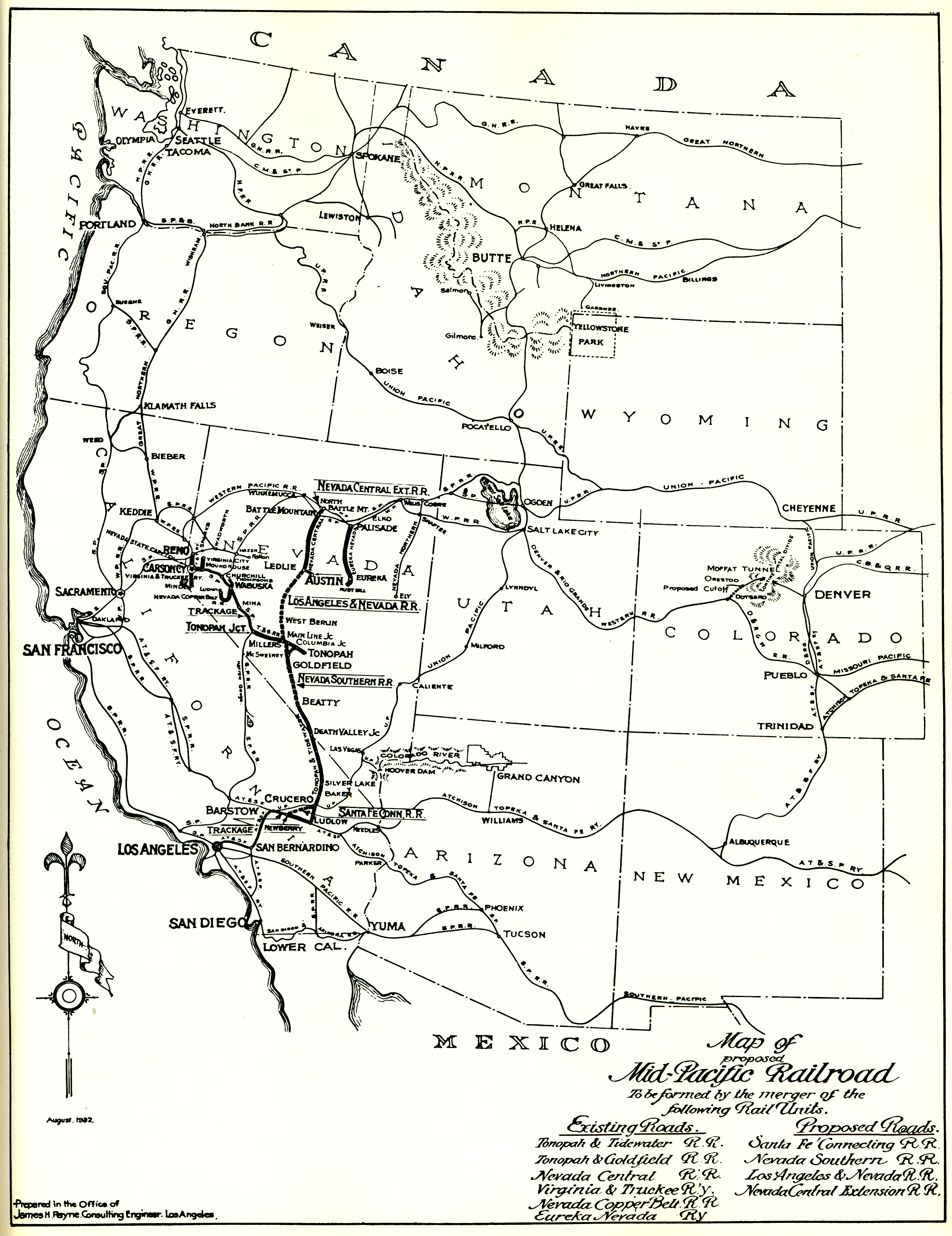

Overview
- Locale: Battle Mountain, Nevada to Barstow, California, with branch line to Reno, Nevada via Tonopah, Nevada
- Predecessor: Tonopah and Tidewater Railroad; Tonopah and Goldfield Railroad; Nevada Central Railroad; Virginia and Truckee Railroad; Eureka and Palisade Railroad; Nevada Copper Belt Railroad

Technical
- Track gauge: 4 ft 8 1/2 in (1,435 mm) standard gauge

The Mid-Pacific Railroad was an idea proposed by Andrew Stevenson in 1929 to build and operate a 1,000-mile-long north-to-south railroad through central and eastern Nevada and southern California.

Had it been built, the railroad would have run from Battle Mountain, Nevada to Barstow, California with a branch line to Reno, Nevada via Tonopah, Nevada, over parts of track belonging to the Atchison, Topeka and Santa Fe Railroad, Southern Pacific Railroad and the Union Pacific Railroad, and over the routes of several shortline and narrow gauge railroads located within Southern California and Nevada, including the Tonopah and Tidewater Railroad, Bullfrog Goldfield Railroad, Las Vegas and Tonopah Railroad, Tonopah and Goldfield Railroad, Nevada Central Railroad, Virginia and Truckee Railroad, Eureka and Palisade Railroad, and the Nevada Copper Belt Railroad, with new railroads built in between to stitch these lines together. It would have cost an estimated $10,658,000 to build.

The plan was put forward in 1932 to a group of men in the Nevada Manhattan Corporation and the railroads involved, described as a way to "bring the Great Northern into Los Angeles." Several of the railroad companies involved expressed interest in the plan, but the project was never completed due to the combined effects of the Great Depression, the abandonment of the gold standard by the United States and Great Britain in 1932, and Stevenson's death in 1933.
