= Maximum temperature =

Maximum temperature may refer to:

- Highest temperature recorded on Earth
- Maximum operating temperature, the highest temperature at which a piece of equipment may safely be operated

== See also ==
- Maximum surface temperature of an asteroid, a physical characteric of an asteroid
- Temperature range (disambiguation)
