= Tonopah =

Tonopah may refer to:

== Places in the United States ==
- Tonopah, Arizona, a community
- Tonopah, Nevada, a community
- Tonopah Basin, in the Great Basin Desert

== Military facilities in the United States ==
- Tonopah Air Force Base, formerly Tonopah Army Air Field in World War II, now Tonopah Airport
- Tonopah Air Force Station, Nevada, a closed radar station
- Tonopah Bombing Range, part of the Nevada Test and Training Range
- Tonopah Test Range, a nuclear test area
- Tonopah Test Range Airport
- USS Tonopah, earlier USS Nevada (BM-8)

== See also ==
- Las Vegas and Tonopah Railroad
- Tonopah and Goldfield Railroad
- Tonopah and Tidewater Railroad
