= Oasis at Death Valley =

Resort in California, US

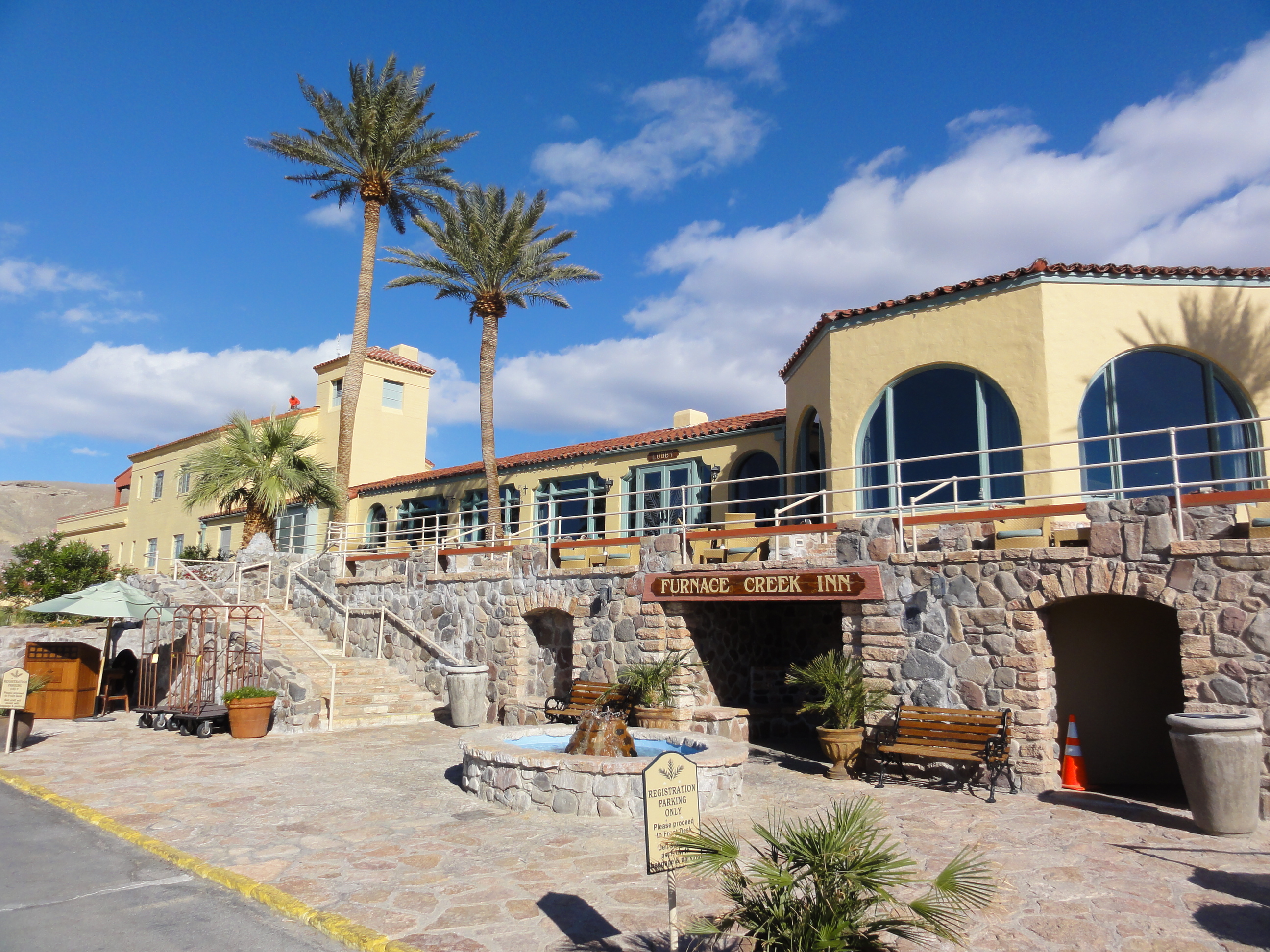
- The Oasis at Death Valley
- Interactive map of the Oasis at Death Valley area

General information
- Coordinates: 36°27′01″N 116°51′08″W
- Opened: February 1, 1927
- Owner: Xanterra Travel Collection

Website
- www.oasisatdeathvalley.com

The Oasis at Death Valley, formerly called Furnace Creek Inn and Ranch Resort, is a luxury resort in Furnace Creek, on private land within the boundaries of California's Death Valley National Park. It is owned and operated by Xanterra Travel Collection.

The Inn at Death Valley is a member of Historic Hotels of America, the official program of the National Trust for Historic Preservation.

== The Inn at Death Valley ==
The Inn at Death Valley, formerly called The Furnace Creek Inn, was originally constructed by the Pacific Coast Borax Company and opened on February 1, 1927, with twelve rooms. Richard C. Baker – then president of Pacific Coast Borax – sought to open Death Valley to tourism in an effort to increase revenue on the Tonopah and Tidewater Railroad originally built by Francis Marion Smith for shipping borax, but in need of new sources of revenue. Twenty additional rooms, as well as a swimming pool and tennis courts were added in the 1930s. The Fred Harvey Company operated the facilities for decades. The Inn now has 66 rooms, located on the hillside, and is open from October through May.

== The Ranch at Death Valley ==
The Ranch at Death Valley, formerly called The Furnace Creek Ranch (36°27′23″N 116°52′07″W), is a separate lodging facility from the Inn. It is on the valley floor next to the Park's Visitor Center.

The ranch is known for being the location of the highest temperature recorded on Earth at 56.7 °C (134.1 °F) on July 10, 1913.

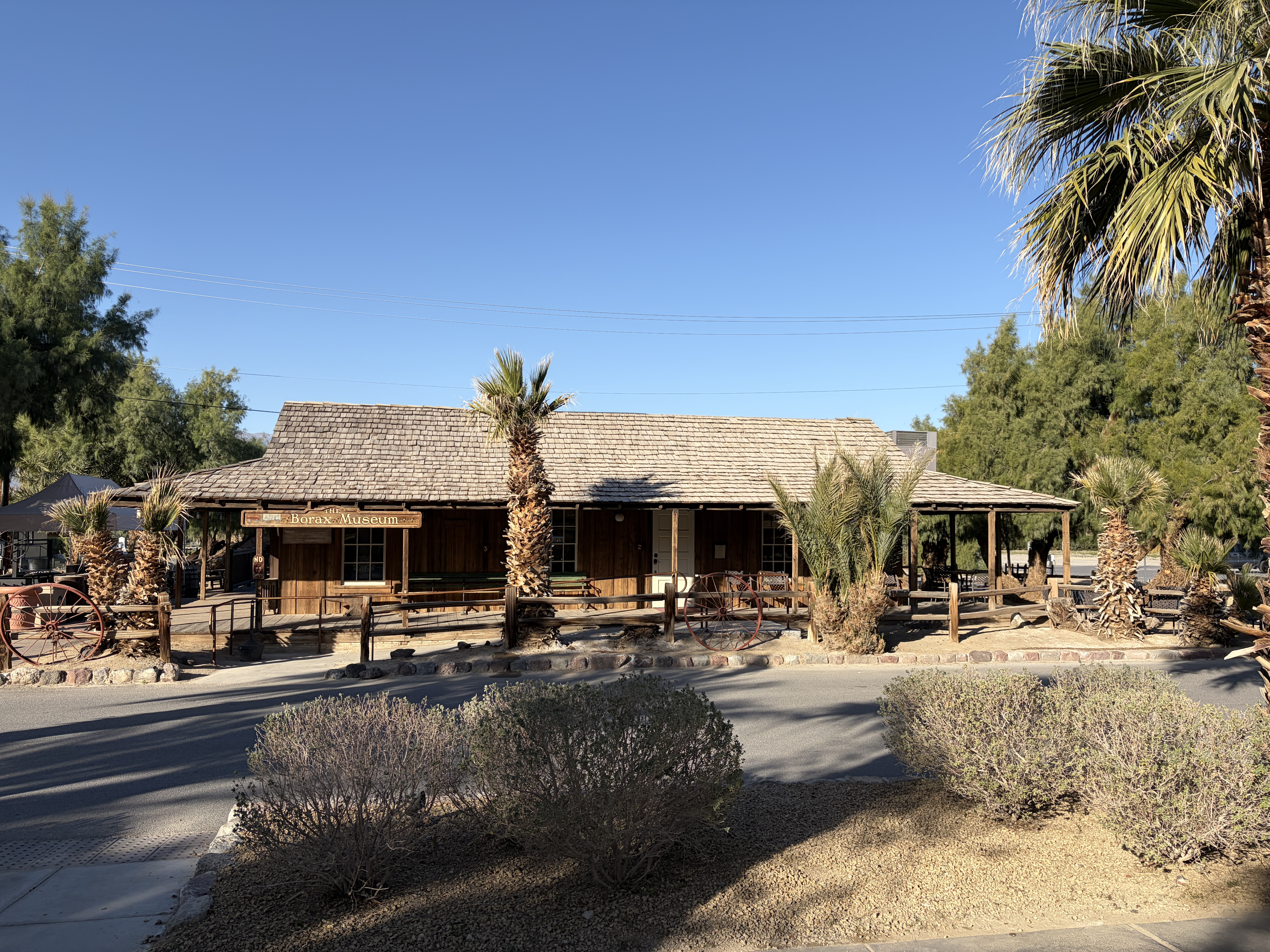
Borax Museum

=== Borax Museum ===
The Borax Museum is located at The Ranch at Death Valley. The museum features borax mining tools and equipment of the Pacific Coast Borax Company, models of twenty-mule team wagon trains, pioneer artifacts and mineral specimens. It was constructed in 1883 by Francis "Borax" Smith, founder of the Pacific Coast Borax Company. It originally stood in 20-Mule Team Canyon where it served as an office, bunk house, and ore-checking station. In 1954 the building was moved to Furnace Creek Ranch to serve as a museum.
