= Gold Center, Nevada =

Ghost town in Nevada, US

Coordinates: 36°52′06″N 116°46′02″W

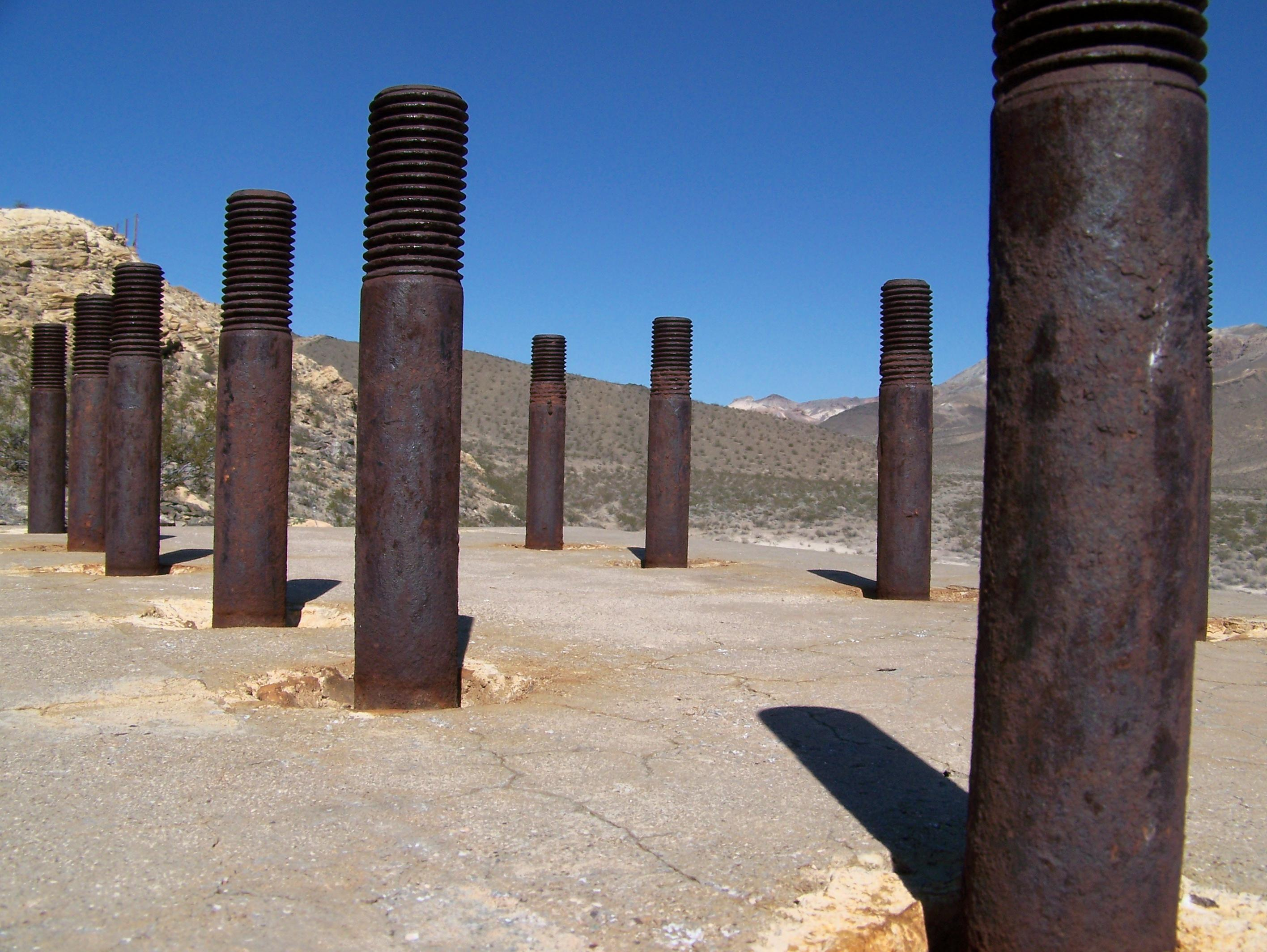
Mill foundation, Gold Center, Nevada

Gold Center was a mining town in Nye County, Nevada. Located in the Bullfrog Mining District south of Tonopah, Gold Center was established in December 1904 with a United States Post Office being authorized on January 21, 1905. The town began publishing its own newspaper in 1907. The location of the town was ideal as it was on the stagecoach route to Rhyolite and Beatty. It was also near the Amargosa River, allowing sufficient water for drinking and for two mills and an ice house. Gold Center also sold water to Rhyolite and Carrara. The Tonopah and Tidewater Railroad, the Las Vegas & Tonopah Railroad and the Bullfrog Goldfield Railroad all ran through Gold Center. Gold Center also had the first brewery in the area which was built underground to maintain a cool temperature.

Today, little remains of the original town other than the foundations of a stamp mill, the footers for a tank at the cyanide plant and sections of the water line that ran between Gold Center and Carrara. It is a ghost town. However, what is left of the town does now sit along the paved road connecting U.S. Highway 95 to Beatty's airport. On January 22, 2011, new life came to the area in the form of Nevada's newest legal bordello when, somewhat appropriately given the area's railway history, a retired short-line railroad owner by the name of Guy Brenkman opened Bikini's Gentlemen's Club off Airport Road in Gold Center.
