= Gerstley, California =

Extinct hamlet in California, U.S.

Coordinates: 36.0336°N 116.2917°W

Gerstley is a former settlement in Inyo County, California, United States.

It was located on the Tonopah and Tidewater Railroad, 4 miles (6.4 km) north of Shoshone.

Gerstley was founded circa 1921, and named in honor of James Gerstley, Sr. (1867-1955) by his business associate Francis Marion Smith, who built the Tonopah and Tidewater Railroad. Together with Richard C. Baker, the three men had formed Borax Consolidated, Ltd. in 1899.

== See also ==
- List of ghost towns in California
