= Crucero, California =

Unincorporated community in California, United States

Crucero
- Ghost town
- Location within the state of California Crucero (the United States)
- Coordinates: 35°02′50″N 116°09′56″W
- Country: United States
- State: California
- County: San Bernardino
- Elevation: 1,020 ft (311 m)
- Time zone: UTC-8 (Pacific (PST))
  - Summer (DST): UTC-7 (PDT)
- ZIP codes: 92309
- Area codes: 442/760
- FIPS code: 06-38058
- GNIS feature ID: 252878

Crucero, California (Spanish for "Crossroads") is a ghost town in San Bernardino County, California. It was located at the junction of the Union Pacific Railroad (originally the Los Angeles and Salt Lake Railroad) and the Tonopah and Tidewater Railroad. Originally named Epsom, it was renamed in 1910 after the Spanish word for crossing. A post office existed at Crucero from 1911 to 1917 and again from 1922 to 1943. The settlement was abandoned after the closure of the Tonopah and Tidewater Railroad.
