= Bakerite =

Borosilicate mineral

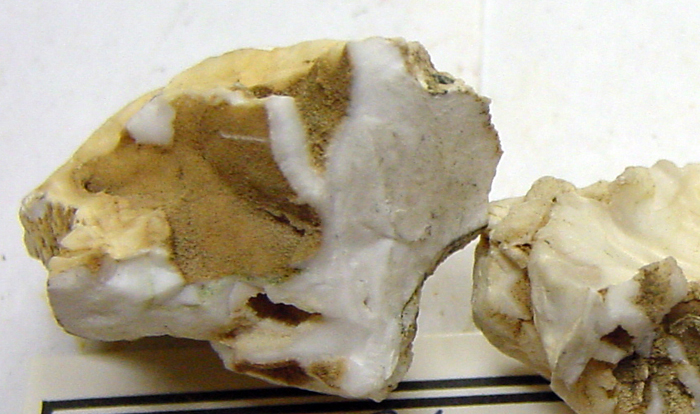
- Bakerite sample

General
- Category: Nesosilicate
- Formula: Ca_{4}B_{4}(BO_{4})(SiO_{4})_{3}(OH)_{3}·H_{2}O
- Strunz classification: 9.AJ.20
- Crystal system: Monoclinic
- Crystal class: Prismatic (2/m) (same H-M symbol)
- Space group: P2_{1}/c
- Unit cell: a = 4.85 Å, b = 7.627 Å, c = 9.659 Å; β = 90.255°; Z = 1

Identification
- Color: Colorless, white
- Mohs scale hardness: 4 1/2
- Luster: Vitreous, dull
- Diaphaneity: Translucent
- Specific gravity: 2.88
- Optical properties: Biaxial (-)
- Refractive index: n_{α} = 1.624 n_{β} = 1.635 n_{γ} = 1.654
- Birefringence: δ = 0.030
- 2V angle: Measured: 87° to 88°

Bakerite is the common name given to hydrated calcium boro-silicate hydroxide, a borosilicate mineral (chemical formula Ca_{4}B_{4}(BO_{4})(SiO_{4})_{3}(OH)_{3}·(H_{2}O)) that occurs in volcanic rocks in the Baker, California area. Discredited mineral: IMA2016-A.

It was first described in 1903 for an occurrence in the Corkscrew Canyon Mine of the Black Mountains, Furnace Creek District, Death Valley National Park, Inyo County, California, US. It was named for Richard C. Baker, a director of the Pacific Coast Borax Company.
