= Extreme cold =

Extreme cold may refer to:

- Extreme cold weather
- Absolute zero, the lowest limit of the thermodynamic temperature scale
- Temperatures used in flash freezing
- Temperatures used in cryogenics

== See also ==
- Freezing
- Lowest temperature recorded on Earth
