= Mitribah =

Weather station in northwest Kuwait

Coordinates: 29°49′N 47°22′E

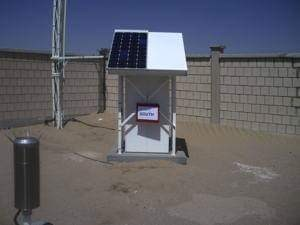

Mitribah is a weather station (40551 in the World Meteorological Organization database) in northwest Kuwait. On July 21, 2016, the temperature at this location hit the second highest temperature ever reliably recorded on Earth at 129.2 °F (54.0 °C). This value was corrected by the World Meteorological Organization to 129 °F (53.9 °C). Not taken into account in the World Meteorological Organization investigation of this record is a wall only meters away from the temperature sensor that can reduce natural ventilation and can potentially heat the air near the sensor. World Meteorological Organization's margin of uncertainty plus or minus 0.18 °F or 0.1 °C only accounted for instrument error.

Climate data for 40551 Mitribah, Kuwait
Month	Jan	Feb	Mar	Apr	May	Jun	Jul	Aug	Sep	Oct	Nov	Dec	Year
Record high °C (°F)	23.0 (73.4)	29.0 (84.2)	37.0 (98.6)	43.0 (109.4)	48.0 (118.4)	52.0 (125.6)	54.0 (129.2)	52.5 (126.5)	47.0 (116.6)	40.0 (104.0)	32.0 (89.6)	27.0 (80.6)	54.0 (129.2)
