= Mesquite Hills =

Low mountain range in the Mojave Desert

- Location within California Location within the United States

Highest point
- Elevation: 1,201 ft (366 m)

Geography
- Country: United States
- State: California
- Region: Mojave Desert
- District(s): Mojave National Preserve, San Bernardino County
- Range coordinates: 35°0′30.945″N 116°9′30.051″W
- Topo map: USGS Crucero Hill

The Mesquite Hills are a low mountain range in the Mojave Desert, in San Bernardino County, southern California.

The hills are protected within the Mojave National Preserve.

== History ==
The Mesquite Hills were on the old route of the Tonopah and Tidewater Railroad, with the line's settlement of Crucero in them.

== See also ==
- Category: Mojave National Preserve
- Category: Mountain ranges of the Mojave Desert
