= Dumont Dunes =

Area of the Mojave Desert containing large sand dunes

Coordinates: 35°41′00″N 116°13′10″W

Dumont Dunes is an area of the Mojave Desert containing large sand dunes, located approximately 31 miles (50 km) north of Baker, California, United States on California State Route 127. Bordered by steep volcanic hills and the slow running Amargosa River, the region is easily recognized from a distance by its distinctive sand dunes. The elevation here varies from 700 feet (210 m) at the river, to over 1,200 feet (370 m) at the top of Competition Hill, the tallest of the dunes.

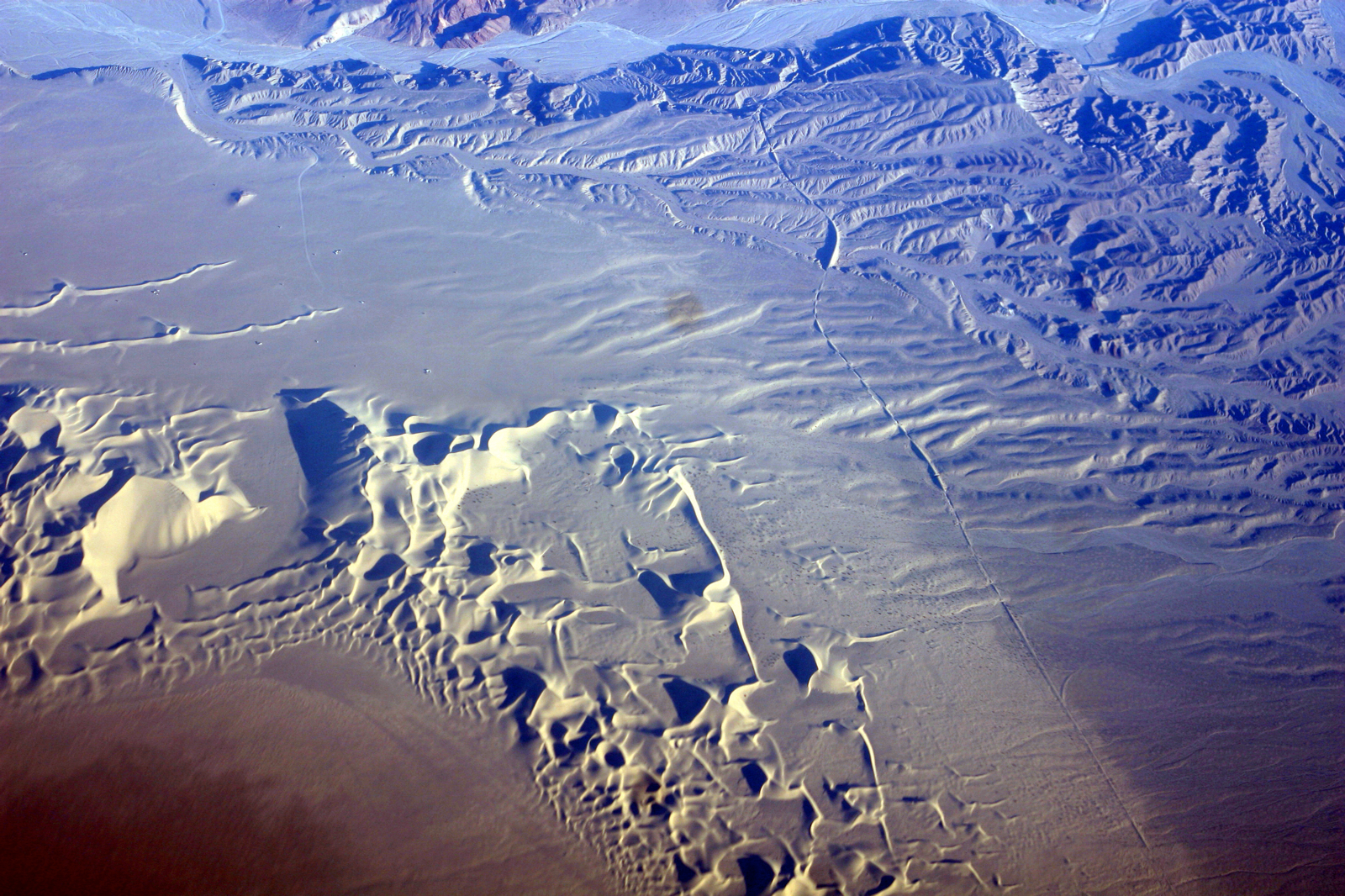
Aerial view of Dumont Dunes

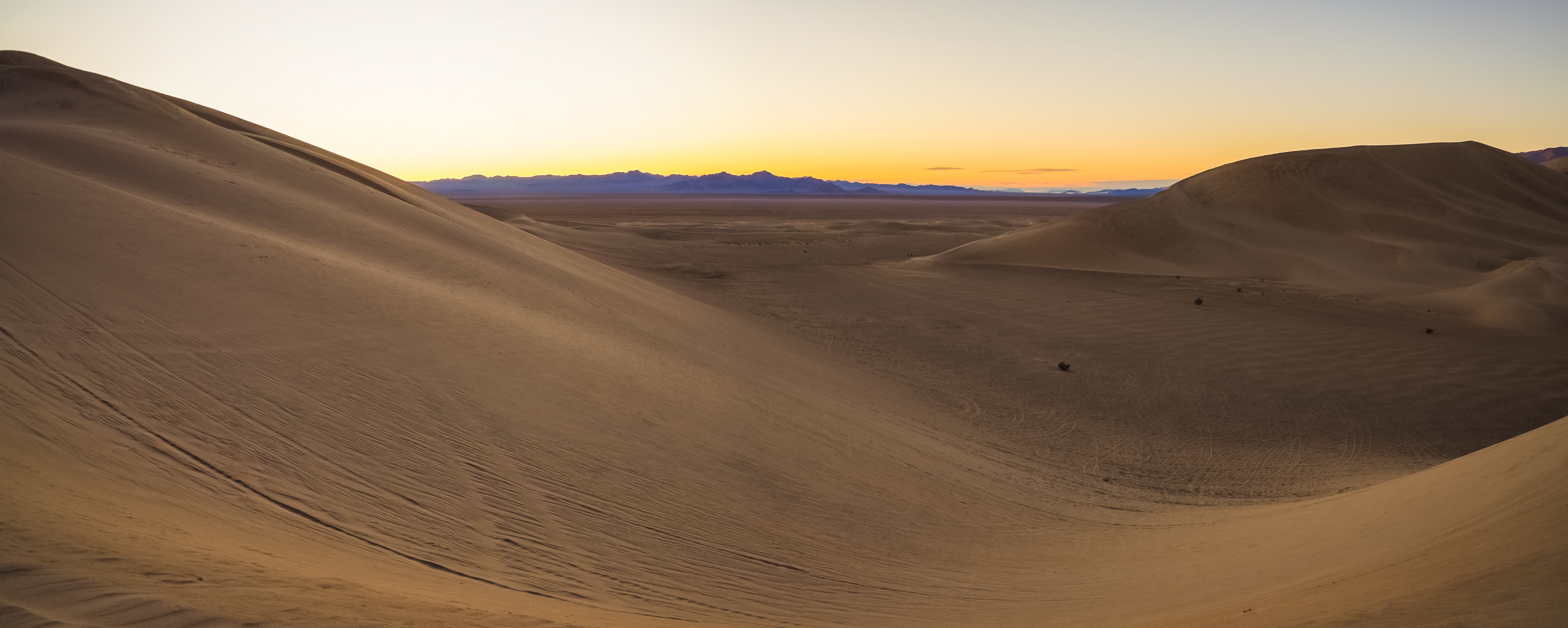
View of the main bowl at Dumont Dunes

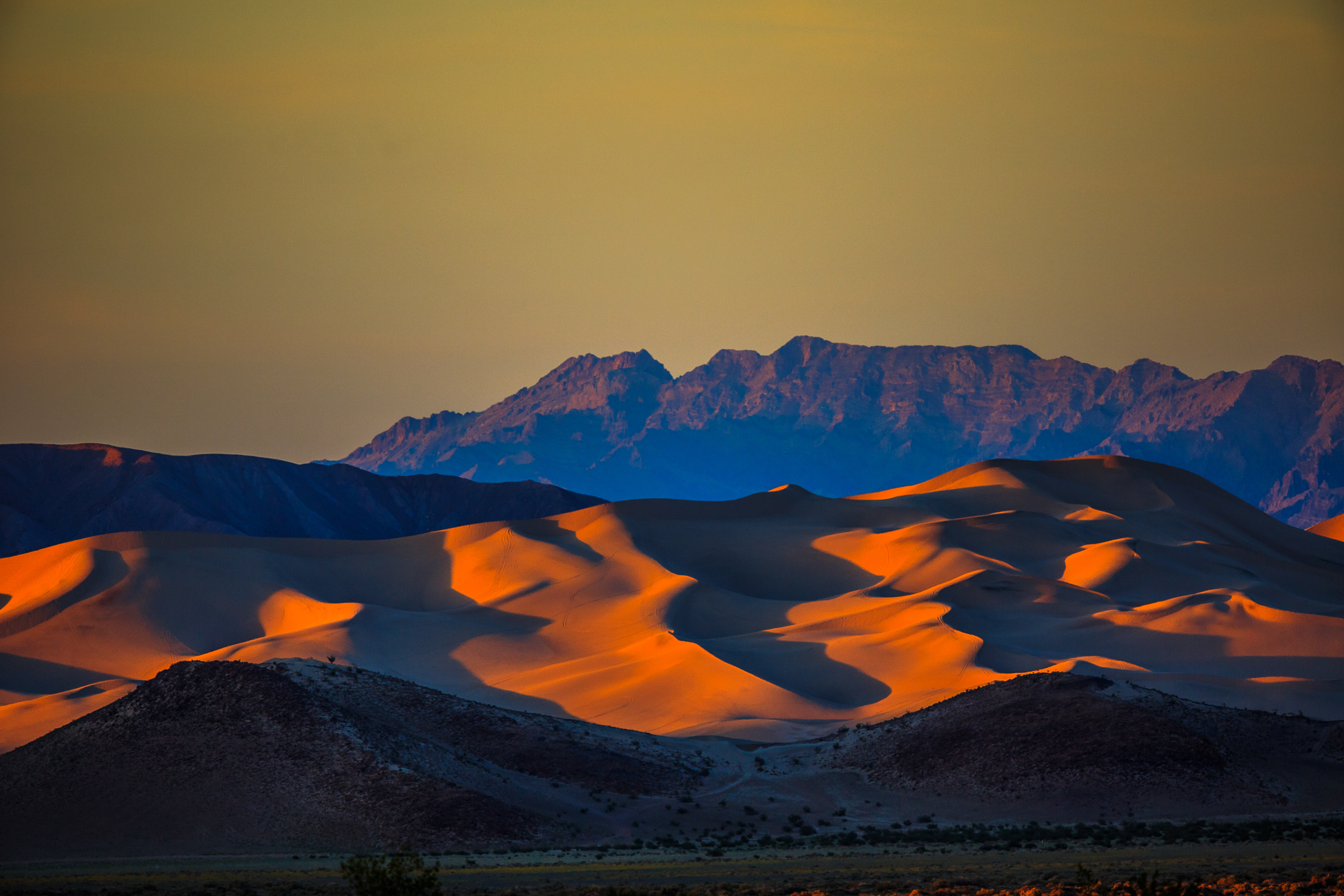
Sundown over the dunes

Most of the dunes are incorporated in the Dumont Dunes Off-Highway Vehicle Area, which is federally administered by the US Bureau of Land Management as a recreational area for off-road vehicle sports, hiking, camping, rock climbing, and rock collecting.

Ground view of Dumont Dunes

== History ==
Dumont Dunes are named after Harry Dumont of the Pacific Coast Borax Company that built the historic Tonopah and Tidewater Railroad, to the east, which was in operation between 1905 and 1940. The vegetation here consists of creosote bush scrub, some annual grasses, and wildflowers in the spring. The low elevation in the area makes for warm to extremely hot conditions in spring and summer.

== Wildlife ==
Wildlife native to Dumont Dunes includes the Mojave fringe-toed lizard, which is under watch by the US Fish and Wildlife Service for possible listing as an endangered species. Such listing could result in restriction or suspension of recreational uses at Dumont Dunes.

== See also ==
- Algodones Dunes—A similar dune formation located 200 miles (320 km) south of Dumont Dunes, in the Sonoran Desert.
