= List of Nevada railroads =

The following railroads operate in the U.S. state of Nevada.

== Current railroads ==
=== Common freight carriers ===
- BNSF Railway (BNSF) (Note: via trackage rights on Union Pacific lines)
- Union Pacific Railroad (UP)

=== Private freight carriers ===
- Nevada Industrial Switch (PGFX)
- Savage Rail (SVGX)

=== Passenger carriers ===
- Amtrak (AMTK): California Zephyr
- Carson & Mills Park Railroad
- Las Vegas Monorail
- Nevada Northern Railway Museum (NN)
- Nevada Southern Railway
- Nevada State Railroad Museum
- Virginia and Truckee Railroad

People movers

- Mandalay Bay Tram
- Hard Rock-Treasure Island Tram

=== Railroad Contractors ===
- Gabriel Willaman Railroad Construction

== Defunct railroads ==
Name	Mark	System (Note: This is one or more of the Class I railroads that the railroad became part of, if any.)	From	To	Successor	Notes
Atchison, Topeka and Santa Fe Railway		ATSF	1906	1923	N/A	
Barnwell and Searchlight Railway		ATSF	1906	1923	California, Arizona and Santa Fe Railway	
Battle Mountain and Lewis Railway			1881	1885	N/A	
BHP Nevada Railroad	BHP		1996	1999	N/A	
Bullfrog Goldfield Railroad			1905	1928	N/A	
Caliente and Pioche Railroad		UP	1906	1909	San Pedro, Los Angeles and Salt Lake Railroad	
Carson and Colorado Railroad		SP	1880	1892	Carson and Colorado Railway	
Carson and Colorado Railway		SP	1892	1905	Nevada and California Railway	
Central Pacific Railroad		SP	1862	1899	Central Pacific Railway	
Central Pacific Railway		SP	1899	1959	Southern Pacific Company	
Deep Creek Railroad		WP	1916	1939	N/A	
Eagle Salt Works Railroad		SP	1903	1910	Southern Pacific Company	
Eureka Nevada Railway			1912	1938	N/A	
Eureka and Palisade Railroad			1873	1902	Eureka and Palisade Railway	
Eureka and Palisade Railway			1902	1910	Eureka Nevada Railway	
Fernley and Lassen Railway		SP	1909	1912	Central Pacific Railway	
Goldfield Railroad			1904	1905	Tonopah and Goldfield Railroad	
Las Vegas and Tonopah Railroad		UP	1905	1918	N/A	
Los Angeles and Salt Lake Railroad	SLR	UP	1916	1987	Union Pacific Railroad	
Nevada Railroad			1906	1907		
Nevada Railway			1878	1879	Nevada Central Railway	
Nevada and California Railroad		SP	1884	1893	Nevada–California–Oregon Railway	
Nevada and California Railway		SP	1905	1912	Central Pacific Railway	
Nevada–California–Oregon Railway		SP	1898	1917	Western Pacific Railroad	
Nevada Central Railroad			1888	1938	N/A	
Nevada Central Railway			1879	1888	Nevada Central Railroad	
Nevada Copper Belt Railroad	NCB		1909	1947	N/A	
Nevada Northern Railway	NN		1905	1983	Northern Nevada Railroad	
Nevada and Oregon Railroad		SP	1880	1884	Nevada and California Railroad	
Nevada Pacific Railway		UP	1889	1889	Oregon Short Line and Utah Northern Railway	
Nevada Short Line Railway			1913	1918	N/A	
Nevada Transportation Company			1912	1938	N/A	
Northern Nevada Railroad	NN		1991	1996	BHP Nevada Railroad	
Oregon Short Line Railroad		UP	1924	1973	N/A	
Oregon Short Line Railroad		UP	1897	1903	San Pedro, Los Angeles and Salt Lake Railroad	
Oregon Short Line and Utah Northern Railway		UP	1889	1897	Oregon Short Line Railroad	
Pioche and Bullionville Railroad			1872	1881	N/A	
Pioche Pacific Railroad			1913	1947	N/A	
Pioche Pacific Transportation Company			1891	1913	Pioche Pacific Railroad	
Ruby Hill Railroad				1893	N/A	
San Pedro, Los Angeles and Salt Lake Railroad		UP	1903	1916	Los Angeles and Salt Lake Railroad	
Silver Peak Railroad			1906	1918	N/A	
Southern Pacific Company	SP	SP	1885	1969	Southern Pacific Transportation Company	
Southern Pacific Transportation Company	SP	SP	1969	1998	Union Pacific Railroad	
Tonopah Railroad			1903	1905	Tonopah and Goldfield Railroad	
Tonopah and Goldfield Railroad			1905	1946	N/A	
Tonopah and Tidewater Railroad			1904	1940	N/A	
Utah, Nevada and California Railroad		UP	1899	1903	San Pedro, Los Angeles and Salt Lake Railroad	
Virginia and Truckee Railroad			1868	1905	Virginia and Truckee Railway	
Virginia and Truckee Railway	V&T		1905	1950	N/A	
Western Nevada Railroad		SP	1879	1880	Nevada and Oregon Railroad	
Western Pacific Railroad	WP	WP	1916	1987	Union Pacific Railroad	
Western Pacific Railway		WP	1903	1916	Western Pacific Railroad	

=== Private ===
- Austin City Railway
- Bluestone Mining and Smelting Company
- Bristol Silver Mines Company
- Carson and Tahoe Lumber and Fluming Company
- Cortez Mines
- Crystal Bay Railroad
- Dayton, Sutro and Carson Valley Railroad
- Eureka Mill Railroad
- Golconda and Adelaide Railroad
- Goldfield Consolidated Milling and Transportation Company
- Goldfield Consolidated Mines Company
- Kennecott Utah Copper Corporation
- Lake Tahoe Narrow Gauge Railroad
- Nevada Massachusetts Company
- Pacific Portland Cement Company
- Prince Consolidated Mining Company
- Quartette Mining Company
- Salmon Creek Railroad
- Sierra Nevada Wood and Lumber Company
- Six Companies, Inc.
- Sutro Tunnel Railroad
- Verdi Lumber Company
- Yellow Pine Mining Company

== See also ==
- Streetcars in Reno
