= Carrara, Nevada =

Coordinates: 36°48′03″N 116°42′44″W

- Ghost town
- Interactive map of Carrara, Nevada
- Country: United States
- State: Nevada
- County: Nye County

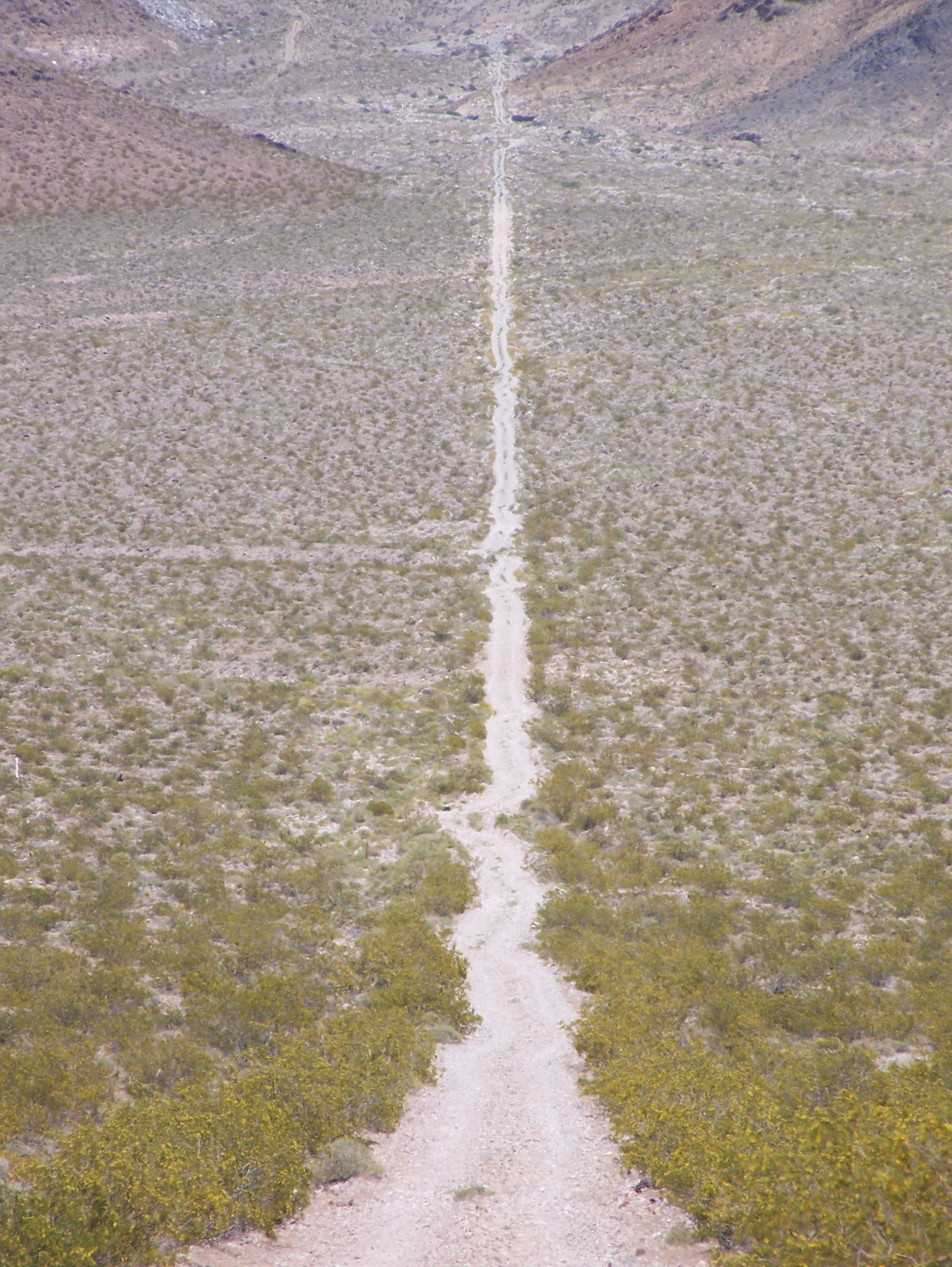
Road from Carrara, Nevada towards the marble quarry in the background.

Carrara is a ghost town in Nye County, Nevada. The townsite is located in the Amargosa Desert adjacent to US Route 95 about 8.5 miles southeast of Beatty. The old Tonopah and Tidewater Railroad line was about one half mile to the southwest. An old road, previously a railroad grade, runs straight for about 3 miles to the northeast up Carrara Canyon on the southeast flank of the Bare Mountains to an old marble quarry. The quarry is about 1400 feet higher in elevation than the townsite.

A post office was established at Carrara in 1913, and remained in operation until 1924. The community was named after the Carrara marble.

The population was 10 in 1940.
