= Temperature range =

Temperature range may refer to:

- Atmospheric temperature
- An aspect of climate classification
- Diurnal temperature variation
- Operating temperature
- Temperature
- Thermal amplitude of the human body
- Thermoregulation
