= Highest temperature recorded on Earth =

Weather record

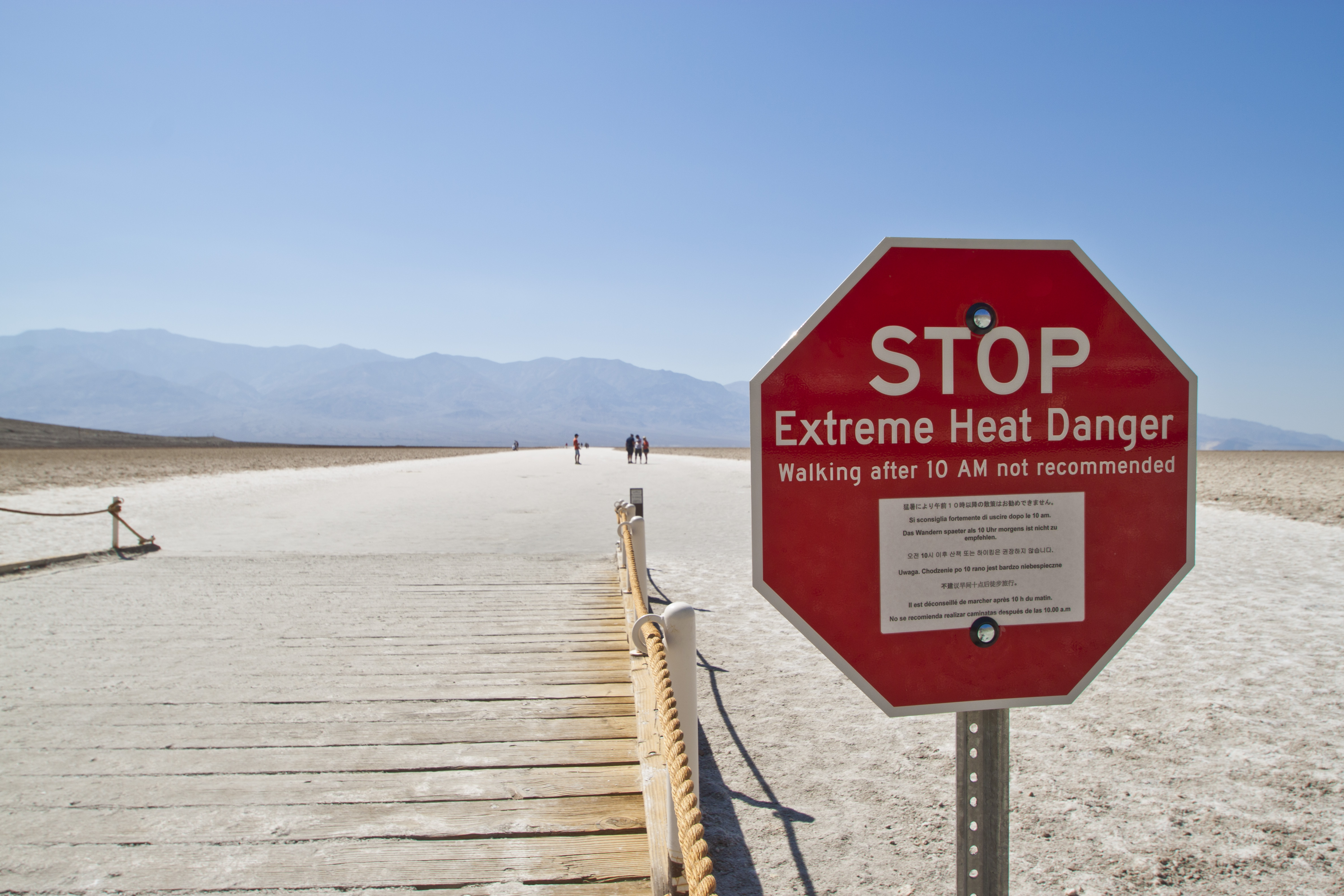
Extreme heat warning sign in Death Valley, California, US

The highest temperature recorded on Earth has been measured in three major ways: air, ground, and via satellite observation. Air measurements are used as the standard measurement because of persistent issues with unreliable ground and satellite readings. Air measurements are considered by the World Meteorological Organization (WMO) and Guinness World Records among others as the standard to be used for determining the official record. The current official highest registered air temperature on Earth is 134.1 °F (56.7 °C), recorded on 10 July 1913 at 14:00 local time, at Furnace Creek Ranch, in Death Valley, Eastern California in the United States.

For about 90 years, a temperature measured in Libya in 1922 held the world record, until it was decertified in 2012 on the basis of a variety of evidences that it was inaccurate. This finding has since raised questions about the legitimacy of the 1913 record measured in Death Valley, with several meteorological experts asserting that there were similar irregularities. The WMO has stood by the record as official pending any future investigative results. If the current record were to be decertified then the holder would be a three-way tie at 54.0 °C (129.2 °F), recorded at Furnace Creek (2013), in Kuwait (2016), and in Mandatory Palestine (1942). (Note: The more recent higher readings of 54.7 °C (130.4 °F) in August 2020 and July 2021, at Furnace Creek have not been verified yet by the WMO.)

== History ==
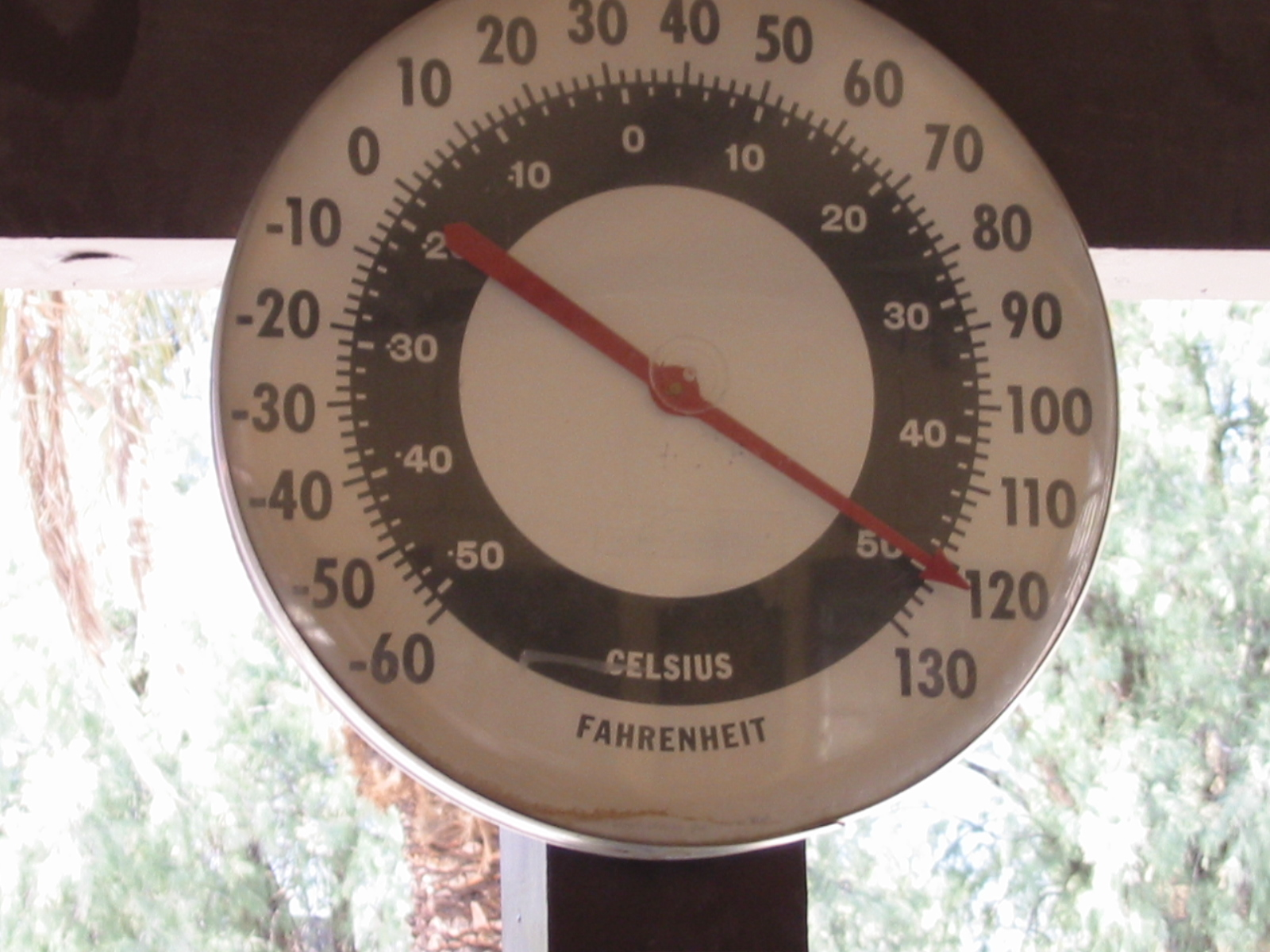
Temperatures often top 49 °C (120 °F) at Death Valley during the summer months.

The standard measuring conditions for temperature are in the air, 1.5 metres (4 ft 11 in) above the ground, and shielded from direct sunlight. Global surface temperatures as a whole have been monitored since the 1880s when record keeping began. According to the World Meteorological Organization (WMO), the highest registered air temperature on Earth was 56.7 °C (134 °F) in Furnace Creek Ranch, California, located in Death Valley in the United States, on 10 July 1913. This record was surpassed by a reading of 57.8 °C (136.0 °F), registered nine years later on 13 September 1922, in ʽAziziya, Libya. Then, after 90 years, this record was decertified, making the former reading in Death Valley the world's highest official temperature again. The decertification of the former record in Libya has since cast doubt on the validity of the 1913 recording.

If the 1913 record were to be decertified, the highest established recorded air temperature on Earth would be 54.0 °C (129.2 °F), also recorded in Death Valley on 20 June 2013, in Mitribah, Kuwait on 21 July 2016 and in Tirat, Palestine on 21 July 1942. There have since been higher readings of 54.4 °C (129.9 °F) in August 2020 and July 2021, both at Furnace Creek, that are pending validation.

Measurements have also been taken in two other ways via ground and satellite readings. Temperatures measured directly on the ground may exceed air temperatures by 30 to 50 °C (54 to 90 °F). The theoretical maximum possible ground surface temperature has been estimated to be between 90 and 100 °C (194 and 212 °F) for dry, darkish soils of low thermal conductivity. While there is no highest confirmed ground temperature, a reading of 93.9 °C (201.0 °F) – the highest ever among unverified claims – was allegedly recorded in Furnace Creek Ranch on 15 July 1972. Temperature measurements via satellite also tend to capture the occurrence of higher records but, due to complications involving the satellite's altitude loss (a side effect of atmospheric friction), these measurements are often considered less reliable than ground-positioned thermometers. Satellite measurements of ground temperature taken between 2003 and 2009, taken with the MODIS infrared spectroradiometer on the Aqua satellite, found a maximum temperature of 70.7 °C (159.3 °F), which was recorded in 2005 in the Lut Desert, Iran. The Lut Desert was also found to have the highest maximum temperature in 5 of the 7 years measured (2004, 2005, 2006, 2007, and 2009). These measurements reflect averages over a large region and so are lower than the maximum point surface temperature.

== Issues ==
In the early 21st century, prior recordings for the highest temperature on Earth were investigated as probable misreadings. From 1922 until 2012, the WMO record for the highest official temperature on Earth was 57.8 °C (136.0 °F), registered on 13 September 1922, in ʽAziziya, Libya. This record was decertified by the WMO in January 2012 after investigation concluded that an inexperienced observer probably misread a new instrument that they had not been trained to interpret. The decertification of this former record led researchers to also investigate the former and current recordings made in Death Valley in 1913. One of the earliest objections came in 1949 by Dr. Arnold Court, who concluded that the temperature may have been the result of a sandstorm that occurred at the time. Court stated that "such a storm may have caused superheated surface materials to hit upon the temperature in the shelter." Modern weather historians such as Christopher C. Burt and William Taylor Reid have also claimed that the 1913 Death Valley reading is "a myth", and is at least 2.2 to 2.8 °C (4 to 5 °F) too high. A 2026 peer-reviewed study published in the Bulletin of the American Meteorological Society concluded that the 1913 reading is about 7.8 °C (14 °F) too high, which would invalidate it as the world record. The WMO has come out in support of the current record, stating that "We accept that Death Valley temperature extreme record. If any new materials on it surface, we will be prepared to open an investigation, but at this time all available evidence points to its legitimacy."

== Unverified claims ==
The following are unverified claims of extreme heat over the current world record of 56.7 °C (134.1 °F). These include historical claims that were never authenticated due to the equipment available at the time and unverified scientific claims. Amateur readings have also been done through social media that claimed occurrences of extreme temperatures which were later discredited. Videos were posted in one instance that allegedly showed street lights melting or trees bursting into flames. These were later disproven by meteorologists who tied the "evidence" to other unrelated prior events that had taken place. All of the recordings listed before 1972 were allegedly caused by a sudden localized increase in air temperature near the surface, known as a heat burst.

Date	Temperature °C/°F	Type	Location	Description
11 July 1909	57.8 °C (136 °F)	Air	Cherokee, Oklahoma (United States)	This incident was recorded at 3:00 am (CT), and reportedly caused crops to desiccate in the area.
6 July 1949	70 °C (158 °F)	Air	Figueira da Foz, Coimbra (Portugal)	Within two minutes, a heat burst reportedly drove the air temperature from 38 °C (100 °F) to 70 °C (158 °F).
15 June 1960	60 °C (140 °F)	Air	Kopperl, Texas (United States)	A heat burst is claimed to have sent the air temperature to near 140 °F (60 °C), causing cotton crops to become desiccated and drying out vegetation. While it is possible the reading may have exceeded 100 °F (38 °C), the thermometers designed to detect temperatures up to 140 °F (60 °C) broke.
6 July 1966	58.5 °C (137.3 °F)	Air	San Luis RC, Sonora (Mexico)	Mexican news agencies according to state archives.
6 July 1966	60 °C (140.0 °F)	Air	Mexicali, BC (Mexico)	An archived note from the Baja California State Meteorologic Agency claims a temperature of 58.5 °C. was recorded at San Luis, Sonora by a local meteorological agency (entry above). During the same day, another measurement was taken in the "El riito" community in Mexicali. This measurement was never completed as the reading stopped at 60 °C due to limitations of the thermometer used.
June 1967	86.7 °C (188.1 °F)	Unknown	Abadan (Iran)	An alleged temperature of 86.7 °C (188.1 °F) was recorded during a heat burst in Abadan, Iran.
15 July 1972	93.9 °C (201.0 °F)	Ground	Oasis at Death Valley (United States)	See "History" section above.
2005	70.7 °C (159.3 °F)	Satellite	Dasht-e Lut (Iran)	See "History" section above.
2008	66.8 °C (152.2 °F)	Satellite	Flaming Mountains (China)	This reading was measured in the Flaming Mountains of China in 2008.
2011	84 °C (183 °F)	Ground	Port Sudan (Sudan)	A ground temperature of 84 °C (183 °F) was reportedly taken in Port Sudan, Sudan.
22 January 2017	57.2 °C (135.0 °F)	Air	Beverly Hills, California; United States	According to the Los Angeles Almanac, 57.2 °C (135.0 °F) was the hottest temperature historically recorded among 20 Los Angeles County weather stations. However, a UCLA weather station less than three miles away recorded nothing close to this extreme claim. The Los Angeles Almanac has since stated "we offer no grounds for challenging these records."
May 2021	80.8 °C (177.4 °F)	Satellite	Dasht-e Lut, (Iran) & Sonoran Desert, (Mexico)	Case studies published in May 2021 by the Bulletin of the American Meteorological Society.

== See also ==
- Desert climate
- Heat wave
- Highest temperatures ever recorded
- Lowest temperature recorded on Earth
- Lowest temperatures ever recorded
- Orders of magnitude (temperature)
