= Bullfrog Goldfield Railroad =

Coordinates: 37.713453°N 117.230278°W

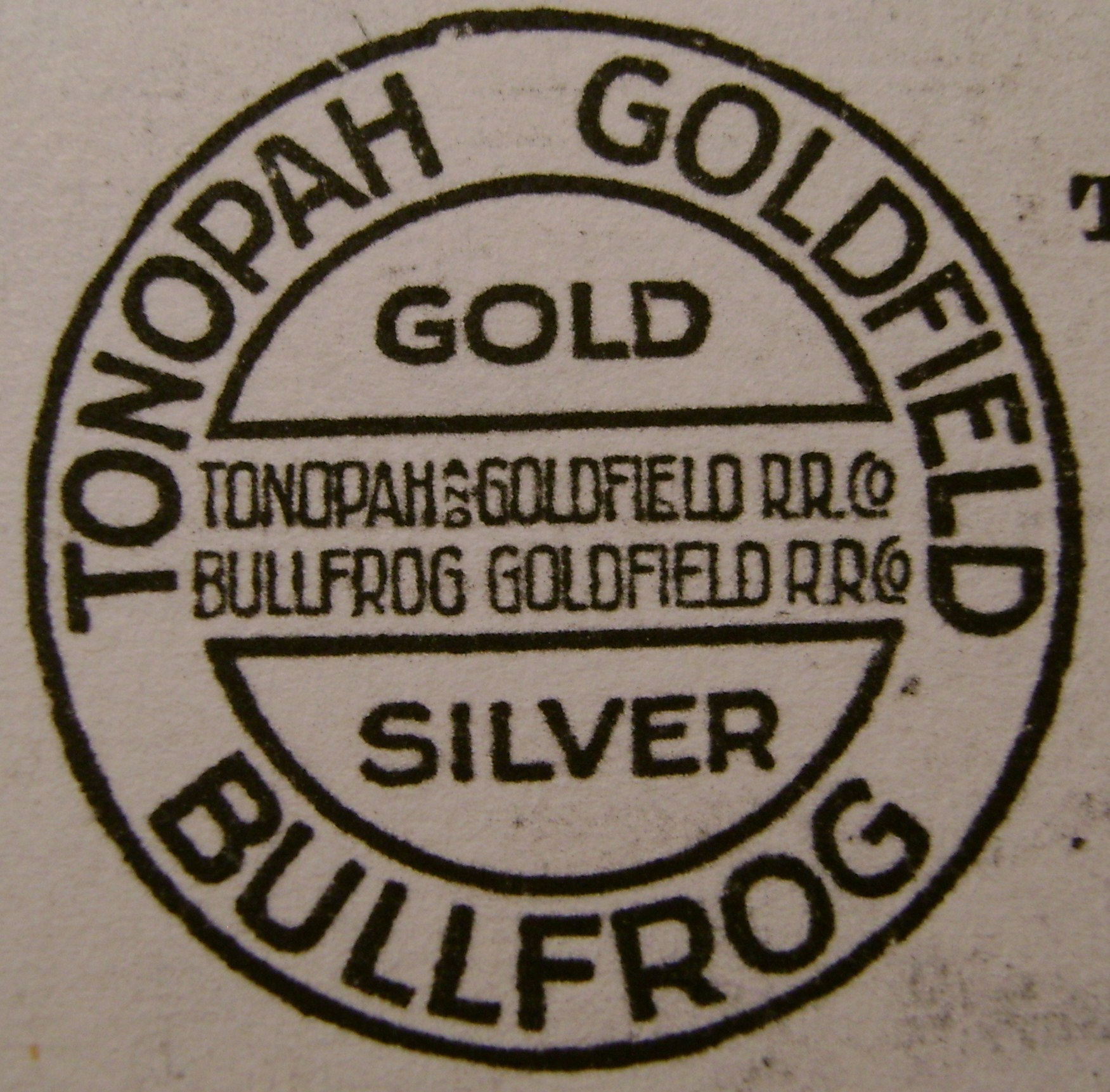

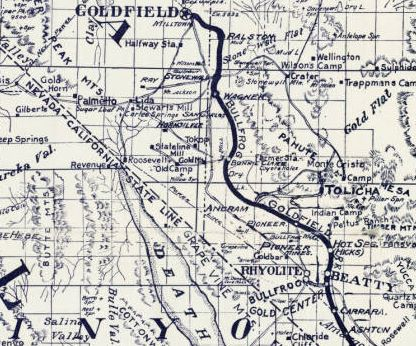
- Map showing the line of the Bullfrog Goldfield Railroad and the Tonopah and Tidewater Railroad, approx. 1907.

Overview
- Headquarters: Los Angeles, California
- Reporting mark: BG; BGRR
- Locale: Goldfield, Nevada to Beatty, Nevada
- Dates of operation: 1905–1928

Technical
- Track gauge: 4 ft 8 1/2 in (1,435 mm) standard gauge

The Bullfrog Goldfield Railroad (BGRR) was a railroad lying just inside and about midway of the southwestern State line of Nevada. It was incorporated in 1905 to provide an outlet from the mining section near Beatty to the north over the lines of the Tonopah and Goldfield Railroad and the Southern Pacific Railroad.

== Track ==
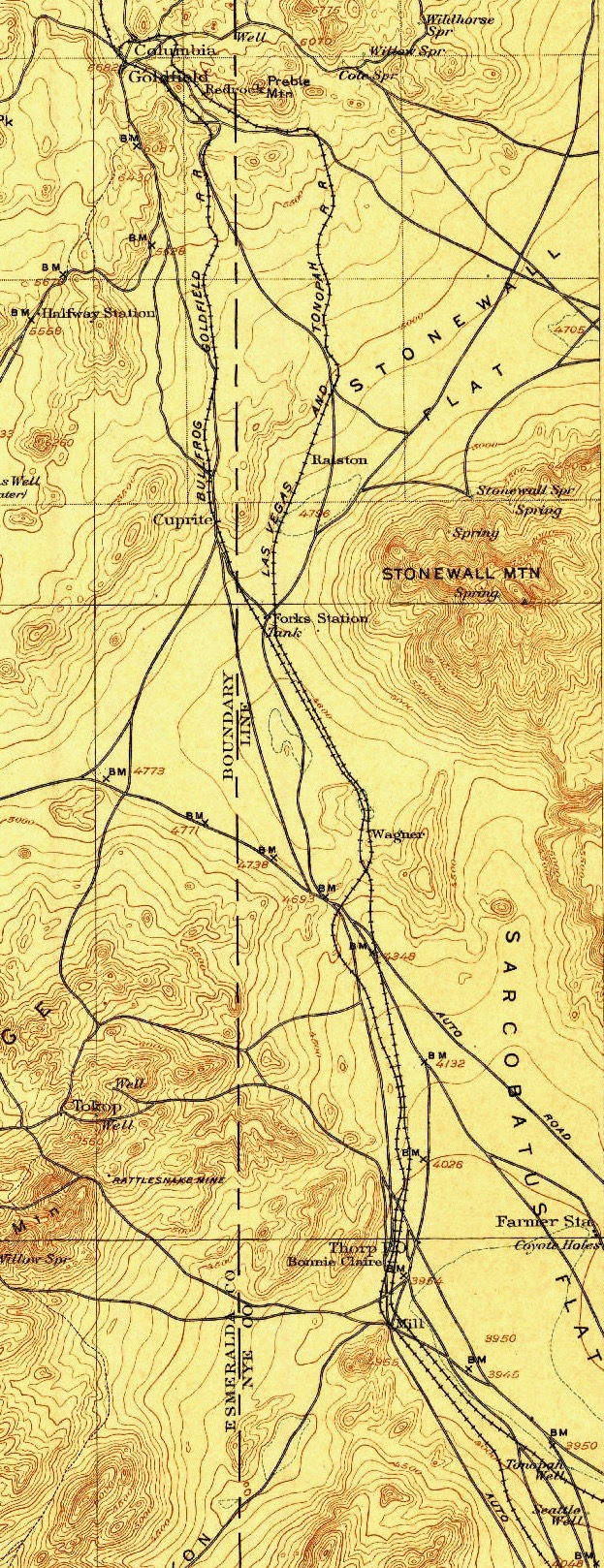
Northern section of the route in 1908

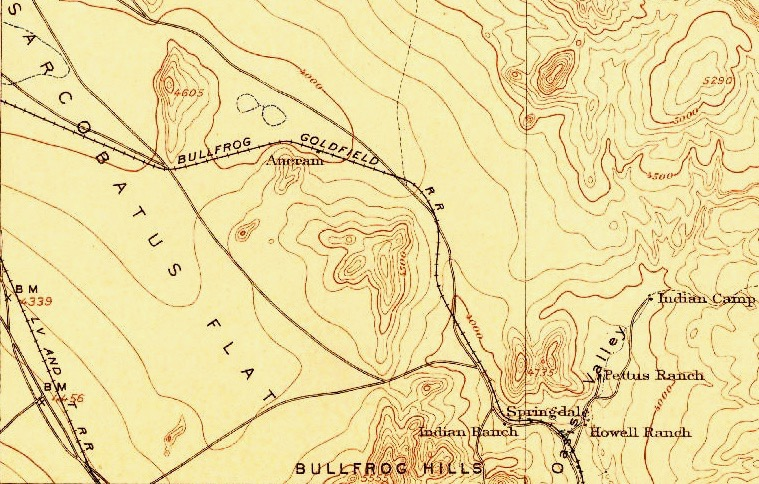
Route in 1908

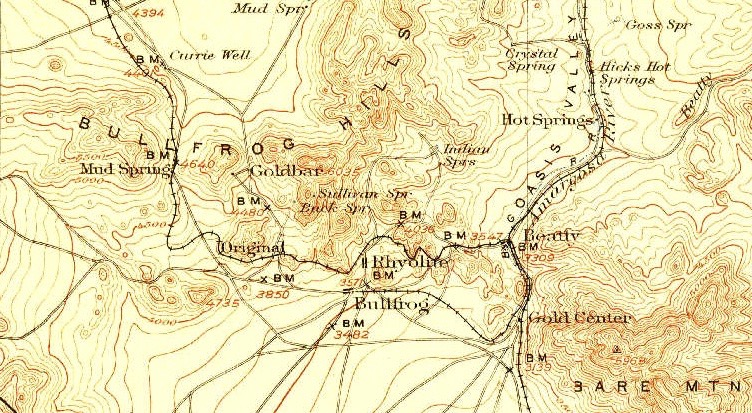
Southern portion of route in 1908

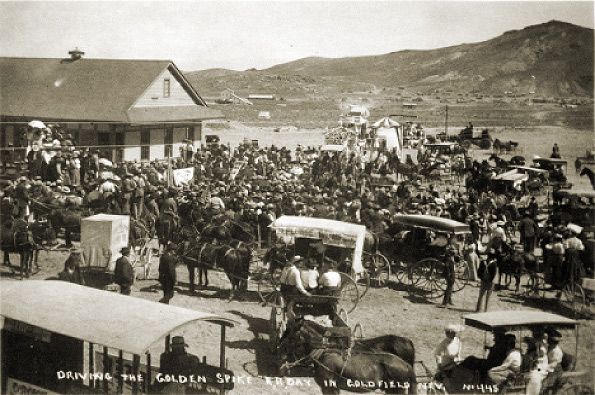
Driving the golden spike at Goldfield, Nevada, c. 1905.

The main line of the Bullfrog Goldfield Railroad Company extended from Beatty 78.95 miles (127.06 km) in a general north-northwesterly direction to Goldfield. A 5.83-mile (9.38 km) long branch line, ran westward from Beatty to Rhyolite. The total road mileage owned was thus 84.78 miles. Yard tracks and sidings to an aggregate of 7.70 miles (12.39 km) brought the total owned mileage to 92.48 miles (148.83 km). The Bullfrog Goldfield Railroad Company owned no terminal facilities, as such, but used the station and yard facilities at Beatty belonging to the Las Vegas & Tonopah Railroad Company.

== Corporate history ==
The Bullfrog Goldfield Railroad Company was incorporated September 1, 1905, under the general laws of Nevada, for a period of 50 years, by interests connected with the Tonopah and Goldfield Railroad Company and apparently connected with the Tonopah Mining Company. The purpose was to build a line from the southern terminus of the line of the Tonopah and Goldfield Railroad Company, at Goldfield, southward to the mining field in which Beatty and Rhyolite were the principal camps, thereby giving an outlet to this mining territory over the line of the Tonopah and Goldfield Railroad Company to the Central Pacific Railway Company at Tonopah in competition with the lines of the Las Vegas and Tonopah Railroad Company and the Tonopah and Tidewater Railroad Company, both of which had connections southward.

Construction was by the Amargosa Construction Company under contracts dated March 20, 1906, and December 27, 1907. The mileage shown above is that appearing in the records of the Bullfrog Goldfield Railroad Company. Construction commenced in the early part of 1906, and the line was completed, equipped, and opened for operation in May 1907, from which date the Amargosa Construction Company operated the road until January 1, 1908.

Funds for construction were furnished by the construction company which, in turn, appears to have been supplied by a syndicate, called the Bullfrog syndicate, in existence at the time of construction. It seems that the Bullfrog syndicate controlled the Amargosa Construction Company, but the records obtainable do not disclose that the officers or directors of the Bullfrog Goldfield Railroad Company had any interest in the Bullfrog syndicate or the Amargosa Construction Company.

The original railroad of the Bullfrog Goldfield Railroad Company was constructed as follows:

From Rhyolite to Beatty 7.79 miles (12.54 km)
From Beatty to Bonnie Claire 37.49 miles (60.33 km)
From Bonnie Claire to Goldfield 36.65 miles (58.98 km)

Total 81.93 miles (131.85 km)

Mining, the basic industry in this region, suffered a severe decline soon after the Bullfrog Goldfield Railroad Company was completed. The decline of the mining resources soon led, in 1908, to a joint operating arrangement with the Tonopah & Tidewater Railroad Company under a holding company incorporated in Delaware as the Tonopah & Tidewater Company. The failure of this arrangement to bring about the desired financial improvement led to a reorganization in June 1914, whereby the parallel line of the Las Vegas & Tonopah Railroad Company was eliminated and the Bullfrog Goldfield Railroad Company passed under the control of the latter company, with which it has since been operated as a continuous road, but as a distinct corporation.

The traffic scarcity which ensued, coupled with the competition of the Las Vegas & Tonopah Railroad Company's line, which paralleled the Bullfrog Goldfield Railroad Company's line to Goldfield and also had a southern connection, induced the Bullfrog Goldfield Railroad Company to unite with the Tonopah and Tidewater Railroad Company, which had a southern connection in competition with the Las Vegas & Tonopah Railroad Company, in a traffic arrangement in which the principal feature was the operation of both roads as one system. The joint-operating plan became effective January 1, 1908. To insure to each an equitable participation in the advantages which it was hoped would accrue from this plan, a holding company, named Tonopah and Tidewater Company, was incorporated in Delaware and exchanged its own capital stock, share for share, for all of the capital stock, except directors' qualifying shares, of the two railroads.

However, owing to the constant shrinkage in traffic, this arrangement did not yield the anticipated results. Both companies continued to operate at a deficit, the Tonopah and Tidewater Railroad Company making advances to the Bullfrog Goldfield Railroad Company to assist it in meeting its charges and, in turn, being assisted by the interests behind it. The Bullfrog Goldfield Railroad Company finally became so involved that it could not pay its debts. To avert foreclosure, a reorganization agreement was concluded June 26, 1914, between the Bullfrog Goldfield Railroad Company, a committee representing its security holders, and the Las Vegas & Tonopah Railroad Company, whereby parallel portions of the lines of both the Bullfrog Goldfield Railroad Company and the Las Vegas & Tonopah Railroad Company were abandoned, changes were made in the capitalization of the Bullfrog Goldfield Railroad Company, and traffic arrangements were agreed upon. When this plan became effective, July 20, 1914, the joint agreement with the Tonopah and Tidewater Railroad Company was canceled and the Tonopah and Tidewater Company dissolved.

The Bullfrog Goldfield Railroad Company was controlled by the Las Vegas & Tonopah Railroad Company through the ownership of 51 per cent of its outstanding capital stock, acquired in the reorganization settlement of 1914. The two railroads have since been operated as a single road, although as distinct corporations, between Goldfield and Las Vegas.

In accordance with the reorganization agreement of June 26, 1914, the Bullfrog Goldfield Railroad Company conveyed to the Las Vegas & Tonopah Railroad Company the line from Rhyolite (Bullfrog mine) to Beatty 7.79 miles (12.54 km), and from Bonne Claire to Goldfield 36.65 miles (58.98 km), total 44.44 miles (71.52 km). It acquired from the Las Vegas & Tonopah Railroad Company its line from Beatty to Rhyolite (Tramps mine) 5.83 miles (9.38 km), and from Bonnie Claire to Goldfield 42.12 miles (67.79 km), total 47.95 miles (77.17 km). These transfers changed the Bullfrog Goldfield Railroad Company's mileage so that, at June 30, 1915, the line owned comprised, according to surveys by ICC engineers:

Main Line at 30 June 1915:

Branch Beatty to Rhyolite (Tramps mine), acquired from the Las Vegas & Tonopah Railroad Company 5.83 miles (9.38 km)
Beatty to Bonnie Claire (part of original line) 36.83 miles (59.27 km)
Bonnie Claire to Goldfield (acquired from the Las Vegas & Tonopah Railroad Company) 42.12 miles (67.79 km)

Total: 84.78 miles (136.44 km)

== Locomotives ==
Number	Builder	Type	Works Number	Built	Acquired	Image	Notes
#3	Baldwin Locomotive Works	0-6-0	#29712	1906	1908		Originally built for the Bullfrog Goldfield Railroad in 1906. Sister locomotive was BGRR #4. Became property of the Tonopah and Tidewater Railroad in 1908. Never used on the railroad, and sold to the Las Vegas and Tonopah Railroad becoming their 2nd #3. Later sold to the Ludlow & Southern Railway becoming their #3, and eventually ended up with the Utah Copper Co. as their #400.
#4	Baldwin	0-6-0	#29713	1906	1908		Originally built for the Bullfrog Goldfield Railroad in 1906. Sister locomotive was BGRR #3. Became property of the Tonopah and Tidewater Railroad in 1908. Never used on the railroad, and sold to the Utah Copper Co. as their #401.
#11	Baldwin	4-6-0	#29726	1906	1908		Originally Bullfrog Goldfield Railroad #13, and later became property of the Tonopah and Tidewater Railroad in 1908. Sister locomotive was BGRR #12. Sold in 1917 to the Northwestern Pacific Railroad as their #178. Scrapped 1954.
#12	Baldwin	4-6-0	#29727	1906	1908		Originally Bullfrog Goldfield Railroad #14, and later became property of the Tonopah and Tidewater Railroad in 1908. Sister locomotive was BGRR #11. Destroyed in a boiler explosion in 1910, tender and frame sold to the San Diego and Arizona Railway. It became their #20, and was scrapped 1950. Bell was saved for the schoolhouse at Ludlow, California.
#54	Baldwin	2-8-0	#29265	1906	1908		Originally built for the Bullfrog Goldfield Railroad in 1906, later became property of the Tonopah and Tidewater Railroad in 1908. Same class of locomotive as T&T #7 and #8, along with sister engine #55. Gone from the BG roster by 1917. Sold to the National Railways of Mexico around 1923.
#55	Baldwin	2-8-0	##29266	1906	1908		Originally built for the Bullfrog Goldfield Railroad in 1906, later became property of the Tonopah and Tidewater Railroad in 1908. Same class of locomotive as T&T #7 and #8, along with sister engine #54. Said to have been sold to the Tonopah and Goldfield Railroad in 1917.

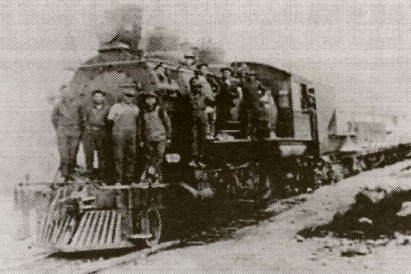
Goldfield Railroad Engine No. 1 and its crew September, 1905. From left to right: William Pooley. Robert Harper, Lavey Curran, William Kendall, George Wells. Ray Favey, Harry Kendall and probably Hal Mcleod and Favey in the cab.

== Closure ==
The Bullfrog Goldfield Railroad ceased to operate in January 1928. Before the closure, it had leased its tracks to either the Tonopah & Tidewater Railroad Company or to the Las Vegas & Tonopah Railroad Company. Management changed hands on 5 occasions over its 21 year long existence. The Bullfrog Goldfield freight depot and maintenance building stood at Fifth Avenue and Pearl Street of Goldfield opposite the Santa Fe Saloon and has been reconstructed in 2017.

== See also ==
- List of defunct Nevada railroads
