= Richard C. Baker =

British businessman

Richard C. Baker (1858 – 1937) was the British business partner of Francis Marion "Borax" Smith and eventually became president of the Pacific Coast Borax Company and the Tonopah and Tidewater Railroad.

In 1899, "Borax" Smith, founder of Pacific Coast Borax Company joined forces with Baker to form Borax Consolidated, Ltd. Together they formed a multinational mining conglomerate, and Baker worked to expand the company's foreign holdings in Italy, Turkey, and South America and subsequently became responsible for capitally financing the corporation's development. The incorporation included the Sterling Borax Company and the Suckow Property which is now operated as the Rio Tinto Borax Mine, the largest open pit mine in California and the largest borax mine in the world where almost half of the world's borates are now produced.

After Smith's bankruptcy in 1913, Baker took control of the company, and he remained president until his death in 1937.

In 1908, Baker, California, which at that time was a stop on the Tonopah and Tidewater Railroad, was named for him.

The mineral bakerite is also named after him.

== See also ==
- Baker, Kern County, California - location of the Rio Tinto Borax Mine

== Additional sources ==
- Hildebrand, George Herbert (1982). Borax Pioneer: Francis Marion Smith. San Diego: Howell-North Books. ISBN 0-8310-7148-6.
