= Tonopah and Tidewater Railroad =

American railway from 1904 to 1940

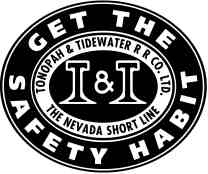

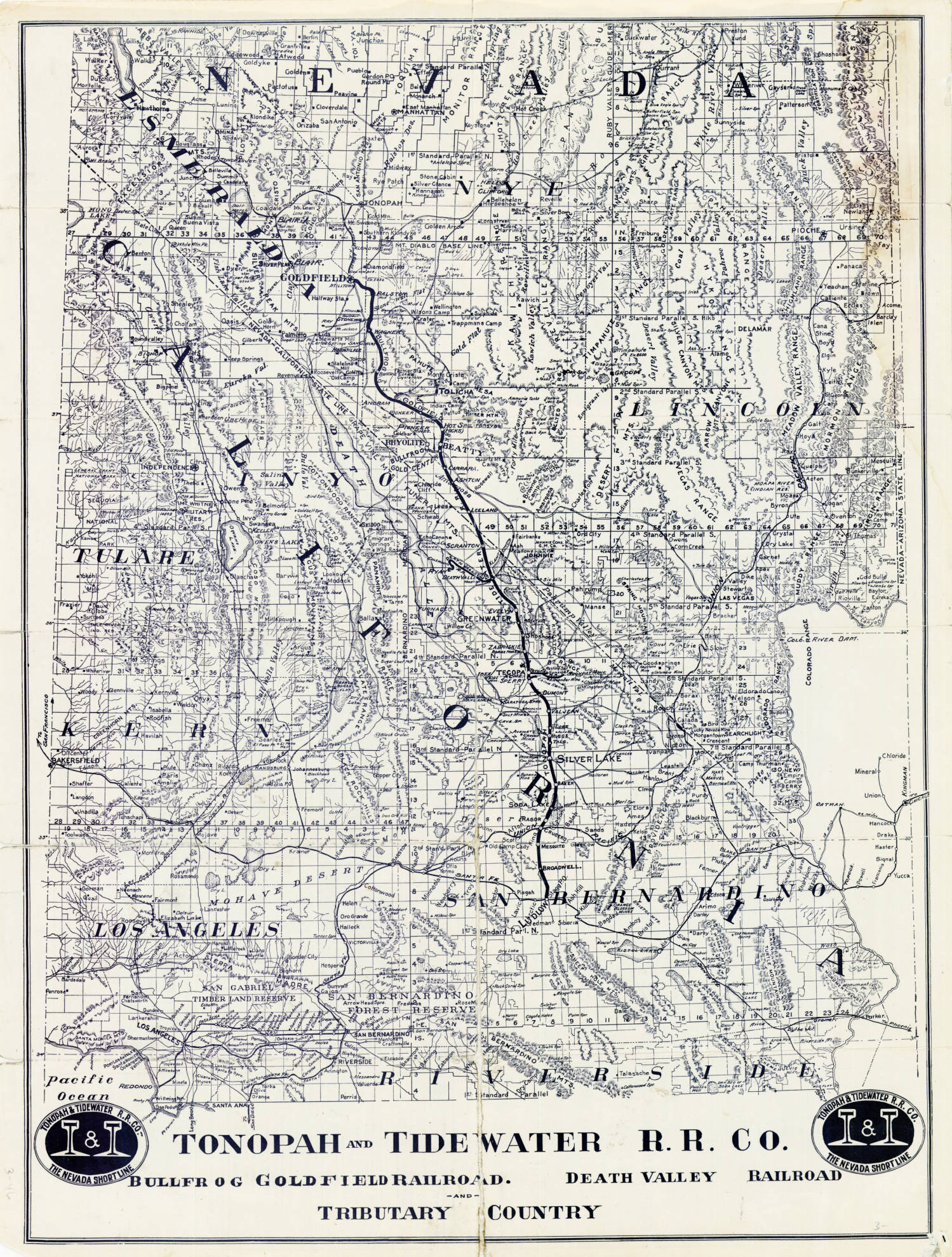
- Map showing the route of the T&T.

Overview
- Headquarters: Ludlow, California
- Reporting mark: T&T
- Locale: Ludlow, California, to Gold Center, Nevada (later extended to Beatty, Nevada, and Goldfield, Nevada, by way of the Bullfrog Goldfield Railroad in 1908)
- Dates of operation: 1904; 122 years ago – 1940; 86 years ago

Technical
- Track gauge: 4 ft 8 1/2 in (1,435 mm) standard gauge

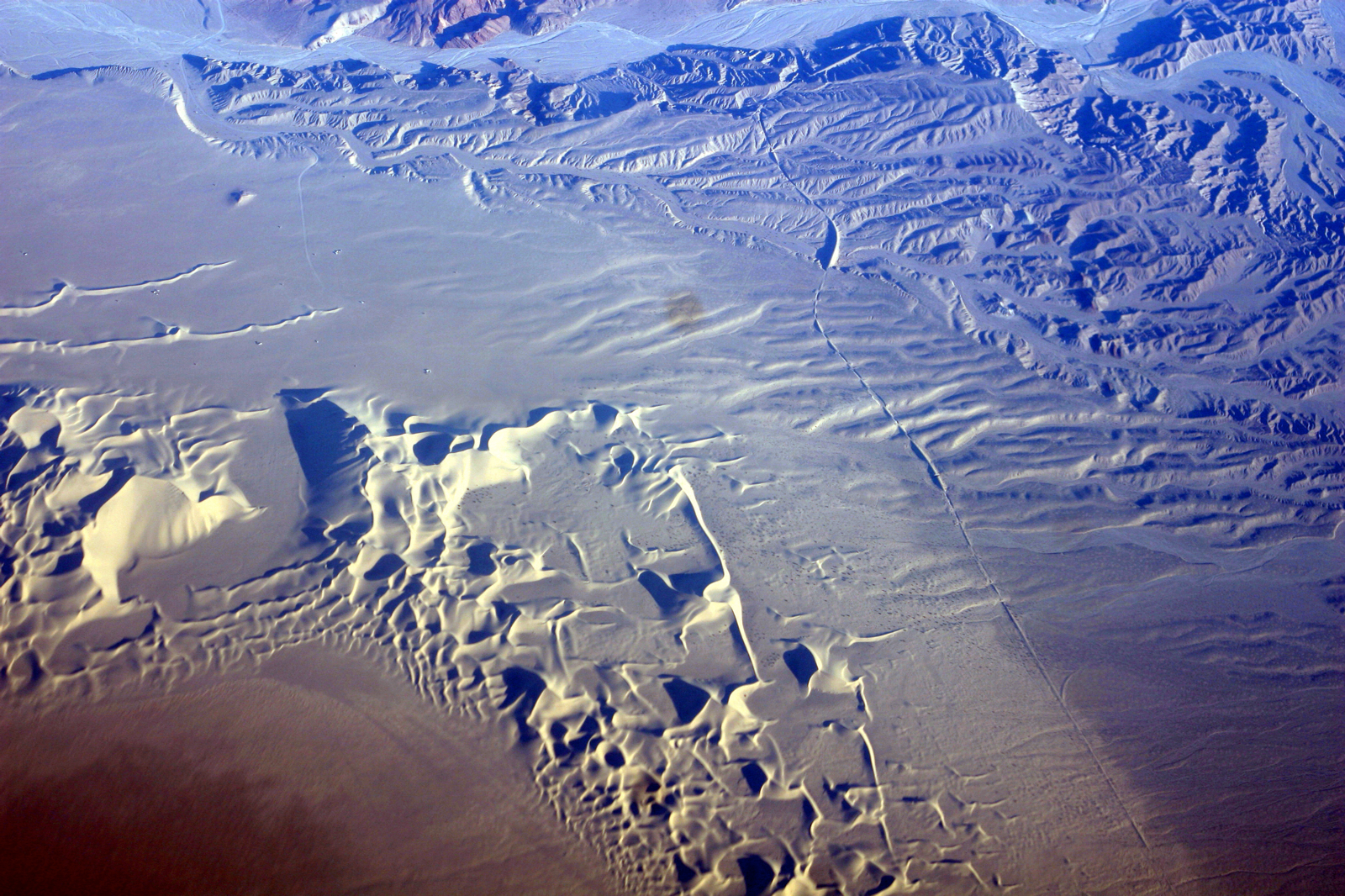
Trace of the Tonopah and Tidewater Railroad to the right of the Dumont Dunes, south of Death Valley

The Tonopah and Tidewater Railroad (reporting mark T&T) was a former class II railroad that served eastern California and southwestern Nevada.

The railroad was built mainly to haul borax from Francis Marion Smith's Pacific Coast Borax Company mines located just east of Death Valley, but it also hauled lead, clay, feldspar, passengers and general goods across the desert to a connection with the Atchison, Topeka and Santa Fe Railroad at Ludlow, California, and to the Los Angeles and Salt Lake Railroad (later Union Pacific Railroad) at Crucero, California.

The railroad was originally intended to run from Tonopah, Nevada, to San Diego, California (the "tidewater"), but never made it to either on its own rails. It was famous for being the last of the three railroads built to cross the Death Valley region, and outlasting them by over 30 years providing dedicated and reliable service to the desert residents. The T&T also formed part of a potential north-south transcontinental railroad route, connected together by four different US railway companies, later used as the basis to potentially form a Mid-Pacific Railroad.

The railroad operated from 1907 until 1940, when it suspended operations due to a lack of profitable traffic. The rails were taken up in 1943 for use in World War II and the company itself was officially abandoned by 1946.

== History ==
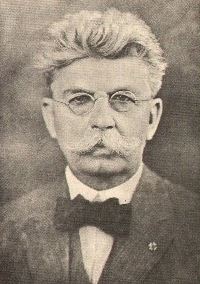
Francis Marion Smith, owner and head of Pacific Coast Borax and the Tonopah & Tidewater Railroad, until 1914

Francis Marion Smith was one of California's most successful entrepreneurs and mining tycoons. In 1890, he had incorporated the Pacific Coast Borax Company and operated the largest borax mine in the world at Borate, located 11 miles (18 km) north of Daggett, California, with the Borate and Daggett Railroad running a more than adequate service between the two stops. Smith was also responsible for building several interurban and rapid transport systems around Oakland, California, and San Francisco, California. By 1901, Smith started searching some old borax claims located in the Black Mountains, just east of Death Valley, and located the Lila C. mine, about 135 miles (217 km) from the nearest railhead of Ivanpah, California, on the Santa Fe.

To bring the borax out from this remote region, he tried to use an old steam tractor to haul the ore, but it was not suited for the harsh desert conditions and was quickly taken out of service. Smith then considered the idea of building a railroad from the nearest point possible on the Santa Fe, to connect the Lila C. to the most intermediate route to his refineries at Alameda, California and Bayonne, New Jersey. He had also hoped of extending the railroad towards Tonopah, Nevada, as during that time there was a great mining boom going on in the region, with gold and silver mines popping out from all over the area, and even as far south as Beatty, Nevada, Goldfield and Rhyolite, Nevada. On July 19, 1904, Francis Marion Smith had incorporated the Tonopah & Tidewater Railroad Company in New Jersey, with Smith as president, and his associates DeWitt Van Buskirk as vice-president, C.B. Zabriskie as secretary-treasurer, and John Ryan as superintendent and general manager.

After considering building his railroad from several locations including Manvel, California (now Barnwell), and Daggett, California, Francis Smith eventually ran into William A. Clark, Montana senator and head of the Los Angeles and Salt Lake Railroad, at Las Vegas, Nevada. Clark proposed to Smith that the T&T could be built out of Las Vegas, as the quickest and most direct way to the borax mine and Tonopah goldfields. Smith reacted enthusiastically to Clark's proposal, and he agreed. However, Clark himself was considering building a railroad to Tonopah, and allowing a direct competitor to build right in his way put Clark in a very awkward position.

=== Beginnings ===
In 1905, Francis Marion Smith immediately sent crews out to Las Vegas to begin construction of the Tonopah & Tidewater Railroad. Grading was started on May 29, and by mid-July, about 12 miles (19 km) of roadbed was graded. William Clark had tried constantly to discourage Smith from building his railroad, from raising rates for construction materials to consolidating the Nevada Rapid Transist Company and building an auto road from Las Vegas to Beatty. The sharpest point in the barb poked in Smith's side, was when he was openly denied by LA&SL railroad officials to allow the T&T grade to connect to their main line. Smith tried to get in contact with Clark to figure out what was going on, but Clark had completely evaded Smith by hiding out in Paris. There, Clark had come up with the idea of building his own railroad to the Nevada goldfields, which would come to be known as the Las Vegas and Tonopah Railroad.

Despite Smith's disappointment, he held no resentment for Clark, and instead went to the Atchison, Topeka and Santa Fe Railroad to propose they use their stop at Ludlow, California, as the T&T's new terminus. This was the perfect get-back at Clark's double-cross, for Clark and the Santa Fe were in direct competition to one another. Plus, building north of Ludlow would bring about more business opportunities for the T&T to profit off of, as there were plenty of mines in the area where the Tonopah & Tidewater was planned to be built. The biggest drawback however, was that the railroad would be twice as long as it would've been if they built out of Las Vegas, about 200 miles (320 km) distance.

Francis Smith sold all of his Las Vegas railroad work, graded roadbed, property and supplies to Clark, and moved immediately to Ludlow and started building the T&T with new construction material provided by the Santa Fe. Starting construction in November, it soon got too hot for the railroad workers during the summer months. Water was the hardest to provide, but plenty of meat was made available by the butchers located in Daggett. The T&T construction crews eventually reached Crucero, California, by 1906, where they had to cross over the mainline of the Los Angeles and Salt Lake Railroad. An agreement was written by the T&T and the LA&SL to use Crucero as an interchange and crossover point between the two railroads, but it did not entirely suit either party. They eventually came to a mutual agreement, and the T&T construction crews pushed further north.

The hardest part of building the Tonopah and Tidewater Railroad was going through the Amargosa Canyon. It took several thousand head of mules and men to blast their way through the canyon, and took nearly three years to get to the other end where Tecopa, California now stands. The Tonopah and Tidewater reached Death Valley Junction, California, by 1907, the closest point to the Lila C. borax mine. Here, a branch line was built to the mine and trains immediately started transporting the borax to the Santa Fe. The last spike was hammered into place at Gold Center, Nevada, with no celebration, as the Las Vegas and Tonopah Railroad had already beat the T&T to Goldfield, and the financial panic of 1907 was severely crippling the operations of the gold mines.

Nevertheless, the Tonopah and Tidewater was in a better position to be more profitable than the Las Vegas and Tonopah, and in 1908 merged with the Bullfrog Goldfield Railroad to reach Goldfield, also connecting to Tonopah by way of the Tonopah and Goldfield Railroad. The T&T's rates were cut shorter than the LV&T, and passengers preferred the shorter route of the T&T over the LV&T as it was 100 miles (160 km) shorter than it took to get to Los Angeles by the former. By the time World War I broke out, the Las Vegas and Tonopah Railroad was in a bad state. The United States Railroad Administration took over the T&T and the LV&T as with all the nation's railroads, but deemed the latter as an unnecessary route and had the LV&T taken up for scrap in 1918.

The Lila C. mines were exhausted by 1913, and the T&T filed to extend their branchline to the new mines at Ryan, California (formerly Devar). However, with their mounting debt of over $4.4 million they were denied to do so by the ICC, and instead Pacific Coast Borax organized a new railroad, the 3 ft-gauge Death Valley Railroad, to haul the ore from Ryan to the T&T at Death Valley Junction.

=== Decline ===
By 1927, Pacific Coast Borax Company had moved their mining operations to Boron, located 80 miles (130 km) away from Death Valley. The Tonopah and Tidewater had to resort to hauling lead from Tecopa, feldspar and clay from Bradford Siding, north of Death Valley Junction, along with gypsum, talc and general goods. Without the borax mine however, the T&T only showed profit for about four years before finances dropped sharply. The Bullfrog Goldfield Railroad was abandoned by 1928, severing the T&T's rail link with Goldfield and Tonopah, forcing the railroad to cut back its tracks to Beatty.

The T&T tried to campaign tourism to Death Valley in an effort to stay alive. The railroad campaigned with the Union Pacific to have a Pullman sleeper service run from Los Angeles, interchange with the T&T at Crucero, and be hauled as far as Death Valley Junction, where guests could explore the valley and stay at exquisite hotels such as the Furnace Creek Inn and the Death Valley View Hotel at Ryan, by way of the Death Valley Railroad. The Great Depression severely crippled the tourist trade for the Tonopah and Tidewater Railroad, and people began to use automobiles to get to and from the valley. It was soon becoming evident that the T&T was losing too much money to keep itself afloat, maintenance costs skyrocketed due to the many floods that plagued the right-of-way in several places. By 1938, the "Tired and Tardy" as the railroad was known by then, was over $5 million in debt.

Abandonment filings with the Interstate Commerce Commission were applied by the T&T as early as 1938. Many protests were made by the local businesses that relied on the T&T for their very existence, but the ICC eventually approved of the applications for abandonment by 1940. The railroad was laid in submission for a time in hopes of reopening to better traffic, but when the United States entered World War II in 1941, all of the T&T's rails and equipment were requisitioned by the War Department for use in Europe. It took nearly a year for Sharp and Fellows, Inc., to remove the entire railway between Ludlow and Beatty, leaving but the old trackbed behind, and a few ties in the lonely desert. Much of the salvageable wood from ties and bridges was used to build a few structures, most notably the Apple Valley Inn located at Apple Valley and the El Rancho Motel in Barstow. A few buildings in Tecopa, California, along with the facilities for the hot springs, were also built from old T&T railroad ties. Many of them built by Harry Rosenberg Sr., who was the section gang foreman for the railroad from 1927 till abandonment in 1943.

Only a boxcar #129, flatcar #205, caboose #402, parts of coach chair car #30 (car itself scrapped 2022), outfit diner car #506 (formerly coach #20), a handcar and a gas-driven railcar #99 still exist. Whatever else that remains is now scattered across museums and private collections located in the Mojave Desert and around the world.

A portion of the route between China Ranch and Tecopa was converted to a rail trail, the Amargosa River Trail.

=== Museum ===
A Tonopah & Tidewater Railroad Historical Society was formed in 2015 with the intent of preserving the history of the old desert railroad, and to build a HO Scale layout of it running between Ludlow, California and Death Valley Junction. The museum was formerly based in the Amargosa Opera House and Hotel located in Death Valley Junction, California, but has since moved to Goldfield, Nevada. The model railroad is currently not operating and a proper location to host it is being sought.

== Locomotives ==
The Tonopah and Tidewater had a maximum of 16 locomotives, 10 steam locomotives and one gas-driven railcar, and 6 steam engines added into the roster when it merged with the Bullfrog Goldfield Railroad in 1908.

Number	Builder	Type	Works Number	Built	Acquired	Image	Notes
#1	Baldwin Locomotive Works	4-6-0	#14418	1895	1904		Built for the Wisconsin and Michigan Railroad as their 1st #8, but sent back to Baldwin for being too big for the line. Later sold to the Union Construction Co. to construct the Randsburg Railway and became their No. 1. Later acquired by the AT&SF and renumbered #260, #641, and #846, before going to the T&T in 1905. Scrapped 1941, bell was saved by the Railway and Locomotive Historical Society and is on display inside the RailGiants Train Museum at Pomona, California
#2	Dickson Manufacturing Company	2-6-0	#454	1883	1906		Originally built for the Delaware, Lackawanna and Western Railroad as their #85 (Buffalo Division), and later became #671. Sold to the Tonopah and Tidewater Railroad by way of Fitzhugh-Luther Co. on 6/11/06. In 1910, the engine went to the Goldfield Consolidated Mining Co. and became their #2.
#3	Unknown						There is some mystery as to what the #3 of the T&T actually was. According to T&T railroad superintendent Wash Cahill, #3 went on to the Goldfield Consolidated Mining Co. and became their #2. Conflicting sources, however, state that the 2-6-0 that went to Goldfield was actually T&T #2. Railroad author Phil Serpico writes in his book about the T&T, that it may have been a Baldwin-built compound 2-8-0 locomotive bought from the Philadelphia, Reading and New Eastern Railway, numbered #40. The 2-8-0 was sold in 1910, to the Males Company of New York City and Norman B. Livermore of San Francisco, California. Final disposition of this engine is unknown.
#4	Baldwin Locomotive Works	2-6-0	#29312	1906	1906		Ordered for the Tonopah and Tidewater, straight from the Baldwin Locomotive Works on 6/22/1906. Later leased and sold to the Santa Maria Valley Railroad in 1913, becoming their #2. Scrapped 1937.
#5	Baldwin Locomotive Works	2-8-0	#31418	1907	1907		Ordered for the Tonopah and Tidewater, straight from the Baldwin Locomotive Works on 2/21/1907. Sister locomotive to #6. Sold to the Santa Maria Valley Railroad in 1913, and became their second #1. Scrapped 1937.
#6	Baldwin Locomotive Works	2-8-0	#31419	1907	1907		Ordered for the Tonopah and Tidewater, straight from the Baldwin Locomotive Works on 2/21/1907. Sister locomotive to #5. Sold to Pacific Portland Cement Co. of Auburn, California.
#6 (2nd)	Baldwin Locomotive Works	2-8-0	#30107	1907	1921		Originally Las Vegas and Tonopah Railroad #6, sold to the T&T in 1921. Later sold to Six Companies Inc. to assist in the construction of Hoover Dam, and became their #7101. Scrapped around 1936 or 1937.
#7	Baldwin Locomotive Works	2-8-0	#31750	1907	1907		Ordered for the Tonopah and Tidewater, straight from the Baldwin Locomotive Works on 2/21/1907. Sister locomotive to #8. Sold to the Tonopah and Goldfield Railroad and became their 2nd #53 in 1944. Scrapped 1948.
#8	Baldwin Locomotive Works	2-8-0	#31791	1907	1907		Ordered for the Tonopah and Tidewater, straight from the Baldwin Locomotive Works on 2/21/1907. Sister locomotive to #7. Bought by Henry J. Kaiser Co. (later Kaiser Steel Corp.) for work at their steel mill in Fontana, California. Later converted to an 0-8-0 and scrapped 1947.
#9	Baldwin Locomotive Works	4-6-0	#32292	1907	1907		Ordered for the Tonopah and Tidewater, straight from the Baldwin Locomotive Works on 8/6/1907. Sister locomotive to #10. Sold to the Morrison-Knudsen Co. in 1945, and used at the Norton Army Air Field near San Bernardino, California, later to the Travis Army Air Field at Fairfield, California. Scrapped 1946.
#10	Baldwin Locomotive Works	4-6-0	#32293	1907	1907		Ordered for the Tonopah and Tidewater, straight from the Baldwin Locomotive Works on 8/6/1907. Sister locomotive to #9. Sold to the Morrison-Knudsen Co. in 1945, and used at the Norton Army Air Field near San Bernardino, California, later to the Travis Army Air Field at Fairfield, California Scrapped 1946.
#99	St. Louis Car Company	G/E Motorcar	#1484/349	1928	1928		Ordered by the Tonopah & Tidewater, and arrived on the railroad on Christmas, 1928. Used for tourist service, and pulled a maximum of 2 to 3 Pullman sleeper cars brought over by the Union Pacific Railroad. Sold 1943 to the Ferrocarril Sonora–Baja California in Mexico, became SBC #2501. Retired about 1963, and still exists today. Currently in storage at the railroad shops in Benjamin Hill.

- Sharp & Fellows #7, an ALCO-Dickson 2-6-2 steam locomotive, was brought over to the T&T by Sharp and Fellows, Inc. to aid with the taking up of rails between Beatty, Nevada and Ludlow, California in 1943. It has been preserved and is on display at the Travel Town Museum in Los Angeles, California.

=== Locomotives inherited from the Bullfrog Goldfield Railroad ===
These locomotives became possession of the Tonopah and Tidewater Railroad in 1908, upon merging with the Bullfrog Goldfield Railroad. The BGRR was later sold to the Las Vegas and Tonopah Railroad in 1914, then back to the T&T after abandonment of the LV&T in 1918. The BGRR was abandoned in 1928.

Number	Builder	Type	Works Number	Built	Acquired	Image	Notes
#3	Baldwin Locomotive Works	0-6-0	#29712	1906	1908		Originally built for the Bullfrog Goldfield Railroad in 1906. Sister locomotive was BGRR #4. Became property of the Tonopah and Tidewater Railroad in 1908. Never used on the railroad, and sold to the Las Vegas and Tonopah Railroad becoming their 2nd #3. Later sold to the Ludlow & Southern Railway becoming their #3, and eventually ended up with the Utah Copper Co. as their #400.
#4	Baldwin Locomotive Works	0-6-0	#29713	1906	1908		Originally built for the Bullfrog Goldfield Railroad in 1906. Sister locomotive was BGRR #3. Became property of the Tonopah and Tidewater Railroad in 1908. Never used on the railroad, and sold to the Utah Copper Co. as their #401.
#11	Baldwin Locomotive Works	4-6-0	#29726	1906	1908		Originally Bullfrog Goldfield Railroad #13, and later became property of the Tonopah and Tidewater Railroad in 1908. Sister locomotive was BGRR #12. Sold in 1917 to the Northwestern Pacific Railroad as their #178. Scrapped 1954.
#12	Baldwin Locomotive Works	4-6-0	#29727	1906	1908		Originally Bullfrog Goldfield Railroad #14, and later became property of the Tonopah and Tidewater Railroad in 1908. Sister locomotive was BGRR #11. Destroyed in a boiler explosion in 1910, tender and frame sold to the San Diego and Arizona Railway. It became their #20, and was scrapped 1950. Bell was saved for the schoolhouse at Ludlow, California.
#54	Baldwin Locomotive Works	2-8-0	#29265	1906	1908		Originally built for the Bullfrog Goldfield Railroad in 1906, later became property of the Tonopah and Tidewater Railroad in 1908. Same class of locomotive as T&T #7 and #8, along with sister engine #55. Gone from the BG roster by 1917. Sold to the National Railways of Mexico around 1923.
#55	Baldwin Locomotive Works	2-8-0	##29266	1906	1908	Originally built for the Bullfrog Goldfield Railroad in 1906, later became property of the Tonopah and Tidewater Railroad in 1908. Same class of locomotive as T&T #7 and #8, along with sister engine #54. Said to have been sold to the Tonopah and Goldfield Railroad in 1917.	

== Rolling stock ==
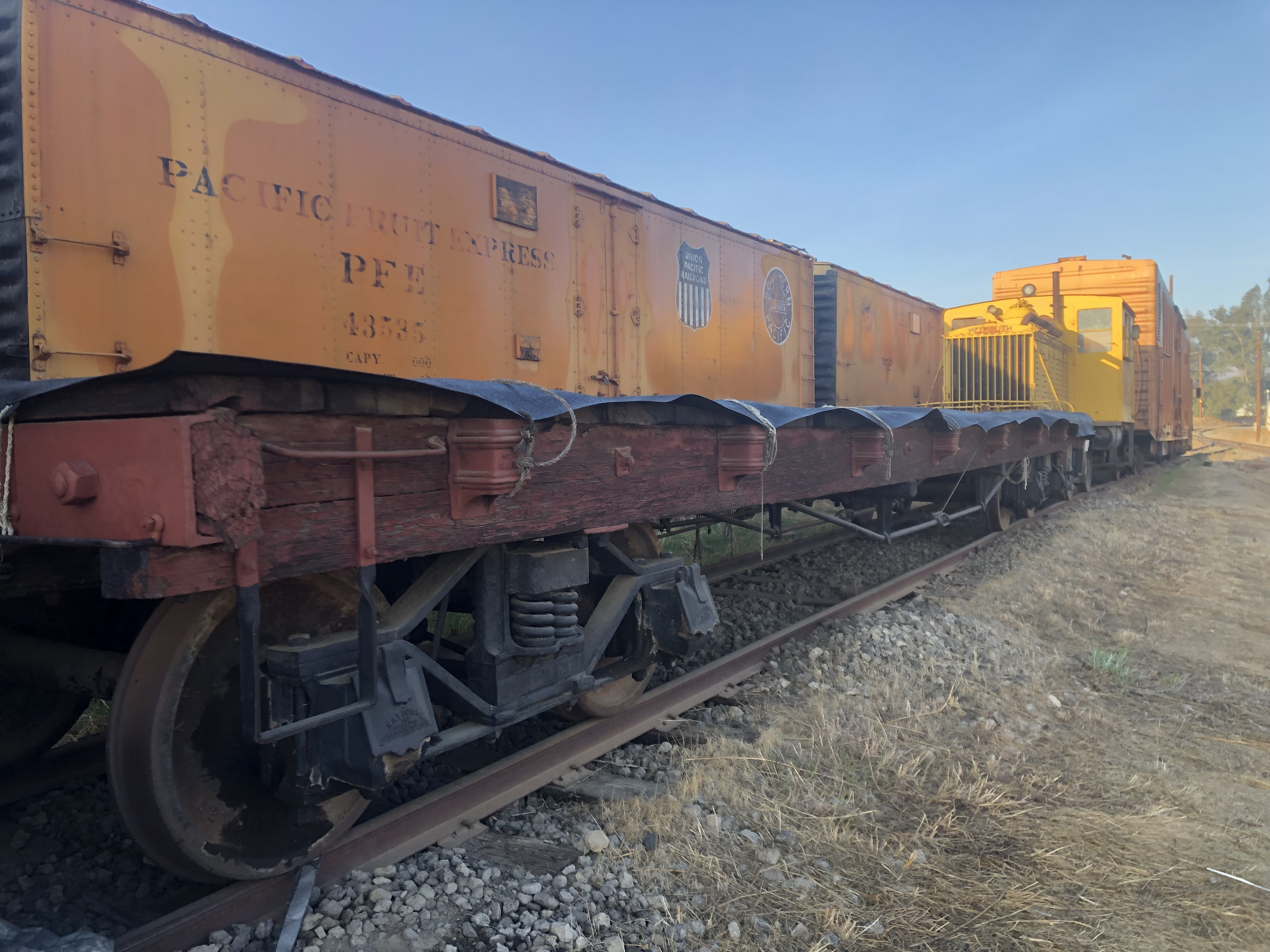
Tonopah & Tidewater Railroad flatcar #205 at the Southern California Railway Museum

Much of the T&T's rolling stock consisted of second-hand boxcars dating back to the 1880s and 1890s, most of them were acquired from the Delaware, Lackawanna and Western Railroad by way of railroad surplus dealer Fitzhugh-Luther Co. Freight on the line was hauled mostly in cars loaned from other railroads for faster transfer and shipment.

The T&T had some 2-axle trucked Pullman passenger cars bought new, and a few old wood-bodied passenger cars with end balconies built back in the 1890s. Some were eventually converted to work outfit cars or combine cars. The T&T would often hook a passenger car on their trains to serve as a passenger-carrying vehicle for both northbound and southbound trains. Despite this, the T&T did also have a few cabooses which were used on occasion with some of their trains.

== Route ==
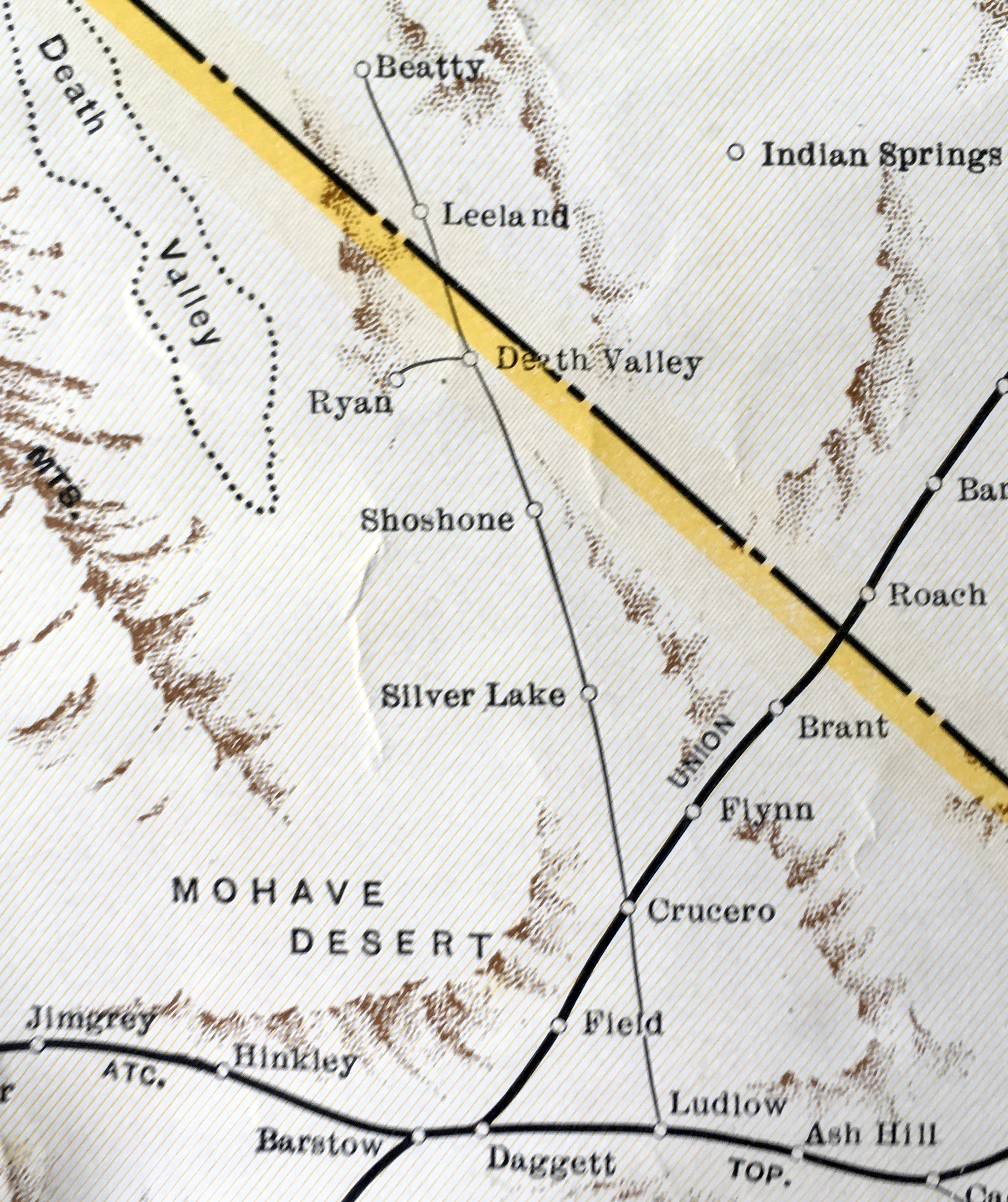
Tonopah and Tidewater Railroad route 1931

Many stops along the railroad were named for associates of Francis Marion Smith. Part of the Tonopah and Tidewater Railroad's route runs through the Death Valley National Park, and certain sections of it have been made into hiking trails for tourists. Other parts of the route are easily accessible to offroaders, and much of the former railroad bed parallels California State Route 127 between Baker and Death Valley Junction, California.

- Ludlow (MP 0.0), (interchange with the Atchison, Topeka and Santa Fe Railroad, location of the T&T's headquarters and locomotive repair facilities)
- Broadwell (MP 12.68)
- Mesquite (MP 21.49)
- Crucero, California (MP 25.68), (interchange with the Los Angeles and Salt Lake Railroad, later Union Pacific Railroad.)
- Rasor (MP 29.38), named for Clarence Rasor, Smith's employee. This area is privately owned within a remote public use area, the Rasor Off-Highway Vehicle Area.
- Soda Lake (MP 33.34), later renamed Zzyzx
- Baker (MP 41.82), formerly Berry, renamed for Richard C. Baker, Smith's business associate
- Silver Lake (MP 49.50)
- Talc (MP 56)
- Riggs (MP 59.47), formerly named Alta.
- Lore (MP 60)
- Valjean (MP 65.11)
- Dumont (MP 74.40), named after Harry Dumont who ran the company's San Francisco office.
- Sperry (MP 78.84), named after Smith's niece Charlotte Grace Sperry
- Acme (MP 82.97), formerly named Morrison.
- Tecopa (MP 87.67), junction point with the Tecopa Railroad.
- Zabriskie (MP 91.74), named for Christian Brevoort Zabriskie, superintendent at Columbus Marsh later in charge of New York operations.
- Shoshone (MP 96.95)
- Fitrol Spur (MP 97-98)
- Gerstley (MP 101.26), named for James Gerstley, Smith's business partner and later U.S. Borax President from 1950-1961.
- Jay (MP 106.00)
- Death Valley Junction (MP 122.01), junction for the Lila C. Branch (1907–1915) and interchange with the narrow gauge Death Valley Railroad
- Bradford Siding (MP 128.01), spur line went to clay pits from here.
- Muck (MP 131)
- Jenifer (MP 139.44), named for Frank Morgan Jenifer, president of the railroad.
- Leeland (MP 144.51)
- Ashton (MP 154.98)
- Carrara (MP 160.55), junction point with a cable tramway that went to a stone quarry, built by the Las Vegas and Tonopah Railroad.
- Post (MP 166), later renamed Weslead.
- Gold Center (MP 166.0), connection made here with the Bullfrog Goldfield Railroad heading up north to Beatty.
- Beatty Junction (MP 169.07), junction point with the Las Vegas and Tonopah Railroad.
- Beatty (MP 169.07), end track for the T&T and its facilities were joint owned with the Bullfrog Goldfield Railroad and the Las Vegas and Tonopah Railroad.

The following stops below are listed from the Bullfrog Goldfield Railroad as part of the Tonopah and Tidewater Railroad's route between Beatty and Bonnie Claire, Nevada. In operation from 1908 until 1927.

Also includes part of the Las Vegas and Tonopah Railroad, when it and the Bullfrog Goldfield merged in 1914, and had to cut off half of their routes and join together as there was not enough traffic to keep both routes going at the same time.

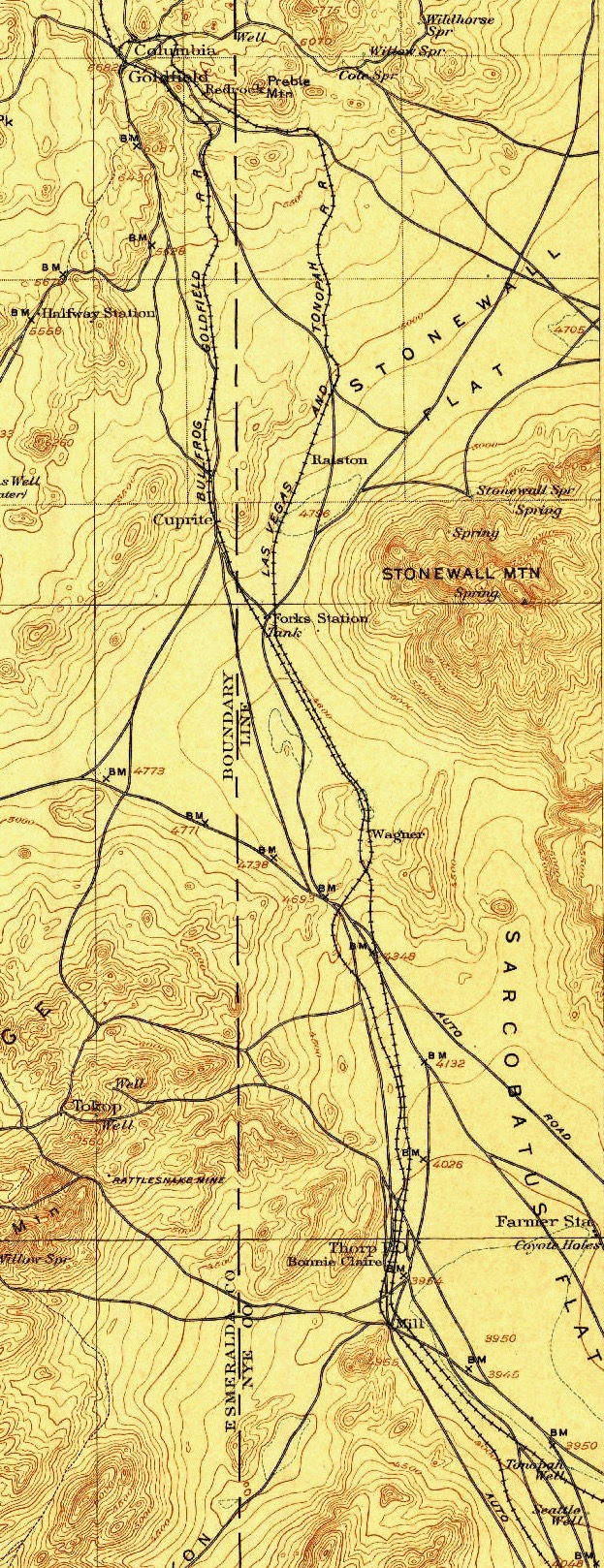
Bullfrog Goldfield Railroad 1908 northern section

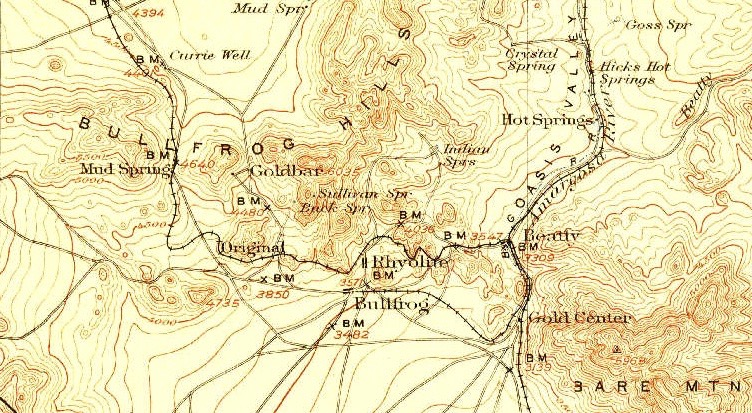
Southern portion of route in 1908

- Bullfrog (MP 170.18)
- Rhyolite (MP 171.58), the T&T reached here by way of the Bullfrog Goldfield Railroad by way of a branchline out of Beatty, Nevada.
- Wiggers (MP 172.49)
- Rider or Ryders (MP 173)
- Hot Springs (MP 174.49)
- Silica (MP 178)
- Springdale (MP 179.39)
- Tolicha (MP 186)
- Ancram (MP 188.59)
- Jacksonville (MP 193.19)
- Merger Mine (MP 194)
- Bonnie Claire (Thorp/Thorp's Wells) (MP 206.59), here the line deviated over the Las Vegas and Tonopah Railroad route after the reroute made to the tracks in 1914. All railroad points below are ex-LV&T stops used by the T&T and the BG after 1914.
- Wagner (MP 218.59)
- Stonewall (MP 227.17)
- Cuprite (MP 227.99)
- Silica (MP 229)
- Ralston (MP 231.47)
- Stella (MP 233.69)
- Keith (MP 240.19)
- Milltown (MP 241.19)
- Bullfrog Junction (MP 241.59), junction point for the Bullfrog Goldfield Railroad and the Tonopah and Goldfield Railroad.
- Goldfield (MP 242.69), originally a station of the Tonopah and Goldfield Railroad, also joint operated with the Bullfrog Goldfield Railroad. The T&T had an agency here until 1914 when it was rerouted over the LV&T tracks to their station and yard in Goldfield.

== In popular culture ==
- The Tonopah & Tidewater Railroad has also made a few appearances in film, in the 1909 documentary "Trip to Death Valley," Wallace Beery's 20 Mule Team Movie in 1940, and made a cameo appearance in an episode of The Rifleman, "Grasshopper." An episode of Death Valley Days, "The Rose of Rhyolite", was based on a real incident that happened on the railroad, though the T&T itself was not used in the episode, having been taken up long before filming began.

== See also ==
- Borate and Daggett Railroad
- Bullfrog Goldfield Railroad
- Death Valley Railroad
- Las Vegas and Tonopah Railroad
- Tonopah and Goldfield Railroad

Lists

- List of defunct California railroads
- List of defunct Nevada railroads
