= Tonopah and Goldfield Railroad =

American railway in Nevada from 1905 to 1947

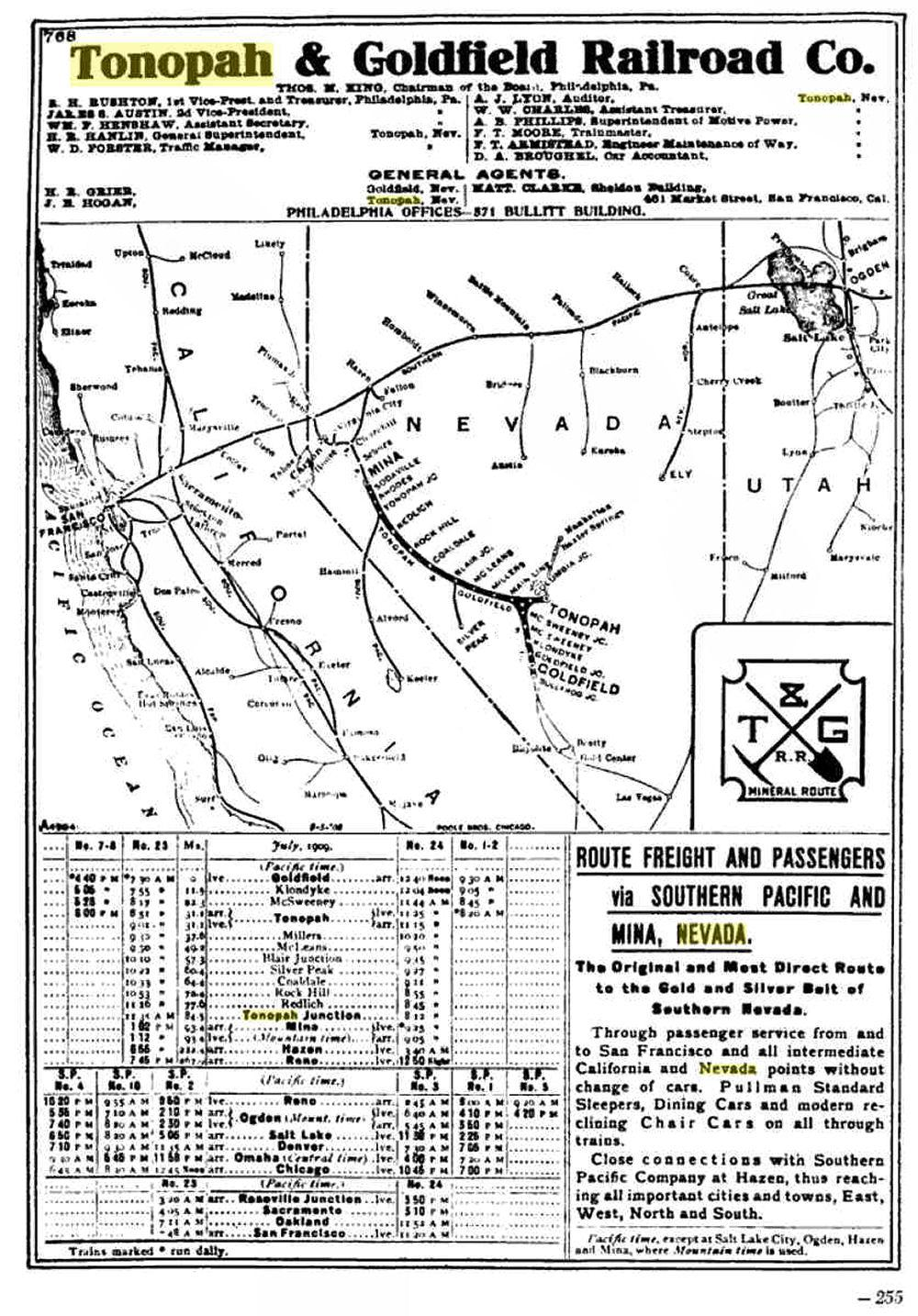

Overview
- Headquarters: Tonopah, Nevada; later, Seattle, Washington
- Reporting mark: T&G
- Locale: Mina, Nevada to Goldfield, Nevada
- Dates of operation: 1905–1947
- Predecessor: Tonopah Railroad; 3 ft (914 mm): Goldfield Railroad; 4 ft 8 1/2 in (1,435 mm) standard gauge

Technical
- Track gauge: 4 ft 8 1/2 in (1,435 mm) standard gauge

The Tonopah and Goldfield Railroad, a railroad of 100.4 miles (161.6 km) in length in the U.S. state of Nevada, offered point-to-point service between Mina and Goldfield, running over the Excelsior Mountains and parallel to the Monte Cristo Range. It operated from 1905 until 1947.

== Corporate history ==
=== Growth ===
Predecessors of the Tonopah and Goldfield (T&G) Railroad, including the Tonopah Railroad, began operations in 1903. The decade of the 1900s was a period of frenzied railroad-building in southwestern Nevada, with rich silver ore discovered at Tonopah in 1900 and gold-bearing quartz at Goldfield in 1902. In addition, silver was struck at Silver Peak. As the entire region was then served by nothing but stagecoaches, an infrastructure was quickly begun to serve what was a fast-growing network of precious-metal mines and miners. The first predecessor of the Tonopah and Goldfield Railroad, the Tonopah Railroad (built 1903–1904), was a 60-mile-long (97 km) narrow gauge line from what was then called Sodaville Junction (9 miles or 14 kilometres south of Mina) to Tonopah. This spur line merged with the Goldfield Railroad in November 1905 to create the Tonopah and Goldfield Railroad, and the merged rail line would continue to do business under this corporate name until ceasing operations in 1947.

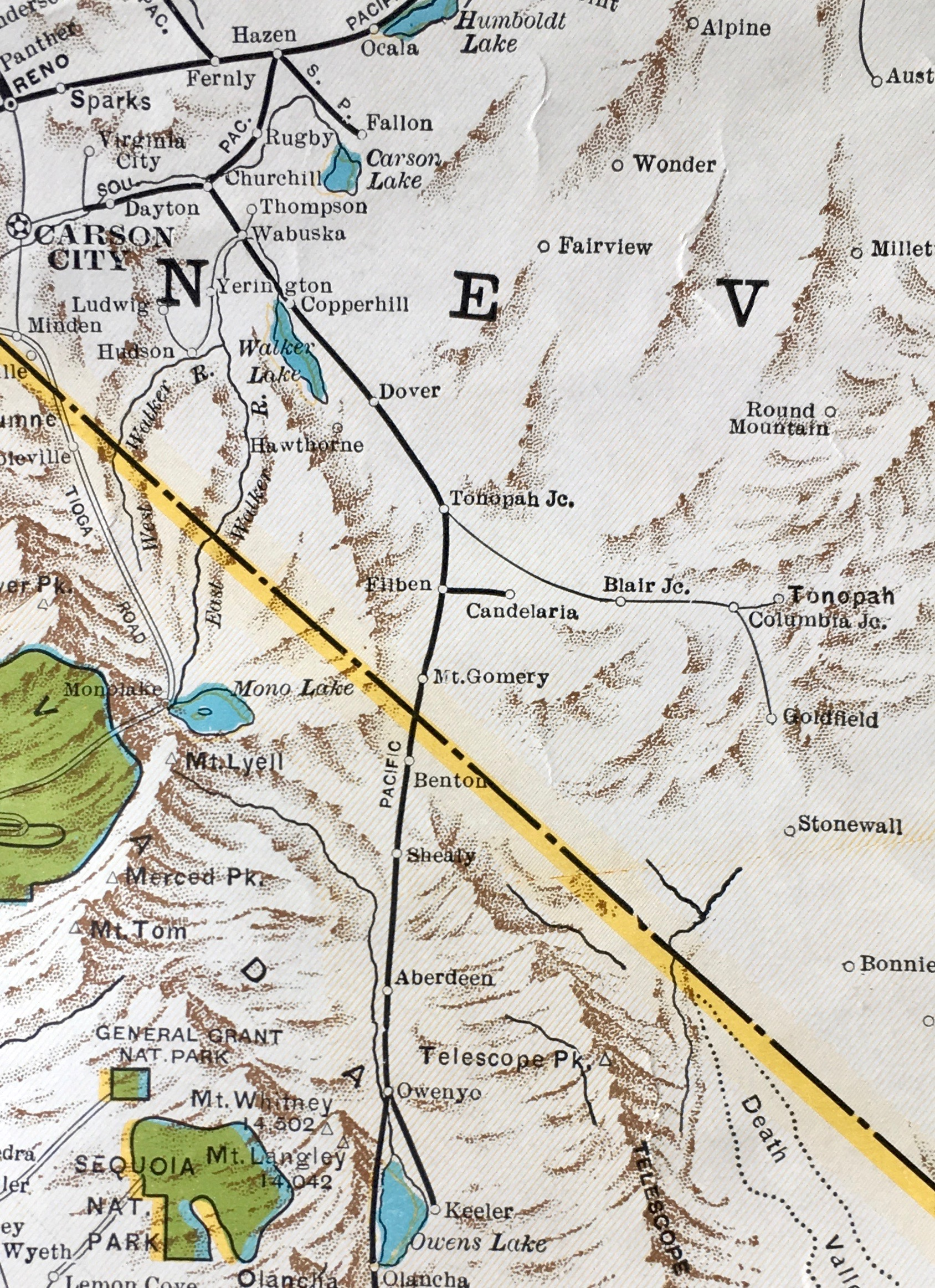
Tonopah and Goldfield Railroad 1931

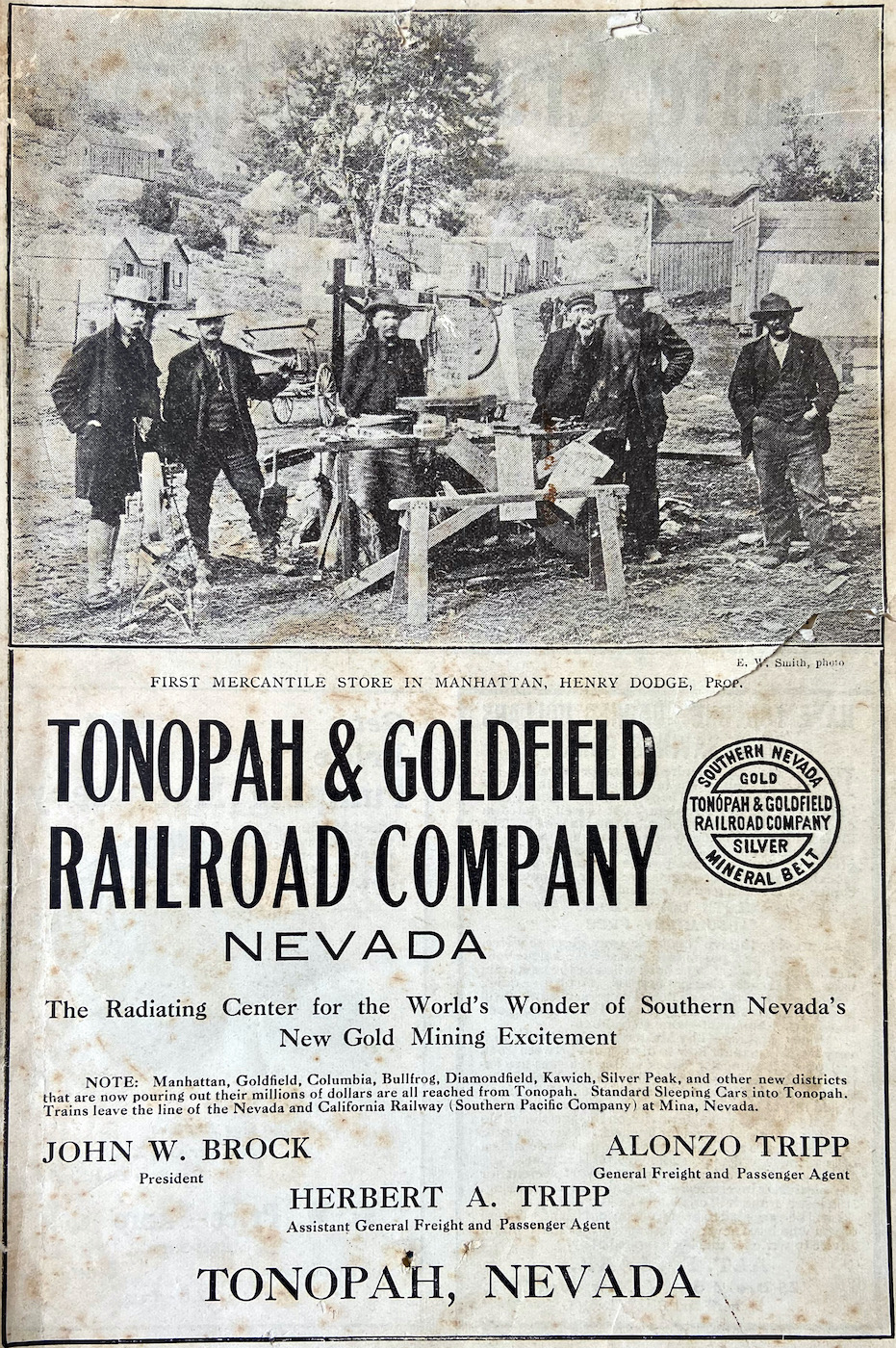
T&G RR advertisement featuring the Manhattan mining boom from Sunset magazine 1906

Investment money poured into the new gold fields, with the merged Tonopah and Goldfield Railroad claiming to have $2,150,000 in equity capital. The T&G began expanding its trackage in 1905 to cover the 31 miles (50 km) from Tonopah south to Goldfield, and the nine miles (14 km) north from Sodaville Junction through Sodaville to Mina. The merged railroad also relaid its existing tracks to become a standard gauge road.

With the gold and silver mines in full production, the Tonopah and Goldfield soon had competition from the Las Vegas and Tonopah Railroad and the Tonopah and Tidewater Railroad. In addition, the Bullfrog Goldfield Railroad built some right-of-way and leased out its trackage rights to operating railroads. The Tonopah and Goldfield held a brief strategic advantage over its competitors: its northern railhead at Mina was a junction point with the Nevada and California Railroad (N&C), an affiliate line of one of the largest railroads in the West, the Southern Pacific. This made it possible for passengers from the East or West Coasts to travel to the northern end of the Nevada and California spur line by fast Pullman service.

=== Connecting Southern Pacific trains ===
In September, 1905, Southern Pacific initiated service of Tonopah & Goldfield named trains numbered 23 and 24 from San Francisco, California, to Goldfield with Pullman cars, coaches, and a smoking car. The name was changed to the Goldfield Passenger in February, 1917. The train was unnamed during operation by the United States Railroad Administration from July 1, 1918, until March, 1920, when the train to Tonapah was renamed the Tonopah Express. A decade later, the Great Depression ended Pullman passenger train service to Tonopah in 1930. Discontinuance of the Express name and Pullman service might be because the final leg of the journey, from the Southern Pacific main line at Hazen, Nevada, over the N&C and T&G to Goldfield, had become very slow. A 1943 schedule indicates that a traveler would have had to expect to take 14 hours to ride the 228 miles (367 km) from Hazen to Goldfield, over what had by then become a deteriorated branch-line roadbed.

=== Decline ===
Gold production in the Esmeralda district peaked only a few years after the first discoveries of precious metal, with declines seen as early as 1911 and continuing thereafter. The weaker railroad lines began to crumble, with the Las Vegas and Tonopah ceasing operations in 1918 and the Bullfrog Goldfield in 1928.

By the 1920s, rubber-tired vehicles had come to Nevada. The Tonopah and Goldfield tried to meet this threat by cutting back their steam engine service. By 1931 the train's departure on five of the seven days of each week was not a steam train, but a motor train. Two or three weekly steam trains continued to run; the engines also pulled freight cars to serve the needs of the district's residual goods traffic.

The Great Depression in 1929–1940, and the departure of the United States from the gold standard in 1933, further depressed conditions in the Esmeralda district; the T&G operated under receivership in 1932–1937, and the Tonopah and Tidewater, less resilient, gave up the ghost in 1940.

During the World War II years, with gasoline rationing starting in 1942, the T&G was the only means of ingress and egress for many of the remaining ranchers and miners of southwestern Nevada. In addition, the railroad carried traffic to and from the wartime Tonopah Army Air Field (1942–45). A 1943 printed schedule indicates that during its final years of operation the railroad, although it continued to operate an office in Tonopah, appears to have been controlled by Seattle capital, and the railroad was managed from there.

With the reappearance of gasoline and shutdown of the army airfield in late 1945, the Tonopah and Goldfield was quickly faced with lethal business conditions. The short line permanently ceased operations in October 1947. By 2010, only bleached railroad ties marked the route of the once-pioneering line.

A few boxcars, a passenger car body and some old automobiles converted to run on T&G railway tracks currently survive at Goldfield, Nevada, and a boxcar from the narrow-gauge days is now at the Laws Railroad Museum. The Nevada State Railroad Museum is also in the possession of an old combine car body, caboose and former motorcar from the T&G.

== See also ==
- Bullfrog Goldfield Railroad
- Carson and Colorado Railway
- Las Vegas and Tonopah Railroad
- Tonopah and Tidewater Railroad
- List of defunct Nevada railroads
