= Swain (surname) =

Swain is an English surname derived from the Old Norse personal name Sveinn (Sven, Sweyn), from an Old Norse word meaning a youth or young man, and hence a young male attendant (compare in meaning Old English 'cniht' = knight; German 'Knecht'). There are a number of variations in the spelling of the surname Swain, including Swaine, Swainne, and Swayne.

From this word meaning boy, young male or lover, are derived:

- The noun swain, meaning a rustic lover or boyfriend, cf. the numerous examples in Shakespeare's work, including his lyric, "[w]ho is Sylvia, what is she that all our Swains commend her" (from The Two Gentlemen of Verona) and "O God! methinks it were a happy life, To be no better than a homely swain;" (from King Henry VI)
- There are also specific nautical words involving swain: boatswain (literally "young man in charge of a boat") which can be seen in Shakespeare's The Tempest, and coxswain.

The American Old West outlaw John Wesley Hardin used various aliases with Swain as the surname.

People with the name include:

- Ashok Swain, Indian-born professor at the Swedish Uppsala University
- Bennie Swain, American professional basketball player
- Brennan Swain, American television star and winner of The Amazing Race
- Brett Swain (disambiguation)
- Carol M. Swain (born 1954), American retired professor of political science and law and author
- Dailyn Swain (born 2005), American basketball player
- Daniel Swain (born 1983) or Danny!, American rap performer and record producer
- David Lowry Swain (1801–1868), governor of North Carolina
- Diana Swain, Canadian television journalist
- Dominique Swain, American actress
- Freda Swain, (1902 – 1985) British composer, pianist and music educator
- Freddie Swain (born 1998), American National Football League player
- George Swain (disambiguation)
- Gladys Swain, French psychiatrist and writer
- Jack Swain, English footballer
- James Swain, American author of mystery novels and non-fiction magic books
- John Swain (born 1959), American National Football League player
- Jon Swain (born 1948), British journalist and writer
- Joseph Swain (disambiguation)
- Joshua Swain Jr. (1804–1866), American state senator
- Kenny Swain (born 1952), English footballer
- Leonard Swain, American Congregational minister
- Louisa Ann Swain (1801–1880), the first woman in America to vote in a general election
- Mack Swain (1876–1935), American actor and vaudevillian
- Margaret Swain (1909–2002), English embroidery and textile historian
- Paul J. Swain (1943–2022), American Roman Catholic bishop
- Paul Swain (politician) New Zealand politician
- Richard Swain, New Zealand rugby league footballer of the 1990s and 2000s
- Robert Swain (disambiguation)
- Ryan Swain (presenter), English television and radio presenter and comedian
- Shurlee Swain, Australian social welfare historian
- Thomas Swain (1911–1979), British politician and Member of Parliament
- Tony Swain (disambiguation)
- Vicari Swain (born 2004), American football player
- William Swain (disambiguation)
- Zachary Swain (born 1977), American drummer

== See also ==
- Senator Swain (disambiguation)
- Swain (disambiguation)
- McSwain (disambiguation)
- Swaim, a surname
