= Buris Henriksen =

Duke of Southern Jutland
- Tenure: 1162-1167
- Born: ca. 1130
- Died: after 1167
- Spouse: Daughter of Herman II, Count of Winzenburg
- House: Estridsen
- Father: Henrik Skadelår
- Mother: Ingrid Ragnvaldsdotter

Buris Henriksen (ca. 1130-1167) was a Duke of Southern Jutland from 1162 to 1167. He was the son of Henrik Skadelår and a descendant of king Sweyn Estridsen. His mother was Ingrid Ragnvaldsdotter the granddaughter of king Inge I of Sweden. Two of his brothers became kings; Inge Krokrygg in Norway (1136-1161) and Magnus Henriksson in Sweden (1160-1161). In 1167 he was imprisoned in Søborg Castle by king Valdemar the Great, accused of conspiring to overthrow the king.

During the Danish Civil War Buris joined his brother Canute in supporting Canute V. After the Bloodfeast of Roskilde they changed sides to support Valdemar the Great. Valdemar was cautioned by his advisors that he needed to get rid of all the potential claimants to the throne, in order to secure his own position. But Valdemar chose to keep them close to the court instead, and often gave them titles and powerful positions. Buris' brother was made Duke of Southern Jutland, and Buris himself is known to have witnessed charters with the honorific: "the king's kinsman". After Canute died in 1162 Buris inherited his lands and title. Also in 1162 Buris accompanied Valdemar to the imperial court of Frederick Barbarossa at Dole. Saxo Grammaticus claimed that Valdemar brought him in order to avoid any intrigues when he was away.

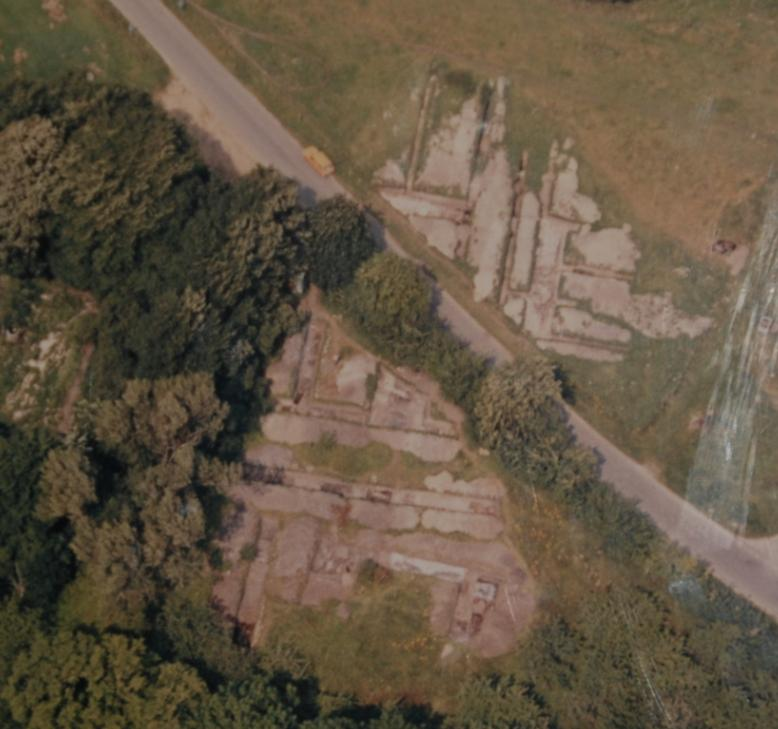
The ruins of Tvis Monastery, founded 1163 by Buris Henriksen

King Valdemar had his men swear allegiance to his son, Canute VI, in an attempt to secure the throne for his own descendants. Buris initially refused to acknowledge the child's new position as heir apparent, but acceded after Valdemar accepted his demands of territorial expansion of his duchy. However, soon after Valdemar had Buris captured, accused of conspiring against the king. Saxo tells the story that Buris was accused of conspiring with his brother Orm Ivarsson and the Norwegian Earl Erling Skakke to overthrow Valdemar. The Norwegians arrived with a fleet, but were halted by the forces of Absalon and forced to return to Norway. Valdemar then cited this as proof that Buris was guilty and locked him up in Søborg Castle.

It is not known what happened to Buris after this. Some sources claim he was castrated and blinded, and it is assumed that he did not survive long in captivity.

He was married to an unnamed daughter of Herman II, Count of Winzenburg and Lutgard of Salzwedel.
