= Sven =

- Pronunciation: Swedish: [ˈsvɛ̌nː]
- Gender: Male

Origin
- Origin: Old Norse
- Meaning: Young man young warrior

Other names
- Variant forms: Svend, Svein, Sveinn
- Related names: Svenja (female form)

Sven is a Scandinavian masculine given name. In Old Norse the meaning was "young man" or "servant", and the original Old Norse spelling was sveinn.

Variants such as Svend are found in Danish and Norwegian. Another variant, Svein, is used in Norway, the Low Countries, and German-speaking countries, and is cognate with the English surname Swain.

In medieval Swedish, sven or sven av vapen ("sven of arms"), is a term for squire. The female equivalent, Svenja, though seemingly Dutch and Scandinavian, is not common anywhere outside of German-speaking countries. Sven can also be spelled with a "w" – Swen – but is pronounced as Sven.

The Icelandic version is Sveinn (Icelandic pronunciation: [ˈsveitn̥]); the Faroese version is Sveinur (Faroese pronunciation: [ˈsvaiːnʊɹ]).

== Entertainment and music ==
- Sven Einar Englund (1916–1999), Finnish composer
- Sven Epiney (born 1972), Swiss television, radio host, and editor
- Sven Grünberg (born 1956), Estonian synthesizer and progressive rock composer and musician
- Sven August Körling (1842–1919), Swedish composer
- Sven Lõhmus (born 1972), Estonian composer, producer, and lyricist
- Sven Maes (born 1973), Belgian producer
- Sven Martin, German keyboardist and sound director
- Sven Nordström (1801–1887), Swedish organ builder
- Sven Regener (born 1961), German musician and writer
- Sven Sachsalber (1987–2020), Italian performance artist
- Sven-Bertil Taube (1934–2022), Swedish singer and actor
- Sven Väth (born 1964), German electronic music DJ/producer
- Sven Wollter (1934–2020), Swedish actor
- Sven van Veen (DJ Sven), one half of Dutch Hip Hop duo "MC Miker G & DJ Sven"

== Politics ==
- Sven Alkalaj (born 1948), Bosnian politician
- Sven Aspling (1912–2000), Swedish politician
- Sven Czekalla (born 1983), German politician
- Sven Hulterström (born 1938), Swedish politician
- Sven Franck (born 1976), German-French politician
- Sven Küntzel (born 1973), German politician
- Sven Lehmann (born 1979), German politician
- Sven Lindgren (born 1946), Swedish politician
- Sven Olov Lindholm (1903–1998), Swedish politician
- Sven Otto Littorin (born 1966), Swedish politician
- Sven Mikser (born 1973), Estonian politician
- Sven Ranck (1616–1684), Swedish statesman
- Sven Romanus (1906–2005), Swedish civil servant, Minister for Justice
- Sven Rosomkiewicz (born 1986), German politician
- Sven Rydenfelt (1911–2005), Swedish economist and political writer
- Sven Spengemann (born 1966), Canadian politician
- Sven Svensson (1636–1696), Swedish-American politician

== Sports ==
- Sven Andrighetto (born 1993), Swiss ice hockey player (playing in NHL)
- Sven Axbom (1926–2006), Swedish footballer
- Sven Bärtschi (born 1992), Swiss ice hockey player (playing in NHL Vancouver Canucks)
- Sven Barth (born 1980), German racing driver
- Sven Bender (born 1989), German footballer (playing in Borussia Dortmund)
- Sven Butenschön (born 1976), German ice hockey player
- Sven Erik Bystrøm (born 1992), Norwegian cyclist
- Sven Magnus Carlsen (born 1990), Norwegian chess Grandmaster
- Sven Coster (born 1978), Dutch sailor
- Sven Davidson (1928–2008), Swedish tennis player
- Sven-Göran Eriksson (1948–2024), Swedish football (soccer) manager
- Sven Fischer (born 1971), German biathlete
- Sven Habermann (born 1961), German-Canadian football (soccer) player
- Sven Hannawald (born 1974), German ski jumper
- Sven Kaldre (born 1991), Estonian basketball player
- Sven Kramer (born 1986), Dutch speed skater
- Sven Lindman (1942–2025), Swedish footballer
- Sven Loll (born 1964), East German judoka
- Sven Lundgren (1896–1960), Swedish athlete
- Sven Lundgren (decathlete) (1901–1982), Swedish decathlete
- Sven-Olof Lundgren (1908–1946), Swedish ski jumper
- Sven Meinhardt (born 1971), German field hockey player
- Sven Mikaelsson (born 1943), Swedish alpine skier
- Sven Nylander (born 1962), Swedish hurdler
- Sven Nys (born 1976), Belgian cyclist
- Sven Ottke (born 1967), German boxer
- Sven Riederer (born 1981), Swiss athlete
- Sven Rydell (1905–1975), Swedish footballer
- Sven Schultze (born 1978), German basketball player
- Sven Thorgren (born 1994), Swedish snowboarder
- Sven Tumba (1931–2011), Swedish ice hockey player
- Sven-Ole Thorsen (born 1944), Danish actor, stuntman, and athlete
- Sven Vermant (born 1973), Belgian footballer

== Other ==
- Sven Tito Achen (1922–1986), Argentine-Danish writer and author on heraldry
- Sven Allard (1896–1975), Swedish diplomat
- Sven Backlund (1917–1997), Swedish diplomat
- Sven Dahlvig, Swedish philatelist
- Sven Grafström (1902–1955), Swedish diplomat
- Sven Hassel (1917–2012), Danish-born soldier and writer
- Sven Hedin (1865–1952), Swedish explorer and geographer
- Sven O. Høiby (1936–2007), father of Mette-Marit, Crown Princess of Norway
- Sven Jaschan (born 1986), German computer programmer
- Sven Lidman (clergyman) (1786–1845), Swedish priest and Orientalist
- Sven Markelius (1889–1972), Swedish architect
- Sven Nykvist (1922–2006), Swedish cinematographer
- Sven Salander (1894–1965), Swedish Army lieutenant general

== Fictional characters ==
- Sven Hjerson, fictional Finnish detective
- "Svën Höek", an episode of The Ren & Stimpy Show
- Sven Holgersson, from the Voltron franchise
- Sven the Berserk, in the 1989 film Erik the Viking, played by Tim McInnerny
- Sven, the silent scorer sometimes appearing on the BBC radio show I'm Sorry I Haven't a Clue
- "Sven from Swiss Cottage", a character used by Peter Cook when participating in radio phone-ins
- Sven – Rogue Knight, one of the many heroes featured in the custom Warcraft III map Defense of the Ancients, and its sequel Dota 2
- Sven, in the Witches of East End novel series by Melissa de la Cruz
- Sven Dufva, main character in the poem "Sven Dufva" of The Tales of Ensign Stål, written by J. L. Runeberg
- Sven Cal Bayang, from Mobile Suit Gundam SEED C.E. 73: Stargazer
- Sven "The Governator", in the movie Cars, voiced by Jess Harnell
- Sven, from the Georgia Nicolson book series by Louise Rennison
- Sven, Kristoff's pet reindeer in the movie Frozen
- Sven, the name of a puffin in Happy Feet Two
- Sven, a Nord character in The Elder Scrolls V: Skyrim
- Sven and Ole, a character in a type of joke told by Scandinavian-Americans
- Sven Joergenson, Sven Pilson and Sven Johansson, from the series How I Met Your Mother
- Sven, the name of PewDiePie's pet wolf in his Minecraft YouTube series

== See also ==
- Son
- Swain (name)
- Swen
- Sweyn, a given name
- Swanson (surname)
- Svensson (son of Sven)
- Svante (name)
- Svendborg (city in Denmark)
- Swedenborg (Svendberg – surname)
