= Senator Swann =

Senator Swann may refer to:

- Art Swann (born 1952), Tennessee State Senate
- George T. Swann (1808–1877), Mississippi State Senate

== See also ==
- Senator Swan (disambiguation)
- Senator Swain (disambiguation)
