= Beverly White =

American politician (1928–2021)

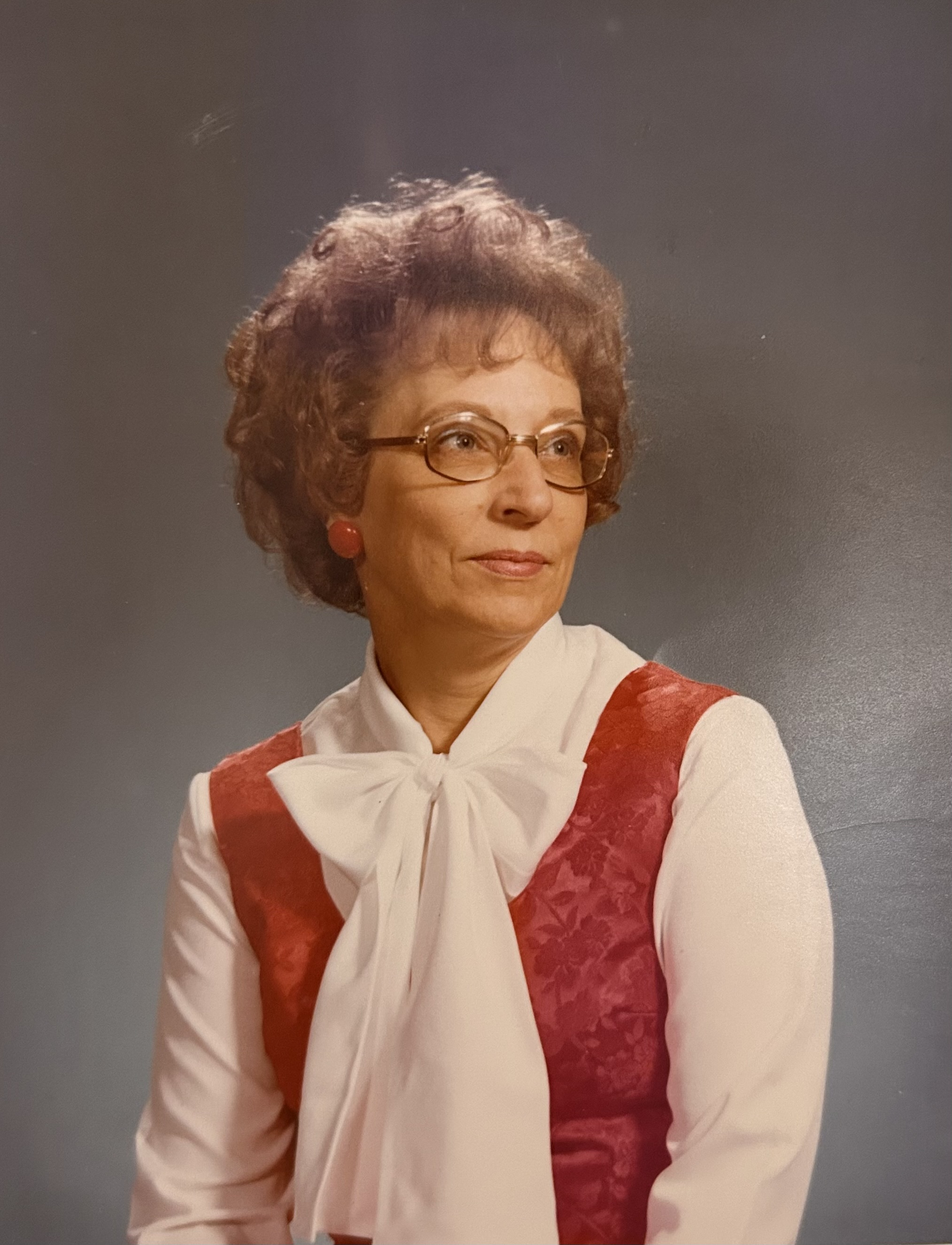
- White in 1970

Member of the Utah House of Representatives
- In office 1971–1991
- Preceded by: F. Chileon Halladay (57th district)
- Succeeded by: Merrill Nelson (21st district)
- Constituency: 57th district (1971–1973); 64th district (1973–1983); 21st district (1983–1991)

Personal details
- Born: Beverly Jean Larson; September 2, 1928 Salt Lake City, Utah, U.S.
- Died: May 24, 2021 (aged 92) Taylorsville, Utah, U.S.
- Party: Democratic
- Spouse: Marion Floyd White (m. 1945; died 2004)
- Children: 5

Beverly Jean White (née Larson; September 2, 1928 – May 24, 2021) was an American politician who served in the Utah House of Representatives for the 57th, 64th, or 21st districts from 1971 to 1991, as a member of the Democratic Party. The longest-serving consecutive female member of the Utah State Legislature as of her death, White held multiple positions in the Democratic Party at the local, state, and national levels and attended many state and national conventions.

Born in Salt Lake City and raised in Tooele, Utah, White was educated at Tooele High School. She entered politics with her involvement in the Tooele County Democratic Ladies Club and later became active in the Tooele County Democratic Party. White served as vice-chair of the Tooele County Democratic Party, secretary of the Utah Democratic Party for sixteen years, and on the Rules Committee of the Democratic National Committee. She was a delegate to multiple state conventions of the Utah Democratic Party and was a delegate to every Democratic National Convention from 1964 to 2004, with the exception of 1976 when she was an alternate delegate.

Governor Cal Rampton appointed White to the Utah Board of Pardons in 1965, her first public office. She was on the board until 1971, when she was appointed to fill a vacancy in the state house created by Representative F. Chileon Halladay's death. During her tenure in the state house, she served as assistant whip while in the majority and minority and was at times the only female chair of a committee. She served until she was defeated by Merrill Nelson in 1990. White also served on a hospital board, wrote a book about female legislators, and aided in the creation of a satellite campus for Utah State University.

== Early life ==
Beverly Jean Larson was born in Salt Lake City, Utah, on September 2, 1928, to Helen Sterzer and Gustave R. Larson. She was raised by her aunt Margret and uncle Dunn in Tooele, Utah, after her mother died from diabetes on September 17, 1941. Her father married Margaret Vernon on November 10, 1941, and remained with her until her death in 1958; he died in 1978.

Larson graduated from Webster Elementary School and Tooele High School, where she was the secretary of the student government. She became engaged to Marion Floyd White in 1945, and they married at the Salt Lake Temple on April 8, 1947. They had five children and remained married until his death in 2004. Her husband was elected to the Tooele city council in the 1950s and she aided Bish White, her father-in-law, in being elected as sheriff of Tooele County. White was a member of The Church of Jesus Christ of Latter-day Saints. She worked at the army depot in Tooele for the United States Army Corps of Engineers, at JCPenney, and as an assistant county clerk for fourteen years.

== Political career ==
=== Appointments and party politics ===
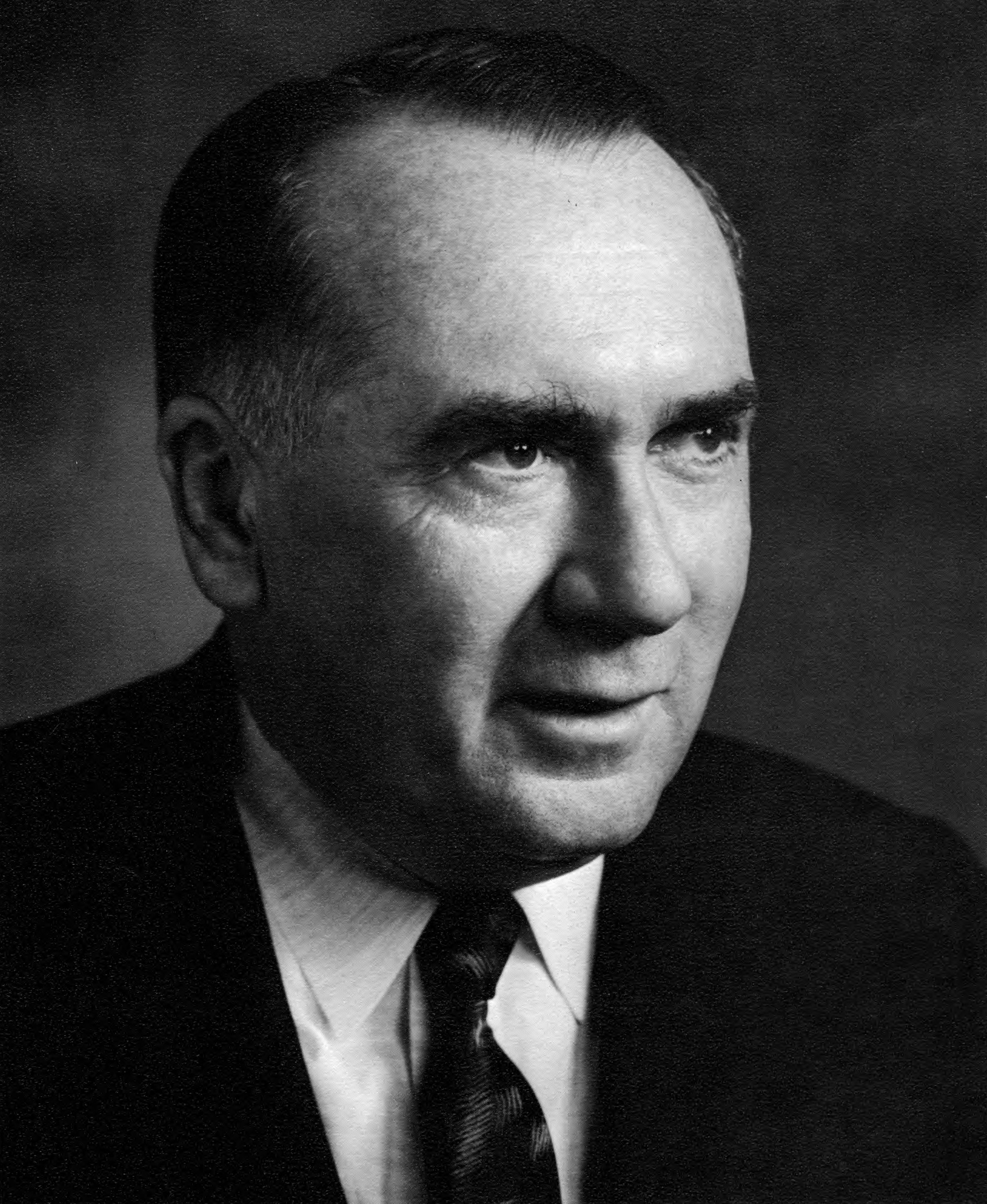
White was appointed to the Utah Board of Pardons and the Utah House of Representatives by Governor Cal Rampton.

White was elected as president of the Tooele County Democratic Ladies Club in 1959, and was vice-chair of the Tooele County Democratic Party during the 1960s. She was a delegate to the Utah Democratic Party's state convention multiple times. From 1971 to 1987, she was the secretary of the Utah Democratic Party before she was defeated by D'Arcy Dixon.

White attended every Democratic National Convention as a delegate from 1964 to 2004, with the exception of the 1976 convention. During the 1968 Democratic presidential primary she served as an uncommitted delegate as a member of Utah's delegation to that year's convention. The Utah delegation at the 1972 convention selected White to be its secretary and she served on the Rules Committee of the Democratic National Committee. She was an uncommitted alternate delegate to the 1976 convention and a delegate for U.S. Senator Ted Kennedy at the 1980 convention. In 1984, she was one of two uncommitted delegates; she voted for Gary Hart, as did 18 of the other delegates from Utah; the remaining 8 supported Walter Mondale. She was the oldest member of Utah's delegation to the 1996 and 2000 conventions.

White was a member of the Juvenile Court Advisory Board. In 1965, she was appointed by Governor Cal Rampton and approved by the Utah Senate to serve on the Utah Board of Pardons for the Utah State Prison for a six-year term. She was the first female member of the board, but left in 1971 to take a seat in the Utah House of Representatives.

After Representative Allan Turner Howe was convicted of soliciting sex during the 1976 United States House of Representatives election, White and other Democratic Party leaders called for Howe to withdraw from the election so as to not hurt the other candidates' chances and so a replacement appointment could be made. Howe did not withdraw from the race and was defeated by Republican nominee David Daniel Marriott.

=== Utah House of Representatives ===
==== Elections ====
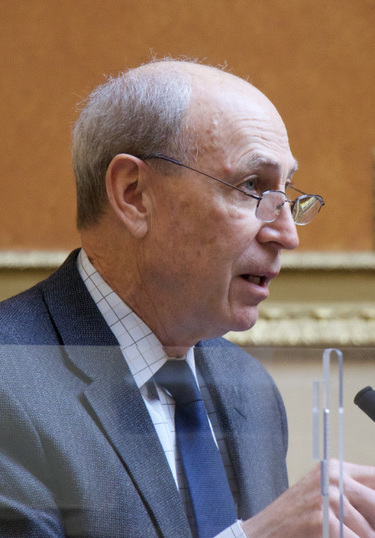
White lost reelection to the Utah House of Representatives to Republican nominee Merrill Nelson (pictured in 2021) after serving for twenty years.

Representative F. Chileon Halladay, who had served six terms in the Utah House of Representatives, died from bronchial pneumonia on March 4, 1971. Governor Rampton appointed White to fill the vacancy in the 57th district in the state house on March 8. She served in the state house for twenty years, making her the longest-serving consecutive female member of the Utah State Legislature as of her death.

White won election to the 64th district in 1972 against Clarence Hansen, a write-in candidate and Latter Day Saints bishop. During the election she participated in a 27-mile hike with U.S. Representative Wayne Owens. She defeated Republican nominees Carolyn Palmer, vice-chair of the Tooele County Republican Party, in 1974, Phyllis Dunn in 1978, and Douglas Christensen, president of the Tooele County Chamber of Commerce, in 1980. There was no opposition to her in 1976. The 64th district was located entirely within Tooele County, with the remainder of the county represented by the 63rd district.

During the 1982 election, White ran against Representative John E. Smith in the Democratic primary, as both of them moved into the 21st district due to redistricting. The 21st district was also located entirely within Tooele County and contained the majority of its population and area, with the remainder being represented by the 1st district. White defeated Smith at the Tooele County Democratic Convention, winning 72 delegates to Smith's 23, which was above the seventy percent required to prevent a primary. She again defeated Smith, who ran a write-in campaign, in the general election. White faced no opposition in the 1984, 1986, and 1988 elections.

White declined to run for Karl Swan's seat in the state senate from the 13th district in the 1990 election as she wanted to maintain her seniority. She lost reelection to Republican nominee Merrill Nelson, who received over sixty percent of the vote. At one of their debates, Nelson criticized her for being the "most liberal" member of the state house, for her support for abortion rights, and for the high number of legislative votes that she was absent for. Although White lost her seat, the Democratic Party increased their representation in the state house by four seats. The Salt Lake Tribune stated that White had been harmed by hospital management controversies.

==== Tenure ====
During White's tenure in the state house, she served as chair of the Social Services committee and as a member of the Local Government and Consumer Affairs committees. At times, she was the only woman to chair a committee. White served as treasurer of the National Order of Women Legislators. In 1974, she was one of six women serving in the Utah state government alongside Georgia Peterson, Milly Bernard, Mary Lorraine Johnson, Nellie Jack, and Rita Urie.

White held the position of assistant majority whip from 1975 to 1976, and assistant minority whip from 1977 to 1978. She ran for the position of Minority Whip in 1980, but was defeated by Representative John Garr. White ran for the position of Minority Leader in 1982, but was defeated by Representative Mike Dmitrich. She sought the position of Minority Whip in 1984, but Representative Blaze Wharton was given the position instead. In 1986, she was selected to serve on the Management Committee which was the fourth-highest position in the minority leadership.

White served as secretary of the Tooele County Council of Governments and the Tooele County Planning Commission in the 1970s. She was appointed to the Utah Health Planning Council in 1979. She received the Susa Young Gates Award in 1978. The National Association of Social Workers named her as legislator of the year in 1981 due to her work on committees related to social services. From 1986 to 1993, she was a member of the Governor's Commission on the Status of Women. She was named as the woman of the year by the Central Women Club of Utah in 1982.

In 1987, Attorney General David L. Wilkinson filed a lawsuit which stated that the separations of powers clause in Article 5, Section 1 of the Constitution of Utah would prohibit White, Mont Evans, and Janet Rose from holding jobs in the state government while being in the state legislature. White's job in the Utah Department of Social Services was to find community service jobs for drunk drivers. Governor Norman H. Bangerter refused to issue an ultimatum requested by Wilkinson demanding that the legislators either resign from the legislature or be fired, believing that the Utah Supreme Court was responsible for settling the matter. On February 23, the Utah Supreme Court ruled in a unanimous decision written by Justice Richard C. Howe that the legislators could retain their seats. Wilkinson filed another case against Evans and Rose in the 3rd district court, but excluded White. White had hired her own attorney while Evans and Rose were represented by the Utah Public Employees Association. The state legislature voted to allot $10,000 (equivalent to $28,000 in 2025) for White's legal fees.

== Later life ==
White served on the Tooele Valley Medical Center Special Service District Board until 1993, including as the board's chair from 1989 to 1991. The Family Practice Group (FPG) owed $50,000 to the Tooele Valley Medical Center for laboratory services and maintenance to the FPG building, but the FPG requested lenient terms or the cancellation of the debt. Jay Spector, the medical staff president of the Tooele Valley Medical Center, resigned, stating that he could not work with Scott Blakley, who opposed the FPG's debt requests. White also offered to resign from the position of chair in 1989, due to the controversy involving the debt, but the board voted to show confidence in her. Despite not wanting to serve on the board again, she was unanimously selected for another term in 1990. She declined another term in 1991 (despite having been renominated), and was selected to serve as secretary.

On January 22, 1991, White and five other people were selected by forty delegates as candidates to replace Bill Pitt on the Tooele County Commission, but Edwin St. Clair was selected by the commission to fill the vacancy. The two Republican members of the county commission were critical of the six proposed candidates, with Commissioner Teryl Hunsaker stating that the Democrats did not take the opportunity to select "clean, fresh blood to bring a new perspective into the system".

White helped establish the Children's Justice Center in Tooele and worked for the Tooele Adult Probation and Parole Office. White was also as a member of the Governor's Commission on the Status of Women from 1986 to 1993.

White wrote Women Legislators of Utah, 1896–1993, a book about women who served in the state government. The American Association of University Women named White as the distinguished woman of the year for 1996 to 1997. She aided in the creation of a satellite university for Utah State University in Tooele by obtaining appropriations and serving on its advisory board; the university later gave her an honorary doctorate degree in 2017. That same year, she worked for the election of Debbie Winn, the first female mayor of Tooele. White died in Taylorsville, Utah, on May 24, 2021.

== Political positions ==
=== Abortion ===
During the 1970s, White supported making abortion laws more restrictive, but by 1990, she supported abortion rights. In 1977, White voted against a resolution calling for a constitutional convention to amend the Constitution of the United States to ban abortion, while the state house voted in favour 55 to 5. White opposed clauses in an act of the state legislature which would require women seeking abortions to see photographs of dead fetuses, saying they were "pornographic" and that anyone who sent them through the mail would be arrested. White, who attended the World Conference on Women in 1985, served as a representative for Planned Parenthood to the World Conference on Women in 1995.

=== Capital punishment ===
The Supreme Court of the United States ruled in 1972 that capital punishment was unconstitutional in Furman v. Georgia, ending the usage of capital punishment in the United States until the Gregg v. Georgia ruling in 1976. White supported the restoration of capital punishment in Utah and it became the first state to resume executions in the United States.

=== Economics ===
White voted against an income tax refund in 1979, and blamed it for budgetary problems. In 1980, she supported the idea of eliminating the sales tax, but not while the state was undergoing budget problems. She sponsored legislation in 1981 that equalized the income tax rate that single people and married couples paid. She was critical of budget cuts made in 1981 that affected the Department of Corrections, Medicaid, and psychiatric patient care.

=== Equal Rights Amendment ===
In 1973, when the Utah state house voted 51 to 20 against ratifying the Equal Rights Amendment, White was one of the representatives who voted in favor. She sponsored another attempt to ratify the Equal Rights Amendment in 1975. She called for members of the state legislature to not vote on the amendment based on their religion, referring to the Church of Jesus Christ of Latter-day Saints' opposition to the amendment. Utah is one of twelve states that had not ratified the Equal Rights Amendment, as of 2021.

=== Women's rights ===
White and five other female members of the Utah state legislature wrote to Superintendent of Public Instruction Walter D. Talbot to investigate sex discrimination in educational hiring practices. In 1979, Representatives White, Joan R. Turner, Lucille G. Taylor, and Senator Frances Farley praised Governor Scott M. Matheson for appointing a woman, Phyllis C. Southwick, to the state house. When the state house voted to abolish the Governor's Commission on the Status of Women in 1980, White and all other female members of the state house voted against the measure. White was endorsed for reelection in the 1990 election by the National Organization for Women.

== Electoral history ==
1972 Utah House of Representatives 64th district election
Party	Candidate	Votes	%	±%
Democratic	Beverly White (incumbent)	4,059	84.37%	
Independent	Clarence Hansen (write-in)	752	15.63%	+15.63%
Total votes		4,811	100.00%	

1974 Utah House of Representatives 64th district election
Party	Candidate	Votes	%	±%
Democratic	Beverly White (incumbent)	3,326	66.71%	−17.66%
Republican	Carolyn Palmer	1,660	33.29%	+33.29%
Total votes		4,986	100.00%	

1976 Utah House of Representatives 64th district election
Party	Candidate	Votes	%	±%
Democratic	Beverly White (incumbent)	4,517	100.00%	+33.29%
Total votes		4,517	100.00%	

1978 Utah House of Representatives 64th district election
Party	Candidate	Votes	%	±%
Democratic	Beverly White (incumbent)	2,572	65.35%	−34.65%
Republican	Phyllis Dunn	1,364	34.65%	+34.65%
Total votes		3,936	100.00%	

1980 Utah House of Representatives 64th district election
Party	Candidate	Votes	%	±%
Democratic	Beverly White (incumbent)	3,280	56.30%	−9.05%
Republican	Douglas Christensen	2,546	43.70%	+9.05%
Total votes		5,826	100.00%	

1982 Utah House of Representatives 21st district Democratic nomination convention
Party	Candidate	Votes	%	±%
Democratic	Beverly White (incumbent)	72	75.79%	
Democratic	John E. Smith (incumbent)	23	24.21%	
Total votes		95	100.00%	

1982 Utah House of Representatives 21st district election
Party	Candidate	Votes	%	±%
Democratic	Beverly White (incumbent)	3,524	53.41%	−2.89%
Independent	John E. Smith (incumbent) (write-in)	3,074	46.59%	+46.59%
Total votes		6,598	100.00%	

1984 Utah House of Representatives 21st district election
Party	Candidate	Votes	%	±%
Democratic	Beverly White (incumbent)	5,290	100.00%	+46.59%
Total votes		6,598	100.00%	

1985 Utah Democratic Party secretary election
Party	Candidate	Votes	%	±%
Democratic	Beverly White (incumbent)	457	68.52%	
Democratic	Gary Bowen	210	31.48%	
Total votes		667	100.00%	

1986 Utah House of Representatives 21st district election
Party	Candidate	Votes	%	±%
Democratic	Beverly White (incumbent)	4,277	100.00%	+0.00%
Total votes		4,277	100.00%	

1987 Utah Democratic Party secretary election
Party	Candidate	Votes	%	±%
Democratic	D'Arcy Dixon	333	62.48%	
Democratic	Beverly White (incumbent)	200	37.52%	
Total votes		533	100.00%	

1988 Utah House of Representatives 21st district election
Party	Candidate	Votes	%	±%
Democratic	Beverly White (incumbent)	5,284	100.00%	+0.00%
Total votes		5,284	100.00%	

1990 Utah House of Representatives 21st district election
Party	Candidate	Votes	%	±%
Republican	Merrill Nelson	4,016	66.74%	+66.74%
Democratic	Beverly White (incumbent)	2,001	33.26%	−66.74%
Total votes		6,017	100.00%	

== Works cited ==
- White, Beverly; Abbott, Delila (1993). Women Legislators of Utah, 1896–1993. Governor's Commission for Women and Families.
