= Orm Ivarsson =

Orm Ivarsson, often called Orm Kongsbror (King's Brother), died 1184, was a magnate and military commander in Norway during the civil war era. He was the son of Ivar Sneis, a chieftain from Opplandene, and Ingrid Ragnvaldsdottir, originally a Swedish princess who had also been a Norwegian queen. He received the epithet "Kongsbror" because, through his mother Ingrid, he was the half-brother of King Inge Haraldsson (Crouchback). Orm was an important ally for his brother Inge, and later for King Magnus Erlingsson.

== Background ==
Orm's mother Ingrid was the widow of King Harald Gille. Harald was Inge's father. The relationship between Ingrid and Orm's father Ivar must have taken place some time after Harald's death in 1136, but before his mother's marriage to Ottar Birting in 1146. It is therefore likely that Orm was born around 1140, but his exact year or place of birth is not known. His parents do not appear to have been married, and as far as we know had no other children together. His mother Ingrid was later married to Arne Ivarsson, with whom she had, among others, the son Nicholas Arnesson. Nicholas later became known as Bishop of Oslo and a leader of the Bagler Party.

There is little information about Orm's father Ivar Sneis, but he was probably a chieftain from Opplandene. Sverris saga states that he had his relatives there.

In 1161, Orm was engaged to Ragna Nikolasdatter, widow of King Øystein Haraldsson, who was Inge's paternal half-brother. It is not known if they actually married. Orm had a son, Ivar Steig, but there is no information about his mother.

Orm lived during the civil war era in Norway (1130-1240), a period when various pretenders to the throne and political factions fought for the Norwegian crown. His brother Inge was first in conflict with his brothers Sigurd and Øystein Haraldsson, and then with his nephew (Sigurd's son) Håkon Herdebrei.

== With King Inge ==
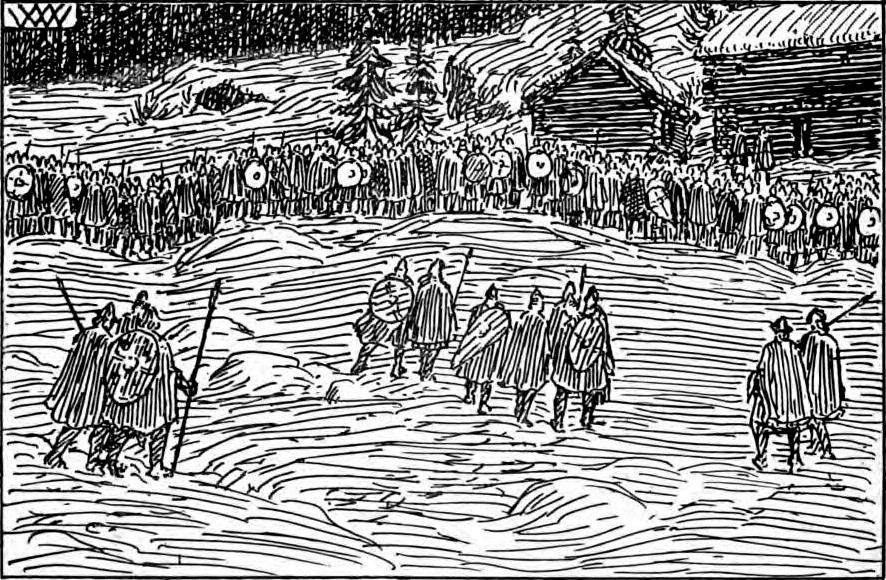
Inges army gathering outside Oslo

The first time Orm is mentioned in the sources is in the winter of 1161. At that time, he was a young man in his early 20s and was part of his brother Inge's army. They were staying in Oslo, where a wedding between Orm and Ragna was planned. However, Inge and his forces were attacked by Håkon Herdebrei and his army. In the ensuing battle on the ice outside Ekeberg king Inge was killed. Orm kept fighting after his brother's death, but in the end had to accept defeat and fled. Håkon and his men pillaged all the wedding provisions and several valuables. It is not known if Orm and Ragna were wedded before the battle or if they married at a later time. Orm then traveled to Sweden, to his half-brother Magnus Henriksson, his mother's son with the Danish prince Henrik Skadelår.

== With King Magnus ==
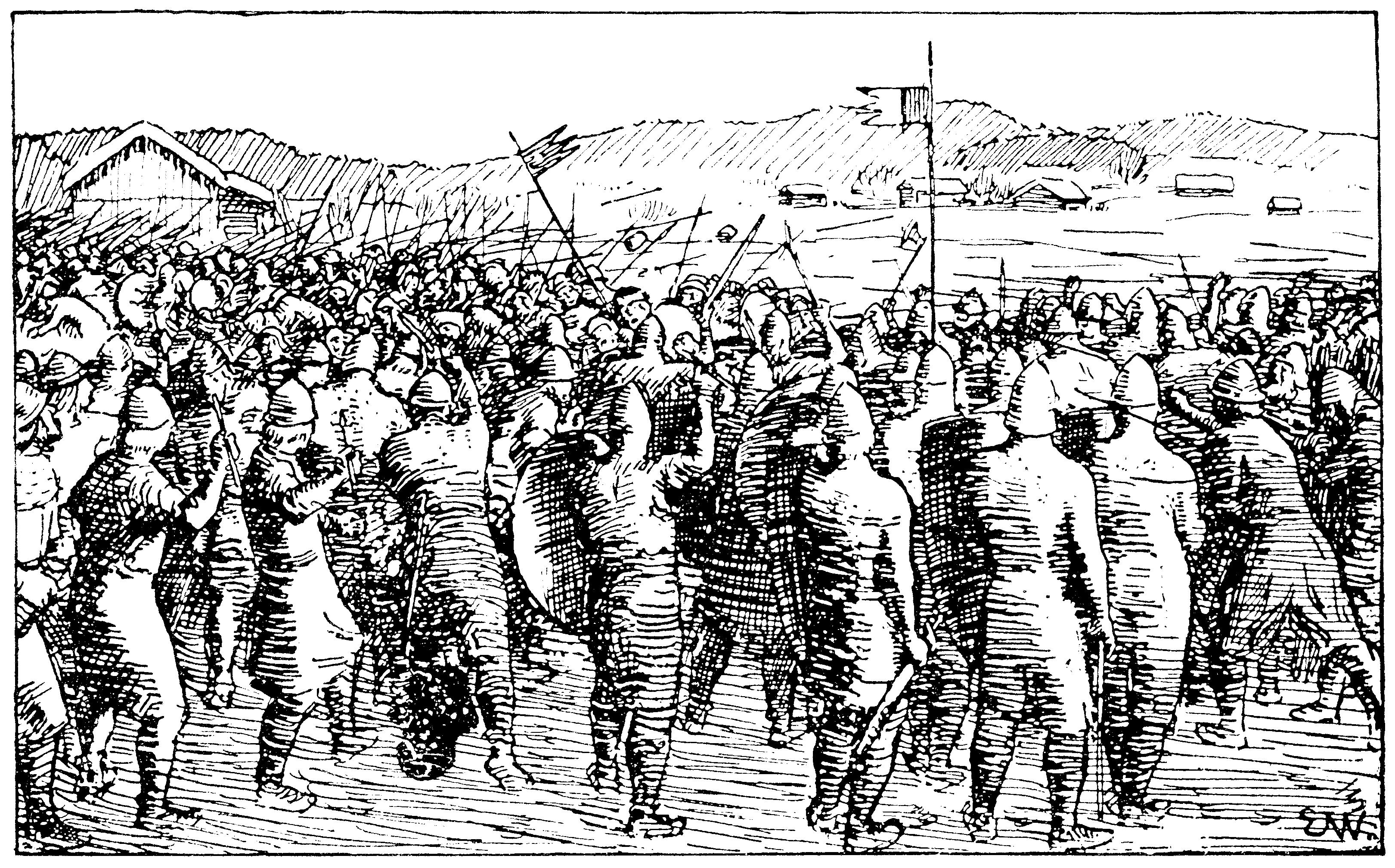
The battle at Re

The following year, Orm was back in Norway, now as a military commander for a new king, Magnus Erlingsson, and his father Erling Skakke. For the next 20 years, Orm was central to the defense of Viken and Opplandene against Magnus' opponents. Magnus (or rather his father) first defeated Haakon Herdebrei, and then Sigurd Markusfostre (both sons of Inge's brother Sigurd). The victory over the Birkebeiner and Eystein Meyla in the Battle of Re in Vestfold in 1177 is the first battle where Magnus is recorded as leading a battle independent of his father. Orm was present here.

However, Orm and Magnus had to continue the fight against the Birkebeiner, now led by King Sverre Sigurdsson. In the Battle of Fimreite in Sogn in 1184, both King Magnus and Orm, as well as Orm's son Ivar, were killed by King Sverre's forces.

Orm's body was found shortly after the battle and was moved to Oslo, where he was buried in St. Hallvard's Cathedral. Orm's brother Inge was also buried here.
