= Sweyn of Denmark =

Sweyn of Denmark may refer to:

- Sweyn Forkbeard (960–1014), King of Denmark, England, and Norway as Sweyn I.
- Sweyn Knutsson (1016–1035), son of Cnut the Great.
- Sweyn II of Denmark (1019–1074/76), King of Denmark
- Sweyn the Crusader (1050–1097), son of Sweyn II
- Svend Tronkræver (d. 1104), son of Sweyn II, potential claimant to Danish throne
- Sweyn III of Denmark (1125–1157), King of Denmark
