= Swain =

Swain, Swains or Swain's may refer to:

== Places ==
- Swain Islands, Antarctica
- Swain's Island (Newfoundland and Labrador), Canada
- Swains Island, an atoll in the Tokelau chain, American Samoa
- Swain County, North Carolina, United States
- Swains Lake, New Hampshire, United States

== Other uses ==
- Swain (surname)
- Swain (horse), a European Thoroughbred racehorse
- Swain School of Design, a former non-profit educational institution now part of the University of Massachusetts Dartmouth

== See also ==
- Sweyn, a Scandinavian given name
