= Dahlvig =

Dahlvig is a surname. Notable people with the surname include:

- Anders Dahlvig (born 1957), Swedish businessman
- Sven Dahlvig, Swedish philatelist
