= Canute Henriksen =

Duke of Southern Jutland
- Tenure: 1157-1162
- Born: ca. 1130
- Died: 12 March 1162
- House: Estridsen
- Father: Henrik Skadelår
- Mother: Ingrid Ragnvaldsdotter

Canute Henriksen (c. 1130 to 12 March 1162) was a Duke of Southern Jutland from 1157 to 1162. He was the son of Henrik Skadelår and a descendant of king Sweyn Estridsen. His mother was Ingrid Ragnvaldsdotter the granddaughter of king Inge I of Sweden. Two of his brothers became kings, Inge Krokrygg in Norway (1136-1161) and Magnus Henriksson in Sweden (1160-1161).

Canute fought in the Danish Civil War on the side of Canute V, who made him Duke of Southern Jutland. A title he had to fight for against his rival Valdemar the Great, who had been styled duke by Sweyn III. Canute initially had to give up his title, but when Valdemar became king the two reconciled and Canute was reinstated as duke.

He died without issue in 1162, and was succeeded by his brother Buris Henriksen.
