= Svenja =

Svenja is a feminine given name used in German-speaking countries. Notable people with the first name Svenja are:

- Svenja Adolphs, British linguist
- Svenja Bazlen (born 1984), German triathlete
- Svenja van Beek, a member of Dutch pop group Frisz
- Svenja Fölmli (born 2002), Swiss footballer
- Svenja Hahn (born 1989), German politician
- Svenja Heesch, German botanist
- Svenja Huber (born 1985), German handball player
- Svenja Huth (born 1991), German footballer
- Svenja Jung (born 1993), German actress
- Svenja Pages (born 1966), German television actress
- Svenja Schulze (born 1968), German politician and federal minister
- Svenja Stadler (born 1976), German politician
- Svenja Voigt (born 2004), German ice hockey player
- Svenja Weger (born 1993), German sailor
- Svenja Weidemann (born 1980), German professional tennis player
- Svenja Würth (born 1993), German ski jumper
