= Brett Swain =

Brett Swain may refer to:

- Brett Swain (actor), Australian actor
- Brett Swain (gridiron football) (born 1985), Canadian football wide receiver
- Brett Swain (cricketer) (born 1974), Australian cricketer
