= Boron, California =

- unincorporated community census-designated place
- Location in Kern County and the state of California

- Location in the United States Boron, California (California) Boron, California (southern California)
- Coordinates: 35°00′25″N 117°40′02″W
- Country: United States
- State: California
- County: Kern

Government
  - State senator: Shannon Grove (R)
  - Assemblymember: Tom Lackey (R)
  - U. S. rep.: Jay Obernolte (R)

Area
  - Total: 13.72 sq mi (35.54 km^{2})
  - Land: 13.71 sq mi (35.52 km^{2})
  - Water: 0.0077 sq mi (0.02 km^{2}) 0.15%
- Elevation: 2,520 ft (770 m)

Population (2020)
  - Total: 2,086
  - Density: 152.1/sq mi (58.73/km^{2})
- Time zone: UTC-8 (PST)
  - Summer (DST): UTC-7 (PDT)
- ZIP codes: 93516, 93596
- Area codes: 442/760
- FIPS code: 06-07568
- GNIS feature ID: 2407886

Boron (formerly Amargo, Baker, Borate, and Kern) is an unincorporated community in Kern County, California, United States. Boron is 15 miles (24 km) southwest of Red Rock Mountain at an elevation of 2,467 feet (752 m). For statistical purposes, the United States Census Bureau has defined Boron as a census-designated place (CDP). The population was 2,086 at the 2020 census, up from 2,025 at the 2000 census. Boron is named after the element boron and is the site of the world's largest source of the boron compound boric acid.

Boron is on the western edge of the Mojave Desert. Within a half day's drive one can view the highest and lowest points in the contiguous 48 states of the United States (Mount Whitney and Death Valley), the world's oldest tree, the bristlecone pine, and the cities of Los Angeles and Las Vegas.

Boron is home to the Rio Tinto Borax Mine, California's largest open-pit mine, which is also the largest borax mine in the world.

== Geography ==
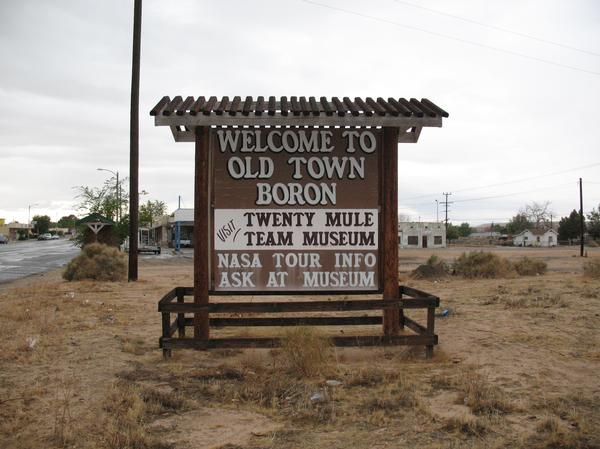
Old Town Boron sign

Boron is on the border of Kern and San Bernardino Counties along State Route 58. Boron is 65 miles (105 km) north of Palmdale, 85 miles (137 km) east of Bakersfield, and 40 miles (64 km) west of Barstow in the Antelope Valley region of California's Mojave Desert. According to the United States Census Bureau, the CDP has a total area of 13.82 square miles (35.8 km^{2}), over 99 percent of which is land.

== Demographics ==
Historical population
Census	Pop.	Note	%±
1970	1,999		—
1980	2,040		2.1%
1990	2,101		3.0%
2000	2,025		−3.6%
2010	2,253		11.3%
2020	2,086		−7.4%
U.S. Decennial Census; 1860–1870 1880-1890; 1900 1910 1920; 1930 1940 1950; 1960 1970 1980; 1990 2000 2010; 2020

Boron first appeared as an unincorporated place in the 1970 U.S. census; and as a census designated place in the 1980 United States census.

=== Racial and ethnic composition ===
Boron CDP, California – Racial and ethnic composition Note: the US Census treats Hispanic/Latino as an ethnic category. This table excludes Latinos from the racial categories and assigns them to a separate category. Hispanics/Latinos may be of any race.
Race / Ethnicity (NH = Non-Hispanic)	Pop 2000	Pop 2010	Pop 2020	% 2000	% 2010	% 2020
White alone (NH)	1,644	1,532	1,145	81.19%	68.00%	54.89%
Black or African American alone (NH)	45	158	167	2.22%	7.01%	8.01%
Native American or Alaska Native alone (NH)	47	40	28	2.32%	1.78%	1.34%
Asian alone (NH)	32	44	44	1.58%	1.95%	2.11%
Native Hawaiian or Pacific Islander alone (NH)	2	4	5	0.10%	0.18%	0.24%
Other race alone (NH)	10	1	11	0.49%	0.04%	0.53%
Mixed race or Multiracial (NH)	62	68	144	3.06%	3.02%	6.90%
Hispanic or Latino (any race)	183	406	542	9.04%	18.02%	25.98%
Total	2,025	2,253	2,086	100.00%	100.00%	100.00%

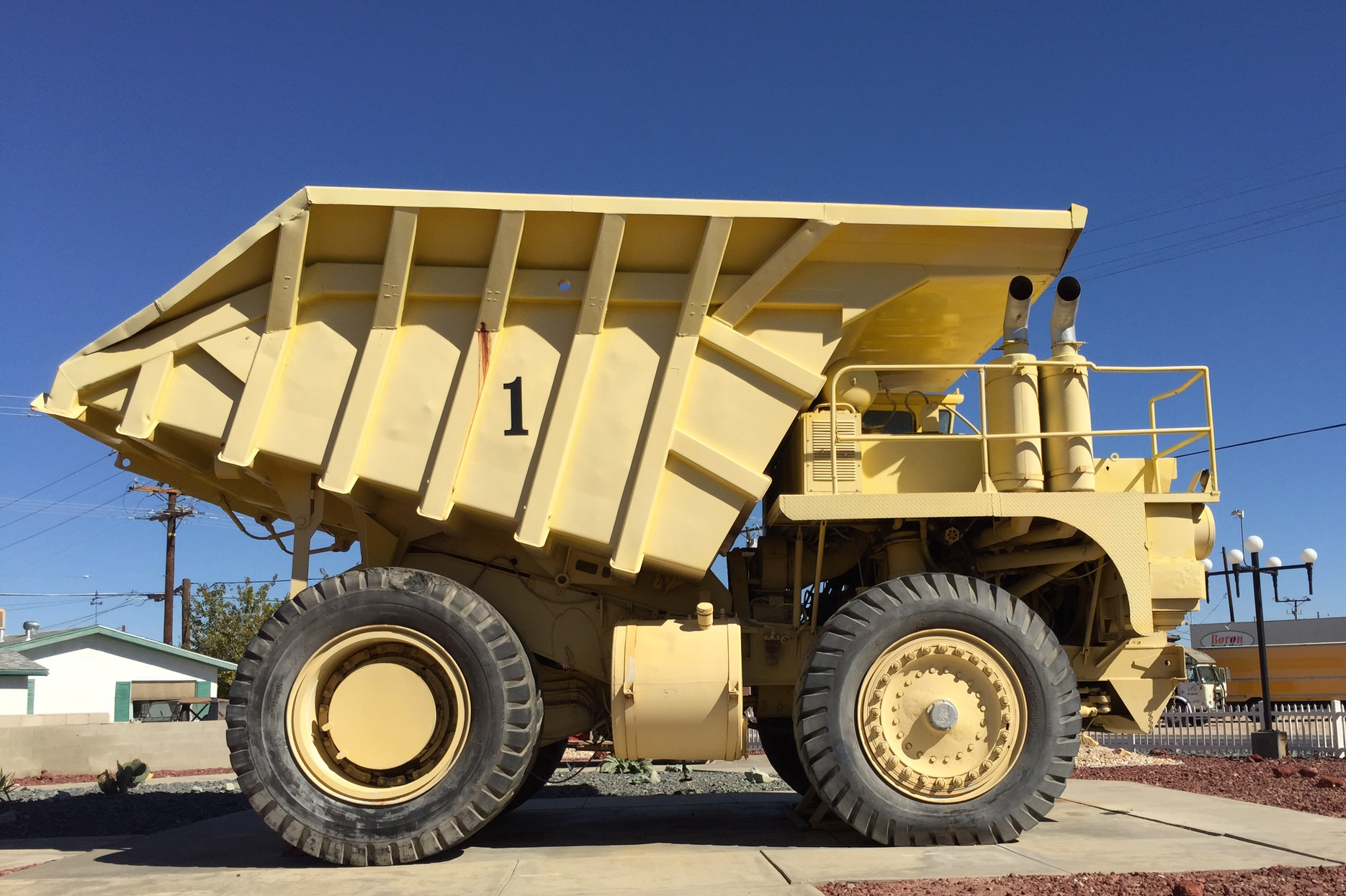
Old Ore Truck on display, Borax Visitor Center, Boron

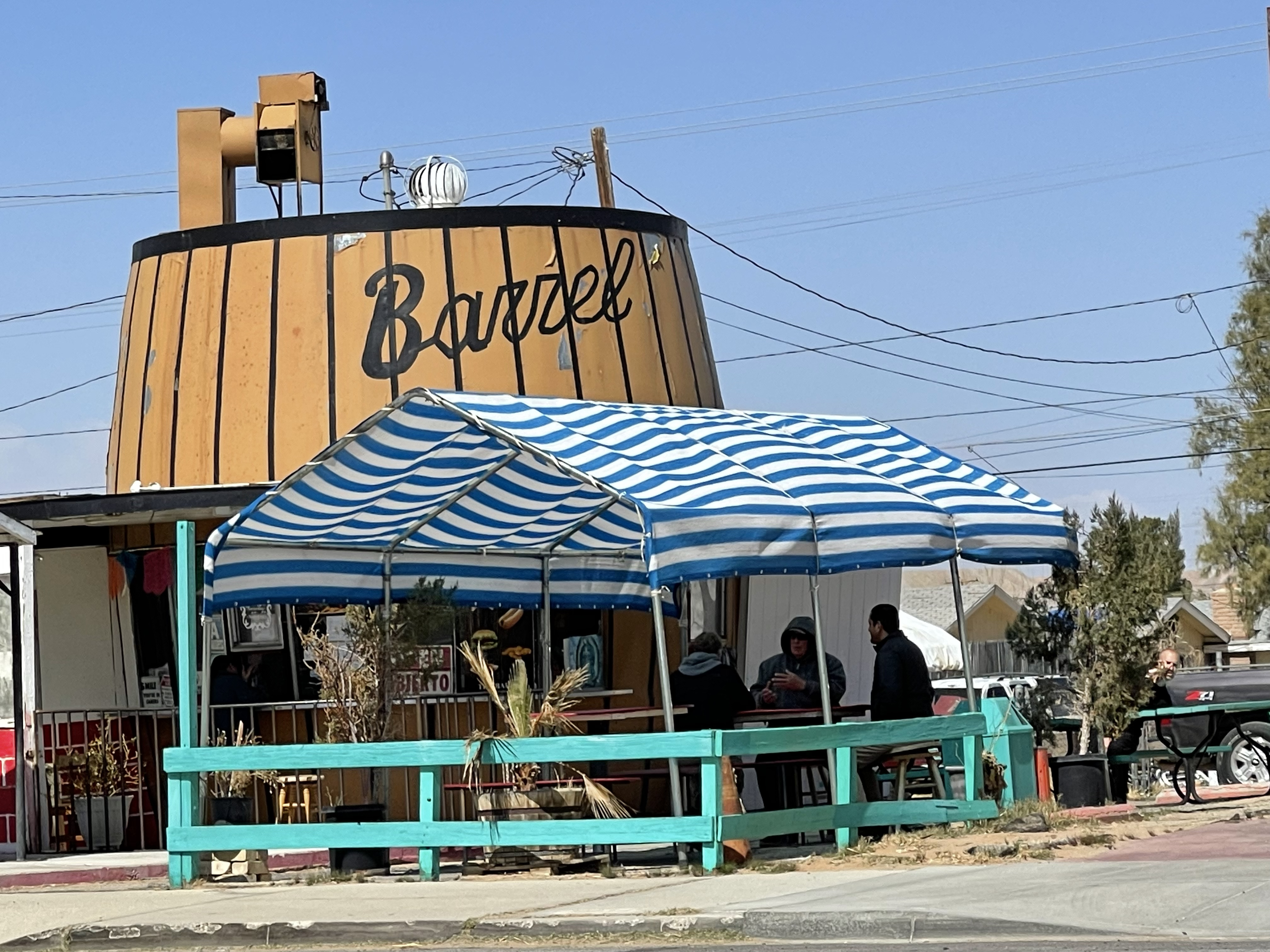
The Barrel restaurant in 2022.

=== 2020 census ===
As of the 2020 census, Boron had a population of 2,086. The population density was 152.1 inhabitants per square mile (58.7/km^{2}). The whole population lived in households. 0.0% of residents lived in urban areas, while 100.0% lived in rural areas.

There were 831 households, out of which 28.5% included children under the age of 18, 37.4% were married-couple households, 6.7% were cohabiting couple households, 29.7% had a female householder with no partner present, and 26.1% had a male householder with no partner present. 31.8% of households were one person, and 13.7% were one person aged 65 or older. The average household size was 2.51. There were 517 families (62.2% of all households). There were 1,051 housing units, of which 20.9% were vacant. Of occupied units, 52.7% were owner-occupied, and 47.3% were occupied by renters. The homeowner vacancy rate was 2.1% and the rental vacancy rate was 16.5%.

The age distribution was 26.1% under the age of 18, 7.7% aged 18 to 24, 22.0% aged 25 to 44, 27.7% aged 45 to 64, and 16.5% who were 65 years of age or older. The median age was 39.3 years. For every 100 females, there were 104.9 males, and for every 100 females age 18 and over, there were 100.5 males age 18 and over.

The racial makeup of Boron was 62.0% White, 8.5% African American, 2.3% Native American, 2.3% Asian, 0.4% Pacific Islander, 9.8% from other races, and 14.7% from two or more races. Hispanic or Latino of any race were 26.0% of the population.

=== Income and poverty ===
In 2023, the US Census Bureau estimated that the median household income was $61,607, and the per capita income was $27,933. About 25.0% of families and 31.3% of the population were below the poverty line.

== History ==
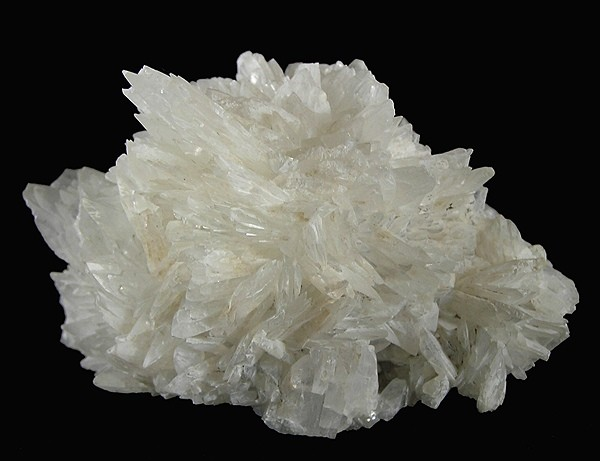
Colemanite from the Boron mine. Size: 6.9 x 5.4 x 5.4 cm.

Borate evaporites in the form of colemanite was first reported in 1913 during drilling of a water well. Claims were acquired by the Pacific Coast Borax Company and exploration continued. In 1925 commercial colemanite production began. In the 1920s and 30s borates were produced from the Baker and West Baker mines.

The first post office at Boron opened in 1938.

== Industry ==
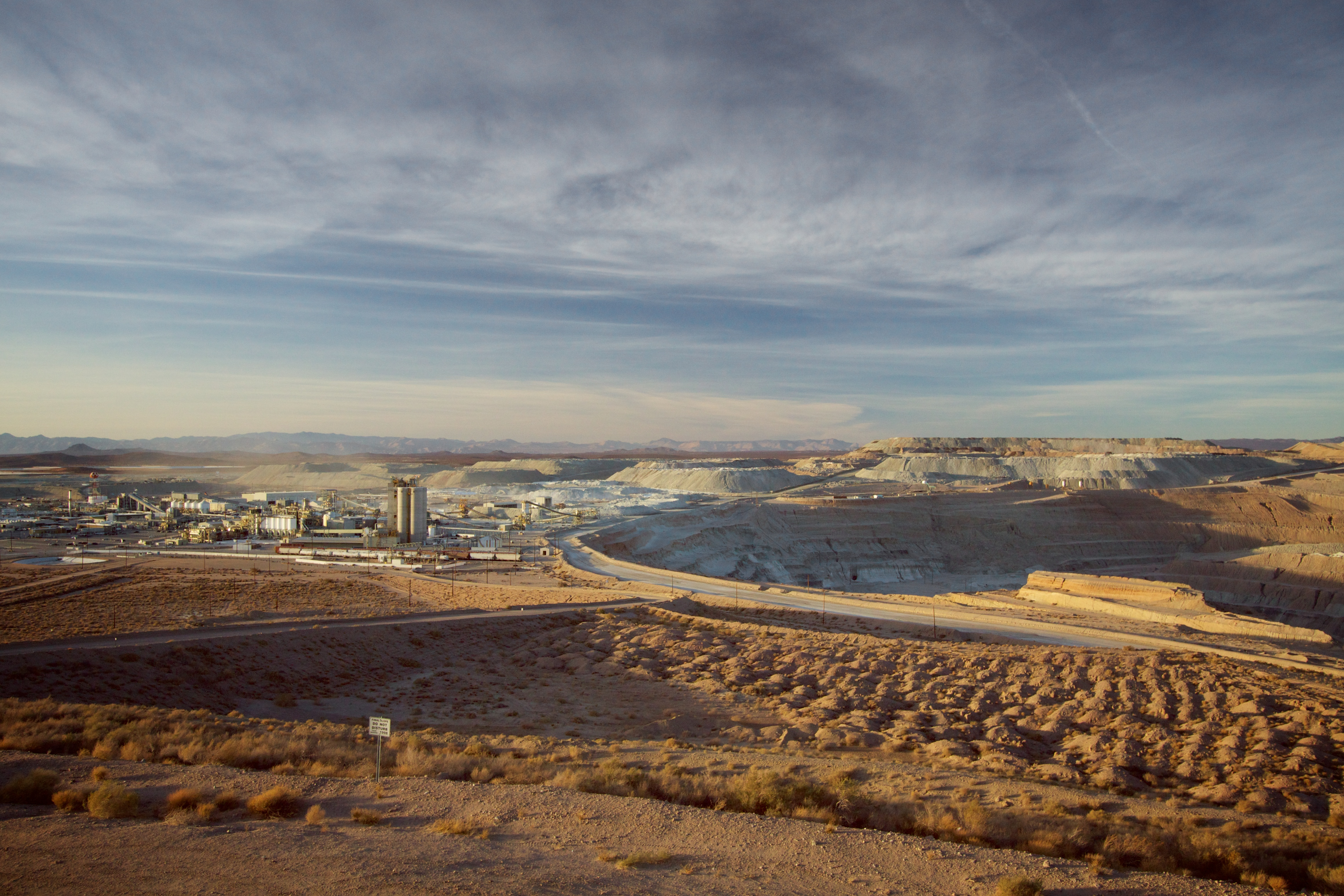
Rio Tinto Boron mine and plant, 2012

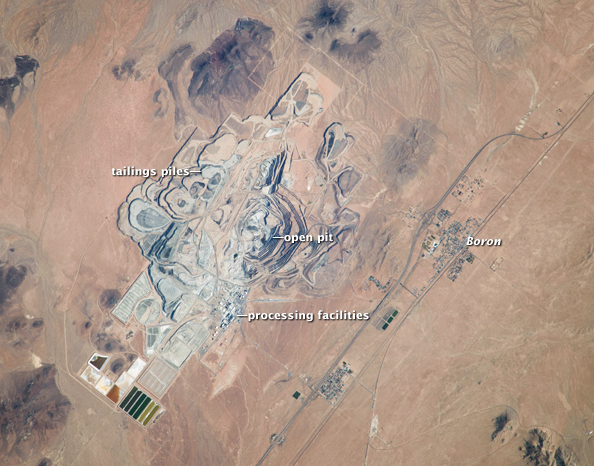
Boron (right center) and the Rio Tinto Borax mine from ISS, 2013

A large borax deposit was discovered in 1925, and the mining town of Boron was established soon thereafter. This borax deposit is the world's largest borax mine. It is owned by Rio Tinto Minerals (formerly U.S. Borax). It is operated as an open-pit mine, the largest open-pit mine in California. This mine supplies nearly half of the world's supply of refined borates. Rio Tinto Minerals is Boron's primary employer, employing over 800 people.

Workers at Rio Tinto are represented by Local 30 Mine, Mineral and Processing Workers of the International Longshore and Warehouse Union. Originally represented by Local 85 of the International Chemical Workers' Union, workers voted to affiliate with the ILWU in 1966. During a 2010 labor dispute, workers were locked out by Rio Tinto for 107 days until support from the community and organized labor across California and elsewhere allowed both parties to successfully negotiate a new collective bargaining agreement. The dispute was covered in a 2010 documentary entitled Locked Out.

Six miles (9.7 km) east of Boron, across the county line in San Bernardino County, is what was, until 2014, the world's largest solar power production facility. The Kramer Junction Company (KJC) is the managing general partner of the five 30 megawatt Solar Energy Generating Systems (SEGS) facilities in the Mojave Desert at Kramer Junction, California. Together with its wholly owned subsidiary, KJC Operating Company, KJC operates and manages these facilities (SEGS III-VII).

== Attractions ==
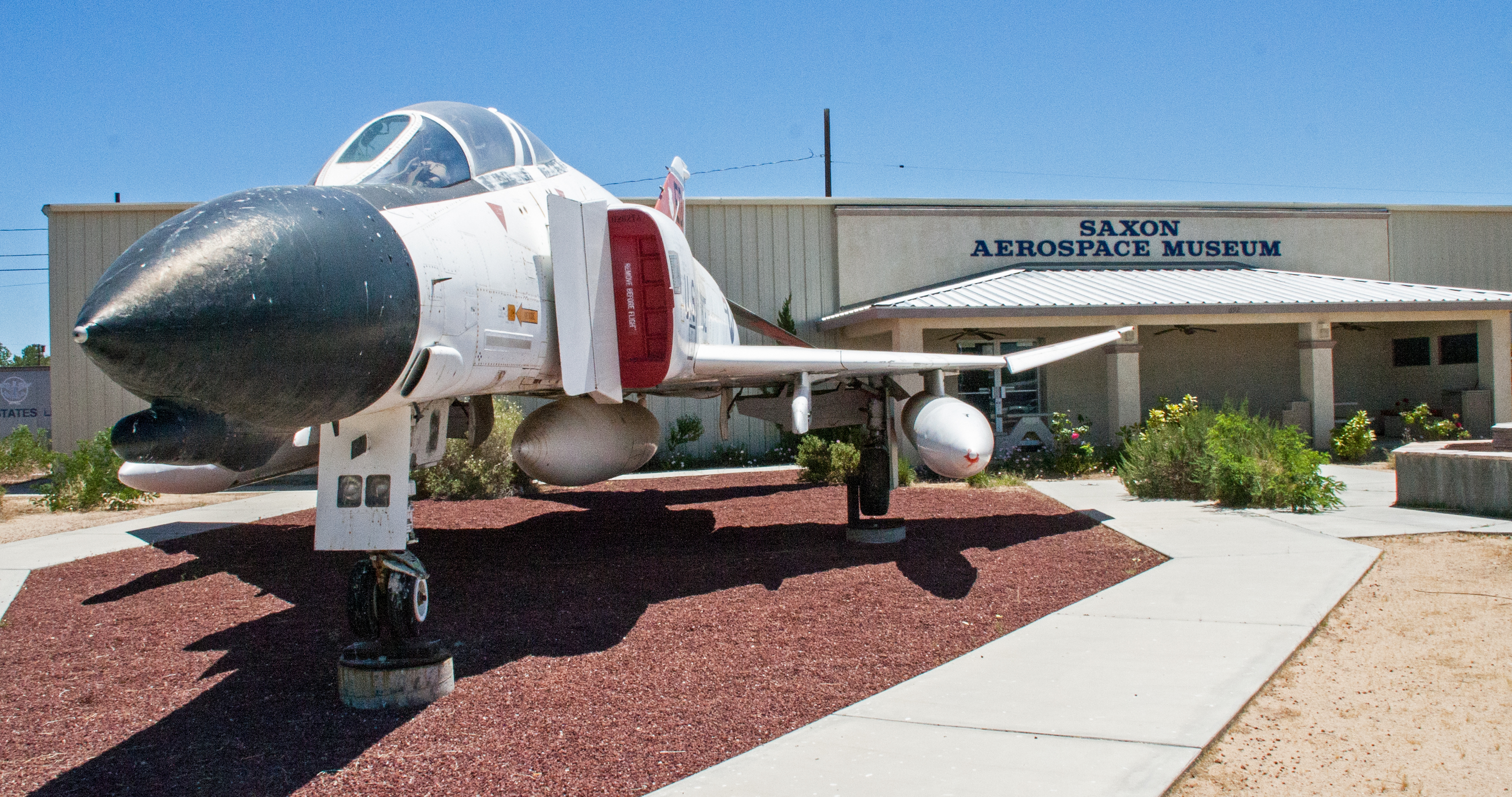
Saxon Aerospace Museum

- Saxon Aerospace Museum, honors aviation history related to nearby Edwards Air Force Base and its Air Force Test Center, the Air Force Research Laboratory and NASA Dryden
- Borax Visitor Center at Rio Tinto Borax Mine, provides information about borax, how it is mined, and how it is used
- Twenty Mule Team Museum, adjacent to the Saxon Aerospace Museum, explains the Twenty-mule teams that originally hauled borax
- Boron Chamber Weather Station, a satirical weather forecast and cultural landmark of the town

== Public services ==
=== Law enforcement ===
Law enforcement services are provided by the Kern County Sheriff's Department. From 1933 to 1954, personnel from the Mojave substation met the law enforcement need of the Boron area. The first actual office space occupied by the sheriff's office in Boron was a quonset hut shared with the fire department in the 12200 block of Boron Avenue. This continued until 1963 when the sheriff's office established the substation building at 26949 Cote Street. This building housed a small jail and the court in Boron, which operated one day a week.

A federal prison was closed in 2000.

=== Fire services ===
In 1969 the new Boron station 17 opened at 26965 Cote Street. This fire station is operated by the Kern County Fire Department.

=== Schools ===
Boron schools are part of the Muroc Joint Unified School District. The local Boron schools include the K – 6 grade West Boron Elementary School, and the 7 – 12th grade Boron High School. Boron High School's mascot is the Bobcat. Boron's first school, Gephart School was built in 1929. It burned to the ground in 1994.

== Churches ==
Boron's original church building was completed for the First Baptist Church in 1940. Boron currently has eight churches. They are the Assembly of God Church, the Boron Bible Church, the Church of Christ, the Church of Jesus Christ of Latter-day Saints, the First Baptist Church of Boron, the Jesus Name Tabernacle United Pentecostal Church, St. Joseph's Catholic Church and Christians in Faith Church.

== Notable residents ==
- Boron was the home of "Walking George" Swain, whose penchant for walking made him a legend. George earned his name as "Walking George" because he never owned a car, or house, and walked to and from work—from his home, which was always rumored to be just a hole in the desert. He supposedly kept himself warm at night with a covering of newspapers. His wardrobe was always the same: wrinkled shirt and pants with well-worn boots. Swain was a chemist at the borax plant in Boron. He attended local events and often played the piano for entertainment. He taught piano to children in Boron and played at the Baptist Church. On his 59th birthday in 1978 an article about George appeared in the Los Angeles Times. By May 1979 he was featured on the TV show Real People. He died on April 25, 2000.
- Boron was home to Pancho Barnes from 1966 to 1975. Barnes was a world-renowned air race and stunt pilot during the 1920s and 1930s. She is better known, however, for being the matron of the Happy Bottom Riding Club. She was forced to move when, during a heated dispute with Edwards Air Force Base over the expansion of one of the nearby base's runways, the club mysteriously burned down. Years later Barnes moved to Boron from Gypsy Springs when her age no longer allowed her to properly tend to her ranch. She died in Boron during the spring of 1975.

== Media ==
The movie Erin Brockovich (2000), starring Julia Roberts, and various other movies have been filmed in the town, often using local residents as extras.

- Movies/shows using locations in and around Boron
  - Locked Out (2010)
  - Erin Brockovich (2000)
  - Gentleman Don La Mancha (2004)
  - Gridiron Gang (1993) (TV)
  - Neon Signs (1996)
  - Spotlight on Location: Erin Brockovich (2000) (TV)
  - ...aka Making of 'Erin Brockovich', The (2000) (TV)
  - Death Valley Days (1952–1975)
  - The Carpetbaggers (1964)
