= Svein =

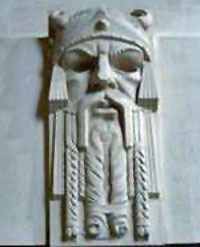

Svein is a Norwegian masculine given name. Notable people with the given name include:

== Rulers ==
- Sweyn Haakonsson (died c. 1016), in Norwegian Svein Håkonsson, an earl and co-ruler of Norway from 1000 to c. 1015
- Svein Knutsson (c. 1016–1035), King of Norway as Sweyn II

== Politicians, civil servants and businessmen ==
- Svein Aaser (born 1946), Norwegian business executive
- Svein Alsaker (born 1940), Norwegian politician
- Svein Olav Agnalt (born 1949), Norwegian politician
- Svein Fjellheim (born 1945), Norwegian trade unionist and politician
- Svein Flåtten (born 1944), Norwegian politician
- Svein Gjedrem (born 1950), Norwegian economist and former Governor of the Central Bank of Norway
- Svein Gjelseth (born 1950), Norwegian politician
- Svein Roald Hansen (born 1949), Norwegian politician
- Svein Harberg (born 1958), Norwegian businessman and politician
- Svein Kristensen (born 1946), Norwegian civil servant, former Director of the Norwegian Tax Administration
- Svein Longva (1943–2009), Norwegian economist and civil servant
- Svein Ludvigsen (born 1946), Norwegian politician
- Svein Lundevall (born 1944), Norwegian civil servant
- Svein Munkejord (born 1948), Norwegian politician
- Svein Olsen Øraker (1886–1963), Norwegian politician
- Svein Harald Øygard (born 1960), Norwegian economist and head of the Central Bank of Iceland in 2009
- Svein Rennemo (born 1947), Norwegian businessman and chair of Statoil
- Svein Ole Sæther (born 1948), Norwegian diplomat
- Svein Sundsbø (born 1943), Norwegian businessman and politician

== Academics ==
- Svein Bjerke (born 1938), Norwegian religious historian and professor emeritus at the University of Oslo
- Svein Hatløy (1940–2015), Norwegian architect and professor
- Svein B. Manum (1926–2015), Norwegian botanist and professor
- Svein Mønnesland (born 1943), Norwegian Slavist and professor

== Athletes ==
- Svein Engen (born 1953), Norwegian former biathlete
- Svein Fjælberg (born 1959), Norwegian former footballer
- Svein Grøndalen (born 1955), Norwegian retired footballer
- Svein Haagensen (born 1939), Norwegian former ice hockey player
- Svein Hansen (1943–2012), Norwegian ice hockey player
- Svein Gaute Hølestøl (born 1971), Norwegian former cyclist
- Svein Jacobsen, Norwegian orienteering competitor in the 1970s
- Svein Morten Johansen (born 1971), Norwegian retired footballer
- Svein Kvia (1947–2005), Norwegian footballer
- Svein Langholm, Norwegian former cyclist who won the Norwegian National Road Race Championship in 1975
- Svein Lilleberg (born 1958), Norwegian cross-country skier and Paralympic multi-gold medalist
- Svein Mathisen (1952–2011), Norwegian footballer
- Svein Enok Nørstebø (born 1972), Norwegian former ice hockey player
- Svein Ivar Sigernes (born 1949), Norwegian former football player and coach
- Svein Sigfusson (1912–1992), Canadian athlete and entrepreneur
- Svein Thøgersen (born 1946), Norwegian rower and 1972 Olympic silver medalist
- Svein Tuft (born 1977), Canadian cyclist
- Svein Inge Valvik (born 1956), Norwegian retired discus thrower

== Artists and entertainers ==
- Svein Berge (born 1976), Norwegian electronic musician, half of the duo Röyksopp
- Svein Olav Blindheim (born 1954), Norwegian jazz bass player, composer and writer
- Svein Erik Brodal (born 1939), Norwegian actor, theatre director, poet, novelist and politician
- Svein Christiansen (1941–2015), Norwegian jazz drummer
- Svein Finnerud (1945–2000), Norwegian jazz pianist, painter and graphic artist
- Svein Dag Hauge (born 1956), Norwegian jazz guitarist and record producer
- Svein Olav Herstad (born 1969), Norwegian jazz pianist
- Svein Sturla Hungnes (born 1946), Norwegian actor, theatre director and instructor
- Svein Jarvoll (1946–2026), Norwegian poet, novelist, short story writer, translator and essayist
- Svein Koningen (born 1946), Norwegian abstract expressionist painter
- Svein Nyhus (born 1962), Norwegian illustrator and writer of children's books
- Svein Øvergaard (1912–1986), Norwegian jazz musician and band leader and boxer
- Svein Scharffenberg (1939–2017), Norwegian actor and stage director
- Svein Tindberg (born 1953), Norwegian actor

== Other ==
- Svein Blindheim (1916–2013), Norwegian military officer and member of the resistance during World War II
- Svein Gjerdåker (born 1963), Norwegian newspaper editor
- Svein Heglund (1918–1998), Norwegian engineer, World War II pilot and major general
- Svein Johannessen (1937–2007), Norwegian chess player
- Svein Døvle Larssen (1928–2015), Norwegian newspaper editor
- Svein Rosseland (1894–1985), Norwegian astrophysicist
- Svein Urdal (born 1941), Norwegian former chief of police and former Director of the Norwegian Police Surveillance Agency

== See also ==
- Sveinn
- Sweyn
- Sven
