= Senator Swan =

Senator Swan may refer to:

- James D. Swan (1903–1977), Wisconsin State Senate
- Karl Swan (1931–2022), Utah State Senate
- Monroe Swan (born 1937), Wisconsin State Senate

== See also ==
- Senator Swain (disambiguation)
- Senator Swann (disambiguation)
