= Sveinn =

Sveinn (Old Norse pronunciation: [ˈswɛinː]; Icelandic pronunciation: [ˈsveitn̥]) is a given name. Notable people with the given name include:

- Sveinn Arnason (died 1683), Icelandic man executed for witchcraft
- Sveinn Björnsson (1881–1952), Regent/President of Iceland from 1941 to 1952
- Sveinn Brynjólfsson (born 1975), Icelandic alpine skier
- Sveinn Einarsson (born 1934), Icelandic theatre director
- Sveinn Eythorsson (born 1964), Icelandic guitarist
- Sveinn Aron Guðjohnsen (born 1998), Icelandic footballer
- Sveinn Ólafur Gunnarsson (born 1976), Icelandic film and theater actor
- Sveinn Hákonarson, Earl of the house of Hlaðir and co-ruler of Norway
- Sveinn Ingvarsson (1914–2009), Icelandic sprinter
- Sveinn Jóhannsson (born 1999), Icelandic handball player
- Sveinn Kjarval (1919–1981), Icelandic interior designer
- Sveinn Pálsson (1762–1840), Icelandic naturalist
- Sveinn Rúnar Sigurðsson (born 1976), Icelandic songwriter and music producer
- Sveinn Teitsson (1931–2017), Icelandic footballer
- Sveinn Thorvaldson (1872–1949), Canadian politician

== See also ==
- Svein
- Sven
- Sweyn
