= Joseph Swain =

Joseph Swain may refer to:

- Joseph Swain (academic) (1857–1927), American president of Indiana University
- Joseph Swain (engraver) (1820–1909), English wood-engraver associated with Punch magazine
- Joseph Swain (footballer) (fl. 1903), English footballer
- Joseph Swain (poet) (1761–1796), British Baptist minister and hymnwriter

== See also ==
- Joseph Swan (disambiguation)
