= Rio Tinto Borax Mine =

Borax mine in California, USA

Coordinates: 35°2′34.447″N 117°40′45.412″W

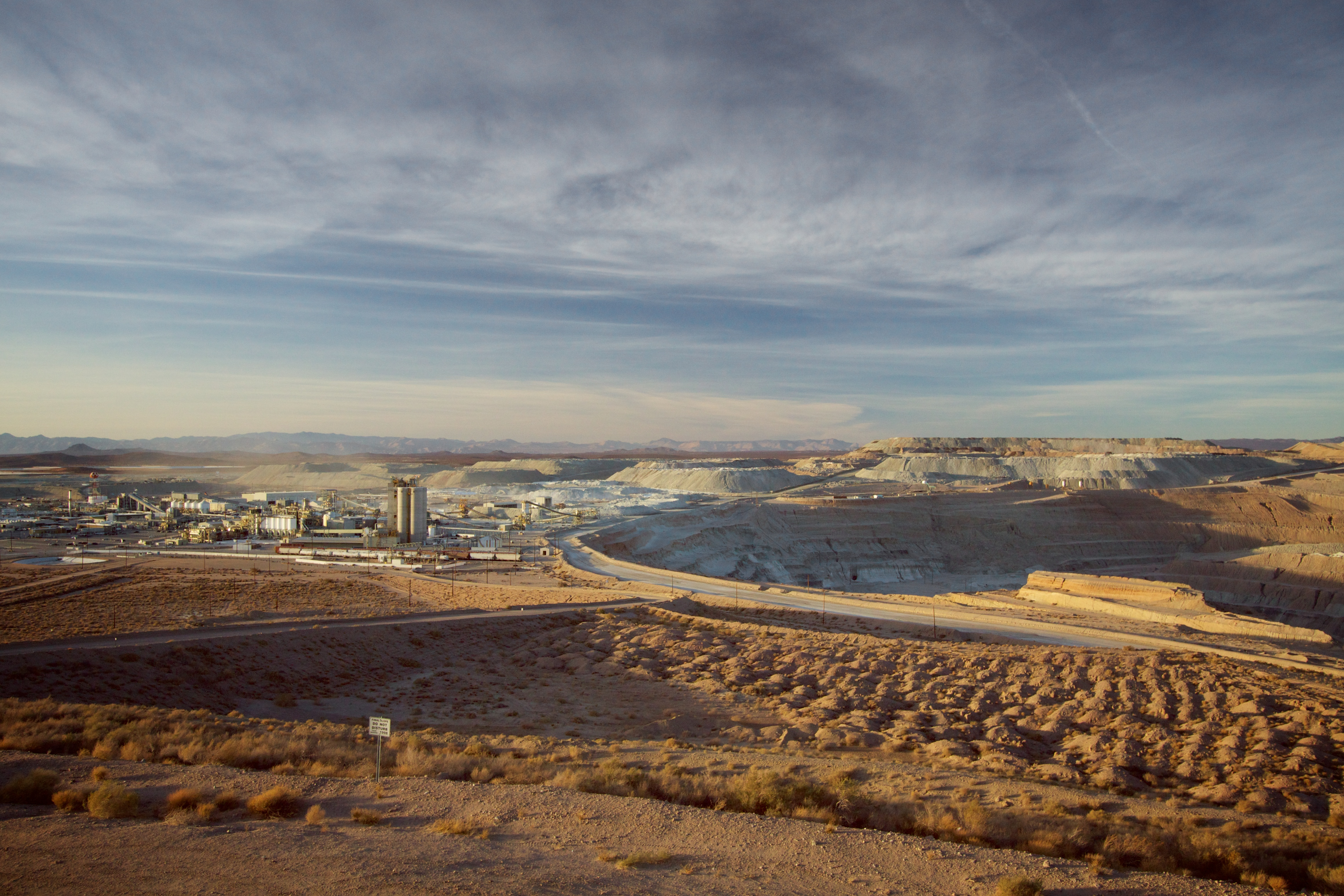
Rio Tinto Borax mine and plant, 2012

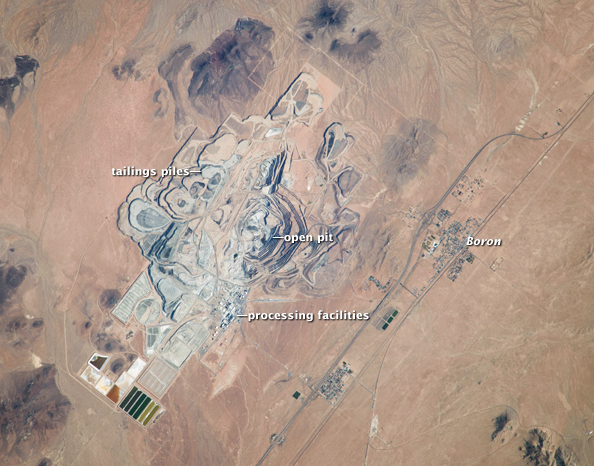
Rio Tinto Borax mine from ISS, 2013

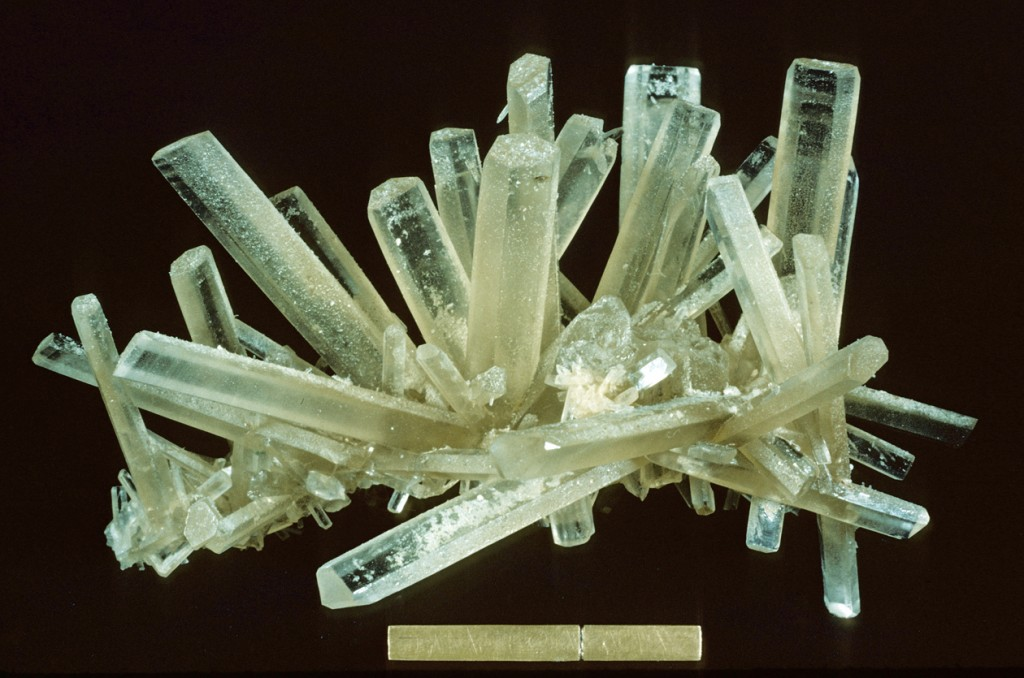
Borax crystals, Boron Mine. Scale is one inch, ruled at one cm.

The Rio Tinto Boron Mine (formerly the U.S. Borax Boron Mine) in Boron, California is California's largest open-pit mine and the largest borax mine in the world, producing nearly half the world's borates. Ore reserves are sufficient for current economic production through the early 2040s. It is operated by the Borax division of the Rio Tinto Group.

== History ==
The borax deposit here was discovered in 1913, by John K. Suckow, who when drilling for water found a deposit of what he believed to be gypsum. Further testing revealed it was the colemanite form of borax. Francis Marion "Borax" Smith bought the claim for his Pacific Coast Borax Company. Mining at the site by shafts began in the 1920s. Pacific Coast Borax later became U.S. Borax, which subsequently opened the current open-pit mine in 1957. U.S. Borax was later acquired by Rio Tinto Group, which continues to operate the mine.

A pilot project to produce lithium by sifting through mining waste began in 2019.

== Borax Visitor Center ==
The mine's Borax Visitor Center, which includes a museum, historic mining artifacts, and a mine overlook, is open to the public.
