= George Swain =

George Swain may refer to:

- George W. Swain (1824–?), senator in the Wisconsin State Senate
- George Gilbert Swain (1829–1918), American businessman and politician
- George Fillmore Swain (1857–1931), American civil engineer
- George Swain (priest) (1870–1955), Dean of Limerick
- George Swain (walker) (1919–2000), local legend from Boron, California
