= First Baptist Church (Boron, California) =

Church in Boron, California, United States

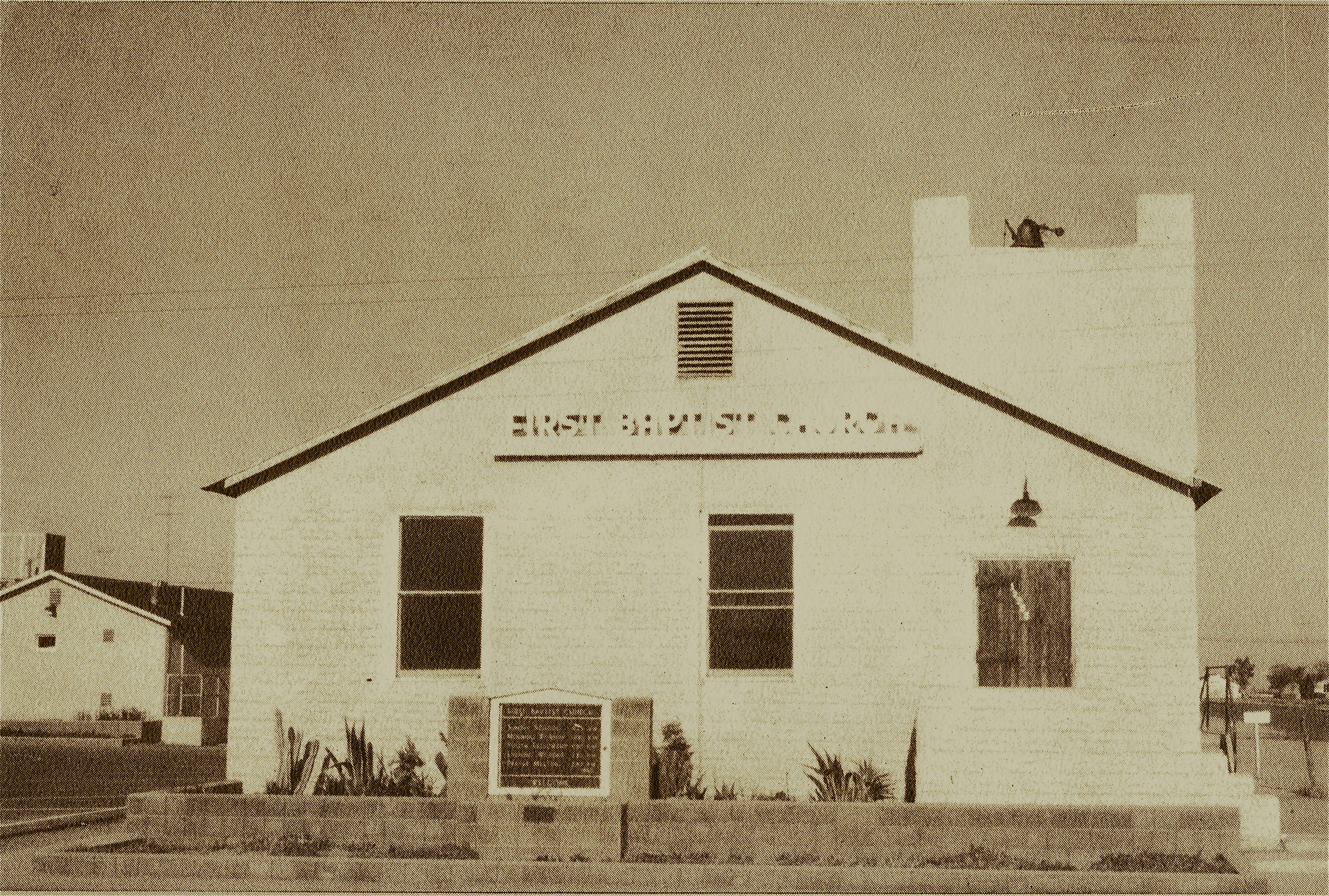
Boron First Baptist Church, c1965

The First Baptist Church of Boron was founded 88 years ago in 1938, as the First Baptist Church of Amargo (the name of the settlement at that time), the first organized church in the community now known as Boron, California, then renamed the Community Baptist Church of Boron, then the First Baptist Church of Boron in 1955. Many pastors have served this church since its foundation.

== Foundations ==
The church in Boron, California began as a Sunday School ministry in the original "company town" north of the present town limits next to the original underground Borax mine. One road of housing was nicknamed "Baptist Road" because several of the families who lived there were Baptist.

75 to 100 people attended the first meeting as a church on Easter Sunday morning in 1938 which was held outside on a platform that would soon become the original parsonage at 12315 Roberts Ave., next door to the parsonage later owned and used by the church. Members continued to meet in the parsonage until the church building was completed one block away at 12255 Boron Avenue in 1940. It was organized as the First Baptist Church of Amargo, California, which was the original name of the settlement a few miles south of the underground mine, on August 21, 1938 with 13 charter members, among them, Mr. and Mrs. Stan Sausser, Mr. and Mrs. C.E. Jamieson, and Mrs. Alpha Cheesman. Three of these original members were Dixie Hill, Leone Jamison, and Stan Sausser who attended the 50 year anniversary of the church which was held on September 18, 1988. The present sanctuary was built by friends and members of the church and dedicated on June 9, 1940.Under the leadership of Rev. Clell Horton the first Sunday School unit was built and dedicated on April 20, 1952. The current parsonage at 12323 Roberts Ave. was built under the leadership of Rev. J. Earl Reavis and dedicated on May 14, 1955 and the Sunday School Annex, which was constructed from two surplus Air Force barracks from Edwards Air Force Base, was dedicated on May 24, 1959.

== Pastors ==
A. Byron Chase was the first pastor of the church, and served until 1942 when he left to become a chaplain in the U.S. Army. Both the Parsonage and the Sanctuary were built by the men of the church. The men made the cement blocks which formed the church by pouring cement into hand-made forms. A basement provided space for classes as well as social activities at the time.

When the community's name was changed to Boron the church was renamed to Community Baptist Church of Boron. In the early years, as the only church in Boron, there were people from varied religious backgrounds attending and worshiping together. As the church and the town grew groups left to establish other churches that followed the pattern, ecclesiastical polity, and worship style each group favored.

Rev. George Kevorkian served as pastor from May 1942 to December 1943 when he and his wife left to become missionaries to the Belgian Congo. In 1948 Rev. Kevorkian was killed in a plane crash there; Mrs. Kevorkian continued to serve in Africa until she retired. Many missionaries served the Boron church before going to the mission field.

Rev. Clell Horton first served as pulpit supply in Boron in 1944 and was officially named pastor in 1945. He and his family served the Boron church for nine years until 1954. The members of the church built the first Sunday School building (now called the Nursery Building) which housed multiple classrooms, and the church grew to average an attendance of 150 to 175 during these years.

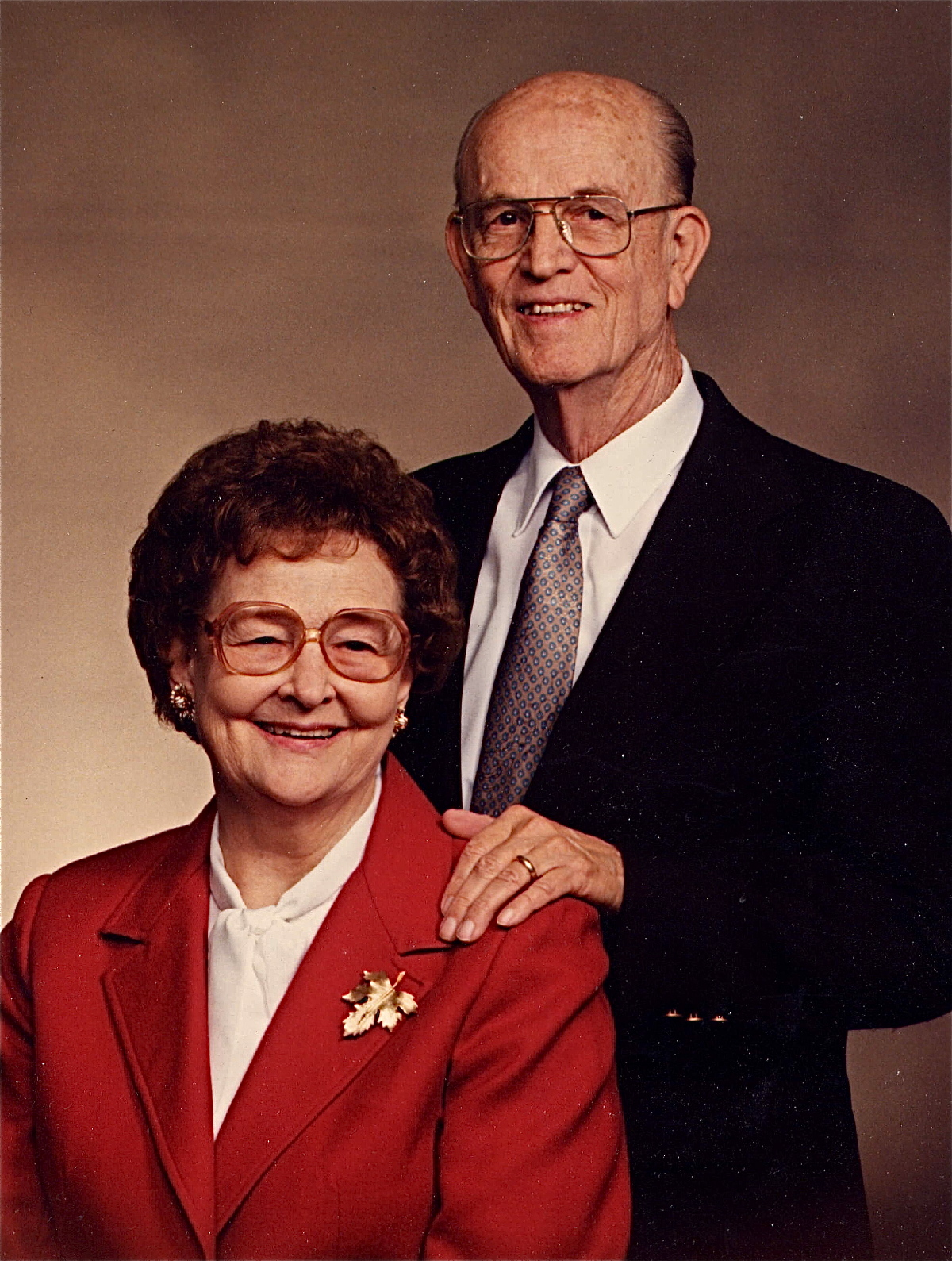
Norvall and Jean Pickett, 1990.

Pastor J. Earl Reavis and his wife MaryJo moved to serve the Boron church in March 1954 and during that 6 year ministry they oversaw the building of a new parsonage and the erection of the current Social Hall and Sunday School class building using two barracks buildings bought from Edwards Air Force Base. Harlee Sallee and Pastor Reavis barely escaped when the building settled and shifted before final placement.

In 1955 the church name was officially changed to the First Baptist Church of Boron. The next pastor of the church was Rev. Fred Hobson of Delano who served the church family from June 1960 to October 1962.

Pastor Norvall Pickett's seven year ministry began on January 9, 1963. He oversaw the redecoration of the interior and exterior of the Sanctuary building and the paving of the church parking lot, adding lights to the parking lot for evening activities as well. He led the congregation in the decision to purchase an additional five acres of land adjacent to the current parsonage across the street from the Boron Junior-Senior High School for future expansion of facilities. Vacation Bible School was held for two weeks each summer serving many children from the community, as well as a family summer camp held at Thousand Pines Christian Camp & Conference Center in Crestline, California most summers. His wife Jean Pickett served the community as a registered nurse during this time. Rev. Pickett left the church to pastor the First Baptist Church of Ridgecrest in January 1970. Membership during this time grew to an average of 200 to 250.

Rev. Cal Gregory was pastor of the church for one year from October 1970 to October 1971, while Rev. Renolds VanBuskirk was pastor of the church for three and one half years, from May 1972 through October 1975. Rev. Robert Estus served the church as Interim pastor three separate times between pastors.

Rev. Dick Seymour came to Boron First Baptist Church as its tenth pastor in September 1976 through August 1994. Rev. Al Stilley was the eleventh pastor serving from October 1994 through August 1998, when the church celebrated its 60th anniversary. He left the church in December 1998.

The church's current membership as of 2012 was around 100 and the pastor was Rev. Sherman Burkhead Jr.

== Pastors ==
1	Rev. A. Byron Chase	August 1938 - April 1942	3 yrs. 8 mo.
2	Rev. George A. Kevorkian	May 1942 - December 1943	1 yrs. 7 mo.
3	Rev. V. Clell Horton	March 1945 - February 1954	8 yrs. 11 mo.
4	Rev. J. Earl Reavis	March 1954 - April 1960	6 yrs. 1 mo.
5	Rev. Fred Hobson	June 1960 - October 1962	2 yrs. 4 mo
6	Rev. Norvall J. Pickett	January 1963 - January 1970	7 yrs.
INT	Rev. Lee Payne	January 1970 - September 1970	8 mo.(Interim)
7	Rev. Calvin Gregory	September 1970 - November 1971	1 yr. 2 mo.
8	Rev. Reynolds S. Van Buskirk	May 1972 - October 1975	3 yrs. 5 mo.
INT	Rev. Robert Estus	November 1975 - September 1976	8 mo. (Interim)
9	Rev. Richard Seymour	October 1976 - August 1994	17 yrs. 10 mo.
10	Rev. Al Stilley	October 1994 - December 1998	4 yrs. 2 mo.
11	Rev. John Goetsch Jr.	December 1998 - May 2001	2 yrs 5 mo.
12	Rev. Rick Owen	June 2001 - May 2003	2 yrs.
13	Rev. Josh Irmler	June 2003 - December 2004	1 yr. 7 mo.
14	Rev. Thomas Kinsfather	January 2005 - October 2012	7 yrs. 10 mo.
15	Rev. Sherman Burkhead	October 2012 - Current	

== Church traditions ==
The church has had a railroad bell in its steeple for over 50 years. It has been rung to call worshipers to service each week as well as to commemorate weddings and many other events happening in the community and the nation as well. A memorial service was held for the community on the death of President John F. Kennedy in November, 1963 at which time this bell was tolled.

Labor Day picnics held in the Tehachapi City Park have long been a tradition of the church family, where many families and old-timers came together for an annual picnic and reunion to mark the end of summer.

Easter Sunrise Services have been held over the years. While Rev. Pickett was pastor, he was also chaplain at the Boron Air Force Station (750th Radar Squadron) which later became the Boron Federal Prison Camp/Boron AFS (site). Easter Sunrise services were held there each year while he was chaplain.

The legendary "Walking George" Swain served as pianist/organist for First Baptist Church from 1965 until near his death in 2000. He started playing for the church after an encounter with him as he walked past the parsonage where Rev. Pickett learned of his genius musical talent. He was invited to stop by the church anytime it was open to practice, and he soon became a regular, playing for services as needed. He rarely missed a meeting even though he walked everywhere he went.

On Sunday, August 18, 2013, Boron First Baptist Church celebrated its 75th anniversary by holding a special service.
