= Swen =

Swen is a given name and a surname. Notable people with the name include

== Given name ==
- Swen Gillberg, American visual effects supervisor
- Swen König (born 1985), Swiss footballer
- Swen Nater (born 1950), Dutch basketball player
- Swen Schuller (born 1971), German sport shooter
- Swen Swenson (1930–1993), American dancer and singer
- Swen Vincke (born 1972), Belgian video game designer, founder of Larian Studios

== Surname ==
- Saylee Swen (born 1984), Liberian footballer

== See also ==
- Sven
- Swern
- Sweyn
