= Swern =

Swern is a surname. Notable people with the surname include:

- Daniel Swern (1916–1982), American chemist
- Phil Swern (1948–2024), English radio producer and music collector

== See also ==
- Swern oxidation, an organic chemical reaction
- Swen
