= Joseph Swan (disambiguation) =

Joseph Swan (1828–1914) was a British physicist and chemist.

Joseph Swan may also refer to:

- Joseph Swan (engraver) (1796–1872), engraver and publisher active in Glasgow
- Joseph Swan Academy, a secondary school in England
- Joseph Rockwell Swan (politician) (1802–1884), American politician and judge
- Joseph Rockwell Swan (coach) (1878–1965), American investment banker, football player and coach

== See also ==
- Joseph Swain (disambiguation)
