= Swaim =

Swaim is a surname. Notable people with the surname include:

- Bob Swaim (born 1943), American film director
- Cy Swaim (1874–1945), American baseball player
- David G. Swaim (1834–1897), United States Army general
- Hardress Nathaniel Swaim (1890–1957), American judge
- John Swaim (1949–2013), American politician
- Kurt Swaim, American politician
- Michael Swaim, American actor, writer, and comedian

== See also ==
- Swain (surname)
