= Robert Swain =

Robert Swain may refer to:

- Robert E. Swain (1875–1961), American chemist and professor at Stanford University
- Robert C. Swain (1908–1989), American chemist and businessman, son of Robert E. Swain
- Robert Swain (artist) (born 1940), American painter
- Robert Swain (footballer) (1944–2016), English footballer

== See also ==
- Robert Swain Gifford (1840–1905), landscape painter
- Robert Swain Peabody (1845–1917), architect
