= Henrik Skadelår =

12th-century Danish prince and pretender

- Born: Henrik Svendsen
- Died: 4 June 1134; Fotevik, Scania
- Spouse: Ingrid Ragnvaldsdotter
- Issue (See more): Magnus Henriksson
- House: Estridsen
- Father: Svend Tronkræver

Henrik Svendsen (Latin: Henricus; unknown - 4 June 1134), better known as Henrik Skadelår or Henrik the Lame, was a Danish prince and pretender through his father, Svend Tronkræver, an illegitimate son of King Sweyn II. He died in the Battle of Fotevik before he could press his claim.

== Early life ==
Henrik was born to Svend Tronkræver and an unknown mother. It is not known whether he was born within a legitimate marriage, but the political situation in Denmark did not disregard illegitimate sons in the succession. His father, a known illegitimate son of King Sweyn II, died in 1104, as a consequence of trying to press his claim for the Danish throne following the sudden death of his brother, Erik the Good.

== Marriage ==
Henrik became a candidate for a political marriage under the influence of King Niels' Swedish queen Margaret Fredkulla, who sought to tie kinship between the thrones of Denmark and Sweden. As a Danish prince and royal nephew of King Niels, he married Ingrid Ragnvaldsdotter, a granddaughter of King Inge I of Sweden. According to Saxo Grammaticus, the marriage was miserable and they did not get along. Coerced by a household lover, Ingrid is said to have once eloped dressed in men's clothing during the night. Henrik, embarrassed, managed to intercept her in Aalborg and brought her back home.

== Political activity ==
Aside from his royal marriage, Henrik was close enough to the monarchy to be present at political events and the royal council. One such event was the royal wedding of his cousin, Magnus the Strong, in Ribe. Henrik's foremost rival was Canute Lavard, a royal cousin and politically successful duke of Schleswig, was also present. Henrik soon came into conflict with Canute over his refined taste and luxurious dress but lost face against Canute's elegant retort. Saxo Grammaticus writes that this rivalry was a product of Henrik's envious of Canute's success and that he was not alone to envy Canute. (Note: Henrik also believed that Canute is to blame for Ingrid's attempt at elopement.)

== Plot against Canute Lavard ==
Fueled with anger, Henrik began to plot with other begrudged nobles (Note: Jarl Ubbe of Lolland and his son Håkon, Canute Lavard's brother-in-law, Håkon Jarl, and Magnus the Strong, are named among them by Saxo.). Henrik used his influence on King Niels to sow bad relations between the King and Canute. Together with the conspirators, Henrik aided the murder of Canute under the leadership of Magnus the Strong who slew him in an ambush outside of Ringsted on Zealand on 7 January 1131.

== Battle of Fotevik ==
The death of Canute Lavard resulted in a civil war where former allies of Canute challenged King Niels' authority. Saxo Grammaticus does not mention Henrik after the murder plot, but he continues to support King Niels and Magnus the Strong. The civil war culminated in the Battle of Fotevik in south-western Scania in 4 June 1134 where Eric II of Denmark emerged the victor. Henrik was among the fallen.

== Issue ==
Henrik Skadelår and his wife Ingrid had at least four sons:

1. Magnus Henriksen, died 1161. King of Sweden 1160–1161.
2. Ragvald Henriksen, died 1161.
3. Canute Henriksen, died 12 March 1162.
4. Buris Henriksen (1130 – 1167), Jarl in Jylland, married to Luitgard von Stade, (daughter of Rudolf I von Stade and his wife Richardis). After Luitgard's death in 1152 Buris fell in love with his first cousin (once removed) Kirsten, Valdemar the Great's sister, according to the ballad Prins Buris og Liden Kirsten.

== Legacy ==
His sons continued to remain important nobles in the Scandinavian monarchies. Magnus was crowned King of Sweden and Ragvald joined him. Knud and Buris remained in Denmark and were involved with the descendant of Canute Lavard, Valdemar the Great. When Henrik died, Ingrid left Denmark and married Harald Gille, the future king of Norway. After Harald Gille passed, she had several marriages with the powerful nobles in Norway and became mother to the next generation of bishops and pretenders to the Norwegian throne.
