= Merrill Nelson =

American politician (born 1955)

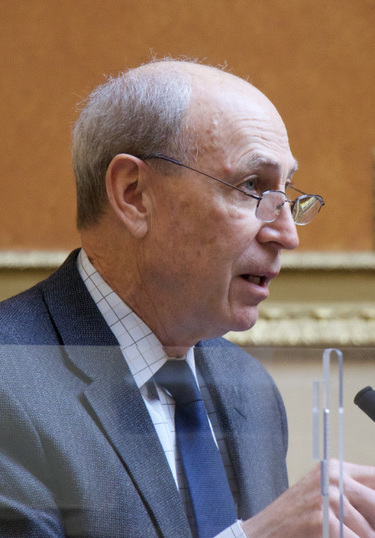

Member of the Utah House of Representatives from the 68th district
- In office January 1, 2013 – December 31, 2022
- Preceded by: Bill Wright
- Succeeded by: Scott Chew

Personal details
- Born: July 16, 1955 (age 71) Tooele, Utah, U.S.
- Party: Republican
- Spouse: Karen Nelson
- Children: 5
- Education: Brigham Young University; J. Reuben Clark Law School
- Profession: Lawyer
- Website: merrillnelson.com

Merrill F. Nelson (born July 16, 1955, in Tooele, Utah) is an American politician and a former Republican member of the Utah House of Representatives representing District 68. Merrill announced he was not seeking re-election in 2022.

== Early life and career ==
Nelson was born in Grantsville, UT. He was the fourth child of eight children of Ruth Nelson (née Francom) and Russell A Nelson. His mother was born in Payson, UT; his father in Tooele, UT. When Merrill was born, his father was a farmer.

Nelson earned his BS in agricultural economics from Brigham Young University and his JD from J. Reuben Clark Law School. He has worked as a Supreme Court Law Clerk from 1982 to 1983 and on the Supreme Court Advisory Committee on Appellate Procedure from 1986 to 1987. Nelson is a member of the Utah State Bar. Nelson chairs the Guardian ad Litem Oversight Committee, and has also worked on the Fair Boundaries Coalition since 2011. He also serves as chair of the Grantsville Old Folks Sociable.

== Political career and elections ==
During the 2022 legislative session, Nelson served on the Infrastructure and General Government Appropriations Subcommittee, House Health and Human Services Committee, and House Transportation Committee.

- In 2020, Nelson won 75.3% of the vote and won election once again to the Utah of House of Representatives.
- In 2018, Nelson defeated Merle Wall, Kirk Pearson, Denyse Housley Cox, and Warren Rogers with 71.4% of the vote in the general election for Utah House of Representatives District 68 on November 6.
- In 2016, Nelson won 70.81% of the vote in the Utah House of Representatives District 68 general election.
- In 2014, Nelson was unopposed for the Republican convention and won the November 4, 2014 general election due to being unopposed because Independent candidate Rett Rowley was disqualified before the election.
- 2012 Nelson was selected from four candidates by the Republican convention to challenge District 68 incumbent Republican Representative Bill Wright in the June 26, 2012 Republican primary, winning with 1,910 votes (52.3%) and won the three-way November 6, 2012 General election with 9,831 votes (73.8%) against Democratic nominee Thomas Nedreberg and Constitution candidate Paul McCollaum Jr.
- 1998 To challenge Senate District 13 incumbent Democratic Representative George Mantes, Nelson won the 1998 Republican primary, but lost the November 3, 1998 General election by 45 votes to Democratic nominee Ron Allen who had won the Democratic Primary against Senator Mantes. Allen served in the seat from 1999 until 2006.

== Notable legislation ==
- 2019- Representative Nelson was the Floor Sponsor of SJR 009, which calls for a Convention of States pursuant to Article Five of the United States Constitution. The Resolution asserts that a Convention of States is necessary to address the growing national debt, "limit the power and jurisdiction of the federal government," and "limit the terms of office" for federal officers. Columnist Bob Bernick described the Resolution as "the most important piece of legislation passed by the 2019 Legislature."
- 2022- Representative Nelson ran HB 143 which increases the penalty for a second driving under the influence conviction to a class a misdemeanor under certain circumstances.
- 2022- Representative Nelson ran HB 344 which, among other things, creates a medical candor process where a health care provider may investigate an injury, or suspected injury, associated with a health care process and may communicate information about the investigation to the patient and any representative of the patient.

== 2022 sponsored legislation ==
Bill number	Bill name	Bill status
HB 87	Procurement Code Revisions	House/ filed - 3/4/22
HB 143	DUI Penalty Amendments	House/ filed - 3/4/22
HB 205	County Officer Fees Amendments	Governor signed - 3/24/22
HB 219	Uniform Unregulated Child Custody Transfer Act	Governor signed - 3/24/22
HB 344	Utah Medical Candor Act	Governor signed - 3/24/22
HJR 13	Joint Resolution Amending Court Rules of Procedure and Evidence to Address the Medical Candor Process	House/ enrolled bill to Printing - 3/14/22
HR 1	House Rules Resolution - Reconsideration of Action	House/ filed - 3/4/22

== Arizona Child Abuse Lawsuit ==
During his professional career, Nelson worked as an attorney for the law firm Kirton McConkie which represents the Church of Jesus Christ of Latter-day Saints based out of Salt Lake City, Utah. In this capacity, one of his duties was receiving phone calls from ecclesiastical leaders through a helpline to give legal advice regarding sensitive situations. Nelson was named in a lawsuit brought against the church, alleging that he gave legal advice to two Bishops not to report a case of sexual abuse of children to law enforcement or child protective services. Section 13-3620 of the Arizona Code allows clergy members (like Bishops) to choose whether reporting abuse disclosed in a confession is in the best interests of the parties involved. The church asserted that, as required by Arizona law, the Bishop sought permission from the perpetrator of the abuse to report his confession to the authorities. When the perpetrator declined to grant permission, the Bishop asked both the perpetrator and his wife to report the abuse themselves, but both again refused. In April 2023, the Arizona Supreme Court ruled that Arizona's clergy-privilege law properly applies to LDS Bishops. In July 2026, the Arizona Supreme Court confirmed that, consistent with Nelson's legal advice, Arizona clergy are exempt from reporting child abuse disclosed in a confession or other confidential communication. The ruling was supported by numerous faith groups, including the Roman Catholic Diocese, the Seventh Day Adventists, the African Methodist Episcopal Church, Baps Swaminarayan Santhsa, a Hindu denomination, and the Church of Scientology International, the American Islamic Congress, and the Jewish Coalition for Religious Freedom.
