= Ingrid Ragnvaldsdotter =

Queen of Norway from 1134 to 1136

Queen consort of Norway
- Tenure: 1134–1136
- Born: 1100/1110
- Died: After 1161
- Spouse: Henrik Skadelår; Harald Gille; Ottar Birting; Arne Ivarsson
- Issue: 10 known children. See list
- House: Stenkil
- Father: Ragnvald Ingesson

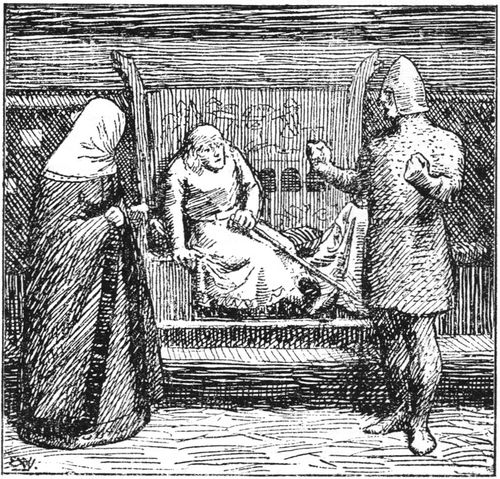
Ingrid, King Inge Haraldsson and Gregorius Dagsson, the king's senior advisor

Ingrid Ragnvaldsdotter (Old Norse: Ingiríðr Rögnvaldsdóttir) (1100/1110 – after 1161 AD) was born a member of the Swedish royal family, became a member of Danish royalty by marriage and later was Queen consort of Norway as the spouse of Harald IV of Norway. Married four times, Ingrid had a number of children who played prominent roles in Norwegian, Danish and Swedish history.

== Biography ==
Ingrid Ragnvaldsdotter was born between 1100 and 1110. History has not recorded either the name nor background of Ingrid's mother. She was the daughter of Ragnvald Ingesson, the only known son of King Inge I of Sweden. Other than him being the son of king Inge, nothing is known about Ragnvald. Historian Mona Ringvej suggests that this was because he died early and never succeeded as king. Other historians have speculated that he could have been the Ragnvald Knaphövde who appear in the regnal lists a little later. Though there is no evidence of a link between this Ragnvald and Inge I in the source materials.

Ingrid first married Henrik Skadelår (Henrik Svendsen Skadelår), son of Svend Svendsen of Denmark, who was one of the bastard sons of King Sweyn II of Denmark. Svend Svendsen was an unsuccessful pursuer to the throne, who died when he was at a point of being elected as king. Henrik was crippled and not considered a candidate for kingship. Instead he was a frequent schemer and plotter, generating a number of enemies. Four sons of Henrik and Ingrid are recorded, including King Magnus II of Sweden. Saxo describes the marriage as tempestuous, and recounts a story where she, disguised as a man, attempts to elope with a lover.

Ingrid is known to have intrigued for her son Magnus to obtain the Swedish throne, in Ingrid's opinion her late father's rightful inheritance. She reportedly suggested that her son Magnus employ the man who would kill Sverker I of Sweden. Henrik Skadelår died on 4 June 1134 at the Battle of Fotevik in the Bay of Fotevik near Vellinge in Skåne.

Ingrid soon after married King Harald Gille of Norway. By him, Ingrid had a son who later became King Inge Haraldsson of Norway. When King Harald was murdered in 1136, Ingrid played a prominent part in having her son, Inge, and her stepson, Sigurd, proclaimed co-rulers, and in waging the ensuing war against the attempted usurper, Sigurd Slembe. She remained one of the most important advisors of King Inge throughout his reign.

Her third husband was Ottar Birting (Óttarr Birtingr), a prominent lendmann, but she was again widowed when he was killed in Nidaros at some point in the 1140s.

Between her third and fourth husband, Ingrid bore a child out of wedlock, Orm Ivarsson, by an otherwise unknown man called Ivar Sneis.

Ingrid's fourth and last husband was Arne Ivarsson of Stårheim, (Árni Ívarsson á Stoðreimi), another prominent lendmann with whom she had four children. Arne Ivarsson was subsequently called Kongsmåg meaning in-law of the king.

As an advisor to her son King Inge, Ingrid played a prominent part in many of the events of the early civil war era in Norway. On 3 February 1161, King Inge was defeated and killed, leading his men into battle against King Haakon the Broadshouldered. In the saga Heimskringla, Ingrid is last mentioned when she and her husband left Norway for exile in Denmark.

=== Notes on name ===
Ingrid's name can be found in a wide variety of spellings in the modern Scandinavian languages and English. Her first name, in Old Norse Ingiríðr, is rendered as Ingrid or Ingerid. Her patronym, in Old Norse Rögnvaldsdóttir, can be rendered as Ragnvaldsdotter, Ragvaldsdotter or Ragnvaldsdatter.

== Issue ==
=== by Henry Sweynson (Henrik Skadelår) ===
- King Magnus II of Sweden (Magnus Henriksson) - who arranged the murder of Saint Eric IX of Sweden, and possibly also Sverker I of Sweden; was himself murdered; and was regarded a usurper afterwards
- Jarl Ragnvald Henriksson (Ragvald Henriksson) - Riksjarl of Sweden during his brother's brief reign.
- Canute Henriksson (Knud Henriksen), Duke of Southern Jutland
- Burits Henriksson (also Buris/Boris; likely 1130–1167, murdered), Duke of Southern Jutland, in 1166 married with a daughter (b. 1150) of Luitgard of Stade and Hermann II, Count of Winzenburg.

=== by Harald Gille (Haraldr Gilli) ===
- King Inge Haraldsson of Norway (Ingi Haraldsson)

=== by Ivar Sneis (Ívarr Sneis) ===
- Orm Ivarsson (Ormr konungsbróðir) (illegitimate) - prominent leader during the reign of king Magnus Erlingsson, and after the death of Erling Skakke, next to the king in power.

=== by Arne Ivarsson of Stårheim (Árni Ívarsson á Stoðreimi) ===
- Inge Arnesson (Ingi Árnason)
- Bishop Nicholas Arnesson (Nikolás Árnason) - co-founder of the Bagler party
- Philip of Herdla (Philippus í Herðlu)
- Margrete Arnesdotter (Margrét Árnadóttir), who became mother of the Bagler king Philip Simonsson

== Sources ==
- Lagerqvist, Lars O Sverige och dess regenter under 1000 år (Stockholm: Albert Bonniers Förlag AB. 1982)

| Preceded by Christine of Denmark | Queen consort of Norway; 1134–1136 | Succeeded by Ragna Nikolasdatter |
