= Sven Czekalla =

German politician (born 1983)

Member of the Landtag of Saxony-Anhalt
- Incumbent
- Assumed office 6 June 2021
- Preceded by: Willi Mittelstädt
- Constituency: Merseburg

Personal details
- Born: 8 January 1983 (age 43)
- Party: Christian Democratic Union (since 2004)

Sven Czekalla (born 8 January 1983) is a German politician serving as a member of the Landtag of Saxony-Anhalt since 2021. He has served as chairman of the Christian Democratic Union in the Saalekreis since 2026. From 2019 to 2024, he served as mayor of Krumpa.
