= Tony Swain =

Tony Swain may refer to:

- Tony Swain (chemist) (1922–1987), chemist known for his definition of a plant polyphenol
- Tony Swain (musician) (born 1952), pop musician and songwriter
