= William Swain =

William Swain may refer to:

- William Moseley Swain (1809–1868), American journalist, publisher and founder
- William Swain (architect) (b.1861), American architect and mayor in Pullman, Washington
- William Swain (diplomat), ambassador from the Marshall Islands to the United Nations
- William Swain (cricketer), English cricketer, businessman and inventor
- Bill Swain, linebacker

== See also ==
- William Swayne, bishop
- William Marshall Swayne, American sculptor and writer
- William Swayne (MP), Member of Parliament for Chippenham (UK Parliament constituency) in 1589
