= Robert E. Swain =

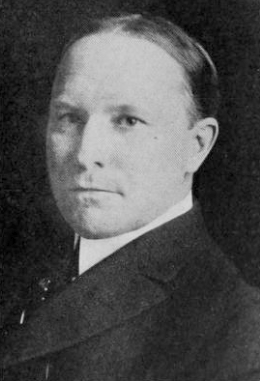
- Born: January 5, 1875; Hollister, California, US
- Died: May 31, 1961 (aged 86); Palo Alto, California, US
- Education: Stanford University; Yale University
- Scientific career
- Workplaces: Stanford University; SRI International

Robert Eckles Swain (January 5, 1875 – May 31, 1961) was an alumnus of and faculty member at Stanford University, a mayor of Palo Alto, California and a founder of SRI International.

== Early life ==
Born on January 5, 1875, in Hollister, California, to Thomas H. Swain, the jolly, generous “Tom’ and Leila Belle [nee: Gilbert] a town that his father and three associates had founded. He had one sister, three brothers; William, March 17, 1874, Margaret, Jan. 16,1877, Thomas Hendricks, July 4,1878, Ira Augusta, Aug. 28,1880, and one half brother; Edward Lemon, born April 8, 1871. After two years of high school, Swain entered Stanford University in its fourth class of undergraduates. His professor Jarius Maxson Stillman, head of Stanford's department of chemistry, convinced him to study chemistry. Swain graduated with his bachelor's degree in 1899.

Swain's first academic job occurred in 1898, prior to his graduation; he was a teaching assistant. In 1899, he was appointed as an instructor at Stanford, but left on a leave of absence to study biochemistry at Yale University under Lafayette Mendel and Russell Henry Chittenden. Swain received a master's degree in 1901. The following year, he worked with Franz Hofmeister at Strassburg and with Albrecht Kossel at Heidelberg, returning to Stanford as an assistant professor in 1902. After another year of leave, Swain completed a Ph.D. at Yale in 1904.

== Career ==
In 1912, Swain attained the rank of full professor. In 1917, he became the head of Stanford's chemistry department, succeeding the professor that convinced him to pursue chemistry; he would hold that position until his retirement in 1940. From 1929 to 1933, Swain was acting president of Stanford University while Ray Lyman Wilbur was United States Secretary of the Interior for Herbert Hoover.

Swain also participated in local politics, serving on the Palo Alto, California city council from 1912 to 1921, including three terms as mayor from 1914 to 1916.

Swain was a strong proponent of the establishment of a research institute at Stanford University, which would eventually become SRI International.

== Legacy ==
Swain and his first wife, Harriet King (Cuthbertson) Swain had two children: Robert Cuthbertson Swain, himself a prominent chemist, and Dorothy Muriel Swain, who married Ralph Norman Begien Jr. Professor Swain's second wife was Juanita Elena (Hiestrich) Jaffe Swain.
