= Brett Swain (cricketer) =

Australian cricketer (born 1974)

Personal information
- Born: 14 February 1974 (age 52); Adelaide, Australia
- Source: Cricinfo, 28 September 2020

Brett Swain (born 14 February 1974) is an Australian cricketer. He played in twenty-three first-class and nineteen List A matches for South Australia between 1994 and 2002.

== See also ==
- List of South Australian representative cricketers
