= Svenja Heesch =

Botanist

- Education: University of Otago
- Occupation: algal taxonomist
- Employer: Rostock University
- Scientific career
- Thesis: Endophytic phaeophyceae from New Zealand (2005)
- Doctoral advisor: Catriona Hurd, Akira Peters

Svenja Heesch is a German botanist, algologist, biogeographer, curator and explorer, and is a specialist in the taxonomy of algae families.

== Academic career ==
In 2005 Heesch completed her Ph.D. at the University of Otago, supervised by Akira Peters and Catriona Hurd. Prior to this she had completed a diploma at the Institute of Marine Science, Kiel University. Heesch undertook postdoctoral research at NIWA before returning to Europe, where she has worked at the Scottish Association for Marine Science, the Ryan Institute of the National University of Ireland, and the Roscoff Biological Station, Brittany. Now based at the University of Rostock, Heesch has received funding to research the taxonomy of Prasiolaceae from the Svalbard archipelago, and to integrate molecular and morphological approaches to clarify relationships within the family.

== Awards and honours ==
In 2018 Wendy Nelson and Judy Sutherland named a species of filamentous algae Prasionema heeschiae. Nelson and Sutherland wrote that "The specific epithet honours Svenja Heesch, our colleague who has made significant contributions to the study of the Prasiolales". It is the first recorded species of the genus Prasionema in the southern hemisphere, and was collected from Campbell Island.

== Selected publications ==
- Joseph Ivan Hoffman; Svenja Heesch; Melody Susan Clark (3 July 2023). "Editorial: Polar Genomics in a Changing World". Genes. 14 (7): 1395. doi:10.3390/genes14071395. ISSN 2073-4425. PMC 10379204. PMID 37510300. Wikidata Q123439809.
- J. Mark Cock; Lieven Sterck; Pierre Rouzé; et al. (3 June 2010). "The Ectocarpus genome and the independent evolution of multicellularity in brown algae". Nature. 465 (7298): 617–621. doi:10.1038/nature09016. ISSN 1476-4687. PMID 20520714. Wikidata Q22122187.
- Svenja Heesch; Judy E.S. Broom; Kate F. Neill; Tracy J. Farr; Jennifer L. Dalen; Wendy A. Nelson (May 2009). "Ulva, Umbraulva and Gemina: genetic survey of New Zealand taxa reveals diversity and introduced species". European Journal of Phycology. 44 (2): 143–154. doi:10.1080/09670260802422477. ISSN 0967-0262. Wikidata Q56772777.
- Svenja Heesch; Ga Youn Cho; Akira F. Peters; et al. (28 April 2010). "A sequence-tagged genetic map for the brown alga Ectocarpus siliculosus provides large-scale assembly of the genome sequence". New Phytologist. 188 (1): 42–51. doi:10.1111/j.1469-8137.2010.03273.x. ISSN 0028-646X. PMID 20456050. Wikidata Q39874895.
- Irene Biancarosa; Ikram Belghit; Christian G Bruckner; Nina S Liland; Rune Waagbø; Heidi Amlund; Svenja Heesch; Erik-Jan Lock (18 January 2018). "Chemical characterization of 21 species of marine macroalgae common in Norwegian waters: benefits of and limitations to their potential use in food and feed". Journal of the Science of Food and Agriculture. 98 (5): 2035–2042. doi:10.1002/jsfa.8798. ISSN 0022-5142. PMC 5888138. PMID 29193189. Wikidata Q46250472.
