= Svend Tronkræver =

Danish prince (died 1104)

Svend Tronkræver or Svend Svendsen (died 1104) was a Danish prince, one of the illegitimate sons of king Sweyn II of Denmark. He shared the same name with his brother Sweyn the Crusader and another brother.

When his brother Eric Evergood died in July 1103 during a pilgrimage, Svend tried to become the next King of Denmark. On the way to the royal elections at Viborg, he became ill. Not wanting any rivals to get there ahead of him, he continued the journey anyway, but died of hardships. Instead, his younger brother Niels, the last surviving son of King Sweyn II, was elected king the following year.

He was the father of Henrik Skadelår and grandfather of Magnus Henriksen, who ruled briefly as King of Sweden between 1160 and 1161.
