= George Swain (walker) =

George Swain

George Wood Swain (1919–2000) was a local legend from Boron, California. His nickname was "Walking George."

He had penchant for walking that made him a legend among locals, in the Los Angeles Times, and even on national television. George earned his name as "Walking George" because he never owned a car, or home, and walked to and from work — from his home, which was always rumored to be just a hole in the desert. He supposedly kept himself warm at night with a covering of newspapers. His wardrobe was always the same, wrinkled shirt and pants, well-worn boots. He died on April 25, 2000.

== Biography ==
George Swain's life began on October 22, 1919, in Los Angeles, California and spent his early years in Santa Monica and Glendale. His father was a retired Marine Corps captain, and his mother, who was a lover of music, taught George organ and piano. They later moved to Northern California. The family lived first in Santa Cruz and later in San Jose. As a child he attended schools in the San Jose area. George joined the Army in 1940, serving in World War II in the 87th Infantry. After the war, he took a three-month course in chemical analysis at Stanford University and then was hired by U.S. Borax.

== Boron ==
George used to say that he arrived in Boron, California, to work at U.S. Borax, by train at 4 a.m. on the fourth day of the fourth month in 1944 (4/4/44). He worked his entire life at the Borax plant, never marrying. He planned on retiring on August 8, 1988 (8/8/88), but instead retired in 1986. Before retiring he could always quote the exact number of days he had been on the job and the number of days planned until retirement. George retired from U.S. Borax as #3 Mule (meaning third in seniority) a position he held for the three years prior to his retirement.

During his years in Boron George never seemed to have a home. It was rumored that he lived in the desert, sleeping outside or in a ramshackle hut of boxes, but according to the Los Angeles Daily News he lived in free workers' cabins until 1961. He continued to quietly stay in the abandoned Borax cabins, or in colder weather at the Boron Motel until 1993, which was seven years after his retirement. After 1993 he stayed at the motel or house-sat for friends. He regularly ate at the Borax mine cafeteria or the local cafes, often eating two entire meals at a sitting. He showered at the mine. George was usually clean-shaven, but often had long hairs around his neck.

== Personality and interests ==
George was outspoken in his beliefs, eloquently stating his positions. He had diverse and occasionally seemingly contradictory interests once calling Franklin D. Roosevelt the "savior of the nation", yet also called Oliver North a personal hero.

George had three passions: John Muir, conservation, and classical music, especially operas and Richard Wagner. One year he personally financed the Seattle Opera Company which was almost forced to close for the season. He had on one occasion toured the operas of Europe. George was also very generous to whomever he was with and often helped the helpless and hopeless. He hated wastefulness in all its forms. He was often seen picking up trash and recyclable materials, and was a supporter of many environmental causes.

At first he was considered an eccentric, but after he started playing music for local churches he became more accepted in the community. He was considered a genius in such diverse areas as math, chemistry, and music. In his home town he was recognized as their home town hero after appearing on the TV show Real People. He became a part of congregation of the First Baptist Church of Boron after meeting Rev. Norvall Pickett one evening outside his parsonage while Norvall and his son were looking at the stars through a telescope. After learning of his talent Pickett invited him to stop by the church and practice whenever it was open. George continued to be a pianist and organist for the church until his death. He also played at the St. Joseph's Catholic Church. He called himself a "church-going atheist."

He seemed to have photographic memory. He attended local events and often would play the piano for entertainment whenever he could "borrow" one. He played for Boron High School presentations of Gilbert and Sullivan's HMS Pinafore and Trial by Jury, and was a favorite with the cast. He could attend a concert or opera in Los Angeles, San Francisco, or Seattle, always traveling by bus or train, then return to Boron and repeat the concert on the piano by memory. He used his musical talent to teach children in the community.

In 1989, George met Pat and Ben Mosley who asked him to volunteer at the LeConte Memorial Lodge for the Sierra Club in Yosemite National Park, where Pat was curator for eight years. Pat reintroduced George to Carl Sharsmith, with whom 50 years previously George had taken his first saunter. Together they played opera selections at the Tuolumne Meadows Lodge and the Tioga Pass Resort. George was a member of the John Muir Memorial Association where for 25 years he never missed an annual dinner. George was given a lifetime membership to the John Muir Memorial Association only a week before his death.

He was always a one-man entry in the local "Twenty Mule Team Days", greeting fellow residents while walking the parade route. He loved train travel, often reminiscing of taking passage on famous train routes worldwide. George knew the night sky like the back of his hand, able to name every constellation, the names of the stars in each, and their movements.

== Walking ==
His penchant for walking is what made him a legend. On his 59th birthday in 1978 an article about George came out in the Los Angeles Times. By May 1979 he was featured on the TV show Real People and returned in the following November for a reunion.

He walked almost everywhere, unless he was heading to "the city", which then entailed a 30-mile walk to Mojave to catch the bus. He would walk into town for church services where he added his musical talents, or to local town meetings. He would walk to the (now former) Boron Federal Prison, located at the old 750th Radar Squadron site 5 miles out of town (12 miles by road) to visit with the Prison Administrator for an afternoon chat. He would walk to Death Valley for the weekend (at least 100 miles each way). A pair of George's size 14EEE hiking boots now reside in Boron's Twenty Mule Team Museum.

George Swain died at the age of 80. He was found dead on a porch of a house he was house-sitting by a neighbor on April 25, 2000. His death was caused by an irregular heartbeat according to Kern County coroner officials.
