= Svend =

Svend is a Danish and Norwegian male given name. Notable people with the given name include:

- Svend or Sven Aggesen (c.1145–?), Danish historian
- Svend Asmussen (1916–2017), Danish jazz violinist known as "The Fiddling Viking"
- Svend Auken (1943–2009), Danish politician
- Svend Bayer (born 1946), Ugandan-born Danish/English studio potter
- Svend Bergstein (1941–2014), Danish military officer and politician
- Svend Bille (1888–1973), Danish stage and film actor
- Svend Borchmann Hersleb (1784–1836), Norwegian professor of theology and politician
- Svend von Düring (1915–1969), Norwegian actor
- Svend Engedal (1928–2001), Danish-born American soccer goalkeeper
- Svend Foyn (1809–1894), Norwegian sailor
- Svend Frømming (1918–1979), Danish sprint canoer
- Svend Grundtvig (1824–1883), Danish literary historian and ethnographer
- Svend Haugaard (1913–2003), Danish politician
- Svend Erik Hovmand (born 1945), Danish politician and former tax minister)
- Svend Jacobsen (1906–1986), Danish fencer and Olympic competitor
- Svend Jakobsen (1935–2022), Danish politician
- Svend Aage Jensby (born 1940), Danish politician and former defence minister
- Svend Jensen (1905–1979), Danish footballer
- Svend Karlsen (born 1967), Norwegian strongman
- Svend Kornbeck (1869–1933), Danish stage and film actor
- Svend Unmack Larsen (1893–1965), Danish politician
- Svend Lomholt (1888–1949), Danish veterinarian and dermatologist
- Svend Lund (born 1949), Danish handball player and Olympic competitor
- Svend Aage Madsen (born 1939), Danish novelist
- Svend Melsing (1888–1946), Danish actor and theatre director
- Svend Methling (1891–1977), Danish actor and film director
- Svend Munck (1899–1974) Danish fencer and Olympic competitor
- Svend Petersen (1911–1992), Danish-born American author, political researcher and analyst
- Svend Poulsen (c. 1610–c. 1680), Danish military commander
- Svend Pri (1945–1983), Danish badminton player
- Svend Rasmussen Svendsen (1864–1945), Norwegian-born American impressionist artist
- Svend Rathsack (1885–1941), Danish sculptor
- Svend Rindom (1884–1960), Danish screenwriter
- Svend Robinson (born 1952), Canadian politician and gay rights activist
- Svend S. Schultz (1913–1998), Danish composer and conductor
- Svend Adolph Solberg (1831–1890), Norwegian politician
- Svend Wad (1928–2004), Danish boxer and Olympic medalist

== See also ==
- Svend-Erik Kristensen (born 1956), Danish long-distance runner
- Svend-Allan Sørensen (born 1975), Danish conceptual artist and founder of Adressens Forlag
- Sven
