= Joseph Swain (footballer) =

English footballer

Personal information
- Position: Wing half

Senior career*
Years	Team	Apps	(Gls)
1299–9999	Burnley	1	(0)
Total		1	(0)
- * Club domestic league appearances and goals

Joseph Swain was an English professional footballer who played as a wing half. He played one game for Burnley in the Football League Second Division in the 1903–04 season.
