= Sweyn =

Sweyn is a Scandinavian masculine given name. Notable people with the name include:

Kings:

- Sweyn Forkbeard (960–1014), King of Denmark, England, and Norway as Sweyn I
- Sweyn or Svein Knutsson (c. 1016–1035), King of Norway as Sweyn II
- Sweyn II of Denmark (1019–1076), King of Denmark
- Blot-Sweyn or Sweyn the Sacrificer (died 1087), pagan King of Sweden
- Sweyn III of Denmark (1125–1157), King of Denmark

Others:

- Sweyn Haakonsson (died c. 1016), an earl and co-ruler of Norway from 1000 to c. 1015
- Sweyn Godwinson (c. 1020–1052), Earl of Herefordshire, brother of Harold Godwinson, last Anglo-Saxon king of England
- Sweyn the Crusader (c. 1050-1097), Danish participant in the First Crusade, son of Sweyn II of Denmark
- Sweyn Asleifsson (c. 1115–1171), a Viking who appears in the Orkneyinga Saga

== See also ==
- Sven
- Svein
- Sveinn
- Svend
- Swen
