= Sven Dahlvig =

Swedish philatelist

Sven Gunnar Dahlvig is a Swedish philatelist who signed the Roll of Distinguished Philatelists in 2000.
