= Karl Swan =

American politician (1931–2022)

Karl George Swan (March 12, 1931 – March 4, 2022) was an American politician.

Swan was born in Tooele, Utah, and graduated from Tooele High School. He served in the Utah National Guard and graduated from University of Utah. Swan was a high school teacher in Tooele and Grantsville, Utah. He served in the Utah Senate from 1971 to 1991 and was a Democrat. Swan died on March 4, 2022, at the age of 90.
