= Senator Swain =

Senator Swain may refer to:

- George W. Swain (1824–1904), Wisconsin State Senate
- Joshua Swain Jr. (1804–1866), New Jersey State Senate

== See also ==
- Senator Swan (disambiguation)
