= Magnus Henriksson =

King of Sweden from 1160 to 1161

King of Sweden
- Reign: 1160–1161
- Predecessor: Saint Erik
- Successor: Karl Sverkersson
- Died: 1161; Örebro, Sweden
- Spouse: Bridget Haraldsdotter
- House: Estridsen; Stenkil
- Father: Henrik Skadelår
- Mother: Ingrid Ragnvaldsdotter

Magnus Henriksson (Danish: Magnus Henriksen; c. 1130 – 1161), also known as Magnus II, was a Danish lord who ruled as King of Sweden between 1160 and 1161. He was descended from King Inge I of Sweden through his mother, and from Sweyn II of Denmark through his father. According to Saxo Grammaticus, he was involved in the assassination of an earlier king, Sverker the Elder, and the Legend of Saint Erik attributes the killing of his predecessor Erik Jedvardsson (Saint Erik) to him. He was recognized as king only in parts of Sweden before being defeated and killed by Karl Sverkersson at a battle in Örebro in 1161.

== Background ==
The mother of Magnus was Ingrid Ragvaldsdotter, a granddaughter of King Inge I of Sweden. His father was the Danish lord Henrik Skatelår, son of an illegitimate son of King Sweyn II of Denmark. After Henrik's death, Ingrid remarried thrice, with Harald Gille of Norway, then Ottar Birting, and finally Arne from Stårheim. Magnus therefore had kinship ties with the royalty of the three Nordic kingdoms. He was married to his stepsister Bridget Haraldsdotter, a daughter of Harald Gille who had previously been married to the powerful jarl in Västergötland, Karl Sunesson. Magnus is first mentioned in 1148 when he witnessed a document issued by King Sweyn III of Denmark.

== Reign ==
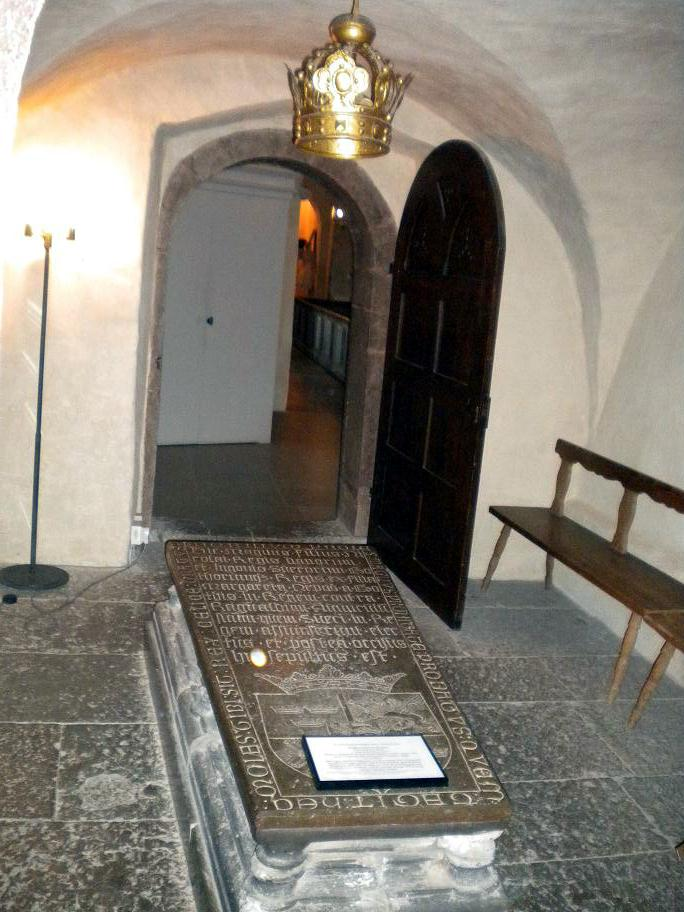
This 16th-century grave monument at Vreta is thought to have been for King Magnus Henriksson (not Magnus Nielsen as the stone shows), though his actual burial probably took place elsewhere within the cloister compound, now in ruins.

Magnus was a claimant to the throne of Sweden, which was much-contested at the time. In 1156, according to Saxo Grammaticus, he bribed a trusted servant of King Sverker the Elder to assassinate him. A few years later, according to a legendary source, he allied with a certain chief in the country, possibly Sverker's son Karl. He then ambushed and killed King Erik Jedvardsson (later to be known as Erik the Saint) when he left the church at Östra Aros near Uppsala on 18 May 1160. After this feat Magnus reigned as king over most of Sweden, but apparently not Östergötland, which was ruled by Karl Sverkersson since c. 1158. He is, however, mentioned in the list of kings of the Västgöta Law, implying that he was recognized in Västergötland. Magnus appointed his brother Ragnvald as jarl and provided refuge to his uterine brother Orm when their brother King Inge the Hunchback was killed in Norway. Otherwise not much is known about his reign, except that he and his brother Ragnvald donated land to Vreta Abbey.

Magnus merely reigned for a year. According to the 15th-century historian Ericus Olai, some followers of Erik the Saint survived the assault in Östra Aros and fled to the north, to Helsingland, where they spread opposition against the usurper king. Dissatisfaction with the regicide among the Swedish peasantry soon led to a rising against Magnus. The near-contemporary Saxo Grammaticus, on the other hand, writes that "he fell in a battle that he fought against Sverker's son Karl, whom he also intended to deprive of his crown, after he had first deprived him of his father." Saxo regarded the violent death of Magnus as the divine revenge for the shameful assassination of Sverker. According to Swedish sources the battle took place in Örebro in 1161.

After the fall of Magnus, Karl Sverkersson reigned as King of Sweden. His full brothers Knut and Buris served as jarls in the court of Valdemar I of Denmark. His uterine brother Nikolas Arnesson was Bishop of Oslo, and an opponent of Sverre of Norway, the son-in-law of Erik the Saint. Queen Bridget later remarried with the powerful jarl Birger Brosa (d. 1202) and became the ancestress of a branch of the House of Bjälbo, and the grandmother of King Johan Sverkersson.

== Literature ==
- Gillingstam, Hans, "Magnus Henriksson", Svenskt biografiskt lexikon, 1982-1984.
- Saxo Grammaticus, Danmarks krønike. København: Asschenfeldt's, 1985 (ISBN 87-414-4524-4).
- Tunberg, Sven, Sveriges historia till våra dagar. Andra delen: Äldre medeltiden. Stockholm: P.A. Norstedt & Söners Förlag, 1926.
- Yngre Västgötalagen, text available at Fornsvenska textbanken

Magnus Henriksson House of Estridsen Died: 1161
Regnal titles
Preceded by Saint Erik	King of Sweden; 1160–1161	Succeeded by Karl Sverkersson
