= Maxine Grimm =

American religious figure

- Born: Maxine Tate; May 18, 1914; Tooele, Utah, U.S.
- Died: February 10, 2017 (aged 102); Tooele, Utah, U.S.
- Known for: The Church of Jesus Christ of Latter-day Saints leader
- Spouse(s): Veldon Shields (m. 1939–1940; his death); Edward Miller "Pete" Grimm (m. 1947–1977; his death)
- Parent(s): Joseph Earl Tate and Bertha Shields Tate

Maxine Shields Grimm (née Tate; May 18, 1914 – February 10, 2017) was a prominent American religious figure. She played a role in re-introducing the Church of Jesus Christ of Latter-day Saints (LDS Church) to the Philippines after World War II. She was instrumental in restoring the Benson Grist Mill as a historical site in Tooele County, Utah. She has served on several advisory boards and committees.

== Biography ==
Maxine Tate was born in Tooele, Utah, the eldest child of Joseph Earl Tate and Bertha (née Shields) Tate. Her father Joseph was employed by the Tooele Valley Railway where he would eventually become the line's superintendent. Her lineage on both sides could be traced to the Mormon pioneers who had walked across the plains to help settle the Utah desert. Two of her grandfathers, John Shields and Samuel Lee, laid out the first boundaries of Tooele City.

She attended public schools in Tooele, graduating as high school valedictorian in 1932. Her mother died that year, so Grimm delayed college plans to remain at home and care for her younger siblings. She later enrolled at the University of Utah, graduating in 1937 with a BA in retailing and business. She then obtained an MA from New York University, after which she returned to Utah as a buyer for ZCMI.

In 1939 she married Veldon Shields, a Tooele-born Utah attorney. However, he died from natural causes on June 7, 1940, in Salt Lake City. She then returned to New York City as secretary to the president of the Retail Association of New York. Her boss was Jewish, and as World War II began engulfing Europe, he worked at smuggling refugees out and finding places for them in New York. Grimm was soon also involved in this activity.

The attack on Pearl Harbor motivated her to become more directly involved in the war effort, so she joined the Red Cross. After training at Fort Bragg, she was shipped overseas. Her first assignment was a New Guinea hospital.

== In the Philippines ==
After New Guinea, Grimm was assigned to assist in setting up a refugee camp in the Philippines. Her main assignment in the Red Cross was to maintain troop morale, providing recreation leadership and vocational counseling. After the US wrested control of the country from the Japanese invaders, she took over a studio of the former Japanese-controlled Radio Manila which had been used to broadcast anti-American propaganda, and used it to do public relations work for the Red Cross. She also took opportunity to mention her LDS heritage, and when an opportunity arose to travel to Utah, she obtained recordings of the Mormon Tabernacle Choir and other publicity materials to broadcast on her radio shows.

During the war she had met US Army Colonel Edward Miller "Pete" Grimm, who had lived in the Philippines prior to the war. They were married in Erda, Utah in 1947, and they lived in Japan, Singapore and Hong Kong as well as in the Philippines. She returned to Tooele each time to bear her two children, Linda and Edward Miller Grimm II ("Pete"), then returned to the Philippines to her husband. Her husband died on November 27, 1977, in the Makati Medical Center, while they were living in the Philippines.

Grimm and her husband contacted leaders of the LDS Church after the war, requesting them to send missionaries to the area. They helped set up branches of the church to aid members of the church who were stationed in the Philippines with the US military. Most of the first LDS baptisms in the area were performed in the Grimms' swimming pool. In recognition of her efforts, future church president Gordon B. Hinckley lauded her work in the Philippines when speaking to the BYU student body in March 1977, a few months before her husband died.

== After the Philippines ==
After her husband died, Grimm and her children split their time between the Philippines and Tooele. She returned to Tooele full-time in 1988, and devoted her time to community affairs. She served as a member of the BYU Roundtable, chaired and helped found the Tooele County Museum, sat on the Salt Lake Opera board, and was asked to chair the Utah State Centennial Commission (1995–96). Every LDS Church president since David O. McKay has visited the Grimms, either in the Philippines or in Tooele.

Even before returning to Tooele full-time, Grimm became involved in the effort to save the Benson Grist Mill. With committee chairman Jack Smith, they were able to have ownership of the property transferred to the County and have county funds applied to its restoration. She helped to write a script for the Benson Gristmill Pageant, which tells how the Tooele Valley was settled. Grimm died on February 10, 2017, at the age of 102.

== Honors ==
Grimm chaired the County's Safe at Home committee in 2005. In 2007 she was named Citizen of the Year by the Tooele City Police Department.

== Links ==
- Photo session in Grimm's home (2013)
