= Cando Tooele Railroad =

American railroad

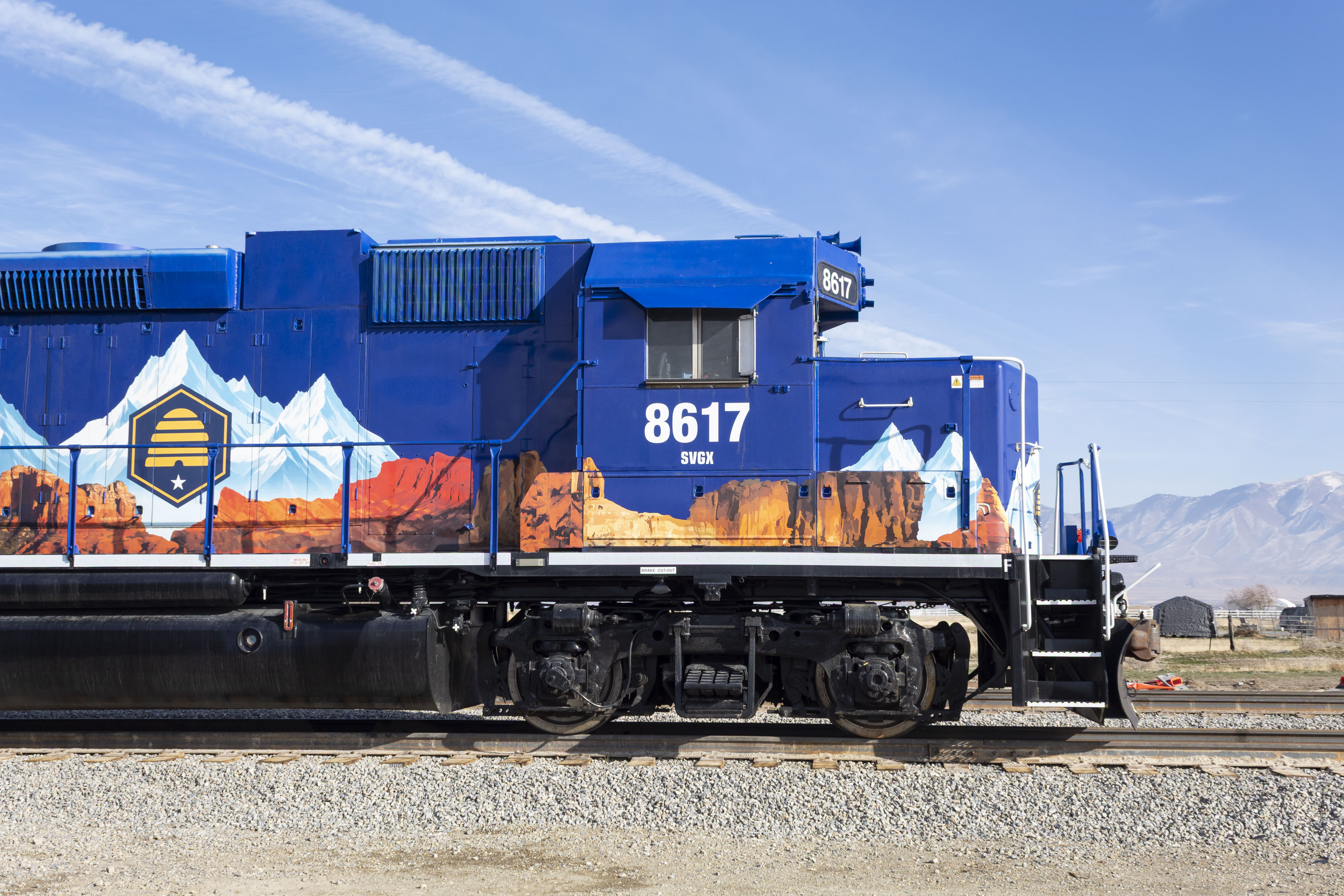

Overview
- Status: Operational - Under Construction

History
- Opened: 17 September 2025

Technical
- Line length: 11 mi (18 km)
- Track gauge: 4 ft 8 1/2 in (1,435 mm)

The Cando Tooele Railroad is a shortline railroad along the former Western Pacific Railroad Warner Branch, to the Lakeview Business Park in Grantsville, Utah. The railroad when complete will be approximately 11 miles long. Authorization from the Surface Transportation Board to build the railroad was given in April 2024. The railroad began construction during the fourth quarter of 2024, and began operating along a completed segment of track in September 2025.

== History ==
The Western Pacific Railroad originally built the Tooele Branch (renamed the Warner Branch in 1962) in 1917 to connect the Western Pacific to the Tooele Valley Railway, accessing the traffic from the International Smelting and Refining Company plant in Tooele, Utah. The Western Pacific branch connected to the Tooele Valley Railway via an elevated overpass built above the Los Angeles and Salt Lake Railroad mainline in Tooele. An interchange with the Tooele Army Depot was built in 1943 providing further traffic along the branch. The final interchange train with the Tooele Valley Railway occurred in 1979. Following the merger between the Western Pacific Railroad and the Union Pacific Railroad the branch would be demoted to a side track in 1983 and struck from the Union Pacific timetable by 1985. Rails were removed from Tooele to the unincorporated community of Marshall, Utah in 2003. A significant portion of the right of way on the Tooele to Grantsville portion of the Warner Branch exists presently as the Mid-Valley Trail.

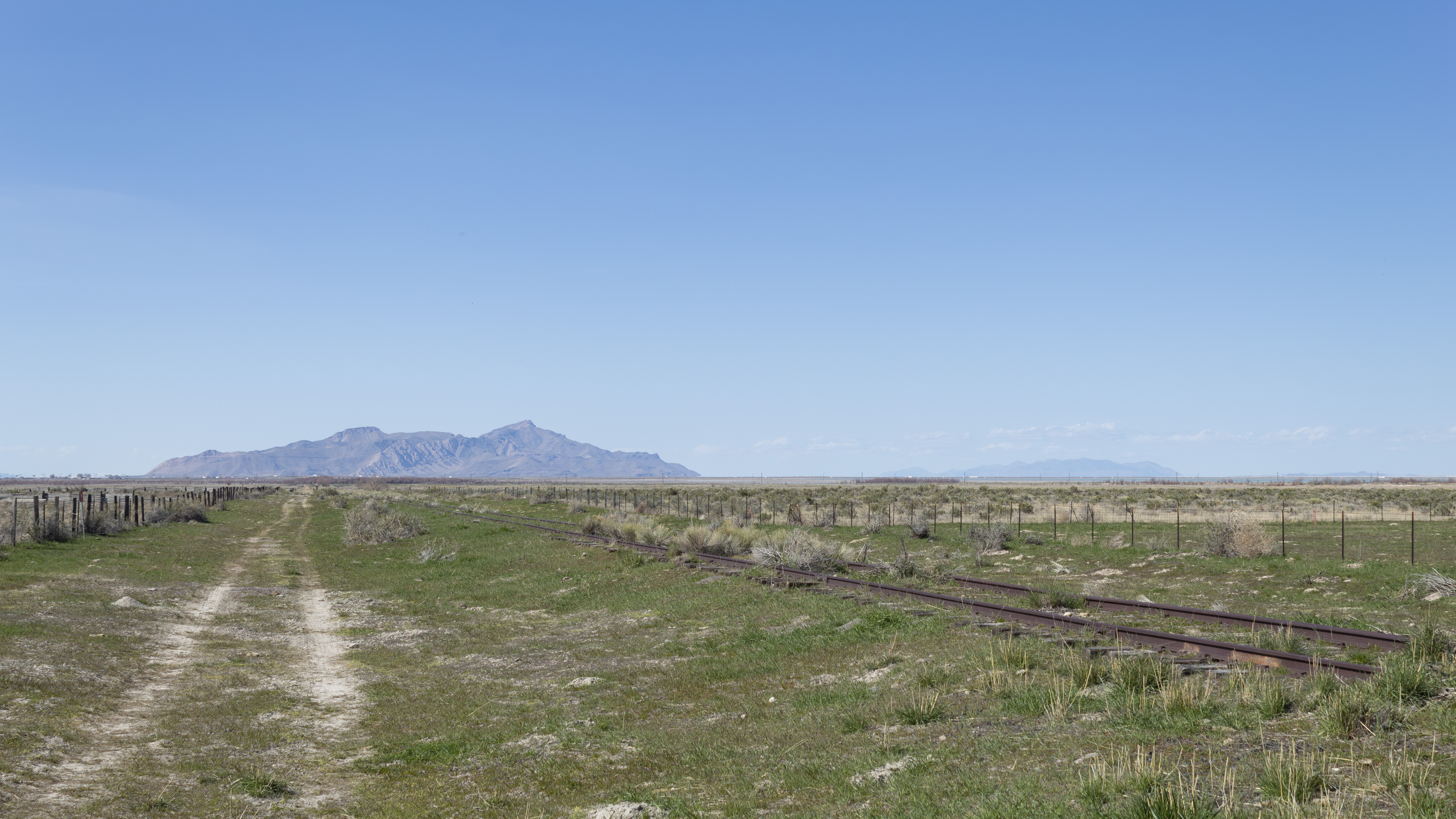
End of the former Western Pacific Warner Branch in 2024; prior to restoration as Savage Tooele Railroad

In 2020, the Romney Group (owned by Josh Romney, son of Utah senator Mitt Romney) and NorthPoint Development broke ground on the Lakeview Business Park, north of the Utah Motorsports Campus. The Savage Tooele Railroad was founded as a common carrier railroad under parent company Savage (who operate the nearby Savage Bingham and Garfield Railroad in Salt Lake County) to restore and operate the Warner Branch to the business park and filed an appeal in 2021 with the Surface Transportation Board to begin construction of the railroad line. The project was backed by Utah governor Spencer Cox and representatives John Curtis and Chris Stewart, but concerns were raised by the Environmental Protection Agency due to the railroad's proximity to wetlands near the Great Salt Lake. Tooele County agreed to replace a segment of the Mid-Valley Trail right of way with a bypass segment, to clear the right of way for the Savage Tooele Railroad. Motions to begin construction on the railroad were denied in 2021 and 2022, pending the completion of an environmental report which was finished in 2024, after a draft environmental report had been issued in 2023.

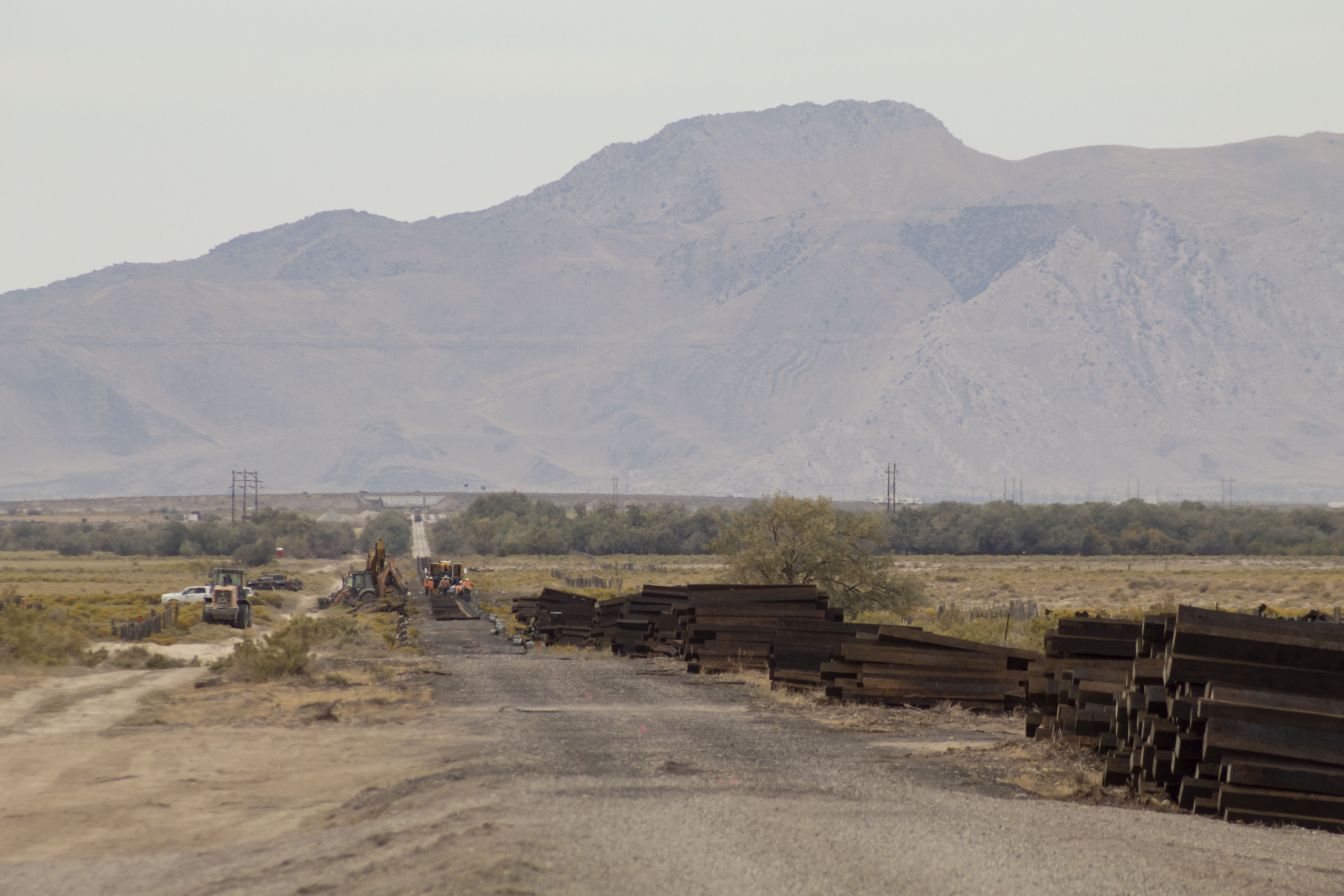
Construction along the right of way for the newly opened Savage Tooele Railroad approaching Marshall, Utah.

In February 2024, the STB granted permission to the Union Pacific Railroad to restore the upper portion of the Warner Branch to service for interchange with the Savage Tooele Railroad. BNSF Railway had appealed for lengthier STB proceedings to allow access to interchange with the Savage Tooele Railroad via trackage rights, however currently the STB has denied this appeal. Permission was granted by the STB for the Savage Tooele Railroad to begin construction from its connection with the Union Pacific to the Lakeview Business Park in April that year. The railroad will also serve the Twenty Wells Project associated with the Utah Inland Port in Grantsville, Utah. Residents of Erda, Utah and Utah Physicians for a Healthy Environment jointly filed a petition for reconsideration with the Surface Transportation Board opposing the railroad in early May, citing impacts the Lakeview Business Park and railroad would bring to the surrounding area, which the railroad described as a position "without merit". Public open houses were held for the project on June 25 and August 19 in Erda and Grantsville, where local residents requested the railroad operate their grade crossings as a quiet zone. The railroad denied this request noting the projected train frequency of a single train a day didn't justify equipping grade crossings through Erda with the equipment necessary to operate as a quiet zone. A groundbreaking ceremony for the project was held on November 7, 2024. A petition from Utah Physicians for a Healthy Environment and the Erda Community Association to overturn the railroad's STB approval was denied by the STB on March 3, 2025.

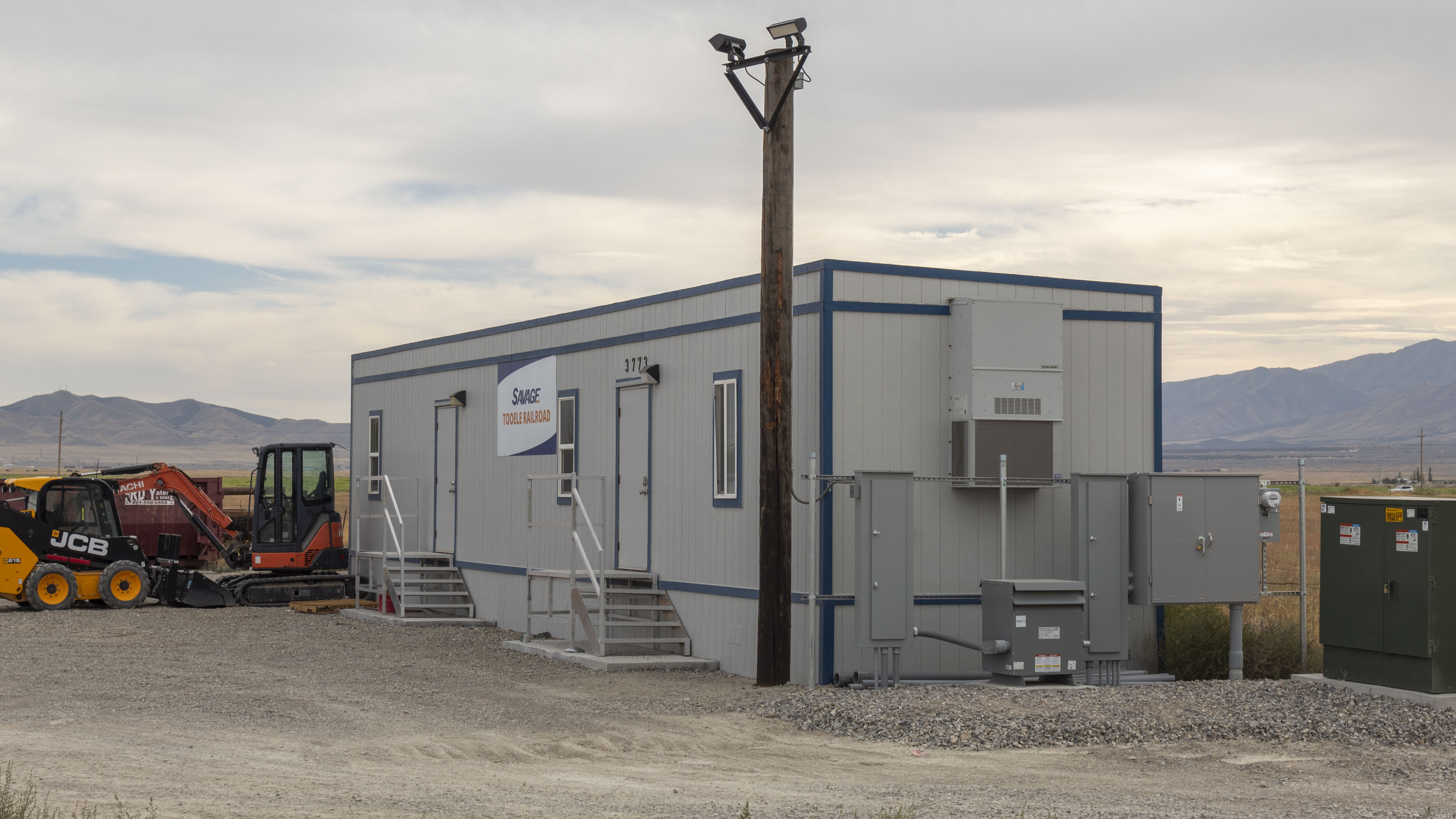
A field office for the Savage Tooele Railroad project in Marshall, Utah

The railroad held an official opening ceremony on September 17, 2025. BNSF continues to appeal for interchange access to the railroad following its opening. At the end of October 2025 the Interstate Business Park announced their intention to connect into the railroad.

In late 2026, the railroad was renamed the Cando Tooele Railroad following Savage's acquisition by Cando Rail & Terminals.
