= Dugway, Utah =

- CDP
- Location in Tooele County and the state of Utah

- Location of Utah in the United States
- Coordinates: 40°13′55″N 112°44′50″W
- Country: United States
- State: Utah
- County: Tooele
- Established: 1942

Area
  - Total: 5.2 sq mi (13.5 km^{2})
  - Land: 5.2 sq mi (13.5 km^{2})
  - Water: 0 sq mi (0.0 km^{2})
- Elevation: 4,935 ft (1,504 m)

Population (2020)
  - Total: 342
  - Density: 66/sq mi (25.4/km^{2})
- Time zone: UTC-7 (Mountain (MST))
  - Summer (DST): UTC-6 (MDT)
- ZIP code: 84022
- Area code: 435
- FIPS code: 49-20450
- GNIS feature ID: 2408694

Dugway is a census-designated place (CDP) in southeastern Tooele County, Utah, United States. The population was 342 at the 2020 census, a continued decrease from the 2010 figure of 795. The town is located inside the United States Army's large weapons testing facility, Dugway Proving Ground, making it a closed city, as the only roads leading to the town pass through military checkpoints at the boundaries of the base. Non-resident civilians must request advance authorization to enter the town. The housing area designated for military and civilian personnel is referred to as "English Village."

The name "Dugway" comes from a technique to dig a trench along a hillside to keep a wagon from tipping.

== Geography ==
According to the United States Census Bureau, the CDP has a total area of 5.2 square miles (13.5 km^{2}), all land.

=== Climate ===
According to the Köppen Climate Classification system, Dugway has a semi-arid climate, abbreviated "BSk" on climate maps.

Climate data for Dugway, Utah (1991–2020)
Month	Jan	Feb	Mar	Apr	May	Jun	Jul	Aug	Sep	Oct	Nov	Dec	Year
Mean daily maximum °F (°C)	39.7 (4.3)	46.5 (8.1)	56.9 (13.8)	63.8 (17.7)	74.5 (23.6)	86.8 (30.4)	96.0 (35.6)	93.7 (34.3)	82.7 (28.2)	67.2 (19.6)	51.8 (11.0)	39.5 (4.2)	66.6 (19.2)
Daily mean °F (°C)	28.1 (−2.2)	34.8 (1.6)	42.9 (6.1)	49.4 (9.7)	58.8 (14.9)	69.7 (20.9)	78.3 (25.7)	76.4 (24.7)	65.1 (18.4)	50.8 (10.4)	38.2 (3.4)	27.7 (−2.4)	51.7 (10.9)
Mean daily minimum °F (°C)	16.5 (−8.6)	23.1 (−4.9)	28.9 (−1.7)	35.0 (1.7)	43.0 (6.1)	52.7 (11.5)	60.7 (15.9)	59.1 (15.1)	47.6 (8.7)	34.4 (1.3)	24.6 (−4.1)	15.8 (−9.0)	36.8 (2.7)
Average precipitation inches (mm)	0.69 (18)	0.63 (16)	0.79 (20)	1.05 (27)	1.11 (28)	0.56 (14)	0.46 (12)	0.45 (11)	0.59 (15)	0.81 (21)	0.55 (14)	0.57 (14)	8.26 (210)
Average snowfall inches (cm)	4.1 (10)	3.4 (8.6)	1.6 (4.1)	1.3 (3.3)	0.0 (0.0)	0.0 (0.0)	0.0 (0.0)	0.0 (0.0)	0.0 (0.0)	0.0 (0.0)	1.1 (2.8)	3.5 (8.9)	15 (37.7)
Source: NOAA

== Demographics ==
Historical population
Census	Pop.	Note	%±
1970	2,357		—
1980	1,646		−30.2%
1990	1,761		7.0%
2000	2,016		14.5%
2010	795		−60.6%
2020	342		−57.0%

As of the census of 2000, there were 2,016 people, 343 households, and 263 families residing in the CDP. The population density was 387.4 people per square mile (149.7/km^{2}). There were 572 housing units at an average density of 109.9/sq mi (42.5/km^{2}). The racial makeup of the CDP was 63.10% White, 15.03% African American, 8.43% Native American, 2.83% Asian, 0.50% Pacific Islander, 1.88% from other races, and 8.23% from two or more races. Hispanic or Latino of any race were 5.75% of the population.

There were 343 households, out of which 51.0% had children under the age of 18 living with them, 66.5% were married couples living together, 6.1% had a female householder with no husband present, and 23.3% were non-families. 21.9% of all households were made up of individuals, and 0.9% had someone living alone who was 65 years of age or older. The average household size was 3.01 and the average family size was 3.59.

In the CDP, the population was spread out, with 34.4% under the age of 18, 33.4% from 18 to 24, 21.6% from 25 to 44, 10.1% from 45 to 64, and 0.5% who were 65 years of age or older. The median age was 20 years. For every 100 females, there were 47.0 males. For every 100 females age 18 and over, there were 48.5 males.

The median income for a household in the CDP was $49,306, and the median income for a family was $53,148. Males had a median income of $40,565 versus $17,695 for females. The per capita income for the CDP was $11,023. About 5.4% of families and 10.0% of the population were below the poverty line, including 15.7% of those under age 18 and none of those age 65 or over.

== Education ==
All parts of Tooele County are in the Tooele School District. Dugway Schools is the local K-12 school.

== See also ==
- List of census-designated places in Utah
- Utah State Route 261 for Moki Dugway
