= Tooele High School =

Location
- 301 West Vine Street; Tooele, Utah 84074; United States; 40°31′47″N 112°18′27″W

Information
- Type: Public
- Motto: Forever and Forever in Tooele
- Established: 1913
- School district: Tooele County School District
- Principal: Jeff Wyatt
- Assistant Principal: Jared Small
- Assistant Principal: Garret Rose
- Assistant Principal: Kaycee Roberts
- Teaching staff: 86.35 (FTE)
- Grades: 9-12
- Enrollment: 1,878 (2023–2024)
- Student to teacher ratio: 21.75
- Color
- Mascot: White Buffalo
- Website: tooelehigh.tooeleschools.org

Tooele High School is a secondary school located in Tooele, Utah, United States currently educating students in grades 9–12. Operated by the Tooele County School District, Tooele High enrolls approximately 1,800 students each year. The Tooele High mascot is the White Buffalo.

== History ==
Tooele High opened for the 1913 school year. In 1955 a new high school was behind the old building, while the older building continued to be used by Tooele County School District until its demolition in 1974. The current school was built to the west of the second high school, and was opened for the remainder of the 2002–2003 school year. The school celebrated its centennial during the 2012–2013 school year.

The campus, in the 1990s, was across the street from the city swimming pool. Students used the swimming pool, which the district leased from the city, and students also used the park area during lunchtime.

In 1997, 170 more students joined the student body. That year, due to overcrowding, the school added one minute to passing time.

== Academics ==
Tooele High offers multiple AP and Honors classes, and offers Concurrent Enrollment through Utah State University, Salt Lake Community College, and Utah Valley University including classes offered at different schools in the district (*).

=== AP Classes Offered ===
- AP English Literature and Composition
- AP English Language and Composition
- AP Calculus AB/BC
- AP Statistics
- AP Physics C: Mechanics
- AP Biology
- AP Chemistry
- AP World History: Modern
- AP US Government and Politics
- AP United States History
- AP European History
- AP Psychology
- AP Studio Art
- AP Music Theory

== Activities ==
Tooele High School offers students the following clubs and organizations:

- Art Club
- Band
- Bowling Club
- Buffalog
- Buff Radio
- Cheerleading
- Show Choir
- Chamber Strings
- Color Guard (Majestix)
- Dance Company
- Debate Club
- Drama Club
- Drill Team (Sha-ronns)
- FBLA
- FCCLA
- FFA
- French Club
- German Club
- GSA
- Herd Club
- HOSA
- Key Club
- Literary Magazine
- MESA
- National Honor Society
- Orchestra
- Psychology Club
- SkillsUSA
- Spanish Club
- Swim Team
- Student Government
- T.A.A.G.
- Team Buffalo
- Tooele Sign Pride
- Water Polo
- Yearbook
- Z-Motion Ballroom

== Athletics ==
Tooele High competes in the USHAA classification of 4A in Region 10. Tooele High focuses on football and basketball, but also has strong swimming and softball teams. The most recent state titles being 2002 3A state football, 2005 3A state boys basketball, 2019 4A state girls softball. Tooele High has a strong rivalry with Stansbury High School, and continues to have a basic rivalry with Grantsville High School.

=== State championships ===
- Baseball: 1996.
- Boys basketball: 2005.
- Girls basketball: 1976–77, 1991–92
- Football: 1934, 1937, 2002
- Boys golf: 1977–78, 1998–99
- Boys soccer: 1997
- Softball: 1991, 1992, 1998, 2003, 2004, 2005, 2007, 2008, 2010, 2019
- Girls swimming: 1999, 2001(tie with Cedar)
- Boys swimming: 1955, 1956, 1957, 1958, 1959, 1960, 1961, 1962, 1963, 1982, 1983, 1984, 1985, 2002
- Wrestling: 1981

== Notable alumni ==
- Keever Jankovich, NFL player
- Ron Rydalch, NFL player
- Eugene E. Campbell, Utah historian
- Beverly White, longest-serving woman in the Utah State Legislature
