= Keever Jankovich =

American football player (1928–1979)

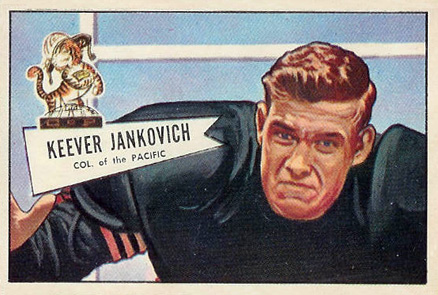
- Jankovich on a 1952 Bowman football card

No. 55, 53
- Positions: Linebacker, Defensive end

Personal information
- Born: January 6, 1928; Wilmington, North Carolina, U.S.
- Died: February 23, 1979 (aged 51); El Dorado County, California, U.S.
- Listed height: 6 ft 0 in (1.83 m)
- Listed weight: 215 lb (98 kg)

Career information
- High school: Tooele (Tooele, Utah)
- College: Santa Ana (1948); Utah (1949); Pacific (1950–1951)
- NFL draft: 1952: 5th round, 60th overall pick

Career history
- Cleveland Browns (1952)*; Dallas Texans (1952); Baltimore Colts (1953)*; Chicago Cardinals (1953)
- * Offseason or practice squad member only

Career NFL statistics
- Fumble recoveries: 2
- Stats at Pro Football Reference

Keever David Jankovich (January 6, 1928 – February 23, 1979) was an American professional football player who played two seasons in the National Football League (NFL) with the Dallas Texans and Chicago Cardinals. He was selected by the Cleveland Browns in the fifth round of the 1952 NFL draft. He played college football at Santa Ana Junior College, the University of Utah, and the University of the Pacific.

== Early life and college ==
Keever David Jankovich was born on January 6, 1928, in Wilmington, North Carolina. He attended Tooele High School in Tooele, Utah.

Jankovich first played college football at Santa Ana Junior College in 1948. He then transferred to play for the Utah Utes of the University of Utah in 1949. He transferred once more to play for the Pacific Tigers of the University of the Pacific, and was a two-year letterman from 1950 to 1951.

== Professional career ==
Jankovich was selected by the Cleveland Browns in the fifth round, with the 60th overall pick, of the 1952 NFL draft. On September 24, 1952, it was reported that he had been waived.

On September 29, 1952, Jankovich was claimed off waivers by the Dallas Texans. He played in ten games, starting seven, for the Texans in 1952, returning three kicks for 45 yards and recovering one fumble. He became a free agent after the season.

Jankovich signed with the Baltimore Colts on April 30, 1953. He was waived on August 20, 1953.

Jankovich was signed by the Chicago Cardinals in late August 1953. He was waived on September 22 before the start of the season. He re-signed with the Cardinals on October 22, and started two games for them that year, before being released again on November 3, 1953.

== Personal life ==
Jankovich served in the United States Navy. He died on February 23, 1979, in El Dorado County, California.
