= Tooele Valley Railway =

Historic railway in Tooele County, Utah, United States

- Tooele Valley Railway #3 a 0-6-0 crossing the Middle Canyon Trestle in an undated photograph from the early 1900s.

Overview
- Headquarters: Tooele, Utah
- Reporting mark: TOV
- Locale: Tooele, Utah
- Dates of operation: 1908–1982

Technical
- Track gauge: 4 ft 8 1/2 in (1,435 mm) standard gauge
- Length: 9.42 miles (15 km)

Other
- Website: Tooele Valley Museum and Historic Park

The Tooele Valley Railway was a railroad founded in 1908, and owned by the Anaconda Copper corporation. The line ran from a connection with the Union Pacific Railroad and the Western Pacific Railroad at Warner Station on the western edge of Tooele, Utah, to a terminus at the International Smelting and Refining Company smelter operations on the eastern edge of Tooele. The line was abandoned around 1982, nearly a decade after the smelter closure and the end of production at the nearby Carr Fork Mine.

The Tooele Station has been preserved to form the Tooele Valley Museum and Historic Park and has been registered on the National Register of Historic Places as the Tooele Valley Railroad Complex.

== Description ==
The Tooele Valley Railway was founded in 1908, by the Utah Consolidated Mining Company to connect the International Smelter to the Los Angeles and Salt Lake Railroad (later bought out by the Union Pacific Railroad). In 1917 the Western Pacific Railroad built a branch line to connect with the Tooele Valley Railway The line ran from a connection with the mainline on the west end of Tooele, Utah, to the smelter located on the bench of the Oquirrh Mountains.

A large portion of the Tooele Valley Railway was a street-running railroad, traveling through Vine Street until reaching Tooele Station. The grade traveled out of the city until crossing a wooden trestle at the mouth of Middle Canyon. In later years the trestle was filled in with rock overburden to stabilize it. The grade continued along the mountain bench until reaching the smelter. At its steepest point the railroad reached a 2.4% grade. In 1937 a branch line was built connecting the line to the Elton Tunnel.

Due to the steep grades to the smelter, followed by the street running on Vine Street downgrade, the railroad normally operated with the caboose facing uphill and the locomotive shoving from the rear to prevent runaway railcars. A crew member riding the front of the caboose would protect the shove uphill, and several of the railroad's cabooses were outfitted with airhorns the railroad could use to warn oncoming traffic.

== History ==
Tooele Valley Railway through Tooele's New Town neighborhood

The Tooele Valley Railway was incorporated on November 18, 1908; with a charter outlining a route from Black Rock through Tooele City to the International Smelter site. Original estimates for the proposed route to Black Rock were for an approximately 25 mile route. Construction rights through Tooele City along Vine Street were granted by Mayor Albert Walters on January 15, 1909; with a stipulation that the railroad would only have rights to operate steam locomotives along the route for two years after construction, with the railroad promising to eventually convert to electric power. Construction started shortly afterwards with surveying commencing in December, and the first train was run behind borrowed locomotive SPLA&SL #3605 as far as the Middle Canyon trestle on April 1, 1909. The first passenger ticket was sold to C.R. McBride for $0.20 on June 8 later that same year. Early passenger service was provided by a gasoline powered motorcar. During construction of the railroad in 1909, it would be reported two workers who were part of over 100 Mexican immigrants who were hired for the project; got into a duel in Tooele where they inflicted bullet and knife wounds on each other. A 1910 extension pushed the railroad's steam license forward one more year, with the railroad reporting selling 1500 daily fares for passengers immigrating to Tooele for development of the "New Town" neighborhood.

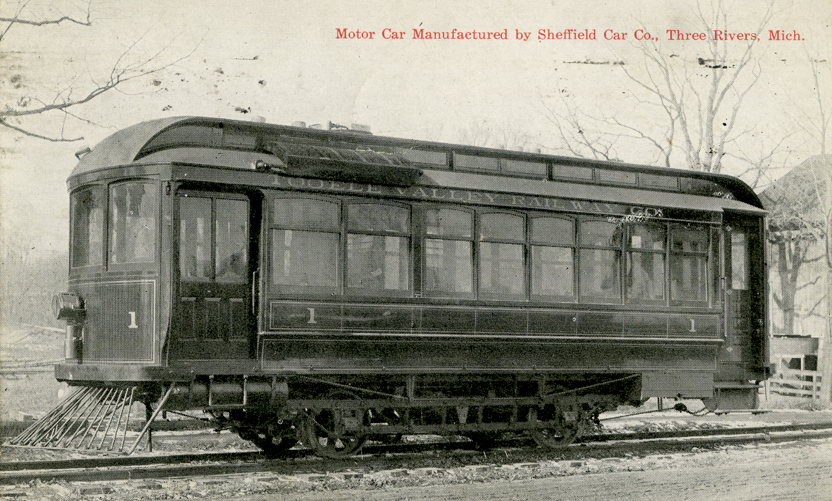
Postcard of Tooele Valley Railway 1, a Sheffield Car Co. built motor car outside their factory in Three Rivers, Michigan.

The SPLA&SL station at the end of the Tooele Valley Railway would be renamed Warner after the completion of the Tooele Valley Railway's Tooele Station on Broadway. The station name Warner was taken from John Henry Warner the first track foreman of the Tooele Valley Railway who lived in a house adjacent to the Tooele station on Broadway. The first superintendent of the railroad was C.E. Burke. Joseph Earl Tate (father of Maxine Grimm) was the first telegraph agent at the Tooele Valley's depot in 1910. It was reported at the time of the railroad's opening nine clerks worked the line dedicated to way bills, wages and ticket sales along with representatives of American Express for package shipping.

The Tooele Valley Railway would host celebrations of "Old Folks Day" a local holiday at the time, with special excursions from Warner to the Smelter. The railroad would also host a special excursion and tour of the International Smelter for the Independent Order of Odd Fellows and International Association of Rebekah Assemblies societies in 1910. In 1911 the railroad would renegotiate its operating license with Tooele City, abandoning plans to electrify the railroad and extending the license to operate steam locomotives by another 25 years with the railroad paying Tooele $5000 for road upgrades (the railroad would end up operating steam locomotives until 1963). In 1913 the San Pedro, Los Angeles & Salt Lake Railroad and the Tooele Valley Railway would participate in a joint "education special" exhibition train with agricultural displays making a stop on the Tooele Valley Railway depot. A stranded train in heavy snow on December 21, 1916, would require railroad workers to collect snow to melt to keep the water levels high inside a stuck steam locomotive until the train could be rescued on Christmas Day.

An unknown man who was traveling in a party of six, was shot at by Earl M. Parson for approaching the Middle Canyon Trestle after refusing to yield on October 7, 1917. With heightened security during World War One two guards were assigned to the bridge to prevent sabotage, and it was assumed the six strangers were potential saboteurs. The Tooele Valley Railway, represented by J.B Whitehall along with representatives of the Nevada Northern Railway, Utah Railway and the Tonopah and Goldfield Railroad were among the western railroads who protested to the Interstate Commerce Commission regarding a proposed railroad grouping in 1923. A 1922 derailment on the Western Pacific mainline would re-route passenger trains to and from Salt Lake City via the Western Pacific's Tooele Branch and onto the Union Pacific mainline through the connection of the two roads on the Tooele Valley Railway. In 1925 the Tooele Valley Railway received a cash settlement from the U.S. Government as compensation for the time the railroad was under United States Railroad Administration control.

In 1929 a lawsuit was brought against the railroad by Jessie Scorey Thomas against the railroad for the death of her husband, Odell Thomas, a brakeman on the railroad who was killed while switching cars at International. The court ruled the railroad owed a $5000 award for the death of the brakeman. On October 26, 1932, a train collided with a car carrying then 15-year-old driver Lydia Atkin and her 11-year-old sister Alenn. Both siblings survived the accident. On January 24, 1933, a hard winter storm froze the flangeway between the rails on the Vine Street segment of the railroad, causing a freight train hauled by locomotive #12 to derail near the intersection of Coleman and Vine. The locomotive was flipped on its side, but the only injury to the five crew members riding in the engine cab was a dislocated vertebra suffered by Albert Petras. A strike at the International Smelter in 1936 lead to then superintendent Joseph Earl Tate deputizing six railroad employees in response. A 1937 blizzard would temporarily shut down the railroad and smelter due to heavy snow drifts. Shortly afterwards Claud LeRoy Blackburn, 16; was killed when a train collided with a truck he was riding in along Vine Street.

Hearings would be held at the state capitol during December 1939 to hear the Tooele Valley Railway's petition to end passenger service on the railroad. Railroad manager E.R. Phelps would testify the loss of passenger revenue was due to competition from automobiles, allowing more and more smelter workers to take their car to work along with the railroad's passenger fair of $0.05 causing an operational loss. The Tooele community protested the move due to poor road conditions in winter making access to the smelter difficult in poor weather. Permission to drop public passenger service was finally given in 1941 due to anticipated freight traffic increases from the Elton Tunnel branch. Shift trains for smelter workers however would continue though until 1946.

In 1942, a fire would break out at the International Smelter, which would spread through the Tooele Valley Railway's locomotive shop destroying the structure. The construction of the Elton Tunnel provided overburden to fill in the Middle Canyon Trestle, increasing train weights over the bridge which the Tooele Valley Railway demonstrated in 1943 with a special train with multiple locomotives hauling it. A 1948 blizzard would strand locomotive #11 on the line, with railroad engineer Marion Bevan attending to the stranded train until it was rescued.

Although the Tooele Valley Railway did not choose to purchase a diesel locomotive at the time, it was one of the railroads where Baldwin DRS-6-4-1500 #1501 was demonstrated during a national railroad tour in the late 1940s, following its stay at the Tooele Valley the locomotive would be bought by the nearby Kennecott railroad. On February 2, 1955, a special train event ran on the Tooele Valley Railway featuring steam locomotive #11 and visiting Budd Rail Diesel Car #375 from the Western Pacific Railroad running a railfan excursion to the smelter. The Tooele Valley Railway would begin conversion to diesel power later in 1955. In 1958 the Tooele Valley Railway would cooperate with the Tooele Army Depot on a special Armed Forces Day excursion, with train departures from the Tooele Valley Railway along the Western Pacific Railway into the military base. In the mid-1960s a train hit a car crossing Seventh Street, killing a child in the car.

Discussions on abandoning the railroad from parent company Anaconda Copper began in 1971 as the smelter's shut down approached. The smelter closed in 1972, and the railroad lost its main revenue source. With the smelter closed, the railroad ran a freight train in February of that year unsure if it would be the railroad's final revenue run or not. The Tooele Valley Railway was used to haul away scrap from the demolition of the smelter site. The railroad briefly served the Carr Fork Mine project during the late 1970s. The Tooele Valley Railway was considered as a potential option for ore haulage out of the Carr Fork Mine, however a new rail spur off the Union Pacific mainline was considered as well to bypass the Tooele Valley Railway to allow the Union Pacific direct access to ore trains and the slag piles at the smelter for use as potential railroad ballast. Ultimately both the Tooele Valley Railway and a new Union Pacific extension were not chosen in favor of trucking ore to a transload site located along the Union Pacific mainline. Union Pacific Railroad's Warner depot which had served the interchange point between the Tooele Valley Railway and the UP, burned down in December 1975.

The last revenue train ran on July 7, 1980. For the following two years, the railroad's final superintendent Don Lee would remain to staff the Tooele depot where he worked alone in the office prior to the railroad's closure and the station's conversion into a museum. An intent to abandon the railroad was filed in 1981. With the line's abandonment approaching, rescue trains were run to assemble the collection at the soon to be museum site at the Tooele depot, with a particular effort dedicated to moving locomotive #11 from its display in a city park to the new museum with the aid of the railroad and crews from the Tooele Army Depot. After a minor derailment, and difficulties with SW900 #104's throttle cut-out, #11 would be successfully freed from the park and brought to the new museum site. The Tooele Valley Railway was abandoned in 1982, with track removal and road rehabilitation along Vine Street throughout the year.

Reclamation of the grade was performed as part of the Superfund program.

== Locomotives ==
The Tooele Valley Railway owned several steam locomotives. During the majority of the steam era, the line owned four 2-8-0 locomotives, numbers #9 through #12. The line also operated an 0-6-0 locomotive #3, and a 2-6-0 locomotive #2. The majority of the line's steam locomotives were retired in 1955, when an EMD SW1200 locomotive #100 was purchased, later an EMD SW900 locomotive was purchased from Pickering Lumber Company in 1966, becoming locomotive #104. Locomotive #11 was kept as a back up for the diesel locomotive until 1963.

== Preservation ==
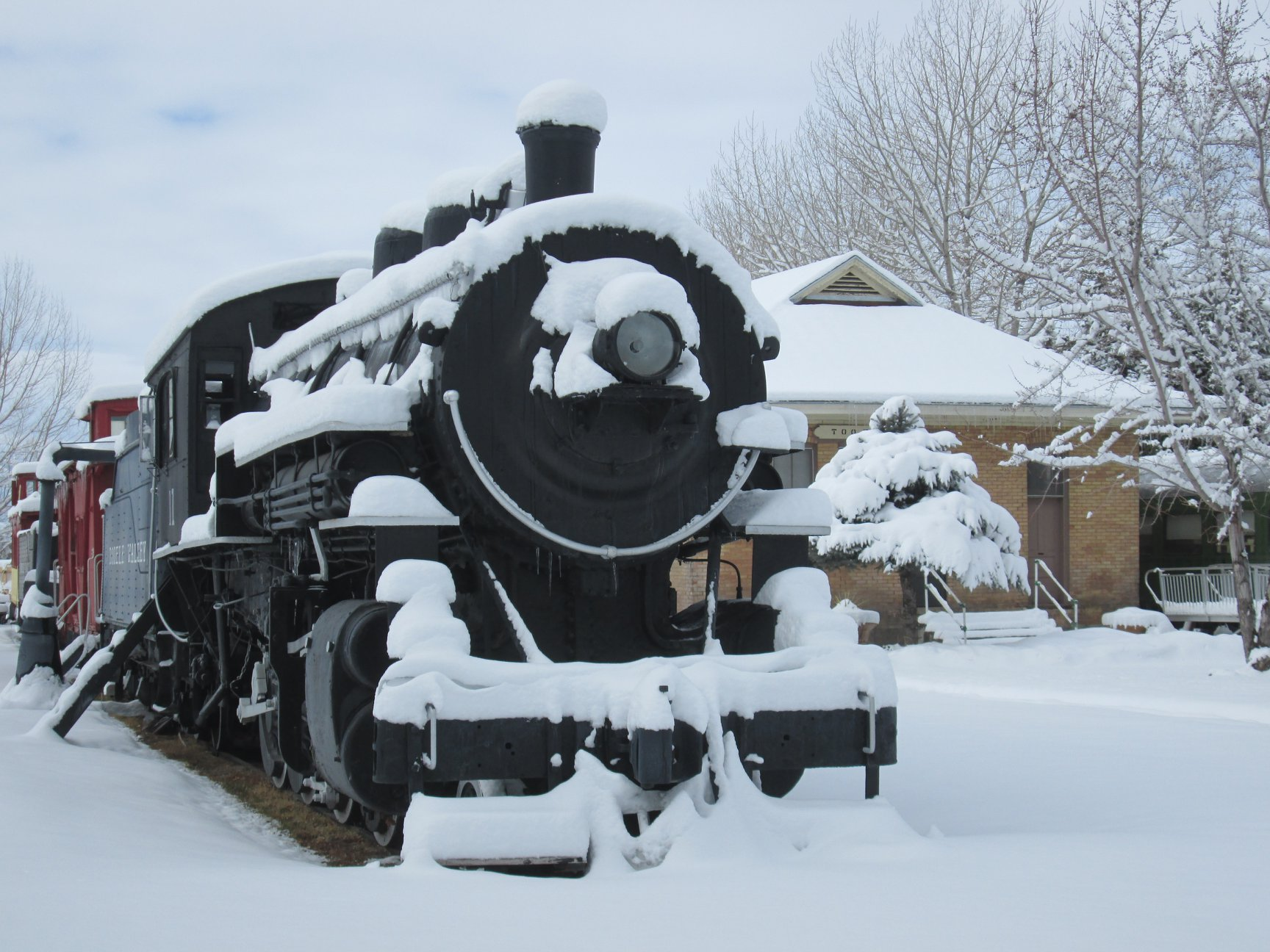
Tooele Valley Railway #11 on static display in Tooele City in 2018.

Locomotive #11 and #12 were built as part of an order of 2-8-0's for the Buffalo and Susquehanna Railroad by the American Locomotive Company at their Brooks Locomotive Works in 1910. Bankruptcy caused the Buffalo and Susquehanna to cancel the order, and ALCO kept the locomotives until selling them. #11 and #12 were sent to the Tooele Valley Railway in 1912. Locomotive #11 would be preserved after retirement in 1963. #12 was scrapped in 1956, with the tender being used to mount a snowplow. #11 would be the last steam locomotive in Utah to be used in revenue freight service. First displayed near the intersection of Vine Street and 200 West. Restoration of the #11 back to operation was considered for the rebuilding of The Great Saltair in 1968 to coincide with the centennial of the completion of the First Transcontinental Railroad, and again in 1969 with the planning for the Wasatch Railway Museum. The proposal to move the locomotive to Heber was met with impassioned debate, with many arguing that if the city were to keep the locomotive the community would have to provide better care for the locomotive. #11 was moved to the Tooele Valley Railroad Museum in 1982 via rail.

The museum also preserved the snowplow mounted to locomotive #12's tender, several pieces of Maintenance of way equipment, and a pair of caboose from the railway. Locomotive #100 and #104 were sold to new owners.

It is also believed Ferrocarriles Nacionales de México #2501 a former Hines Construction company engine was likely used as Tooele Valley Railway #1 during the route's early years before it was transferred to Mexico, it is preserved in Monterrey, Mexico.

== See also ==
- List of Utah railroads
- Anaconda Copper
- List of Superfund sites in Utah
