= Dugway Schools =

Location
- 5020 5th Avenue; Dugway, Utah 84022; United States
- Coordinates: 40°13′38″N 112°44′58″W

Information
- Type: Public, K-12 high school
- School district: Tooele County School District
- Principal: Darren Westhora
- Staff: 16.24 (FTE)
- Grades: K-12
- Enrollment: 121 (2023-2024)
- Average class size: 14
- Student to teacher ratio: 7.45
- Colors: Maroon and white
- Mascot: Mustangs
- Website: dugwayschools.tooeleschools.org

Dugway Schools or Dugway School is a K-12 school in Dugway, Utah, United States.

The current principal is Darren Westhora. The school is part of the Tooele County School District.

The school mascot is the Mustang.

Sports provided at DHS include baseball, track/field, cross-country, volleyball, and basketball.

The school is most recognized for its Track and Field accomplishments. From 1993 to 2000 the Mustangs earned 7 region championship and 4 State championship and 4 second place finishes at the Utah State Track and Field meet. Also during that time the school won the prestigious BYU invitational meet for two consecutive years. Defeating over 50 schools from five States. The Mustangs had over 150 State individual champion's. The Mustangs 1998 team scored the most points (207) in the history of the Utah State High School Track and Field meet.

The principal and building (including the office area and staff, library, commons area, lunch room, band room, and gym) serves grades K-12. But the high school, 7-12, is run separate from elementary school, K-6.

DHS is equipped with a nearby off-campus building for religious education of LDS students, provided to students as requested by parents.

== History ==
In March 1983 the school began holding classes for only four days per week instead of five. This was done for one school quarter, and in July 1983 the school resumed holding classes for five days per week.

At one point the Dugway Elementary School had its own principal, with Dugway High School being treated as a separate school.
