= Utah dual language immersion =

Utah's dual language immersion program was created in 2008 to help students achieve proficiency in a second language, through immersion for half a day in a target language and half a day in English. Over 270 schools in Utah participate in the program, the fourth most in the country.

== Background ==
Senate Bill 80 (S.B. 80), The Critical Languages Program, sponsored by Senator Howard Stephenson, was passed in 2007, leading to the creation of initiatives that established a Governor's World Language Council; the Utah World Language Roadmap; and eventually the passing of S.B. 41 International Initiatives in 2008, the last of which led to the creation of Utah's dual language immersion program.

The program started with 21 schools in 2009 and grew quickly, with 41 schools in 2010, 57 in 2011, and 78 in 2012. The first languages taught were Spanish, French, and Mandarin Chinese, and have now expanded to include Portuguese, Russian, and German.

== Benefits ==
One of the stated goals of the program is to help students achieve proficiency in a second language in order to become participants in a global economy. Proven benefits for students also include an increased performance on standardized tests, fluency in a target language, and increased cultural awareness.

The program has also increased bonds between Utah and other countries, especially by hiring teachers from other countries.

== Pathway ==
Dual Language Immersion programs start in elementary school. Utah uses a 50/50 model, where students are immersed in a foreign language for half of the day, and in English for the other half. In junior high, students transition to having one or two classes in their target language.

Beginning in Fall 2016, high school students who pass an AP language course and exam in ninth grade will have the option to enroll in the Bridge Program, where they can enroll in one of three courses per school year that, if passed, will award them with concurrent upper-division university credit, leaving students only two credits shy of a minor in their immersion language by the time they arrive at the university. Seven of Utah's universities are involved in this Bridge Program. It began first with the University of Utah, but has expanded to include Brigham Young University, Utah State University, Weber State University, Utah Valley University, Southern Utah University, and Utah Tech University.

== Model ==
In the immersion language half of the day for grades 1–3, students spend 20% of their school day learning math; 15% in Social Studies, Science, Physical Education (P.E.), Art, Health, and Music; and 15% of their day in the target language literacy. For the other half of the day, students spend most of their time in English Language Arts, with the remaining 15% of the school day in English reinforcement of the subjects learned in their immersion language.

In grades 4 and 5, the percentage changes: 25% of the day is spent learning Math and Science in the immersion language, 25% in immersion language literacy, 25% in English Language Arts, 25% in Math and Social Studies in English, while Music, Art, P.E., and Health are taught in both languages.

In sixth grade, the learning schedule is mostly the same as in grades 4 and 5, but with a switch; the science and social studies classes have now switched places. Science is now taught in English, and Social Studies is now taught in the immersion language.

In the junior high years, students spend more time learning in English, but must take two courses taught in the immersion language: a world languages class, and either Foundations of Social Studies, Health/Humanities, or World Geography.

== Participating districts ==
The following school districts offer dual language immersion programs for the 2026–27 school year:

DISTRICT	Chinese	French	Spanish	German	Portuguese	Russian	Total (Note: Total counts reflect the total number of schools, which may be different from the total number of programs, as some schools offer multiple languages)
Alpine	12 schools	3	16		3		30
Box Elder	5	1	11				12
Cache	4	3	5		5		10
Canyons	8	7	13				21
Davis	12	8	14				31
Granite	6	6	16				26
Iron	3		3				6
Jordan	12	3	10		3		25
Logan			3		3		3
Murray			3				3
Nebo	4		4				5
North Sanpete			3				3
Ogden			5				5
Park City		4	4				6
Provo	2	2	5		3		8
Salt Lake City			8				8
South Summit			3				3
Tooele	3	3	9	3	6	3	17
Uintah			3				3
Wasatch			9				9
Washington County	18		14		5		24
Weber	5		6				10
Total	93	40	167	3	28	3	268 schools 334 programs

Several charter schools are also involved in the DLI program, in Lehi (Chinese), Bluffdale (German), Spanish Fork (Spanish), Salt Lake City (Spanish), West Valley City (Spanish), Provo (Spanish), and Layton (Spanish).

Most classes in the program are for English-native speakers. However, in areas of the state where there is a higher concentration of Spanish-speaking immigrants, an English Language immersion-style program is available. Because of the 50/50 style of the program, it is accessible for English learners as well.

Utah's DLI program has inspired similar dual language immersion programs throughout the United States, in places like Arizona, Delaware, Idaho, Wyoming, and South Carolina.

== Future of the program ==
The Tooele County School Board announced in 2023 they would be phasing out the district's Russian, Chinese, and German language programs. Tooele was the only district offering a Russian language immersion program.

In 2026, the Utah State Board of Education dissolved the state's Dual Language Immersion administration. The administration was responsible for developing curriculum and offering professional development for language teachers. These responsibilities will now fall to the individual districts.
