= Tooele Valley Railroad Complex =

- U.S. National Register of Historic Places
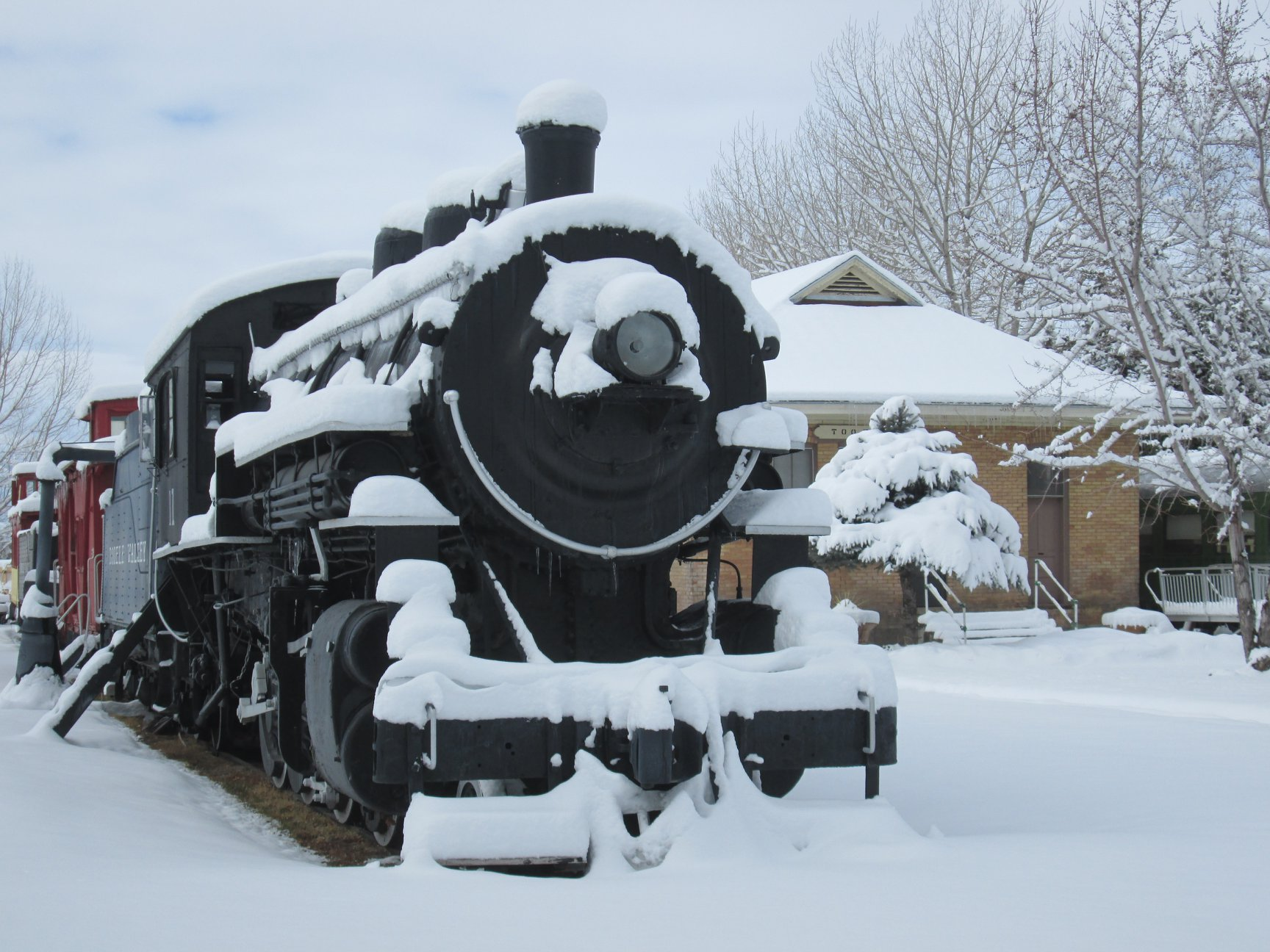
- Tooele Valley Railway #11 at the museum in 2018 after a fresh snowfall.

- Location within Utah Location within the United States
- Location: 35 N. Broadway, Tooele, Utah
- Coordinates: 40°31′52″N 112°17′17″W
- Area: 2.1 acres (0.85 ha)
- Built: 1909-1910
- NRHP reference No.: 84002426
- Added to NRHP: May 17, 1984

The Tooele Valley Railroad Complex, 35 N. Broadway in Tooele, Utah, dates from 1909. It was listed on the National Register of Historic Places in 1984.

Deck restoration on the Tooele Valley Railway depot in the museum in 2019.

The complex is currently operated as the Tooele Valley Museum and Historic Park (formerly Tooele Valley Railroad Museum and prior to that as the Tooele County Museum). Opened in 1983, the museum is operated by the city and features preserved locomotives, equipment and artifacts from the Tooele Valley Railway, International Smelting and Refining Company, and other railroad & mining artifacts.

The complex is significant for its historic role in conversion of Tooele from a farming-based to an industrial town. The railroad depot was the headquarters of the Tooele Valley Railway; and is the most significant surviving artifact with association to the smelter east of Tooele that operated from 1910 to 1972.

The listing included three contributing buildings and four contributing objects.
