= Deseret Peak Utah Temple =

Temple in Tooele, Utah

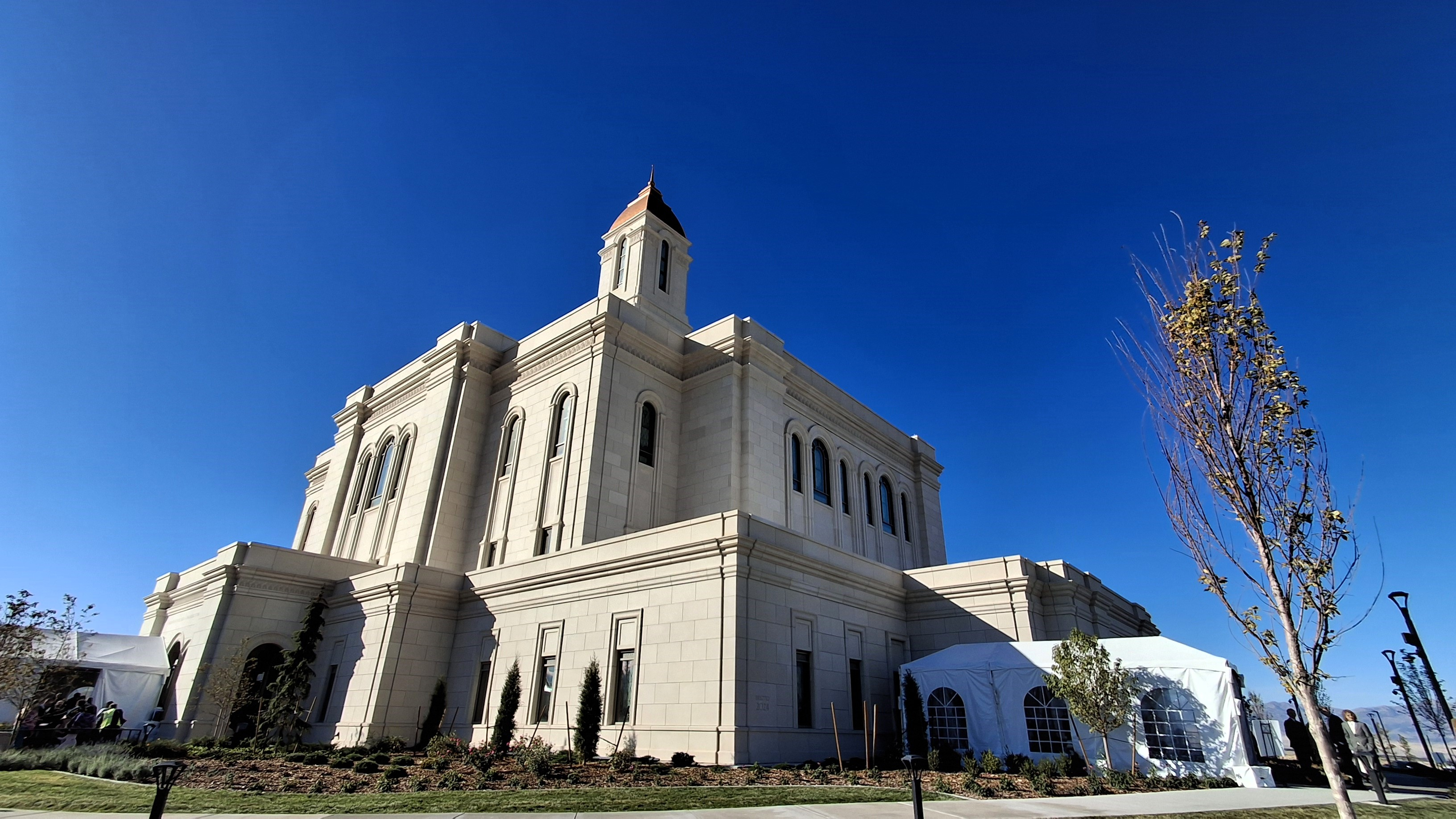
- Interactive map of Deseret Peak Utah Temple
- Number: 200
- Dedication: 10 November 2024, by Russell M. Nelson
- Site: 15.5 acres (6.3 ha)
- Floor area: 71,998 ft^{2} (6,688.8 m^{2})
- Official website • News & images

Church chronology
← Salvador Brazil Temple	Deseret Peak Utah Temple	→ Casper Wyoming Temple

Additional information
- Announced: 7 April 2019, by Russell M. Nelson
- Groundbreaking: 15 May 2021, by Brook P. Hales
- Open house: 26 September-19 October 2024
- Location: Tooele, Utah, United States
- Coordinates: 40.5726°N 112.3140°W
- Exterior finish: Cast stone
- Baptistries: 1
- Ordinance rooms: 4
- Sealing rooms: 4
- Notes: Announced by Russell M. Nelson on April 7, 2019, with name and location change announced January 19, 2021.

The Deseret Peak Utah Temple is a temple of the Church of Jesus Christ of Latter-day Saints in Tooele, Utah. Plans to construct a temple in the Tooele Valley were announced on April 7, 2019 by church president Russell M. Nelson, during general conference. The temple is the first in Tooele County and the 23rd in the state of Utah.

A groundbreaking ceremony, to signify the beginning of construction, was held on May 15, 2021, conducted by Brook P. Hales, a church general authority. The temple was dedicated by Nelson on November 10, 2024.

== History ==
The intent to build the temple was announced by Russell M. Nelson on April 7, 2019. A groundbreaking ceremony, to signify beginning of construction, was held on May 15, 2021, with Brook P. Hales presiding, and was attended by local church members and community leaders.

The temple is located on the corner of 2400 North and 400 West in Tooele. The temple was originally announced as the "Tooele Valley Utah Temple" along with a residential housing development and was to be located in Erda, at the intersection of Erda Way and State Route 36.

== Controversy ==
A local land developer received an approval on February 5, 2020 for a 50+ residential housing development to the south of the future temple development. On May 5, 2020 the Church of Jesus Christ of Latter-day Saints announced the Temple and the surrounding homes, including a 55 and older community. The developer had formed a local political action committee called: Erda Community Association or ECA 09/25/2018 to fight another nearby subdivision. Under his leadership they canvassed the community and collected signatures on a referendum to refer the county approval for the temple development and its zoning to the public on a ballot vote in November. The Church, sensing a long drawn out and very public battle looming, simply withdrew and canceled this temple and its competing residential development

The relocated temple and grounds design was simply a copy of the former design. It has three stories and 71,998 square feet.

According to those involved in its construction, the initial conflict over its location has subsided but the Erda community remains split over how this battle played out. There was however excitement for a new temple.

A public open house was held from September 26 to October 19, 2024. The temple was dedicated by Nelson on November 10, 2024.

== Design and architecture ==
The building has a pioneer-influenced design that took inspiration from historic tabernacles. The temple's architecture reflects the cultural heritage of the Tooele region and its spiritual significance to the church.

The temple sits on a 15.5-acre plot, and the landscaping around the temple features colorful bushes, plots of grass, and small trees. These elements are designed to provide a tranquil setting to enhance the sacred atmosphere of the site. The structure stands three stories tall, constructed with white cast stone.

The interior features art glass decorated with flowers native to the Tooele Valley, such as cliffrose and silvery lupine, centered around the baptistry, which is designed to create a spiritually uplifting environment. In addition to the baptistry, the temple includes four instruction rooms and four sealing rooms, each designed for ceremonial use.

The design includes elements representing symbolism from the Bible, providing deeper spiritual meaning to the temple's appearance and function. Symbolism is important to church members and includes a theme of tall arches in the windows and doorways; the arches are “used to represent Jesus Christ’s emergence from the tomb three days after His death.”

== Temple presidents ==
The church's temples are directed by a temple president and matron, each serving for a term of three years. The president and matron oversee the administration of temple operations and provide guidance and training for both temple patrons and staff. The first president of the Deseret Peak Utah Temple is Kenneth L. Hale, with the matron being Jennie W. Hale.

== Admittance ==
On June 17, 2024, the church announced that a public open house would be held from September 26-October 19, 2024 (excluding Sundays and Saturday, October 5). The temple was dedicated by Russell M. Nelson on November 10, 2024. Like all the church's temples, it is not used for Sunday worship services. To members of the church, temples are regarded as sacred houses of the Lord. Once dedicated, only church members with a current temple recommend can enter for worship.

== See also ==
Temples in Utah
Wasatch Front Temples
Temples along the Wasatch Front
- = Operating
- = Under construction
- = Announced
- = Temporarily Closed

- Comparison of temples of The Church of Jesus Christ of Latter-day Saints
- List of temples of The Church of Jesus Christ of Latter-day Saints
- List of temples of The Church of Jesus Christ of Latter-day Saints by geographic region
- Temple architecture (Latter-day Saints)
- The Church of Jesus Christ of Latter-day Saints in Utah
