= Tooele County School District =

Public school district in Tooele County, Utah, United States

Tooele County School District is a school district headquartered in Tooele, Utah, with the same boundary as Tooele County.

== History ==
Prior to 1983, Tooele County School District had a policy that allowed students from other school districts to attend Tooele County schools without prior permission. Additionally, the district allowed students who lived in Utah with other families, but whose parents lived outside of Utah, to attend Tooele County schools for free. However, in 1983, the district changed its policy and began requiring students in the former category to obtain permission from district officials before enrolling, and began requiring the latter to pay tuition fees. Notably, sponsored international students were still permitted to attend for free.

Increased growth in Tooele County throughout the 1990s led to concerns of overcrowding. In 1997, the board of trustees proposed a bond of $25 million to address the increase in student population in high schools. The proposal was later increased to $40–45 million to build a new high school in Stansbury Park.

In 2022, Mark Ernst assumed the role of superintendent in the Tooele County school district.

Tooele is the only school district in the state to offer all six languages of the Dual Language Immersion program (Spanish, Chinese, French, Portuguese, German, and Russian). However, in 2023 the district made the decision to discontinue and phase out their German, Russian, and Chinese programs.

On December 10th, 2024, the Toole County School District voted to add the Ten Commandments to its school curriculum alongside accompanying documents that the school board deems as historical, such as the Declaration of Independence, the United States Constitution and the Pledge of Allegiance in the classroom.

== Schools ==
K-12

- Dugway Schools

Junior and senior high schools

- Wendover High School

High schools

- Deseret Peak High School
- Grantsville High School
- Stansbury High School
- Tooele High School

Junior high schools

- Grantsville Junior High School
- Clarke N. Johnsen Junior High School
- Stansbury Junior High
- Tooele Junior High School

Elementary schools

- Copper Canyon
- Grantsville
- Ibapah
- Middle Canyon
- Northlake
- Old Mill
- Overlake
- Rose Springs
- Settlement Canyon
- Anna Smith
- Stansbury Park
- Sterling
- Twenty Wells
- Vernon
- West
- Willow

Alternative:

- Blue Peak High School
