= Stansbury High School =

Public school in Stansbury Park, Utah, US

Location
- 5300 Aberdeen Ln; Stansbury Park, Utah, United States

Information
- Type: Public
- Motto: Empowering Students to Learn and Succeed
- Established: 2009; 17 years ago
- School district: Tooele County
- Principal: Ethan Wilford
- Grades: 9–12
- Enrollment: 2,338 (2024-25)
- Colors: Blue, Black, and Silver
- Athletics: Baseball, Basketball, Cross Country, Football, Golf, Soccer, Softball, Swimming, Tennis, Track and Field, Volleyball, Wrestling, Ballroom, Cheerleading, Color Guard, Marching Band, Dance, Drill
- Athletics conference: UHSAA Class 4A Region XI
- Mascot: Stallion
- Newspaper: The Stall Street Journal
- Website: https://stansburyhigh.tooeleschools.org

Stansbury High School is a public four-year high school in the western United States, located in Stansbury Park, Utah. Established in 2009 as part of the Tooele County School District. Stansbury High is currently in the Utah High School Activities Association (UHSAA) Class 4A Region XI and its mascot is a Stallion. As of the 2018–2019 school year, Stansbury High has 1,849 students enrolled and 76 teachers, with a student-to-teacher ratio of approximately 24:1. Stansbury High School teaches the 9th through the 12th grades.
