= International Smelting and Refining Company =

Former ore refining facility in Tooele County, Utah, United States

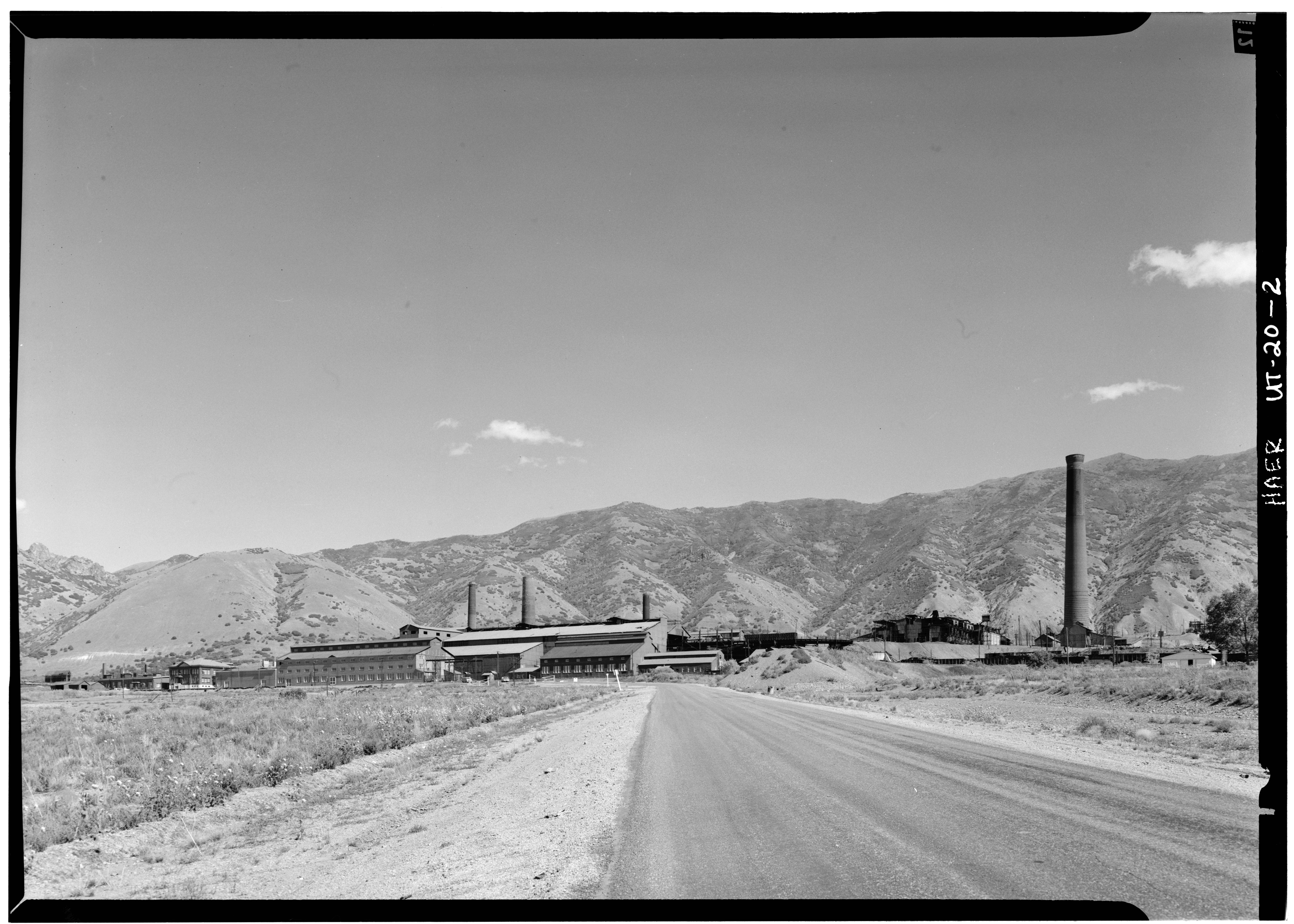
A view of the International Smelter near Tooele, Utah, facing east toward the Oquirrh Mountains, taken in August 1972, shortly after the facility shut down.

The International Smelting and Refining Company was a subsidiary of Anaconda Copper that operated primarily out of the International Smelter near Tooele, Utah. The International Smelter began operation in 1910 as a copper producer handling ores from Bingham Canyon and was expanded into a lead smelting operation in 1912. Copper smelting finished at International in 1946, and the lead smelter shut down in January 1972. The closure of the smelter would lead to the associated Tooele Valley Railway (which had their primary railyards at the smelter) to be shut down ten years later in 1982. The company also handled several other Anaconda owned interests. After the shut down of several of the International Smelting sites, environmental reclamation has been performed by Anaconda Copper's successor company ARCO and the EPA Superfund program.

== History ==
Interest in constructing a smelter outside of Tooele was begun by the Utah Consolidated Mining Company in the early 1900s due to the James Godfrey et al. v. American Smelting and Refining Company et al. lawsuit, which shut down several of the smelters operating in the Murray, Utah, area due to air pollution concerns. While several of the largest smelters in the area such as the ASARCO smelter in Murray were able to settle out of court, many of the smaller smelters such as the Utah Consolidated and Highland Boy shut down due to the court ruling. The mine and smelter owners who were affected by the lawsuit began to search for a new smelter site away from the populous Salt Lake Valley. A prime site was found in Tooele on the western slope of the Oquirrh Mountains which was isolated from the growing Salt Lake Valley, had strong headwinds which it was hoped would take most of the pollution up into the nearby Pine Canyon instead of towards nearby Tooele City, and was located close to the rapidly growing Bingham mining district. After negotiations to smelt the Highland Boy ores at the ASARCO copper smelter at Garfield, Utah, fell through, Utah Consolidated pushed for the founding of the International Smelting and Refining Company, which was formally founded on December 1, 1908, in New Jersey. Corporate offices for the company would at one point be located in New York City The Tooele Valley Railway, which was built to serve the smelter construction and operation, had been chartered in Utah on November 18, 1908.

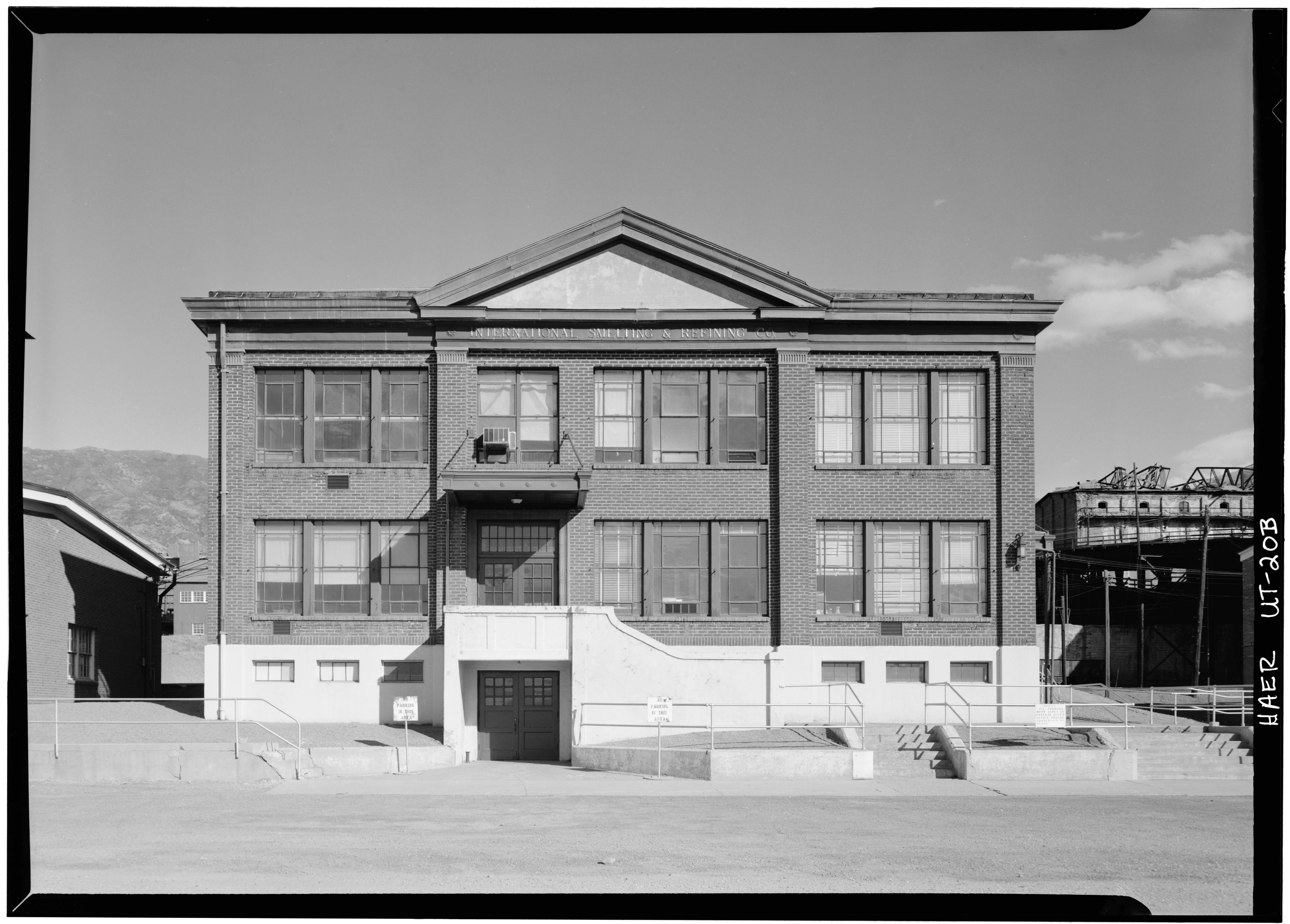
The administrative offices at the International Smelter site in Tooele. This building would survive long past the demolition of the smelter, being used as offices for the nearby Carr Fork Mine, before being finally demolished in the mid-1980s.

Construction on the smelter began on December 9, 1908, several days after the formal foundation of the company. Among the founders of the new smelter were mining moguls John D. Ryan and Thomas F. Cole who would eventually bring the company under the control of Anaconda Copper. In 1909 the company purchased the Raritan Copper Works, a copper refinery in New Jersey, which would eventually process most of the product produced in Tooele and Anaconda's smelter in Butte, Montana (some sources state though the Raritan–International merger didn't take place until 1934). The copper smelter in Tooele opened in 1910, with an aerial tramway having been built to bring ores in from the Bingham Canyon mining district. In 1911 the decision was made to construct a lead smelter as an addition to the Tooele site, which opened in 1912.

The 1910 Mexican Revolution caused several Arizona mines to begin shipping their ores to the Tooele Smelter since the conflict cut off access to the Cananea, Mexico, smelter. In response by 1913 work began in Miami, Arizona, to construct a new International Smelting plant. The International Smelter in Miami was designed by Louis D. Ricketts to process the local copper ore. By 1915 the new Arizona smelter began production. The smelter was designed with efficiency in mind, and proved to be one of the most successful smelters in the region. Freeport-McMoRan continues to operate a smelter at this site in the present day.

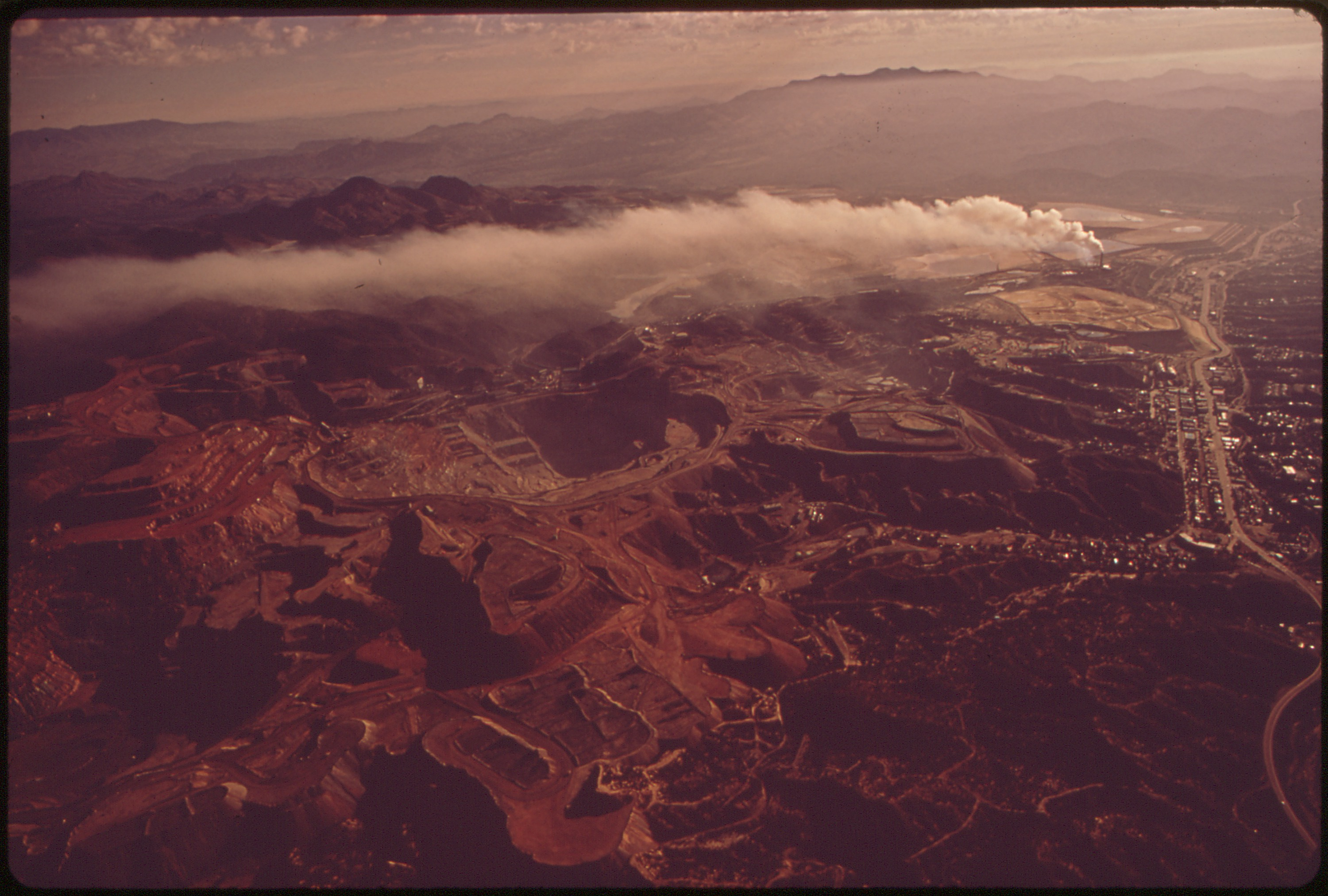
An overhead view of Miami, Arizona in 1944. Smoke from the International Smelting operation in the city can be clearly seen in the background coming from the site's smokestack

In 1914 the Anaconda Copper group bought full ownership of International Smelting Company. The assets of the International Smelting Company at the time included in addition to the Tooele operations, International Lead Refining Co. in East Chicago, Indiana, the Arizona smelter, the Raritan works, and the associated Raritan Terminal and Transportation Company. The International Smelting and Refining Company was re-founded in Montana upon the completion of the Anaconda purchase. By the 1920s the Tooele operation had become a custom smelter, processing ores from mines across the intermountain west. A large fire on May 9, 1942, destroyed the Tooele smelter's labs, machine shop, and the Tooele Valley Railway's locomotive works; all of which were rebuilt anew a short time later.

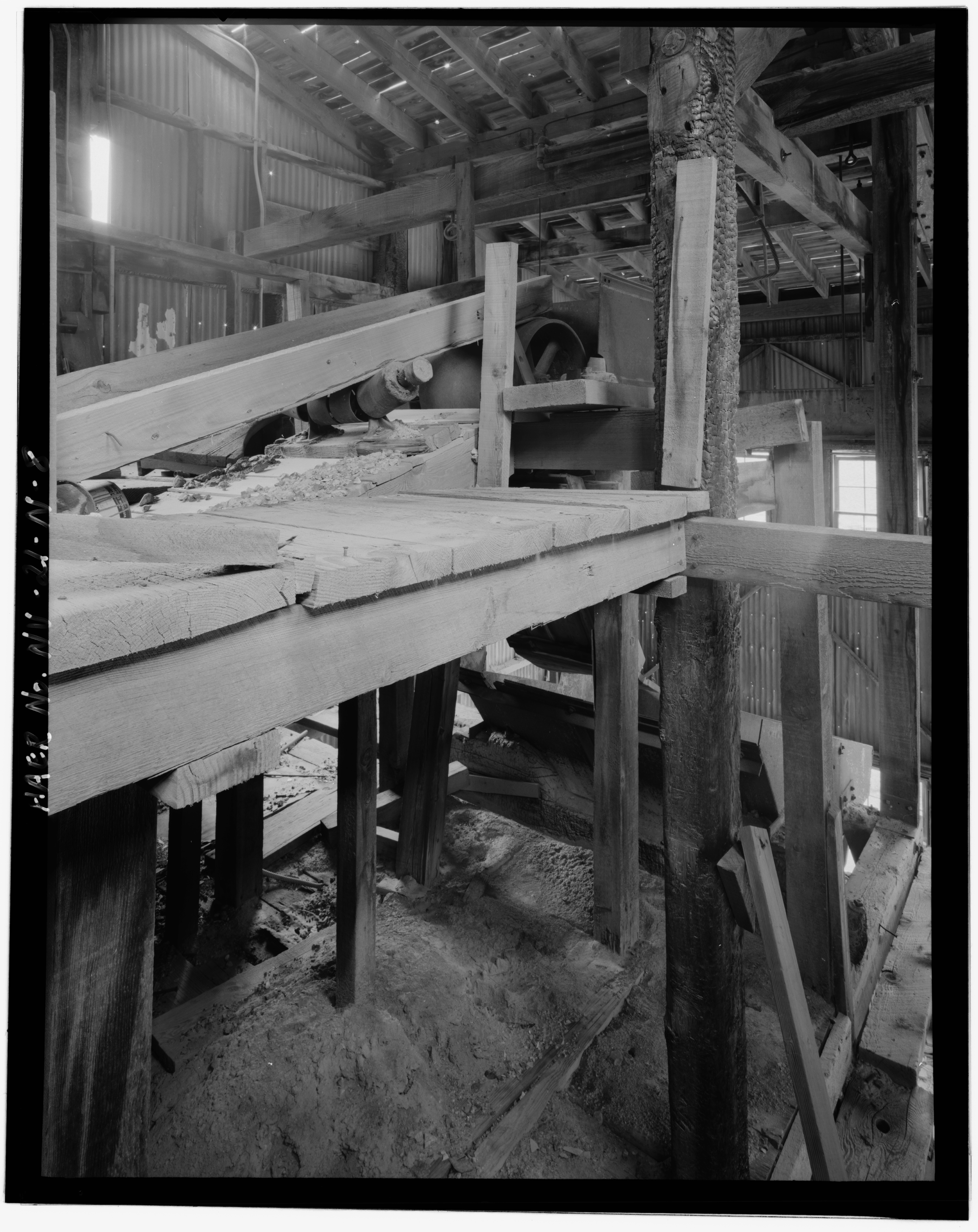
The interior of the ore crusher at the International Smelting and Refining Company site near Battle Mountain, Nevada.

By 1937 the National Tunnel and Mines Company began construction of the Elton Tunnel to replace the tramway connecting the Apex Mine and Utah Delaware Mine in Bingham Canyon with the smelter. The tunnel was named after J. O. Elton, General Manager of the International Smelter, who conducted the ground-breaking ceremony. By 1940 the National Tunnel and Mines Company was considered a subsidiary of majority owner Anaconda Copper. The tunnel was completed by 1941. Expectations were that the tunnel would provide increased production at the smelter, and many Tooele locals celebrated the new tunnel with a local "Tunnel Days" festival. An electric narrow-gauge railroad system ran through the tunnel, and interchanged with the Tooele Valley Railway at the surface portal. While demand for metal production kept the tunnel busy during World War II, the post-war environment caused a dramatic drop in demand for metals. This post-war market lead to the Elton Tunnel being shut down, the closure of the Apex and Utah Delaware mines, and the end of copper smelting operations in Tooele. The National Tunnel and Mines Company declared bankruptcy in 1948, a move which forced all the remaining assets into complete control by Anaconda.

From 1941 to 1944 the International Smelting and Refining Company leased and expanded the Copper Canyon mining camp near Battle Mountain, Nevada. The site included an ore crusher, mill, and employee housing. It appears much of the equipment used at Copper Canyon came from other International/Anaconda properties. The lease at Copper Canyon appears to have been quickly ended though by 1945. It also appears that sometime in this era the company looked into creating a busing company to transport employees to work at the Tooele smelter known as the International Bus Company, but those plans failed to come to fruition.

With the copper smelter having been shut down, the remaining operations in Tooele focused on lead and zinc recovery. The nearby U.S. Smelting in Midvale, Utah, contracted with International to smelt their milled ores in 1958. By 1960 Anaconda/International had sold off their Miami, Arizona, smelter to Inspiration Consolidated Copper. The Tooele smelter's remaining years of operation were difficult, with aging equipment and decreasing profits. When Chilean socialist president Salvador Allende nationalized Anaconda Copper's Chuquicamata mine and El Salvador mine in 1971, it forced the company to close off unprofitable mines and smelters to remain profitable. When the International Smelter finally shut down in early 1972, over 30 mines in the intermountain west were forced to close due to the lack of any other nearby smelter. The smelter, which had once hired 2000 employees during its peak, had only 350 full-time employees by the time of the closure of the Tooele operation. Meanwhile, the Raritan Copper Works were shut down in 1976.

Demolition of the Tooele smelter began shortly afterwards. The machine shops and administrative offices survived for a short while longer as part of Anaconda/ARCO's Carr Fork Mine operation until after that mine was closed and sold to Kennecott Copper. Environmental Protection Agency work in the area began in 1986 to study the site. In 1994 a buffer area around the smelter site which included both the smelter and the Elton Tunnel location was declared to be the "Carr Fork Reclamation and Wildlife Area." Long term site reclamation of the Tooele smelter began with a Utah Environmental Department Study in 1996 which detected high concentrations of lead and arsenic downhill from the smelter site. In 2000 the EPA declared the area a Superfund project and began a remediation project at the smelter site and parts of the Tooele Valley Railway route. Guidelines for land developers in the area were set in place and made available for the public via the Tooele County Health Department. The smelter site was removed from the active Superfund list in 2011.

Environmental cleanup of the East Chicago Anaconda/International lead site and the neighboring USS Lead facilities started in 2009 with the EPA declaration of the area as a Superfund site. Due to the low-income neighborhoods built in the area after the shut down of the lead facilities, clean up has been a difficult and controversial process. In 2016 the EPA began evicting residents from the West Calumet housing complex, which had been built over the former Anaconda/International site, with plans to demolish the structures there. Soil remediation is an ongoing process at the site.

== Preservation ==
A steam crane used at the Tooele smelter stored in Nevada, as seen in 2019.

Several locomotives used at the Raritan Copper Works by International have been preserved. Locomotive No. 8 is in a private collection and has been modified to have a tender. Locomotive No. 9, is preserved in the New Jersey Museum of Transportation. Locomotive No. 10 is in Boothbay, Maine. Locomotive No. 11 is preserved in South Carver, Massachusetts.

Significant artifacts from the International Smelter in Tooele were preserved in the Tooele Valley Museum to the west of the smelter site. Artifacts preserved included work tools, laboratory sampling equipment, signs used on the smelter site, and documents pertaining to the operation of the smelter and the local workers unions. The Carr Fork Reclamation and Wildlife Area has sign markers and monuments with information on the historic smelter site. As of June 2016, several pylons of the aerial tramway between the smelter and Bingham Canyon remain standing across the Oquirrh Mountains.

The only surviving structure from the Tooele smelter site is an ore conveyor bridge, which was dismantled and rebuilt into a sky bridge at the Trolley Square mall in Salt Lake City. The bridge passes over 600 South, with a small informational placard near it in the mall detailing its history. At the Nevada Southern Railroad Museum in Boulder City, Nevada, a steam crane known as "The Crab" that was used at the Tooele smelter is stored.

== See also ==
- Tooele Valley Railway
- Anaconda Copper
