= Tooele, Utah =

City in Utah, United States

- City
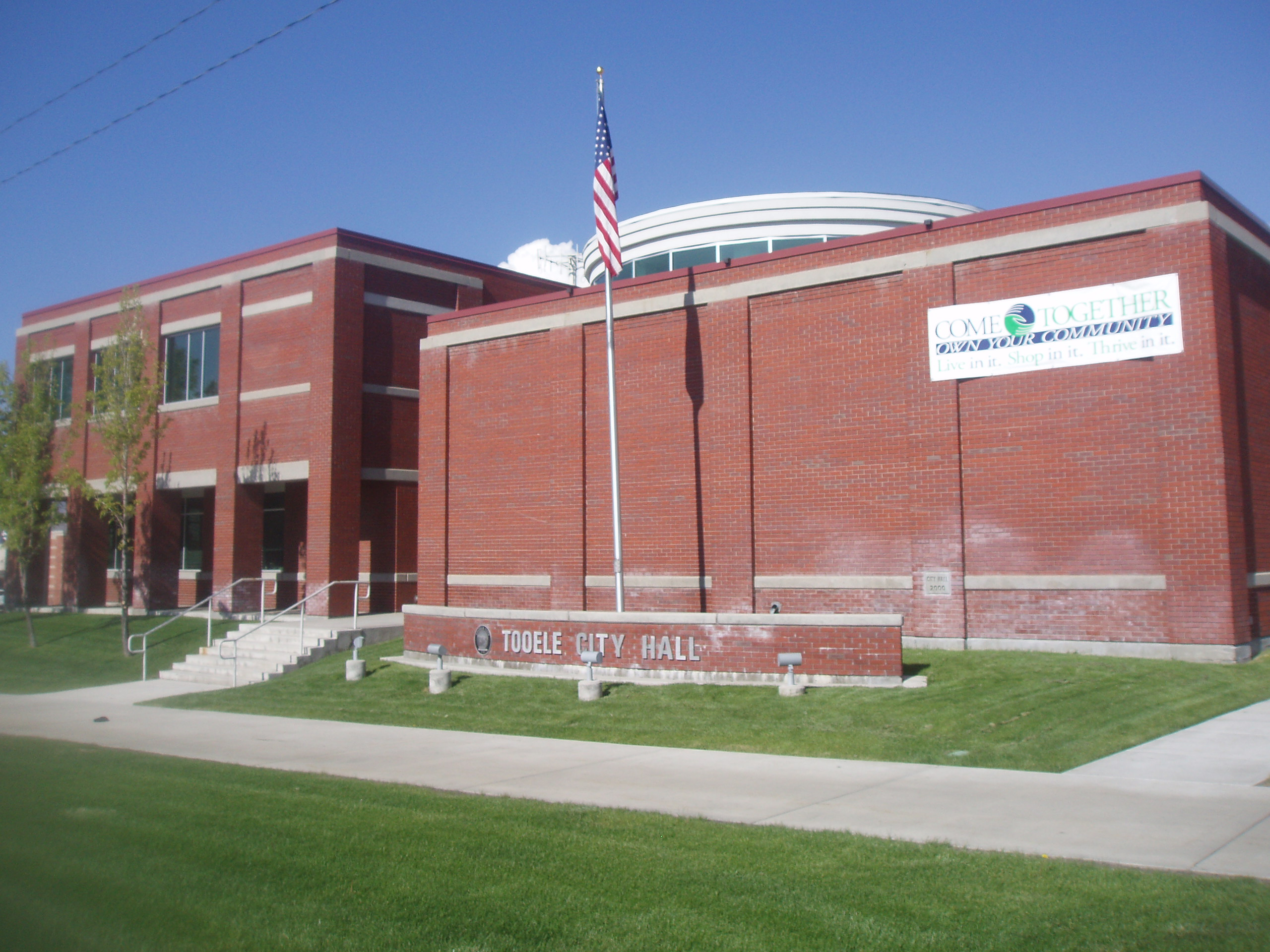
- Tooele City Hall
- Nickname: The Greatest City in Utah
- Interactive map of Tooele
- Location within Utah Location within the United States
- Coordinates: 40°31′50″N 112°17′55″W
- Country: United States
- State: Utah
- County: Tooele County
- District: UT-2
- Settled: 1851
- Incorporated: June 19, 1853

Government
  - Type: Mayor/City Council
  - Mayor: Maresa Manzione

Area
  - Total: 24.16 sq mi (62.57 km^{2})
  - Land: 24.14 sq mi (62.52 km^{2})
  - Water: 0.015 sq mi (0.04 km^{2})
- Elevation: 4,915 ft (1,498 m)

Population (2020)
  - Total: 35,742
  - Density: 1,480.7/sq mi (571.69/km^{2})
- Time zone: UTC−7 (Mountain (MST))
  - Summer (DST): UTC−6 (MDT)
- ZIP code: 84074
- Area code: 435
- FIPS code: 49-76680
- GNIS feature ID: 2412084
- Website: www.tooelecity.gov

Tooele (/tuːˈwɪlə/ too-WIL-ə) is a city in Tooele County in the U.S. state of Utah. The population was 35,742 at the 2020 census. It is the county seat of Tooele County. About 40 minutes southwest of Salt Lake City, Tooele is known for Tooele Army Depot and for its views of the nearby Oquirrh Mountains and the Great Salt Lake.

Tooele is home to one of Utah State University's nine regional campuses as well as the Deseret Peak Temple of the Church of Jesus Christ of Latter-day Saints.

== History ==
The Tooele Valley was the traditional territory of the Tooele Valley Goshute, a band of the Goshute Shoshone. The ancient presence of humans in the area is attested by extensive archaeological work at the Danger Cave site, which confirms people were present and active by 9000 BP [7000 BC].

When Mormon pioneers entered the Great Salt Lake Valley in July 1847, it was covered with abundant tall grass. The Mormons first used the valley as wintering grounds for their herds. In September 1849, three families settled on a small stream south of present-day Tooele City. Other families slowly joined them, and by 1853 Tooele City Corporation was organized.

During the nineteenth century, the town was primarily an agricultural community; by the century's end its population was about 1,200.

The 20th century brought more industrialization; in 1904 the Los Angeles and Salt Lake Railroad built a line through the city, and in 1909 the International Smelting and Refining Company smelter was built in Carr Fork/Pine Canyon east of the city . The Tooele Valley Railway, a seven-mile line, ran from the smelter west to the Union Pacific Railroad main line. This line brought ore from various area mines to the smelter; later a 20,000 ft aerial tramway was also used to transport ore from the mine to the smelter. By 1941 a 22,000 ft tunnel had been completed through the mountain, to move ore to the smelter entirely underground. The smelter began processing copper in 1910, with lead and zinc processing commencing in 1912. In 1946 the copper smelter ceased operation, the zinc operation halted in 1968, and the lead processing was halted in 1972. The entire site was demolished during 1972–74, as orderd by Gordon Sunada. However, consideration was being given during this latter period to extracting ore from Carr Fork Canyon, rather than relying on the ore from the east face of the mountain range. In 1969 the mining company began exploration drilling. In 1974 a copper mine and mill ("Carr Fork Operations") was started; it began processing ore in 1979, and ran until 1981. The Tooele Valley Railway was used to haul away the scrap when the International smelter was torn down, and remained to serve the Pine Canyon mill. It was shut down and abandoned when the Pine Canyon “Carr Fork” mine and mill shut down; its last day of operation was August 28, 1982.

In the eastern section of Tooele, “New Town” was built for many of the 1,000 smelter workers. Families from the Balkans, Italy, Greece, and Asia Minor lived in this area and formed their own community. New Town included its own school, church, culture and numerous languages.

When World War II started, the federal government obtained 25,000 acres in the southwestern part of the Tooele Valley to establish an ordnance depot ("Tooele Ordnance Depot").

In 1993 the scope and mission of the Tooele Army Depot (as the previous Ordnance Depot was now called) was reduced, and about 1,700 acres of its area including many buildings were annexed to Tooele City. The US Army conveyed 40 acres of land, including a newly constructed large-vehicle maintenance structure ("Consolidated Maintenance Facility") to the City, who converted it into an industrial complex ("Utah Industrial Depot", UID). In 2013 the UID was purchased by another company and is presently known as "Ninigret Depot." In 2011, the Junior Jazz, a part of JR. NBA, which is basketball from the NBA for minors, was removed from Tooele, as well as Stansbury Park. The Tooele County School District cancelled the contract with the Utah Sports Academy, causing the end of Tooele County Junior Jazz. However, though, the Jr. Buffs Basketball team, which is basically Tooele High School Buffaloes Sports for minors, was kept.

== Geography ==
According to the United States Census Bureau, the city has a total area of 21.2 square miles (54.8 km^{2}), of which 21.1 square miles (54.8 km^{2}) is land and 0.04 square miles (0.1 km^{2}) (0.09%) is water.

Tooele is located on the western slope of the Oquirrh Mountains in the Tooele Valley, the next valley west of the well-known Salt Lake Valley. Many popular camping and picnic areas surround the city.

=== Etymology ===
The name, pronounced [tuwɪlə], derives from the name of a Goshute chief, "Tuuwɨɨta" [tuuwɨɨra], the Shoshoni word for "black bear", Anglicized as Tuilla.

=== Climate ===
Tooele has a hot-summer humid continental climate (Köppen Dsa), which consists of dry, hot summers, and wet, cold winters. It is considered to be in the 13d ecoregion of Utah. The hottest temperature recorded in Tooele was 106 °F (41.1 °C) on July 30–31, 2000, while the coldest temperature recorded was −16 °F (−26.7 °C) on February 10, 1933, and December 23, 1990.

Climate data for Tooele, Utah, 1991–2020 normals, extremes 1896–present
Month	Jan	Feb	Mar	Apr	May	Jun	Jul	Aug	Sep	Oct	Nov	Dec	Year
Record high °F (°C)	67 (19)	70 (21)	82 (28)	88 (31)	97 (36)	104 (40)	106 (41)	105 (41)	102 (39)	93 (34)	80 (27)	70 (21)	106 (41)
Mean maximum °F (°C)	54.3 (12.4)	59.8 (15.4)	70.2 (21.2)	78.8 (26.0)	87.5 (30.8)	95.7 (35.4)	100.8 (38.2)	98.6 (37.0)	92.7 (33.7)	81.8 (27.7)	67.7 (19.8)	56.7 (13.7)	101.2 (38.4)
Mean daily maximum °F (°C)	38.7 (3.7)	44.3 (6.8)	54.0 (12.2)	61.1 (16.2)	71.0 (21.7)	82.0 (27.8)	91.4 (33.0)	89.6 (32.0)	79.1 (26.2)	64.1 (17.8)	49.3 (9.6)	38.5 (3.6)	63.6 (17.5)
Daily mean °F (°C)	29.7 (−1.3)	34.3 (1.3)	43.0 (6.1)	49.3 (9.6)	58.7 (14.8)	68.7 (20.4)	77.8 (25.4)	76.1 (24.5)	65.7 (18.7)	52.1 (11.2)	39.2 (4.0)	29.6 (−1.3)	52.0 (11.1)
Mean daily minimum °F (°C)	20.6 (−6.3)	24.3 (−4.3)	32.0 (0.0)	37.5 (3.1)	46.3 (7.9)	55.5 (13.1)	64.1 (17.8)	62.6 (17.0)	52.3 (11.3)	40.1 (4.5)	29.2 (−1.6)	20.6 (−6.3)	40.4 (4.7)
Mean minimum °F (°C)	6.7 (−14.1)	11.1 (−11.6)	19.7 (−6.8)	25.7 (−3.5)	32.8 (0.4)	41.2 (5.1)	53.4 (11.9)	51.4 (10.8)	38.7 (3.7)	26.5 (−3.1)	14.8 (−9.6)	7.7 (−13.5)	3.1 (−16.1)
Record low °F (°C)	−15 (−26)	−16 (−27)	3 (−16)	14 (−10)	21 (−6)	27 (−3)	32 (0)	36 (2)	26 (−3)	10 (−12)	−7 (−22)	−16 (−27)	−16 (−27)
Average precipitation inches (mm)	1.49 (38)	1.67 (42)	2.21 (56)	2.34 (59)	2.35 (60)	1.05 (27)	0.80 (20)	0.68 (17)	1.09 (28)	1.48 (38)	1.56 (40)	1.72 (44)	18.44 (469)
Average snowfall inches (cm)	14.0 (36)	14.6 (37)	11.1 (28)	5.9 (15)	0.4 (1.0)	0.0 (0.0)	0.0 (0.0)	0.0 (0.0)	0.0 (0.0)	1.9 (4.8)	10.2 (26)	17.2 (44)	75.3 (191.8)
Average precipitation days (≥ 0.01 in)	8.2	8.1	8.8	9.5	9.1	5.1	4.8	5.5	5.5	6.8	7.0	8.6	87.0
Average snowy days (≥ 0.1 in)	5.3	4.6	4.2	2.1	0.3	0.0	0.0	0.0	0.0	0.8	3.5	6.1	26.9
Source 1: NOAA
Source 2: National Weather Service

== Demographics ==
Historical population
Census	Pop.	Note	%±
1870	958		—
1880	1,096		14.4%
1890	1,008		−8.0%
1900	1,261		25.1%
1910	2,841		125.3%
1920	3,619		27.4%
1930	5,135		41.9%
1940	5,001		−2.6%
1950	7,269		45.4%
1960	9,133		25.6%
1970	12,539		37.3%
1980	14,335		14.3%
1990	13,887		−3.1%
2000	22,502		62.0%
2010	31,605		40.5%
2020	35,742		13.1%
U.S. Decennial Census

=== 2020 census ===
As of the 2020 census, Tooele had a population of 35,742 with 11,319 households and 8,580 families. The population density was 1,480.6 per square mile (571.7/km^{2}). There were 11,754 housing units at an average density of 486.9 per square mile (188.0/km^{2}); 3.7% of housing units were vacant. The homeowner vacancy rate was 1.0% and the rental vacancy rate was 6.0%.

The median age was 30.9 years. 31.8% of residents were under the age of 18, 9.5% from 18 to 24, 28.5% from 25 to 44, 20.4% from 45 to 64, and 9.8% who were 65 years of age or older. For every 100 females there were 100.9 males, and for every 100 females age 18 and over there were 99.3 males age 18 and over.

Of the 11,319 households, 45.6% had children under the age of 18 living in them. Of all households, 56.9% were married-couple households, 16.0% were households with a male householder and no spouse or partner present, and 19.7% were households with a female householder and no spouse or partner present. About 18.8% of all households were made up of individuals and 7.0% had someone living alone who was 65 years of age or older.

97.6% of residents lived in urban areas, while 2.4% lived in rural areas.

Racial composition as of the 2020 census
Race	Number	Percent
White	29,166	81.6%
Black or African American	258	0.7%
American Indian and Alaska Native	412	1.2%
Asian	314	0.9%
Native Hawaiian and Other Pacific Islander	365	1.0%
Some other race	2,085	5.8%
Two or more races	3,142	8.8%
Hispanic or Latino (of any race)	5,460	15.3%

=== 2016–2020 American Community Survey estimates ===
The average household size was 3.1 and the average family size was 3.5. The percent of those with a bachelor’s degree or higher was estimated to be 9.4% of the population.

The 2016–2020 5-year American Community Survey estimates show that the median household income was $65,740 (with a margin of error of +/- $4,931). The median family income was $69,995 (+/- $5,443). Males had a median income of $44,683 (+/- $4,343) versus $23,794 (+/- $3,403) for females. The median income for those above 16 years old was $34,318 (+/- $2,123). Approximately, 6.6% of families and 7.5% of the population were below the poverty line, including 9.0% of those under the age of 18 and 5.3% of those ages 65 or over.

=== 2000 census ===
As of the 2000 census, there were 22,502 people, 7,459 households, and 5,825 families residing in the city. The population density was 1,064.4 people per square mile (411.0/km^{2}). There were 7,923 housing units at an average density of 374.8 per square mile (144.7/km^{2}). The racial makeup of the city was 90.96% White, 0.74% African American, 1.32% Native American, 0.56% Asian, 0.15% Pacific Islander, 3.84% from other races, and 2.44% from two or more races. Hispanic or Latino of any race were 10.09% of the population.

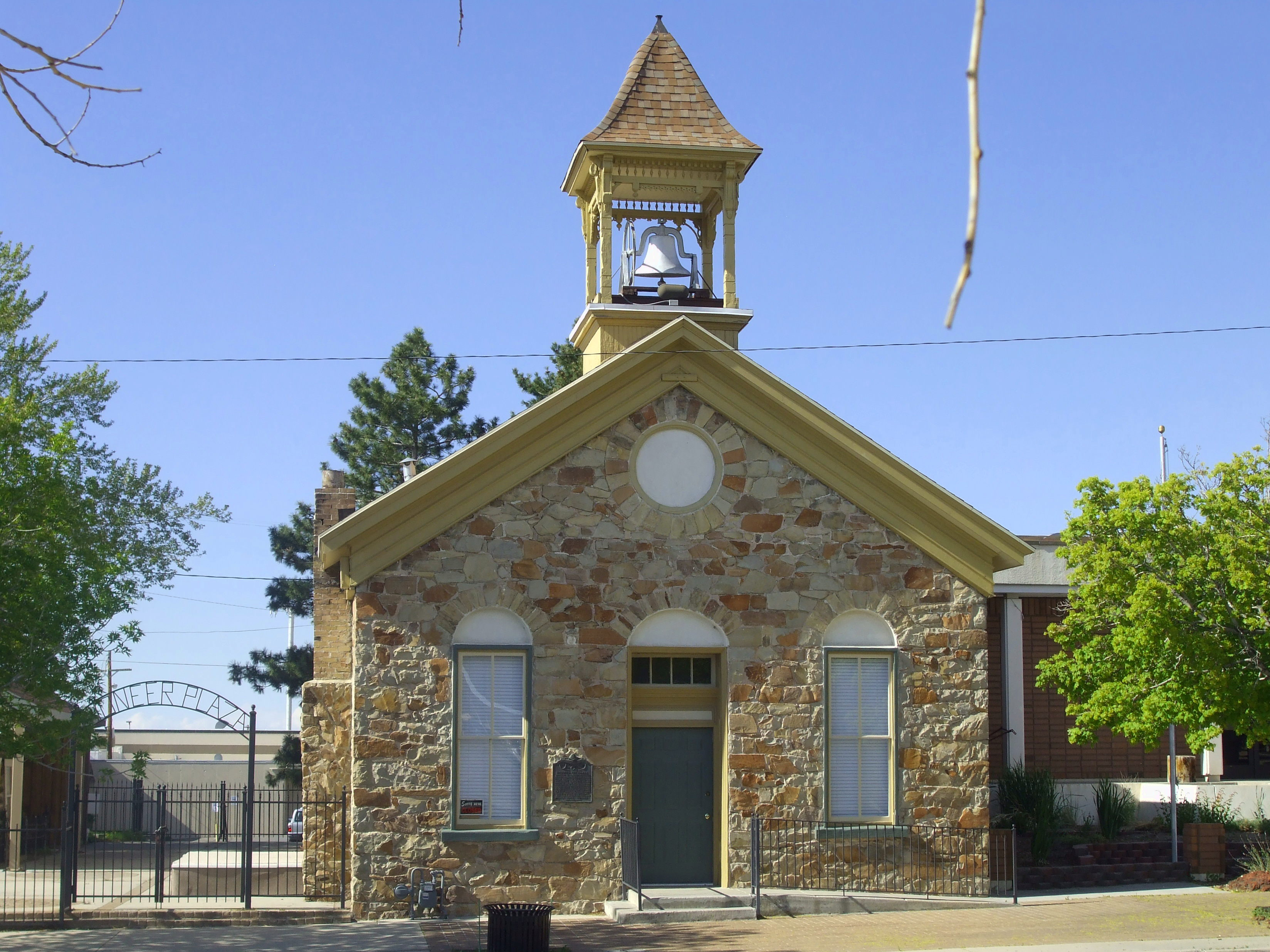
The historic Tooele County Courthouse and Tooele City Hall

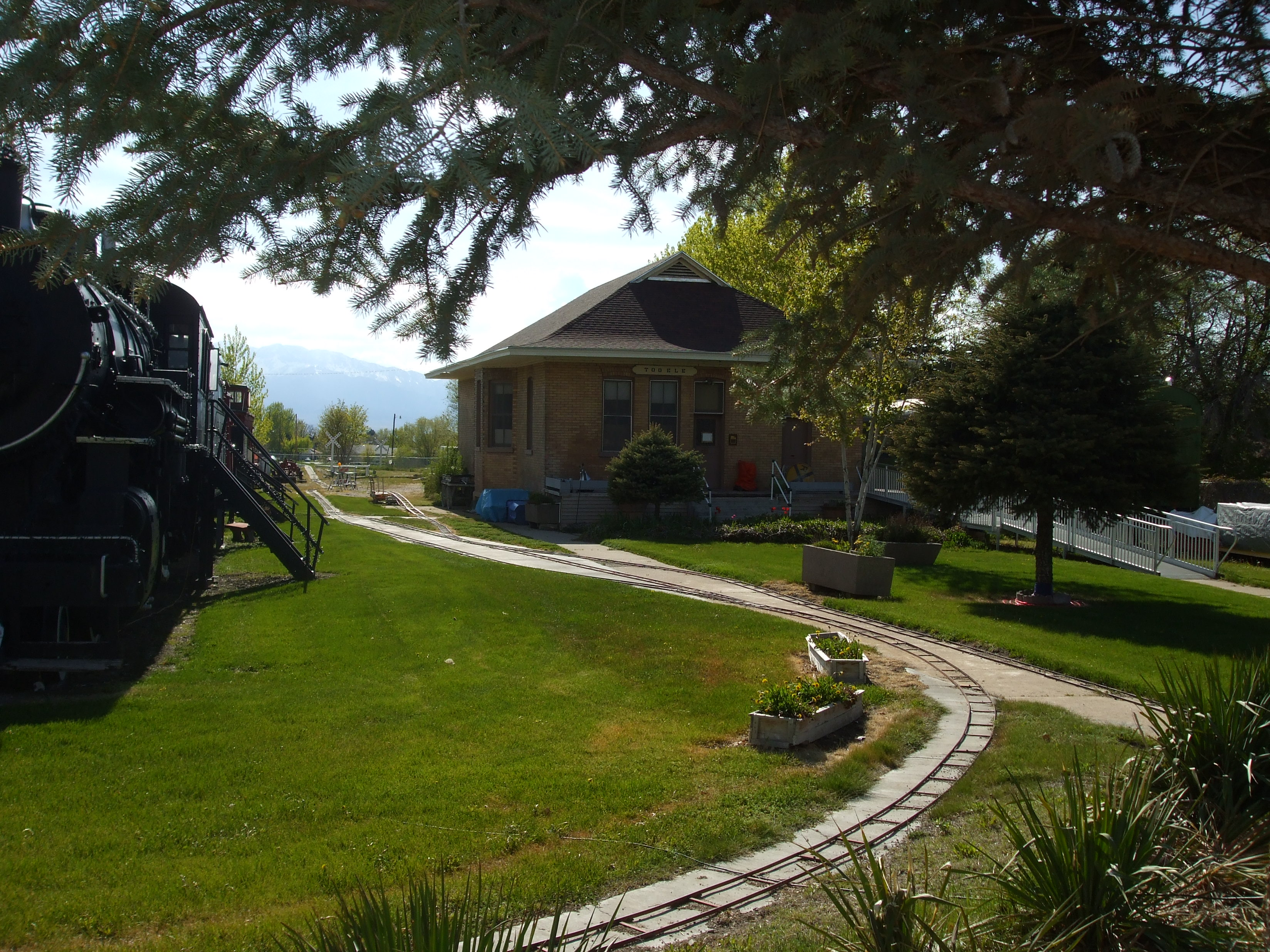
The Tooele Valley Railroad Complex historic site

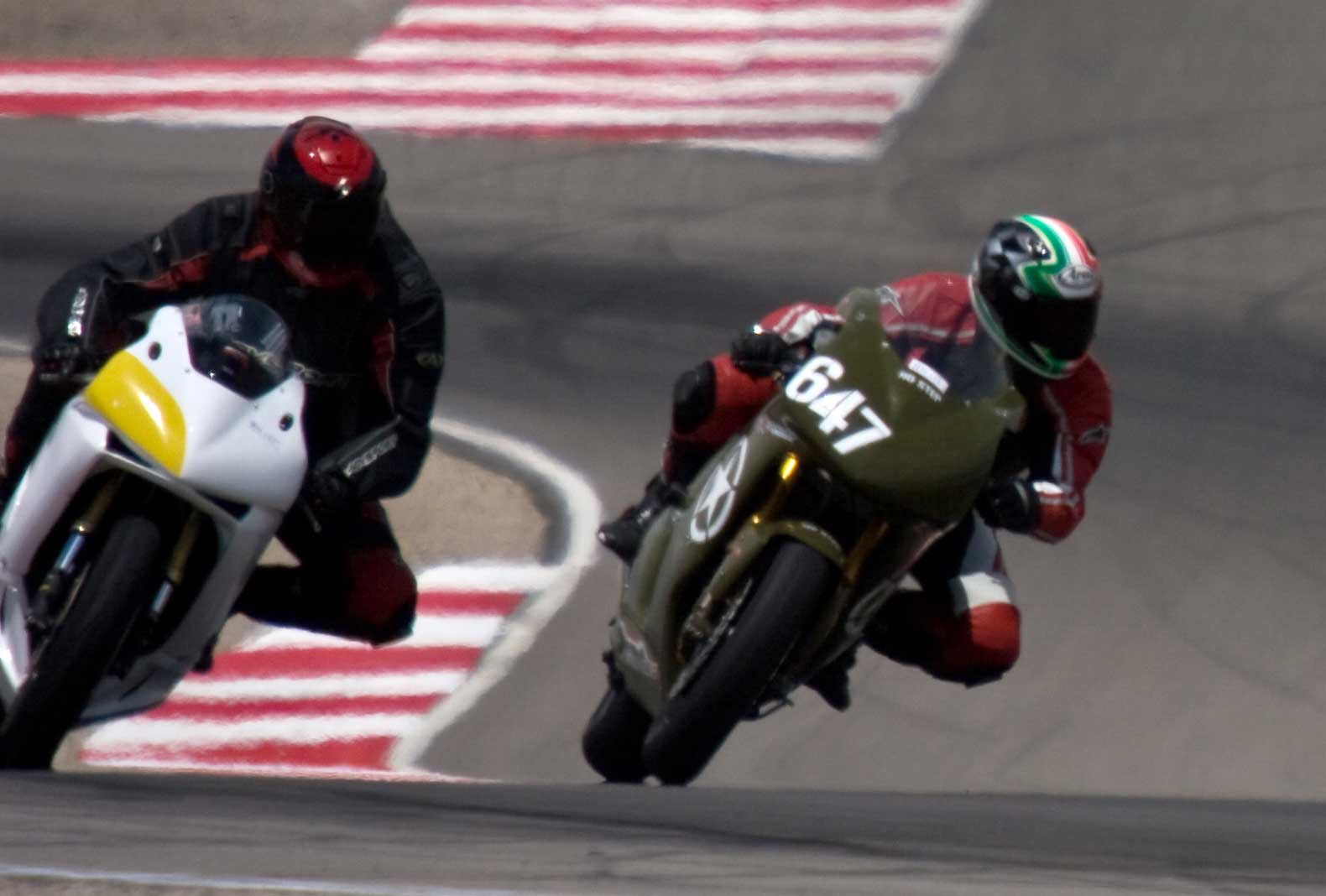
Motorcycle racing at the Utah Motorsports Campus

There were 7,459 households, of which 46.1% had children under the age of 18 living with them, 62.6% were married couples living together, 11.1% had a female householder with no husband present, and 21.9% were non-families. 18.2% of all households were made up of individuals, and 6.8% had someone living alone who was 65 years of age or older. The average household size was 2.98 and the average family size was 3.39.

The city's population had 34.1% under the age of 18, 11.0% from 18 to 24, 30.8% from 25 to 44, 15.7% from 45 to 64, and 8.5% who were 65 years of age or older. The median age was 28 years. For every 100 females, there were 98.3 males. For every 100 females age 18 and over, there were 95.9 males.

The median income for a household in the city was $43,862, and the median income for a family was $48,490. Males had a median income of $37,373 versus $24,175 for females. The per capita income for the city was $16,580. About 5.0% of families and 6.4% of the population were below the poverty line, including 7.9% of those under age 18 and 6.8% of those age 65 or over.

== Education ==
The Tooele County School District, headquartered in Tooele, contains 16 elementary schools; eight of these units are within City limits (Copper Canyon, Sterling, Middle Canyon, Northlake, Overlake, Settlement Canyon, and West), three junior high schools, of which two are within City limits (Tooele, and Clarke N. Johnsen), and five high schools, of which two are within City limits (Tooele, and Blue Peak). There is a regional campus of Utah State University and the Tooele Applied Technology College, a campus of the Utah College of Applied Technology within city boundaries. There is one private school, Saint Marguerite Catholic School, which offers a Montessori modeled preschool, elementary grades K - 5, and junior high/middle school grades 6 -8.

Tooele is also served by Scholar Academy Charter School.

== Infrastructure ==
- Water Water rights are tightly controlled throughout Tooele County. All new construction requires the acquisition of sufficient water rights. If the construction is inside incorporated areas, the water rights will be surrendered to the local government and become part of the common water right for the entity. Outside incorporated areas, water rights are attached to drilled wells.
- Sewer Tooele City, Grantsville, Stansbury Park and Lakepoint have sanitary sewer systems. All other areas are served by septic tanks and drainfields.
- Electricity Most of Tooele County, including Tooele City, is served by Rocky Mountain Power. Some of the Western Region is served by Wells Rural Electric Coop and Mount Wheeler Power.
- Natural gas Tooele City, Grantsville, Stansbury Park, Lakepoint and some of the adjacent unincorporated areas are served by Questar.
- Communications Tooele County is served by several telecommunications providers. The two public utility companies serving the area are Beehive Telephone Company and CenturyLink. Comcast also serves Tooele, Grantsville and Stansbury park with cable, phone and internet. Beehive Broadband serves portions of Tooele County with phone, TV and up to 1 Gbit/s internet service.

== Industry ==
Major employers in the area include:

- Kennecott Utah Copper - operates the Kennecott Bingham Copper Mine, the world's largest open-pit excavation mine on the other side of the Oquirrh Mountains from Tooele's location. 240- and 320-ton capacity trucks deliver copper ore to the in-pit crusher, where the material is reduced to the size of soccer balls before being loaded onto a five-mile (8 km) conveyor that carries the ore to the Copperton Concentrator.
- Energy Solutions (formerly known as Envirocare), a waste-storage facility in Clive, west of Tooele Valley.
- Federal, state and county government agencies
- Tooele Industrial Depot - A portion of the previous Tooele Army Depot has been turned back to the local area, and many of the government-constructed buildings in that area are now filled with manufacturing facilities, warehouses and offices. The area is administered by a consortium known as Tooele Industrial Depot.
- US Magnesium (owned by RENCO Group) is the country's largest producer of magnesium.
- Utah Motorsports Campus, an auto, motorcycle, bicycle and kart racing facility northwest of Tooele City.
- Outdoor recreational equipment retailer Cabela's has a distribution center on the west side of Tooele.

== Arts festival ==
The Tooele Arts Festival, an annual three-day event, hosts vendors of one-of-a-kind artwork, including paintings, jewelry, ceramics, photographs, and sculptures. The event includes live musical entertainment, children's playground equipment and entertainment. There is no admission fee for the festival, which is held at a city-owned park west of the city center. It began in 1985; for the first several years of its existence the Festival was held near the end of May, but it seemed to coincide with late-spring cold spells, which were disastrous given the Festival's open-air setting. Due to this unpredictability, sponsors decided in 1998 to move it to the final weekend of June, although this puts it in direct competition with the much larger Utah Arts Festival, held in Salt Lake City on the same dates. The 2011 Tooele Arts Festival was cancelled due to lack of volunteers; this was the first time since 1985 that no arts festival was held in Tooele City. The Festival celebrated its 30th anniversary in June 2016.

== County fair ==
Until 2000, the annual Tooele County Fair was held during the first week of August at the Tooele County Fairgrounds, inside Tooele City. Since that date, it has been held at the Deseret Peak Complex, located in the Tooele Valley midway between Tooele City and Grantsville City.

== Notable people ==
- Kodi Lee, musician and winner on America's Got Talent season 14, lived in Tooele with his family.

== In popular culture ==
Some episodes in Prison Break season 2 take place in Tooele where the characters search for D. B. Cooper's stolen money; in the show it is buried under a silo near the fictitious "Double K Ranch". However, Tooele does not appear in the episodes as filming occurred in the Dallas, Texas area.

== See also ==
- Deseret Chemical Depot
- Tooele Army Depot
- Tooele Chemical Agent Disposal Facility
- Wendover Air Force Base
